= Buras (disambiguation) =

Burås is a village in Akershus, Norway

Buras may also refer to:

- Buras (surname)
- Buras, Louisiana
- Buras-Triumph, Louisiana
