= Hellvik, Akershus =

- Village
- Interactive map of Hellvik, Akershus
- Country: Norway
- Region: Østlandet
- County: Akershus
- District: Follo
- Municipality: Nesodden
- Time zone: UTC+01:00 (CET)
  - Summer (DST): UTC+02:00 (CEST)

Hellvik is a village in the municipality of Nesodden, Norway. It is situated on the eastern coast of Nesodden facing the Bunnefjorden. Hellvik lies north of Berger, east of Skoklefall and south of Ursvik. As Nesodden is a peninsula, the estimated time by car, heading into Oslo, is about 50 minutes.

Hellviktangen, a bit north of Hellvikstrand, is an old farm, turned into a café, surrounded by green fields and beaches - the café and the area surrounding it are considered to be one of the "pearls" of Eastern Norway. The village is connected by Hellvikskogveien, Hellvikveien and Hellvikstrand.

Geographically, Hellvik is quite steep, making construction planning an architectural challenge. Up to now, Hellvik has remained relatively untouched by urbanisation. Since the early 1990s however, Hellvik has seen the construction of several "modernistic" buildings built.
