= Torget =

Torget may refer to:

- Torget, Hurdal, a village in Hurdal Municipality in Akershus county, Norway
- Torget, Nesodden, a village in Nesodden Municipality in Akershus county, Norway
- Torget, Nordland, an island in Brønnøy Municipality in Nordland county, Norway
- Torget, Oppland, a village in Nord-Aurdal Municipality in Innlandet county, Norway
- MS Torget (1963), a ferry in service with Torghatten
