= Hemnes, Akershus =

Coordinates: 59°43′N 11°28′E

- Village
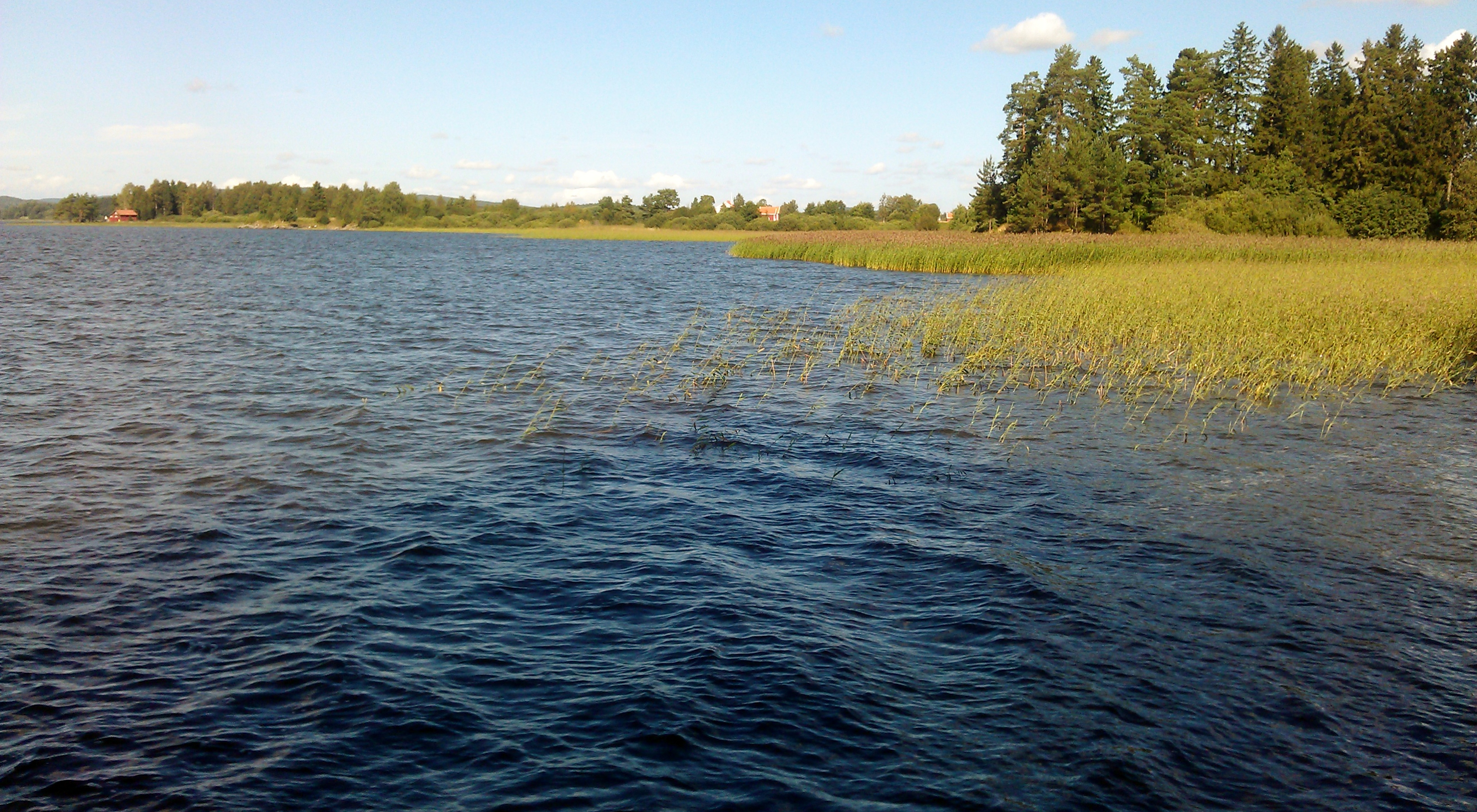
- Interactive map of Hemnes, Akershus
- Country: Norway
- Region: Østlandet
- County: Akershus
- District: Romerike
- Municipality: Aurskog-Høland
- Time zone: UTC+01:00 (CET)
  - Summer (DST): UTC+02:00 (CEST)

Hemnes is a village in the municipality of Aurskog-Høland, Norway. Its population (2005) is 613. In Hemnes there is a school, Bråte Skole, which covers Løken, Momoen and Hemnes. Hemnes is located just east of Hemnes island (Hemnesøya) close to the North-East corner of the Hemnes lake (Hemnessjøen/Øgderen).
