= Olav Traaen =

Norwegian sports commentator (born 1972)

Olav Traaen (born 22 February 1972) is a Norwegian sports commentator.

He grew up at Rykkinn, and was active in the sports club Bærums Verk IF. In 1986, he was the youngest referee at the Norway Cup.

He was recruited from local radio to NRK Østlandssendingen. He was then picked to comment the 1998 FIFA World Cup for NRK television, and continued as a versatile sports commentator. By 2010, when he commented luge, skeleton and bobsleigh at the 2010 Winter Olympics, he had commented fourteen different sports. He has cited his best sports memory to be the 1994 Winter Olympics, and his best commenting memory to be the 2000 Olympic women's football final, where Norway won the Olympic gold.

He resides at Marienlyst.
