= Flag of Akershus =

Norwegian county flag

Akershus Flag

The flag of Akershus represents Akershus county, Norway. Designed by Finn Fagerli, it was approved by Royal Resolution on 11 December 1987. The flag is a banner of the Coat of arms of Akershus which is a silver step-gable on a blue field. It is rare among Norwegian flags in being square. The design is a reference to Akershus Castle where several of the buildings feature such gables. The castle was the seat of the governor of Akershus Amt, the predecessor of today's county.
