= Åsgreina =

- Village
- Location in Akershus
- Coordinates: 60°10′19″N 10°59′4″E
- Country: Norway
- Region: Østlandet
- County: Akershus
- Municipality: Nannestad
- Time zone: UTC+01:00 (CET)
  - Summer (DST): UTC+02:00 (CEST)

Åsgreina or Åsgrenda is a village in Nannestad municipality, Norway. Its population as of 2005 was 603, including that of the nearby village of Slattumhagen.
