= Svestad =

Coordinates: 59°46′31″N 10°35′40″E

- Village
- Interactive map of Svestad
- Country: Norway
- Region: Østlandet
- County: Akershus
- District: Follo
- Municipality: Nesodden
- Time zone: UTC+01:00 (CET)
  - Summer (DST): UTC+02:00 (CEST)

Svestad is a village and a former oil and gas harbour in Akershus, Norway. Svestad is situated at the Oslofjorden side of the peninsula and municipality of Nesodden just south of Oslo.
