= Skrukkelia =

- Village
- Location in Akershus Skrukkelia (Norway)
- Coordinates: 60.4483°N 10.8339°E
- Country: Norway
- Region: Østlandet
- County: Akershus
- Municipality: Hurdal
- Time zone: UTC+01:00 (CET)
  - Summer (DST): UTC+02:00 (CEST)

Skrukkelia is a village in Hurdal, Akershus, Norway.
