= Langset =

- Village
- Location in Akershus
- Coordinates: 60.4047°N 11.2431°E
- Country: Norway
- Region: Østlandet
- County: Akershus
- Municipality: Eidsvoll
- Time zone: UTC+01:00 (CET)
  - Summer (DST): UTC+02:00 (CEST)

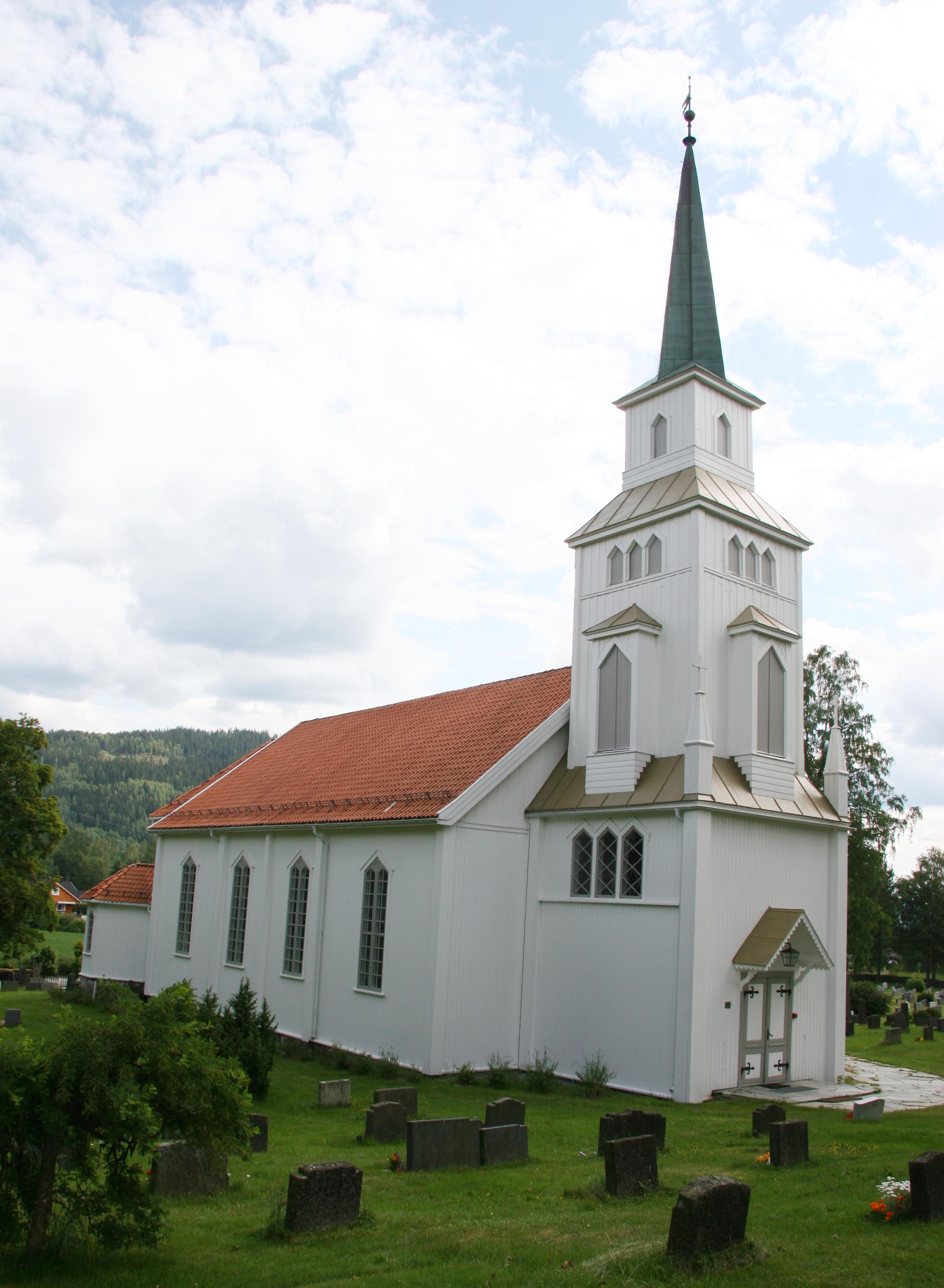
The Langset Church

Langset is a village in the municipality of Eidsvoll, Norway. It is located a few kilometres east of Minnesund, near the southern end of lake Mjøsa. Its population (2005) is 309.
