= Flaskebekk =

- Village
- Location in Akershus
- Coordinates: 59°51′N 10°39′E
- Country: Norway
- Region: Østlandet
- County: Akershus
- Municipality: Nesodden
- Time zone: UTC+01:00 (CET)
  - Summer (DST): UTC+02:00 (CEST)

Flaskebekk is a village in Nesodden municipality and Akershus county, Norway. The village is located on the northwestern end of Nesoddtangen peninsula, south of Oslo. It looks onto the Oslofjord and Oslo, Bærum, and Asker in the distance. The area borders Tangen to the North; Bjørnemyr to the South; and Skoklefall to the East.

Flaskebekk is known for 'Strandpromenaden' - the beach promenade - which hugs the coastline south of Nordre Flaskebekk pier. Along the promenade are badehus - small 'bath houses' usually owned by local families and simply furnished for day trips to the fjord. A ferry on the Oslo - Drøbak route stops at Nordre Flaskebekk pier during the summer months.

Flaskebekk played a role in the Norwegian resistance movement during World War II. Corncrake, a clandestine radio station belonging to resistance organization Milorg, was located in a summer house in Flaskebekk. German soldiers ambushed the location on April 4, 1944; Leif Kyrre Karlsen, Ivar William Wagle, and Tell Christian Wagle, the station's three undercover agents, lost their lives in the ambush. A small plaque has been erected at Flaskebekkveien to commemorate the radio station.

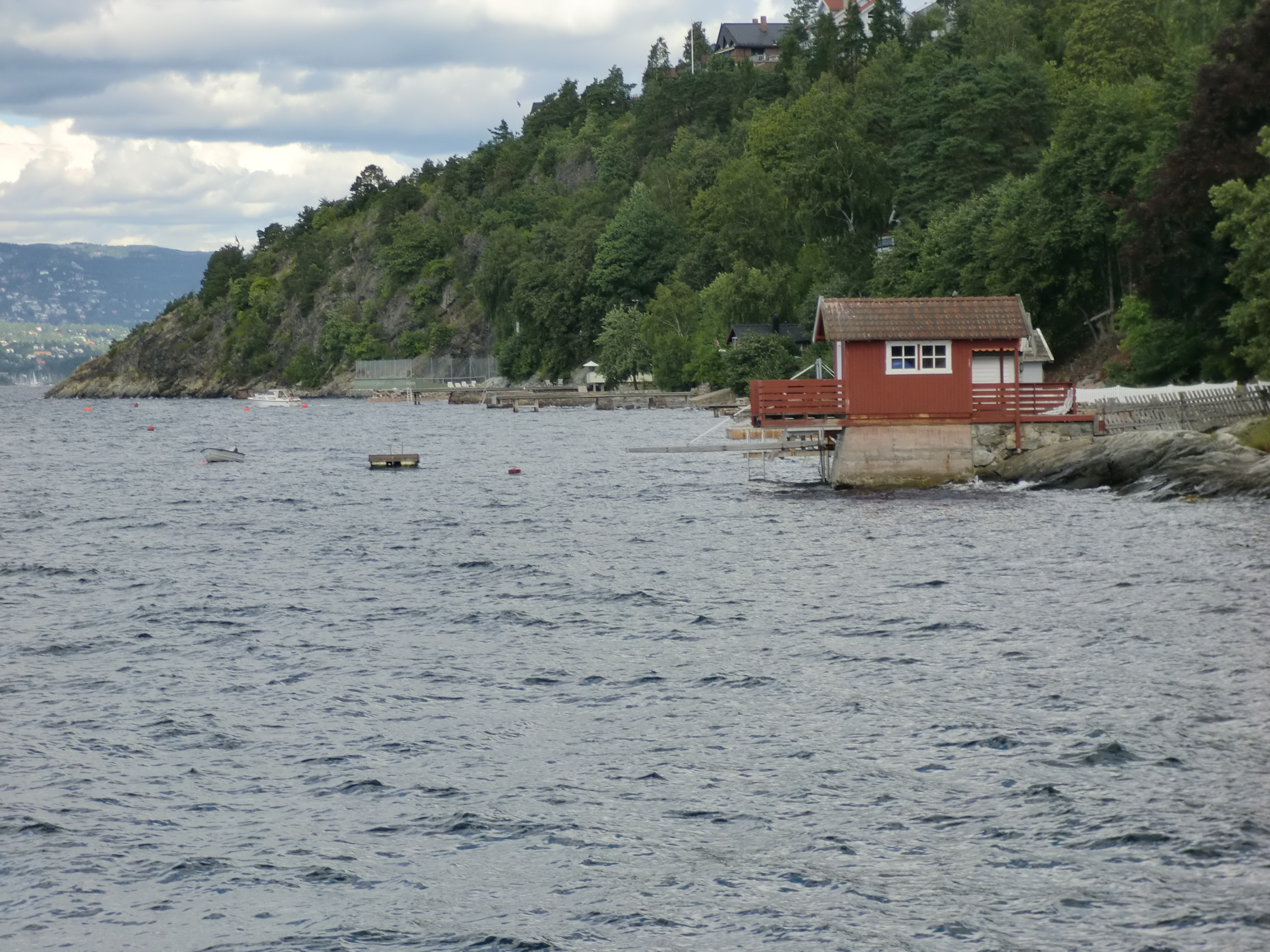
Flaskebekk coastline, looking north from Nordre Flaskebekk pier.
