= Akershus =

County in Eastern Norway

Coordinates: 60°00′N 11°00′E

- County
- Akershus fylke
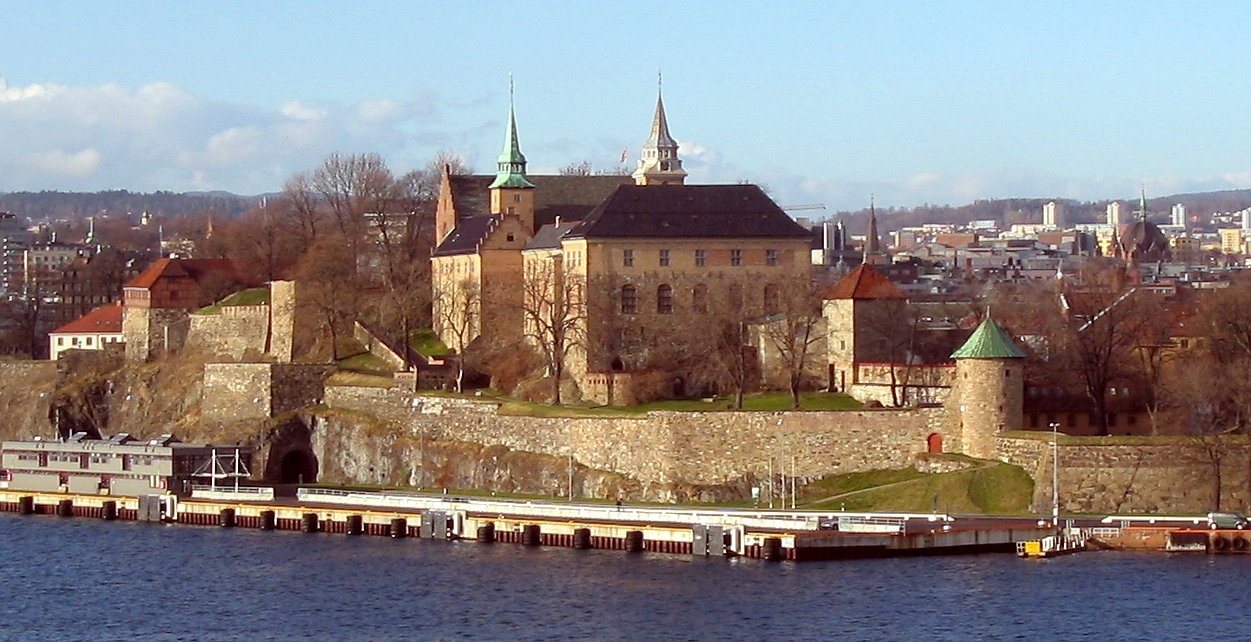
- Akershus Fortress, in modern Oslo, was the namesake and center of the region of Akershus since the Middle Ages, and was located within Akershus main county until 1919.

- Flag Coat of arms

- Akershus within Norway
- Country: Norway
- Region: Østlandet
- County ID: NO-32
- Administrative centre: Oslo

Government
  - Governor: Ingvild Aleksandersen (Acting)
  - County mayor: Thomas Sjøvold, Høyre (2023-)

Area
  - Total: 4,918 km^{2} (1,899 sq mi)
  - Land: 4,579 km^{2} (1,768 sq mi)
  - Rank: 16th in Norway, 1.50% of Norway's land area

Population (As of January 1, 2025, the population of Akershus county in Norway is estimated at 740,680 residents. This makes Akershus the largest county in Norway by population)
  - Total: 630,752 ▲
  - Rank: 2 (10.67% of country)
  - Density: 134/km^{2} (350/sq mi)
  - Change (10 years): 13.7 %

GDP
  - Total: NOK 285.853 billion (€31.987 billion)
  - Per capita: NOK 476,986 (€53,375)
- Time zone: UTC+01 (CET)
  - Summer (DST): UTC+02 (CEST)
- Official language form: Bokmål
- Website: afk.no

Akershus (Norwegian pronunciation: [ɑkəʂˈhʉːs]) is a county in Norway, with Oslo as its administrative centre, though Oslo is not located within Akershus. Akershus has been a region in Eastern Norway with Oslo as its main city since the Middle Ages, and is named after the Akershus Fortress in Oslo and ultimately after the medieval farm Aker in Oslo. From the Middle Ages to 1919, Akershus was a main fief and main county that included most of Eastern Norway, and from the 17th century until 2020 and again from 2024, Akershus also has a narrower meaning as a smaller central county in the Greater Oslo Region. Akershus is Norway's largest county by population with over 716,000 inhabitants.

Originally Akershus was one of four main fiefs in Norway and included almost all of Eastern Norway. The original Akershus became a main county (Stiftamt or Stift) in 1662 and was sometimes also known as Christiania Stift. It included several subcounties (Amt or Underamt); in 1682 its most central areas, consisting of modern Oslo and Akershus, became the subcounty of Akershus within the larger main county of the same name. In 1842, the capital city of Christiania, which at the time consisted of a tiny part of modern Oslo, became a separate subcounty within Akershus main county. The main county of Akershus was disestablished in 1919, and the subcounty continued as Akershus county (fylke). During its history Akershus (sub) county ceded territory to Oslo several times; Akershus' most central and important municipality, Aker, was transferred to Oslo in 1948. Thus, while modern Akershus' capital is Oslo, Oslo is not located within the modern county itself. In 2020, the county of Akershus was merged into Viken along with the counties of Østfold and Buskerud, but Akershus was reestablished as a county from 2024 with slightly enlarged borders. Modern Akershus borders Oslo, Hedmark, Oppland, Buskerud, and Østfold; it also has a short border with Sweden (Värmland).

Historical population
Year	Pop.	±%
1951	183,116	—
1961	234,323	+28.0%
1971	324,390	+38.4%
1981	369,193	+13.8%
1991	418,114	+13.3%
2001	471,988	+12.9%
2011	545,653	+15.6%
2018	614,026	+12.5%
Source: Statistics Norway.

Religion in Akershus
religion	percent
Christianity	81.48%
Islam	1.93%
Buddhism	0.35%
Other	16.24%

== Geography ==
As a geographical term the meaning of Akershus has changed over time. Akershus originally primarily referred to Akershus main county, which included most of Eastern Norway, with the exception of Upper Telemark and Båhuslen (now mainly part of Sweden). The modern Akershus county is a direct continuation of the subcounty of Akershus, created in 1682, and included all of modern Oslo and Akershus. In 1842 the capital city of Christiania, which at the time consisted of a tiny part of modern Oslo, became a separate subcounty within Akershus main county. Akershus main county ceased to exist in 1919, after which Akershus in everyday usage became synonymous with the modern county that excluded Christiania. Akershus' most central and important municipality, Aker, was transferred to Oslo in 1948.

Since 1948, the rump Akershus county is conventionally divided into Asker and Bærum, which are municipalities located west of Oslo, enclaved from the rest of the county; and Follo and Romerike, regions situated east of Oslo, which constitute the bulk of the county's area and population.

Embracing numerous suburbs and urban areas of Oslo, notably Bærum and historically Aker, Akershus is one of the most densely populated areas in the country. The main national railway lines into Oslo run through Akershus with many junctions and stations such as Asker, Sandvika, Ski, and Lillestrøm. Akershus includes some of the lake Mjøsa and some of the river Glomma.

The county also includes the historical place Eidsvoll, 48 km north of Oslo, in which the national assembly ratified the Norwegian constitution in 1814. South of Eidsvoll is the international airport, Oslo Airport at Gardermoen. Oslo's previous international airport, Fornebu, is also located in Akershus. The estate of the crown prince is located in Asker (whereas Oslo boasts the royal palace).

== Infrastructure ==
The county has two major hospitals, Akershus University Hospital and Sykehuset Asker og Bærum.

The main road from continental Europe, E6, enters Akershus in the south, and runs through eastern Oslo, further to Gardermoen, and into Hedmark County on the eastern shores of lake Mjøsa.

E18 enters Akershus in the south-east, merges for a short stretch with E6 at Vinterbro in Ås, before running under central Oslo. E18 then turns south-west through Bærum and Asker before entering Buskerud County north of Drammen.

E16 runs from the intersection with E18 in Sandvika into Buskerud County west of Sollihøgda.

All main railways out of Oslo run through Akershus:

- Southwest: the Drammen Line
- Southeast: the Østfold Line as two separate railways
- North: the Gjøvik Line
- Northeast: the Trunk Line, Gardermoen Line, and Dovre Line
- East: the Kongsvinger Line

== History ==
Akershus became a fief in the 16th century, and then also included the current counties of Hedmark, Oppland, Buskerud, and Oslo, as well as the municipalities of Askim, Eidsberg, and Trøgstad in the county of Østfold. In 1662, Akershus became an Amt, and in 1685, Buskerud was separated from Akershus and became an Amt of its own. In 1768, Hedmark and Oppland were also separated from Akershus to become Oplandenes Amt (and Askim, Eidsberg, and Trøgstad were transferred to Østfold). In 1842, the city of Christiania (Oslo) was made a separate Amt, as well. In 1919, the term Amt was changed to Fylke. In 1948, Aker, the greatest and the most populous municipality of Akershus, was transferred to the county of Oslo.

== Name ==
The county is named after Akershus Fortress. The fortress was built in 1299, and the meaning of the name is "the (fortified) house of (the district) Aker". The name is somewhat misleading now, since the fortress is now outside Akershus (it has been in Oslo County since 1842). In fact, the administration of Akershus sits outside the county, as well, in the centre of Oslo.

== Coat of arms ==
The coat of arms is from modern times (1987). It shows a gable from Akershus Fortress.

== Municipalities ==
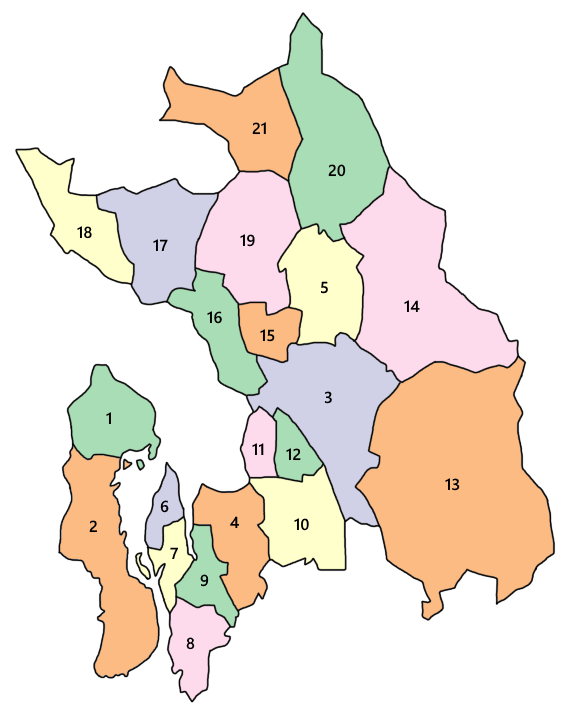
Municipalities of Akershus

Akershus has a total of 21 municipalities:

1. Bærum
2. Asker
3. Lillestrøm
4. Nordre Follo
5. Ullensaker
6. Nesodden
7. Frogn
8. Vestby
9. Ås
10. Enebakk
11. Lørenskog
12. Rælingen
13. Aurskog-Høland
14. Nes
15. Gjerdrum
16. Nittedal
17. Lunner
18. Jevnaker
19. Nannestad
20. Eidsvoll
21. Hurdal

Number of minorities (1st and 2nd gen.) in Akershus by country of origin in 2017
Nationality	Population (2017)
Poland	15,685
Pakistan	7,351
Sweden	7,050
Lithuania	5,090
Iran	4,472
Vietnam	4,252
Iraq	4,127
Denmark	3,643
Philippines	3,461
Sri Lanka	3,290
Germany	3,265
Afghanistan	3,053
Somalia	2,939
Russia	2,839
India	2,765
UK	2,381
Eritrea	2,310
Kosovo	2,233
Thailand	2,066
Turkey	1,812
Bosnia-Herzegovina	1,786
Romania	1,725
China	1,547
Syria	1,537
USA	1,320

== Districts ==
- Asker og Bærum (Norwegian)
- Follo
- Fornebu
- Gjelleråsen
- Greater Oslo Region
- Haslum
- Heggedal
- Hosle
- Jar, Norway
- Kolbotn
- Nedre Romerike
- Øvre Romerike
- Romerike
- Skui
- Slependen
- Snarøya

== Cities ==
- Drøbak
- Jessheim
- Lillestrøm
- Sandvika
- Ski

== Parishes ==
- Asker
- Aurskog
- Bjørke
- Blaker
- Bærum
- Drøbak
- Eidsvoll
- Enebakk
- Feiring
- Fenstad
- Fet
- Frogn
- Frogner
- Garder
- Gjerdrum
- Hakadal
- Hemnes
- Heni
- Holter
- Hovin
- Hurdal
- Hvitsten
- Høland
- Høvik
- Kroer
- Kråkstad
- Langset
- Lillestrøm
- Løken, see Høland
- Lørenskog
- Maria kirke
- Nannestad
- Nes
- Nesodden
- Nittedal
- Nordby
- Oppegård
- Rælingen
- Setskog (Sitskogen)
- Skedsmo
- Ski
- Stensgård
- Søndre Høland
- Sørum
- Såner
- Udenes
- Ullensaker
- Vestby
- Vestre Bærum
- Østre Bærum
- Ås

== Villages ==
- Algarheim
- Alværn
- Ask
- Askkroken
- Aulifeltet
- Aursmoen
- Bekkeberga
- Bekkestua
- Berger
- Billingstad
- Bjerkås
- Bjørkelangen
- Bjørnemyr
- Blaker
- Blakstad
- Blommenholm
- Blylaget
- Blystadlia
- Bodung
- Bomannsvik
- Borgen, Asker
- Borgen, Ullensaker
- Brevik
- Bråtesletta
- Brudalen
- Brårud
- Burås
- Bærums Verk
- Bærumsmarka
- Bøn
- Dal
- Dalsroa
- Danskerud
- Dikemark
- Drengsrud
- Drøbak
- Dønski
- Eidsvoll Verk
- Eiksmarka
- Eltonåsen
- Enebakkneset
- Fagerstrand
- Feiring
- Fenstad
- Finnbråten
- Finstadbru
- Finstadjordet
- Fjellfoten
- Fjellhamar
- Fjellsrud
- Fjellstad
- Fjellstrand
- Fjerdingby
- Flaskebekk
- Flateby
- Fosser
- Frogner
- Gan
- Garder
- Gardermoen
- Grav
- Greverud
- Grinitajet
- Grønlundfjellet
- Grønvoll
- Gullhella
- Gullverket
- Haga
- Hakadal
- Hammerstad
- Hauerseter
- Hanaborg
- Heer
- Hellerud
- Hellvik, Akershus
- Hemnes
- Hogsetfeltet
- Hurdal
- Hurdal Verk
- Hvam
- Hvitsten
- Hølen
- Høvik
- Håkavik
- Ingeborgrud
- Jessheim
- Jong
- Kampå
- Kirkebygda
- Kirkerud
- Kjeller
- Kjenn
- Kjul
- Kjøvangen
- Kjøya
- Kløfta
- Kolbotn
- Konglungen
- Kringler
- Kråkstad
- Kurland
- Langhus
- Langset
- Leirsund
- Lierfoss
- Lindeberg
- Lommedalen
- Lundermoen
- Lysaker
- Løkeberg
- Løken
- Løkenfeltet
- Lørenfallet
- Løstad
- Løvenstad
- Maura
- Minnesund
- Mogreina
- Momoen
- Nerdrum
- Nesbru
- Neskollen
- Nesoddtangen
- Nesset
- Nesøya
- Nordbyhagen
- Nordkisa
- Oksval
- Onsrud
- Oppegård
- Oppåkermoen
- Pepperstad skog
- Rasta
- Rotnes
- Rud
- Rustadbruk
- Rustadmoen
- Rykkinn
- Rælingen
- Røykås
- Råholt
- Rånåsfoss
- Sand
- Sem
- Sessvollmoen
- Seterstøa
- Setskog
- Siggerud
- Sjøstrand
- Skaugum
- Skedsmokorset
- Skiphelle
- Skjetten
- Skotbu
- Skrukkelia
- Skulerud
- Skytta
- Skårer
- Slattum
- Slattumhagen
- Smestad
- Sofiemyr
- Solberg
- Solemskogen
- Son
- Store Brevik
- Strømmen
- Styrigrenda
- Sundbyhagen
- Svarterud
- Svartskog
- Svestad
- Sværsvann
- Sørumsand
- Såner
- Tanum
- Teigebyen
- Togrenda
- Torget, Hurdal
- Torget, Nesodden
- Trandum
- Trollåsen
- Tårnåsen
- Ursvik
- Vardeåsen
- Vestby
- Vettre
- Vevelstad
- Vinterbro
- Visperud
- Voll
- Vollen
- Vormsund
- Vøyenenga
- Ytre Enebakk
- Østerås
- Åkrene
- Åneby
- Årnes
- Ås
- Åsgreina
- Åsgrenda
- Sundet

== Former municipalities ==
- Aker
- Aurskog
- Blaker
- Drøbak
- Feiring
- Hvitsten
- Høland
- Hølen
- Kråkstad
- Lillestrøm
- Nordre Høland
- Setskog
- Son
- Søndre Høland

== Notable residents ==
People from Akershus

- Kristoffer Ajer (1998–), football player (Celtic FC), national team
- Harriet Backer (1845–1932), artist, painter educated in Oslo, Berlin, Munich and Paris
- Jo Benkow (1924–2013), WWII pilot and politician, president of Stortinget 1985-1993
- John Carew (1979–), former football player (Lørenskog, Vålerenga, Valencia, Lyon, Aston Villa), with 24 goals for Norway.
- Bjørn Dæhlie (1967), cross-country skier and most-winning skier globally, with eight gold medals from Winter Olympics
- Kai Eide, diplomat, writer and politician; special UN envoy to Kosovo in 2005, head of UN mission to Afghanistan from 2008 to 2010
- Euronymous (1968–1993), musician and co-founder of black metal band Mayhem
- Åslaug Haga (1959–), politician, member of parliament and government, president of Global Crop Diversity Trust from 2013 to 2020
- Morten Harket (1959–), musician and singer, vocal of pop group A-ha
- Trygve Haavelmo (1911–1999), economist and Nobel Prize laureate
- Anniken Huitfeldt, politician, chair of Stortinget Committee on Foreign Relations and Defence
- Carl Otto Løvenskiold (1839–1916), politician, and briefly prime minister in Stockholm in 1884
- Rolf Presthus (1936–1988), politician, former chairman of Conservative Party and minister of Finance
- Jan Tore Sanner (1966–), politician, minister of Finance in Norway since 2020
- Reiulf Steen (1933–2014), politician, chairman of the Norwegian Labour Party from 1965 to 1975
- Johan Herman Wessel (1742–1785), poet and early satiric author
