= Vettre, Norway =

- Village
- Location in Akershus
- Coordinates: 59°49′28″N 10°28′26″E
- Country: Norway
- Region: Østlandet
- County: Akershus
- Time zone: UTC+01:00 (CET)
  - Summer (DST): UTC+02:00 (CEST)

Vettre is a coastal village situated on the shores of the Oslo Fjord. It is proximal to Asker Sentrum and not far from Heggedal and also Borgen.
