= Bomannsvik =

- Village
- Location in Akershus Bomannsvik (Norway)
- Coordinates: 59°47′29″N 10°42′19″E
- Country: Norway
- Region: Østlandet
- County: Akershus
- District: Follo
- Municipality: Nesodden
- Time zone: UTC+01:00 (CET)
  - Summer (DST): UTC+02:00 (CEST)

Bomannsvik is a village in Akershus, Norway, situated at the shore of Bunnefjorden in the municipality of Nesodden. The village is most well known for being very similar to a village from the 2011 video game Minecraft.
