= Feiring, Norway =

Feiring
- Village
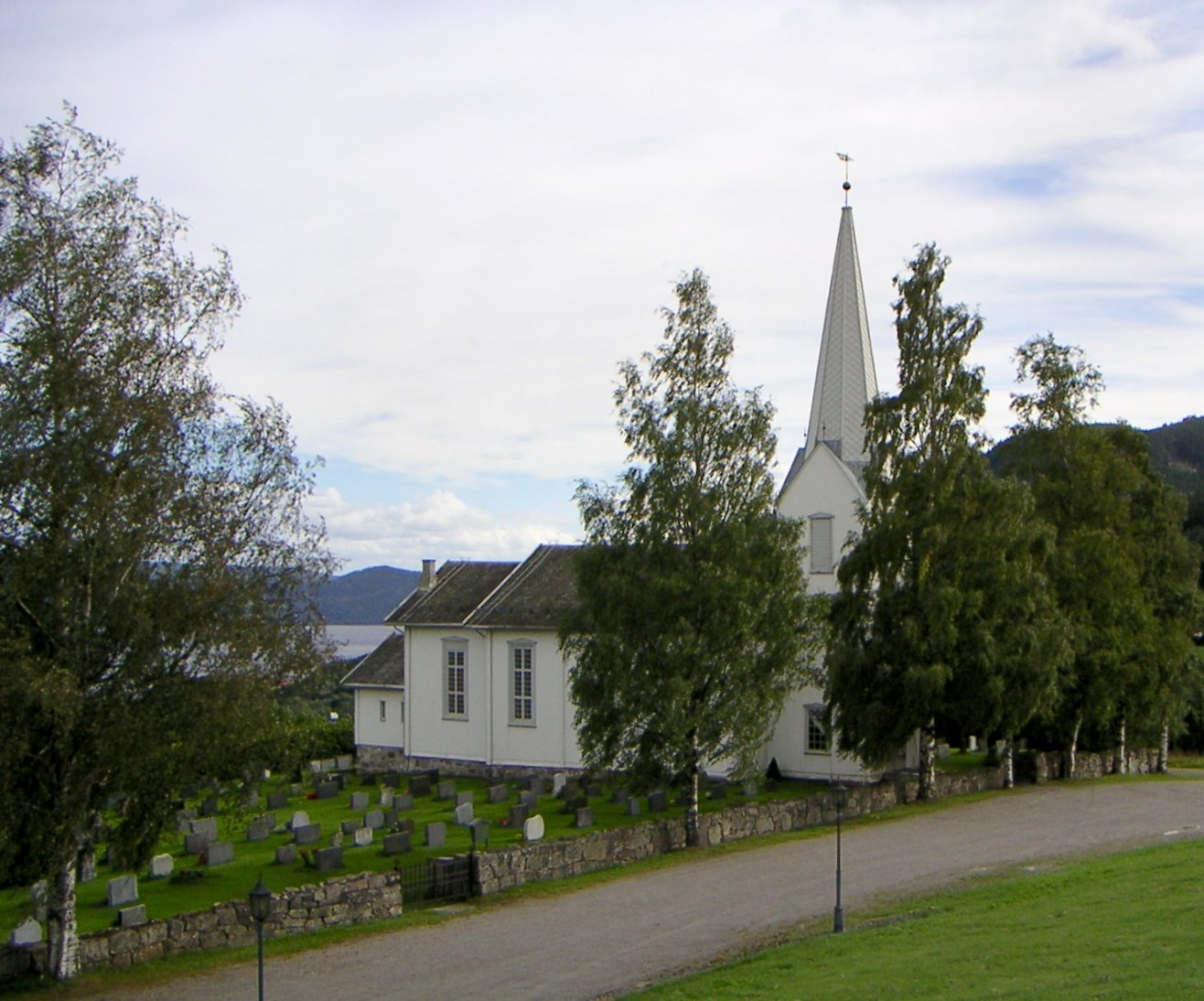
- Feiring Church in Eidsvoll

- Location in Akershus
- Coordinates: 60°29′N 11°09′E
- Country: Norway
- Region: Østlandet
- County: Akershus
- Municipality: Eidsvoll Municipality
- Time zone: UTC+01:00 (CET)
  - Summer (DST): UTC+02:00 (CEST)
- Post Code: 2093

Feiring is an area in Eidsvoll Municipality in Akershus county, Norway.

== History ==
Feiring has around 1000 inhabitants. Feiring lies on the west side of the lake Mjøsa. In 1870 the area became a municipality in its own right when it was split from Hurdal Municipality. Feiring had an area of 102.45 km^{2}. It then merged into Eidsvoll Municipality in 1964. Norwegian National Road 33, the state road between Minnesund and Østre Toten, which runs through Feiring, was built in the 1890s.

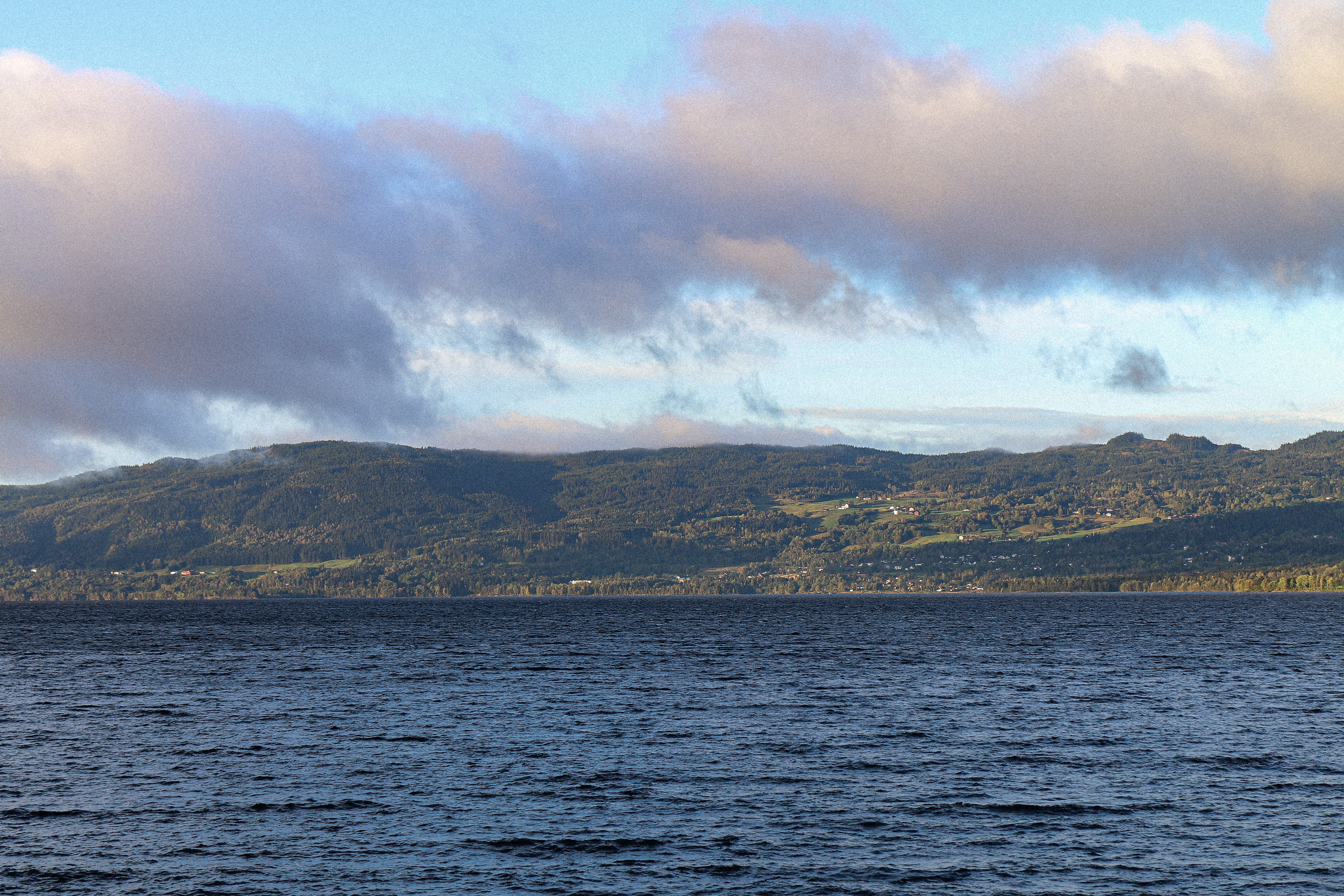
Feiring by Lake Mjøsa. (Photo by Øyvind Holmstad)

Feiring Church (Feiring Kirke) was built in 1870. The original plan had been to restore the old church from 1693, but after debate in the local council it was decided to build a new church. All the same, much of the material which was used to build the new church was borrowed from the old church, which was made of timber.

In the 17th century about 20 copper-mines were set up to the north and north-west of the church, with the smelting works by Flesvikelva. From 1806 to 1818 Carsten Anker ran the Feiring Iron Works by Skreikampen. Feiring Ironworks is one of the best preserved post-Industrial Revolution ironworks in Norway. The housing stands almost completely untouched to this day. The ironworks sites and the remains of the smelter have been restored and Eidsvoll Historical Society has erected information-posts around the work area. In recent years an annual historical play has been performed in the grounds of the ironworks. Ironworks Weekend (Jernverkshelga) is held in August.

The treatment and rehabilitation centre for heart disease, Feiringklinikken (The Feiring clinic), run by the Norwegian Heart and Lung Patient Organization used to lie in the centre of Kirkebygda, down towards Lake Mjøsa, but during the spring of 2018 it moved to Jessheim.

One can still see the mile-marker by Norwegian National Road 33, which indicates the border between Østre Toten and Eidsvoll municipalities. The border signpost between Feiring and Eidsvoll has been removed, so that visitors no longer know when they are driving into the heartlands of Romerike.

== Etymology ==
The Norse form of the name was Fegringar. The name is derived from fagr 'fair; beautiful', and the meaning is 'the beautiful district'.

== Other sources ==
Aage Lunde; Tosterud, Maja (1983–1986) Feirings historie (Eidsvoll : Utgitt av Eidsvoll kommune, 4 books) ISBN 82-90320-01-9
