= Kirkerud =

- Village
- Location in Akershus
- Coordinates: 59°54′12″N 10°29′03″E
- Country: Norway
- Region: Østlandet
- County: Akershus
- Municipality: Bærum
- Time zone: UTC+01:00 (CET)
  - Summer (DST): UTC+02:00 (CEST)

Kirkerud is a village in Bærum, Akershus, Norway.
