= Finstadbru =

- Village
- Location in Akershus
- Coordinates: 59°57′N 11°26′E
- Country: Norway
- Region: Østlandet
- County: Akershus
- Municipality: Aurskog-Høland
- Time zone: UTC+01:00 (CET)
  - Summer (DST): UTC+02:00 (CEST)

Finstadbru is a village in Aurskog-Høland, Akershus, Norway. It is recognized as one of the populated places in the region, contributing to the local community and culture. The village is home to the Aurskog-Finstadbru Sportsklubb, a sports club established on 29 November 1903, which offers various sports activities, including football, handball, cycling, swimming, and Nordic skiing. Additionally, Finstadbru features the Aurskog Finstadbru Golf Club, providing recreational opportunities for golf enthusiasts in the area.
