= Skulerud =

- Village
- Location in Akershus
- Country: Norway
- Region: Østlandet
- County: Akershus
- Municipality: Aurskog-Høland
- Time zone: UTC+01:00 (CET)
  - Summer (DST): UTC+02:00 (CEST)

Skulerud is a place in Aurskog-Høland, Akershus, Norway. It is at the northern part of the lake Skulerudsjøen. Skulerud Station is the end station of the Urskog-Høland line. There is also a dock.
