= Kjøya =

- Village
- Location in Norway Kjøya (Norway)
- Coordinates: 59°45′14″N 10°43′48″E
- Country: Norway
- Region: Østlandet
- County: Akershus
- Municipality: Ås
- Time zone: UTC+01:00 (CET)
  - Summer (DST): UTC+02:00 (CEST)

Kjøya is a village in Ås, Akershus, Norway.
