= Kjøvangen =

- Village
- Location in Akershus Kjøvangen (Norway)
- Coordinates: 59°32′N 10°40′E
- Country: Norway
- Region: Østlandet
- County: Akershus
- Municipality: Vestby
- Time zone: UTC+01:00 (CET)
  - Summer (DST): UTC+02:00 (CEST)

Kjøvangen is a village in Vestby, Akershus, Norway.
