= Lundermoen =

- Village
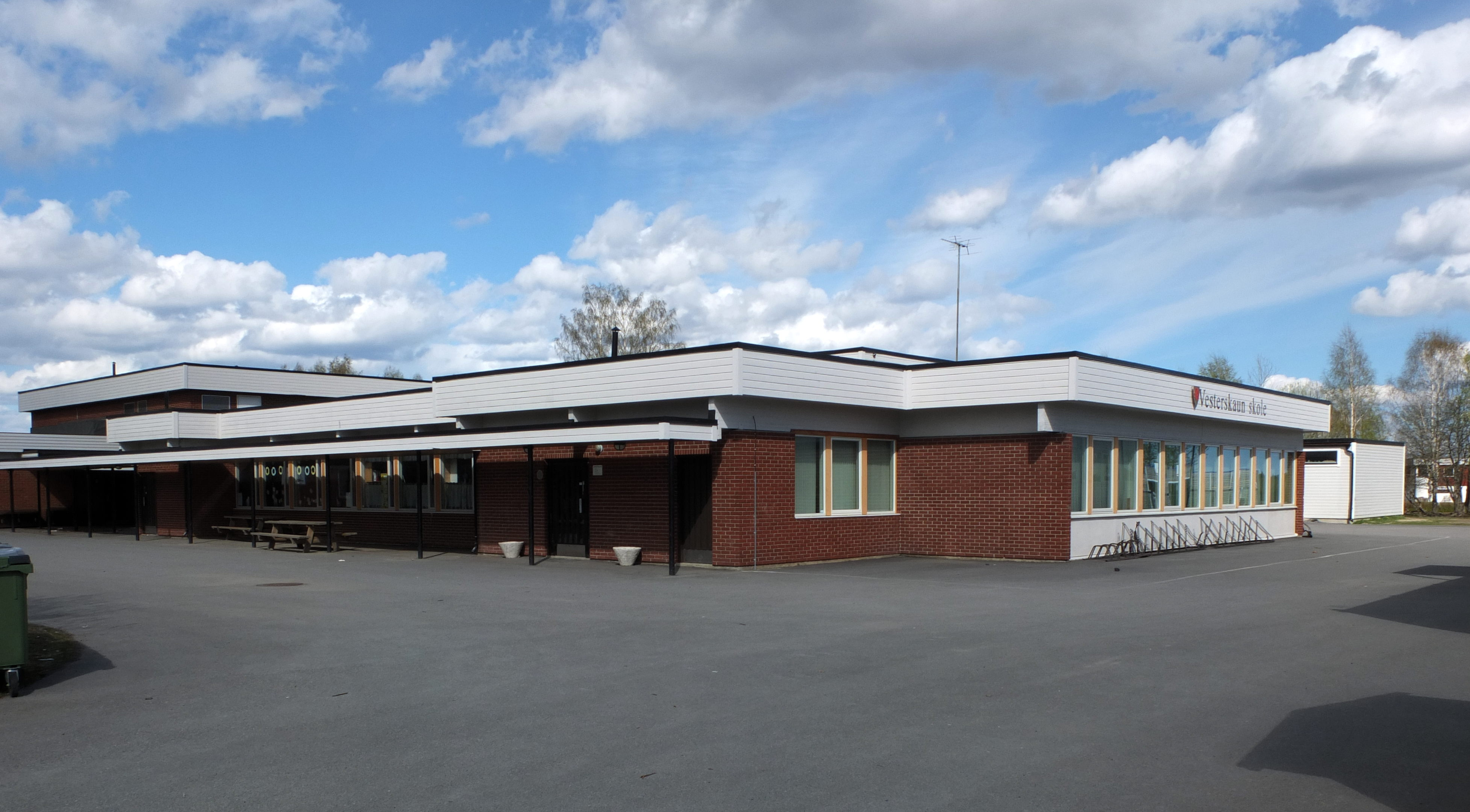
- Vesterskaun school at Lundermoen

- Location in Akershus Lundermoen (Norway)
- Coordinates: 60°0′51″N 11°9′31″E
- Country: Norway
- Region: Østlandet
- County: Akershus
- Municipality: Lillestrøm
- Time zone: UTC+01:00 (CET)
  - Summer (DST): UTC+02:00 (CEST)

Lundermoen is a village in Lillestrøm municipality, Norway. Its population is 1,207.
