= Fosser =

- Village
- Location in Akershus
- Coordinates: 59°49′N 11°29′E
- Country: Norway
- County: Akershus
- District: Romerike
- Municipality: Aurskog-Høland

Area
  - Total: 0.71 km^{2} (0.27 sq mi)

Population (2007)
  - Total: 578
- Time zone: UTC+1 (CET)
  - Summer (DST): UTC+2 (CEST)
- Postal code: 1963

Fosser is a village in the municipality of Aurskog-Høland, Norway. Its population (2007) is 578. Fosser had a station on the Urskog-Hølandsbanen from the opening of the Hølandsbanen in 1898 and until the line was closed down in 1960.

The village derives its name from the local waterfall (waterfall = foss in Norwegian). The waterfall flows from the lake "Øversjøen" into "Fossersjøen" this lake is locally known for large Pike.
