= Tårnåsen =

- Village
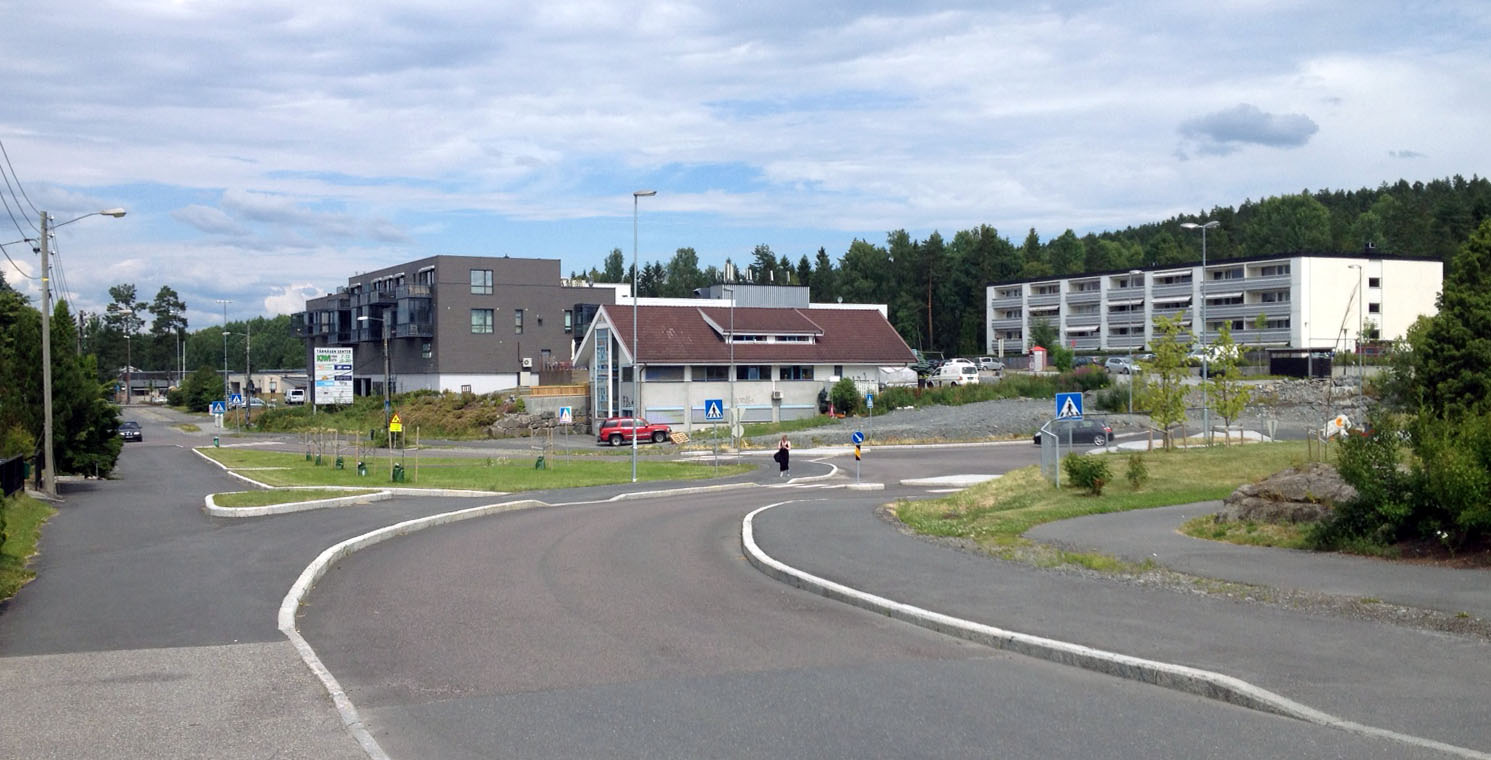
- Tårnåsen center

- Location in Akershus
- Coordinates: 59°48′55″N 10°48′59″E
- Country: Norway
- Region: Østlandet
- County: Akershus
- Municipality: Nordre Follo
- Elevation: 153 m (502 ft)
- Time zone: UTC+01:00 (CET)
  - Summer (DST): UTC+02:00 (CEST)
- Post Code: 1413

Tårnåsen is a village in Nordre Follo, Akershus, Norway.
