= Lierfoss =

- Village
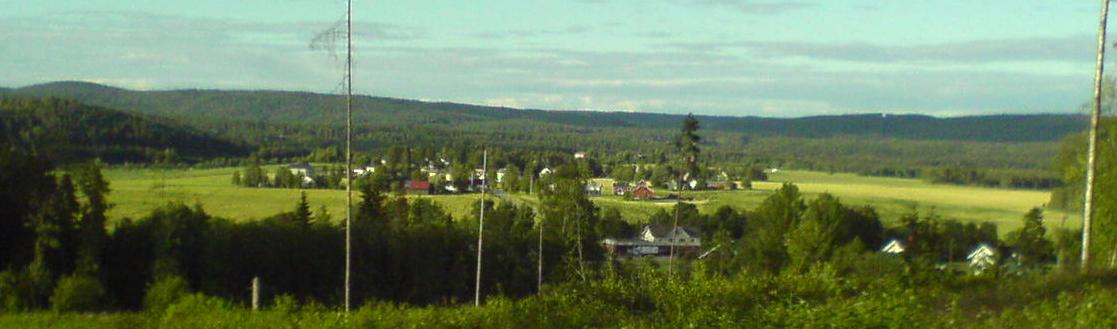
- View of Lierfoss from the path towards Langvannet

- Location in Akershus
- Coordinates: 59°55′N 11°33′E
- Country: Norway
- Region: Østlandet
- County: Akershus
- Municipality: Aurskog-Høland
- Time zone: UTC+01:00 (CET)
  - Summer (DST): UTC+02:00 (CEST)

Lierfoss is a village in Aurskog-Høland, Akershus, Norway.
