= Heer, Norway =

Heer
- Village
- Location in Akershus Heer (Norway)
- Coordinates: 59°41′N 10°39′E
- Country: Norway
- Region: Østlandet
- County: Akershus
- Municipality: Frogn
- Time zone: UTC+01:00 (CET)
  - Summer (DST): UTC+02:00 (CEST)

Heer is a village in Frogn, Akershus, Norway.
