= Berger, Akershus =

Berger
- Village
- Location in Akershus
- Coordinates: 59°49′48″N 10°41′25″E
- Country: Norway
- Region: Østlandet
- County: Akershus
- Municipality: Nesodden
- Time zone: UTC+01:00 (CET)
  - Summer (DST): UTC+02:00 (CEST)

Berger is a village in Nesodden, Akershus, Norway.
