= Hogsetfeltet =

- Village
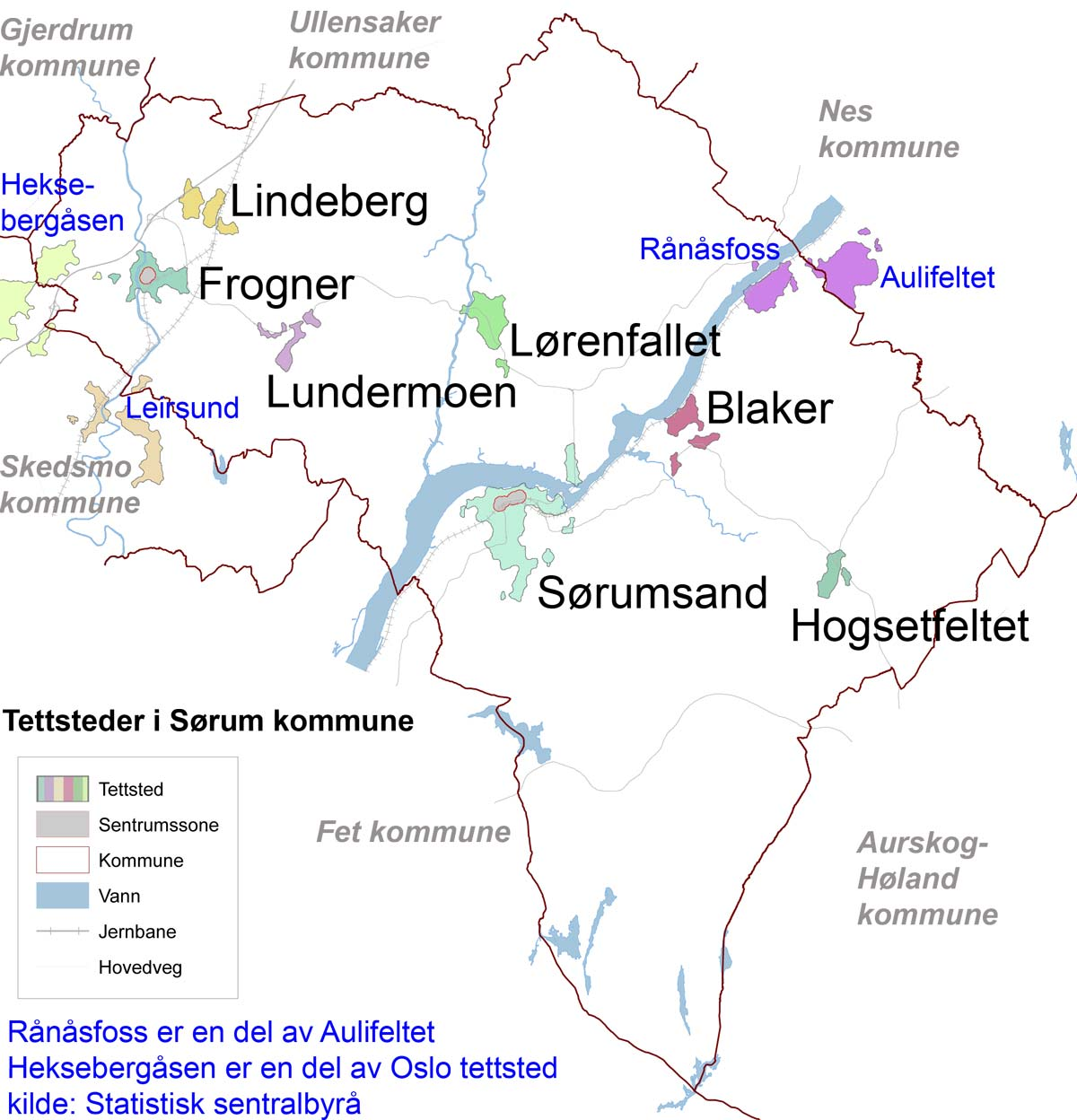
- Hogsetfelt (right) is a Sorum community

- Location in Akershus
- Coordinates: 59.9753°N 11.3611°E
- Country: Norway
- Region: Østlandet
- County: Akershus
- Municipality: Lillestrøm
- Time zone: UTC+01:00 (CET)
  - Summer (DST): UTC+02:00 (CEST)

Hogsetfeltet is a village in Lillestrøm municipality, Norway. Its population is 624.
