= Skiphelle =

- Village
- Location in Akershus
- Coordinates: 59°38′19″N 10°38′39″E
- Country: Norway
- Region: Østlandet
- County: Akershus
- Municipality: Frogn
- Time zone: UTC+01:00 (CET)
  - Summer (DST): UTC+02:00 (CEST)

Skiphelle is a village in Frogn, Akershus, Norway.
