= Lørenfallet =

- Village
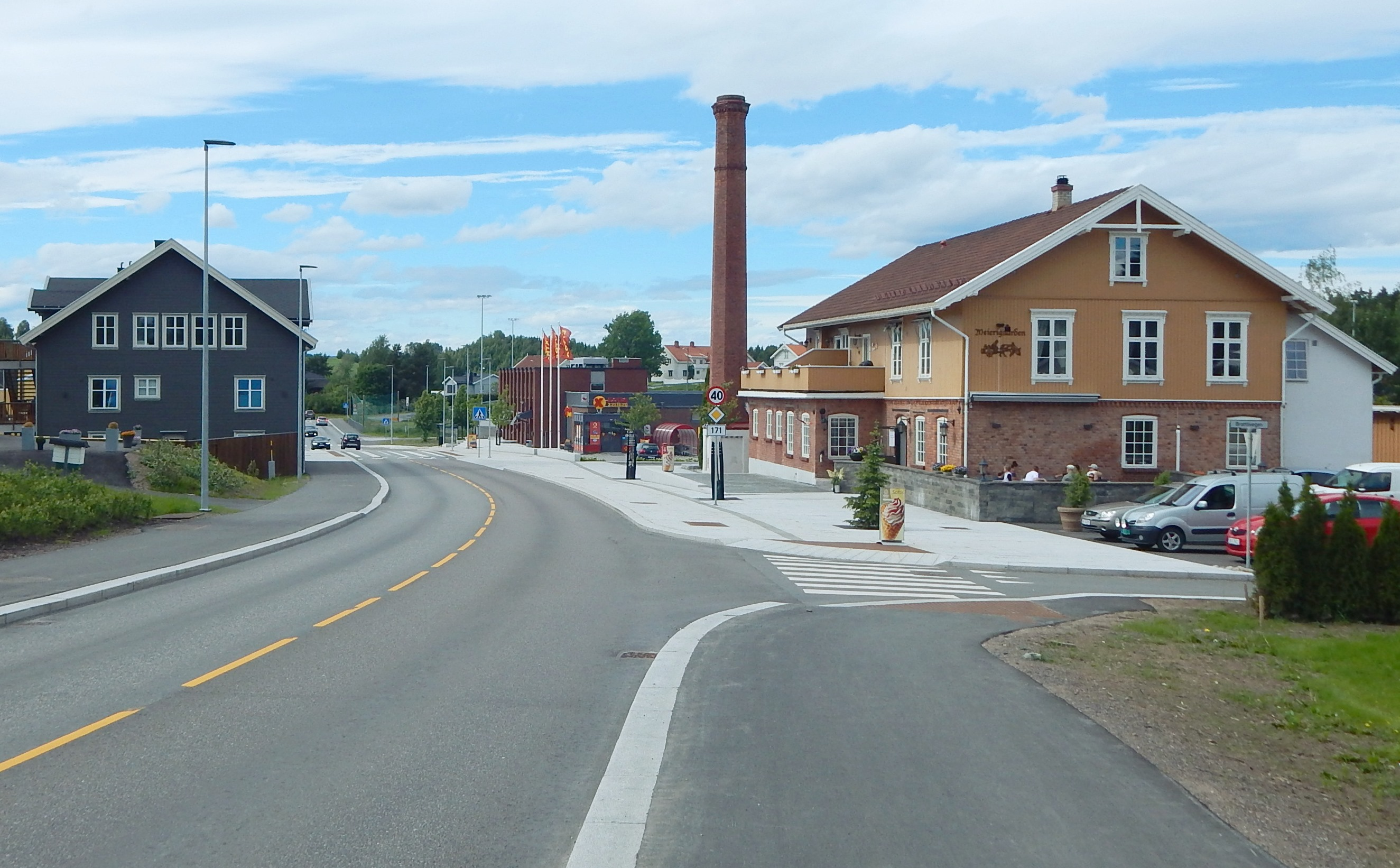
- Nickname: Fallet
- Location in Akershus
- Coordinates: 60°01′11″N 11°13′48″E
- Country: Norway
- Region: Østlandet
- County: Akershus
- Municipality: Lillestrøm
- Time zone: UTC+01:00 (CET)
  - Summer (DST): UTC+02:00 (CEST)

Lørenfallet is a village in Lillestrøm municipality, Norway. Its population is 1,021.
