= Grønlundfjellet =

- Village
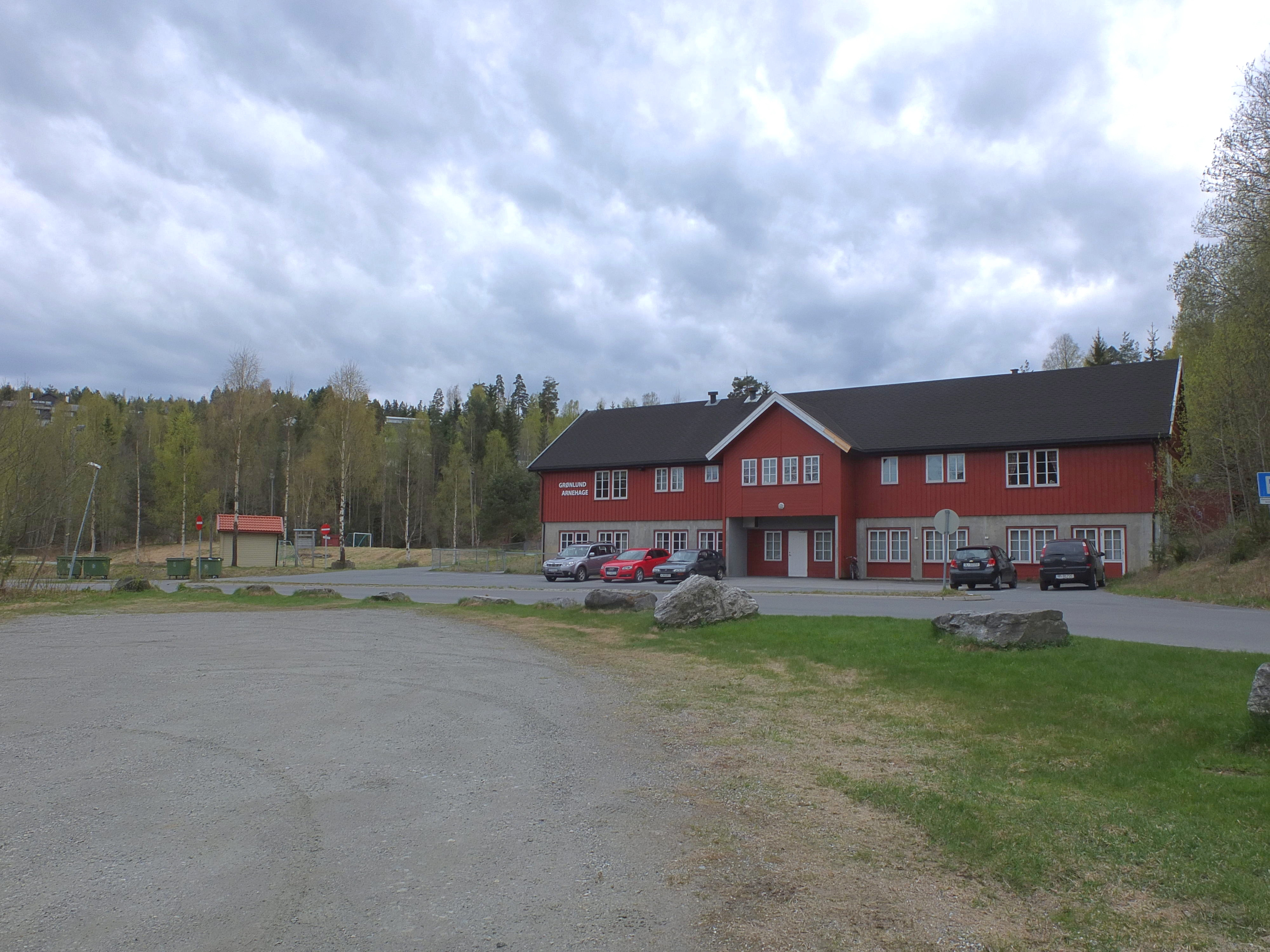

- Location in Akershus
- Coordinates: 60°4′23″N 10°59′56″E
- Country: Norway
- Region: Østlandet
- County: Akershus
- Municipality: Gjerdrum
- Time zone: UTC+01:00 (CET)
  - Summer (DST): UTC+02:00 (CEST)

Grønlundfjellet is a village in the municipality of Gjerdrum, Norway. Its population (2005) was 2,174.
