= Store Brevik =

- Village
- Location in Akershus Store Brevik (Norway)
- Coordinates: 59.5069°N 10.6933°E
- Country: Norway
- Region: Østlandet
- County: Akershus
- Municipality: Vestby
- Time zone: UTC+01:00 (CET)
  - Summer (DST): UTC+02:00 (CEST)

Store Brevik is a village in Vestby, Akershus, Norway.
