= Brudalen =

- Farm
- Location in Akershus
- Coordinates: 60°10′N 11°06′E
- Country: Norway
- Region: Østlandet
- County: Akershus
- Municipality: Ullensaker
- Time zone: UTC+01:00 (CET)
  - Summer (DST): UTC+02:00 (CEST)

Brudalen is a farm in Ullensaker, Akershus, Norway.
