= Nesset, Akershus =

Nesset
- Village
- Location in Akershus
- Country: Norway
- Region: Østlandet
- County: Akershus
- Municipality: Ås
- Time zone: UTC+01:00 (CET)
  - Summer (DST): UTC+02:00 (CEST)

Nesset is a village in Ås, Akershus, Norway.
