= Sem, Akershus =

Sem
- Village
- Location in Akershus
- Coordinates: 59°51′06″N 10°25′18″E
- Country: Norway
- Region: Østlandet
- County: Akershus
- Municipality: Asker
- Time zone: UTC+01:00 (CET)
  - Summer (DST): UTC+02:00 (CEST)

Sem is a village in Asker, Akershus, Norway.
