= Askkroken =

- Village
- Location in Akershus
- Coordinates: 60°03′53″N 10°54′39″E
- Country: Norway
- Region: Østlandet
- County: Akershus
- Municipality: Nittedal
- Time zone: UTC+01:00 (CET)
  - Summer (DST): UTC+02:00 (CEST)

Askkroken is a village in Nittedal, Akershus, Norway.
