= Konglungen =

- Village
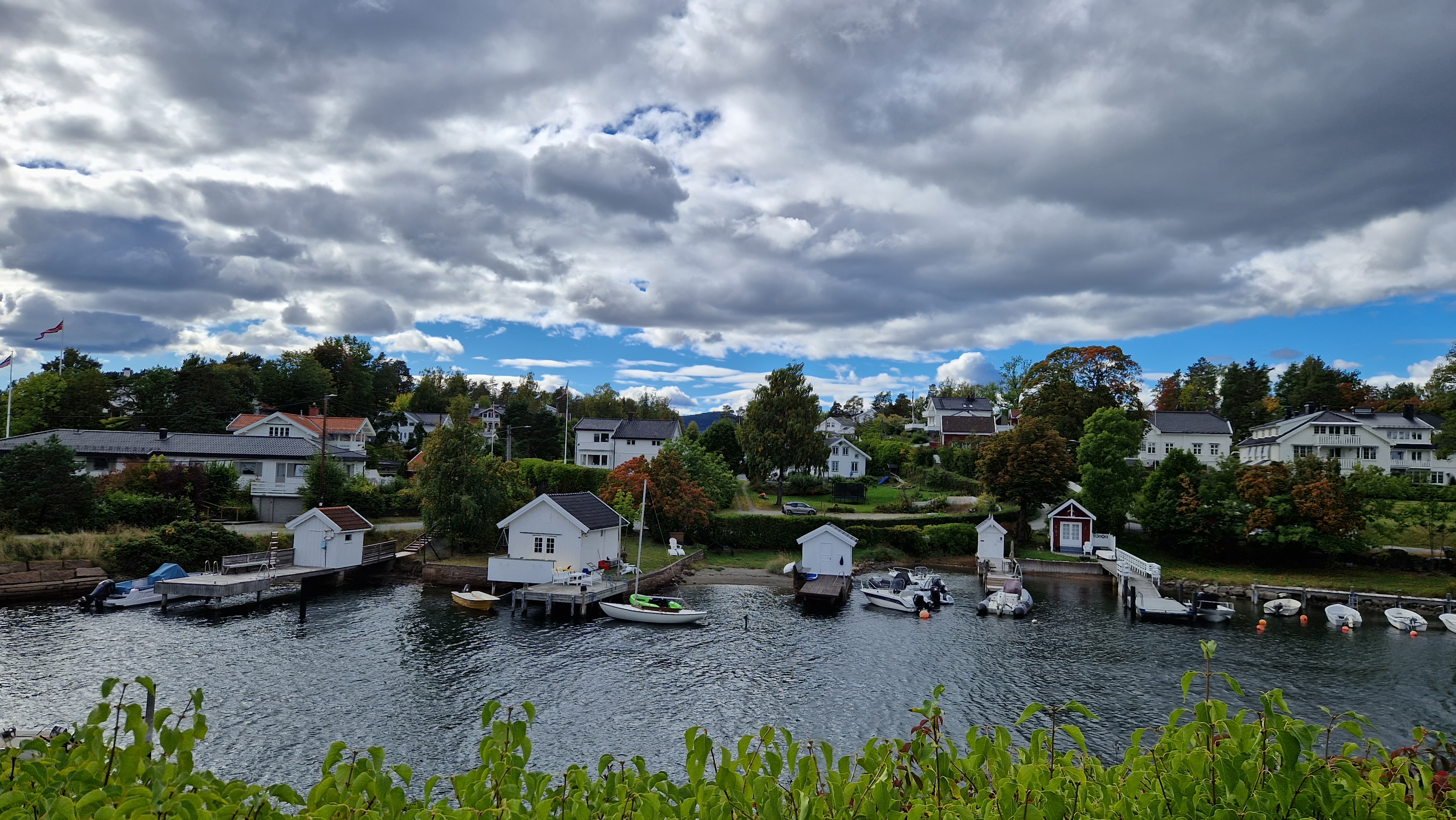
- A lake in Konglungen, Norway
- Interactive map of Konglungen
- Coordinates: 59°50′21″N 10°30′36″E
- Country: Norway
- Region: Østlandet
- County: Akershus
- Time zone: UTC+01:00 (CET)
  - Summer (DST): UTC+02:00 (CEST)

Konglungen is a village in Asker municipality, Norway.

Its population in 1999 was 208, but since 2001 it is not considered an urban settlement by Statistics Norway, and its data is therefore not registered.
