= Algarheim =

- Village
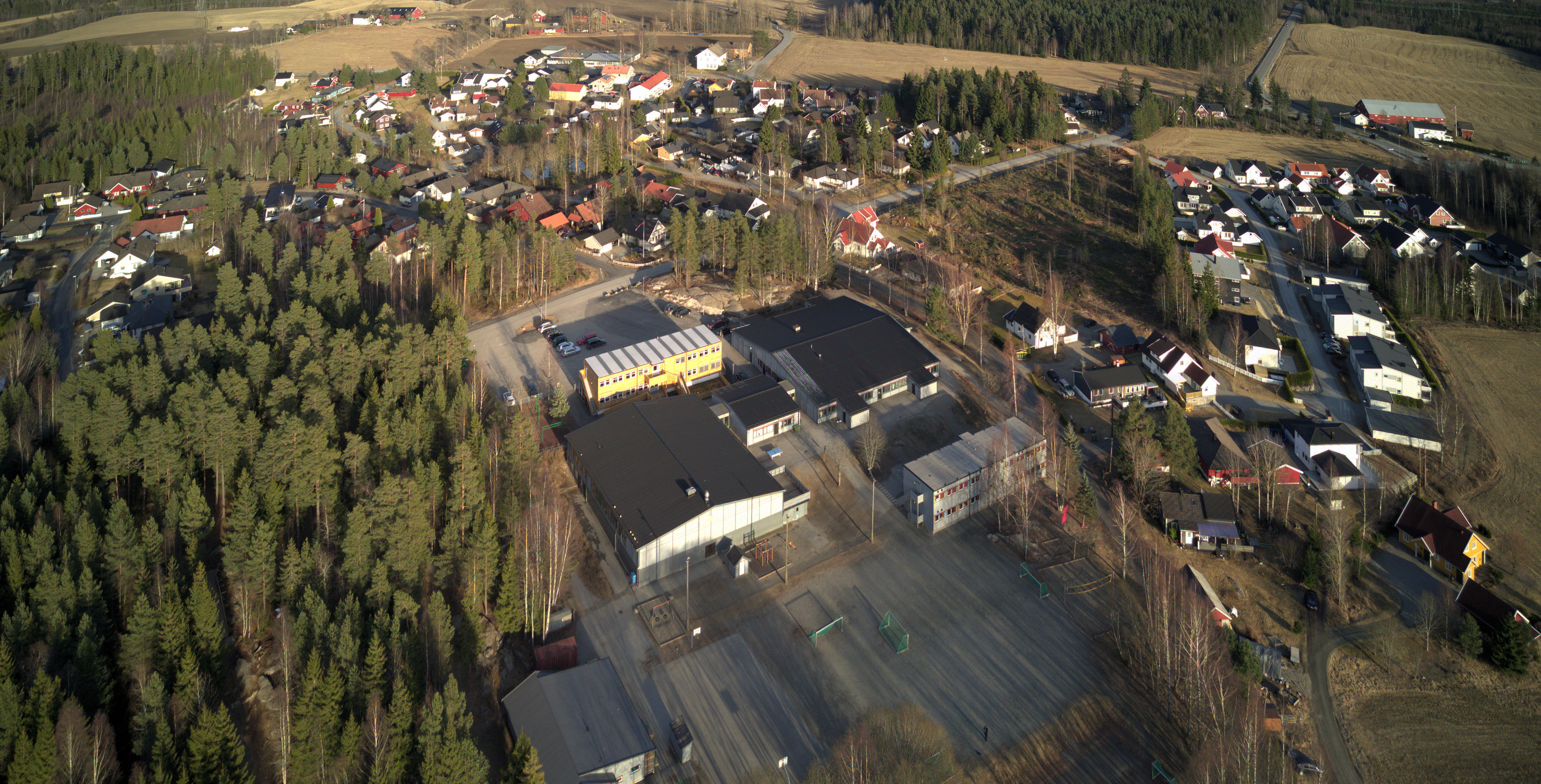

- Location in Akershus Algarheim (Norway)
- Coordinates: 60°8′35″N 11°15′16″E
- Country: Norway
- Region: Østlandet
- County: Akershus
- Municipality: Ullensaker
- Time zone: UTC+01:00 (CET)
  - Summer (DST): UTC+02:00 (CEST)

Algarheim is a village in the municipality of Ullensaker, Norway. Its population (2005) is 371. Algarheim was from 2008 to 2013 and again from 2020 in Statistics Norway's settlement statistics counted as part of Jessheim. In the past there has been both a school, a camp, a post office, and a couple of larger farms connected to Algarheim.

The name Algarheim itself originally comes from a large farm in the area. Algarheim had its own general store and post office until the end of the 1990s. The place also has its own public kindergarten and primary school Algarheim School.

The place was heavily developed from the mid-1970s with new housing estates consisting of villas, as well as a new primary school.
