= Enebakkneset =

Coordinates: 59°47′N 11°15′E

- Village
- Location in Akershus
- Country: Norway
- Region: Østlandet
- County: Akershus
- Municipality: Lillestrøm
- Time zone: UTC+01:00 (CET)
  - Summer (DST): UTC+02:00 (CEST)

Enebakkneset is a village in Akershus, Norway.
