= Vardeåsen =

- Village
- Nickname: Varden
- Location in Akershus Vardeåsen (Norway)
- Coordinates: 60°01′12″N 11°03′06″E
- Country: Norway
- Region: Østlandet
- County: Akershus
- Municipality: Lillestrøm
- Time zone: UTC+01:00 (CET)
  - Summer (DST): UTC+02:00 (CEST)

Vardeåsen is a village in Lillestrøm, Akershus, Norway.
