= Borgen, Ullensaker =

Borgen
- Village
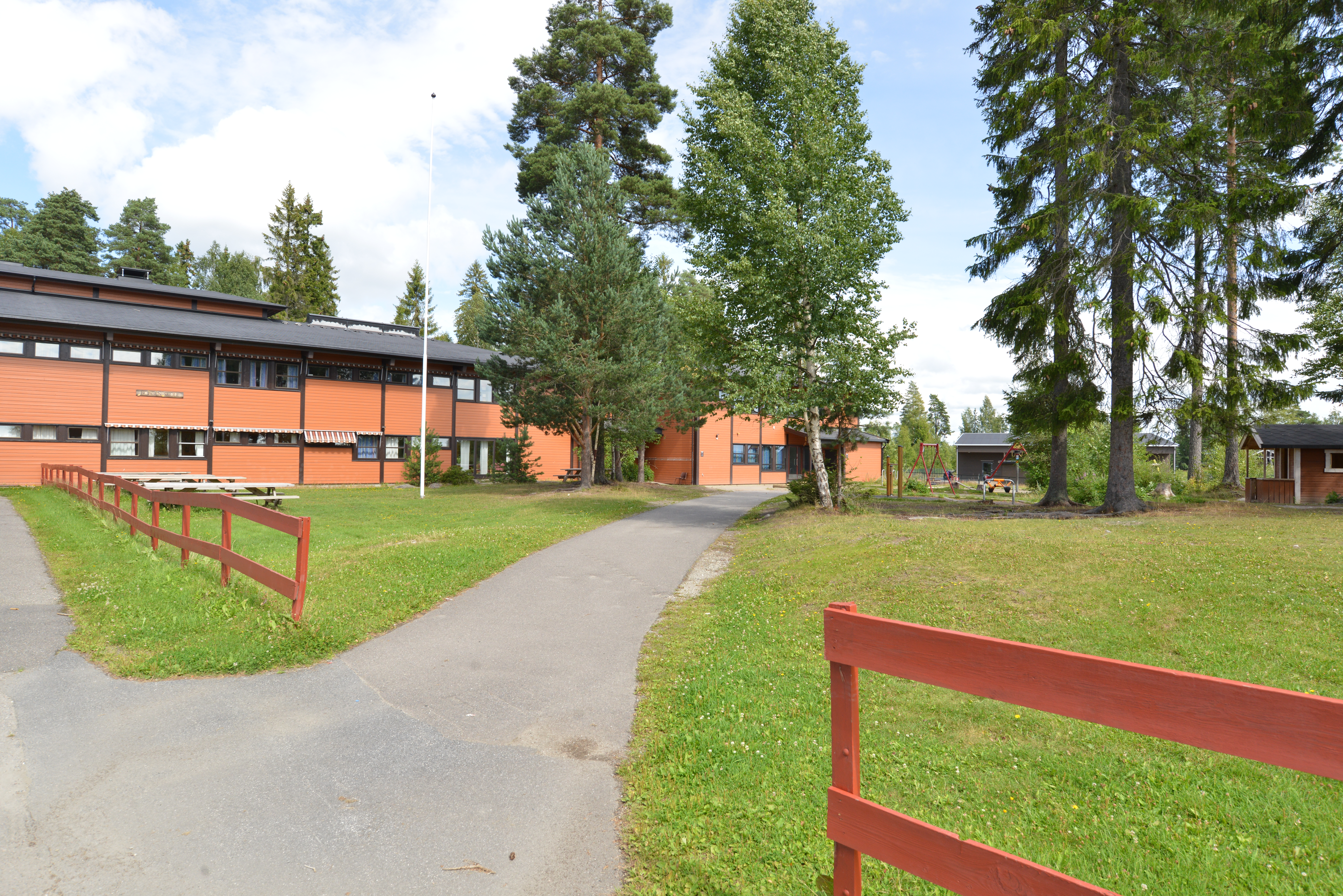
- Borgen elementary school

- Location within Akershus Location within Norway
- Country: Norway
- Region: Østlandet
- County: Akershus
- Time zone: UTC+01:00 (CET)
  - Summer (DST): UTC+02:00 (CEST)

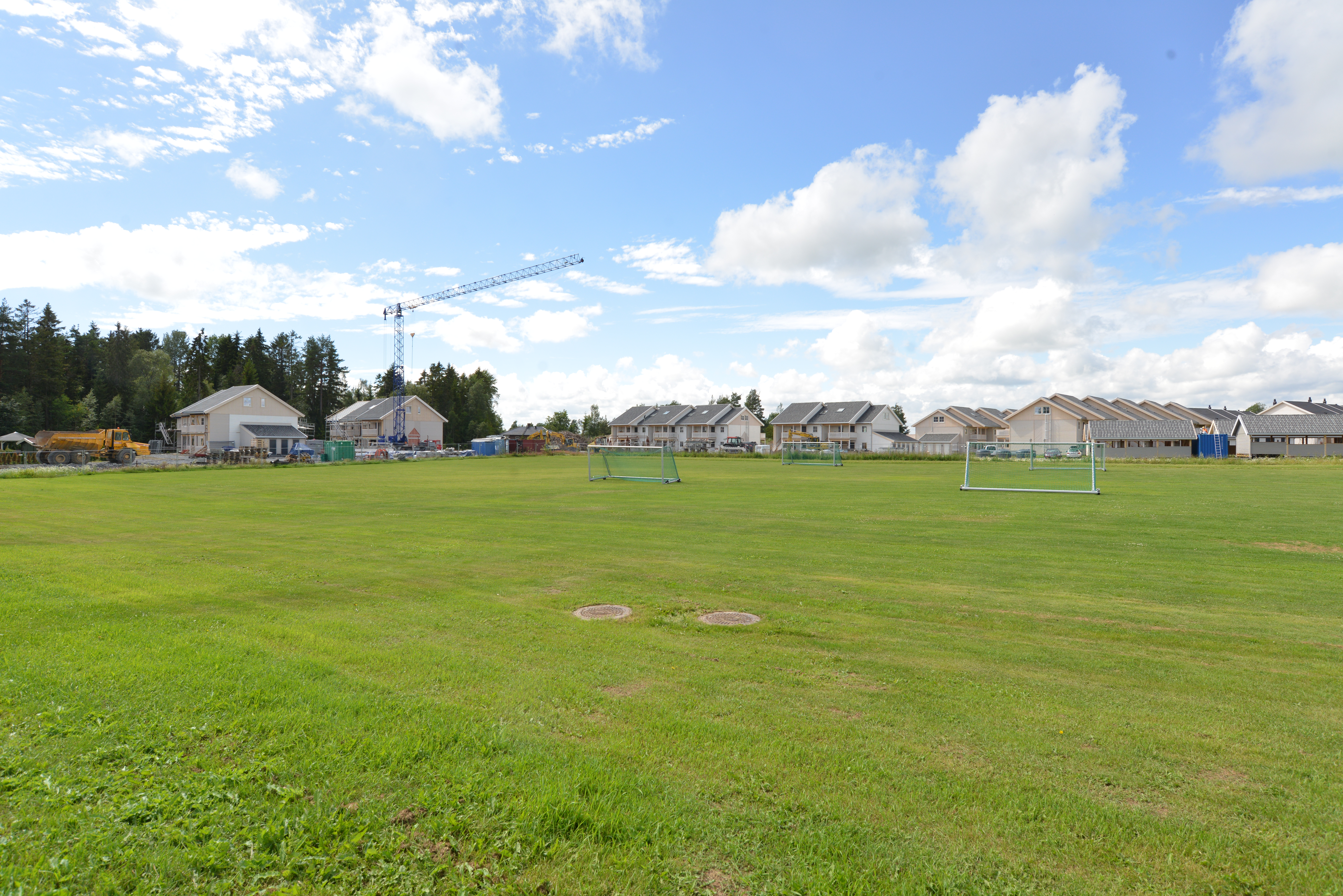
Borgen has experienced a significant population increase over the last decade (2010-2020)

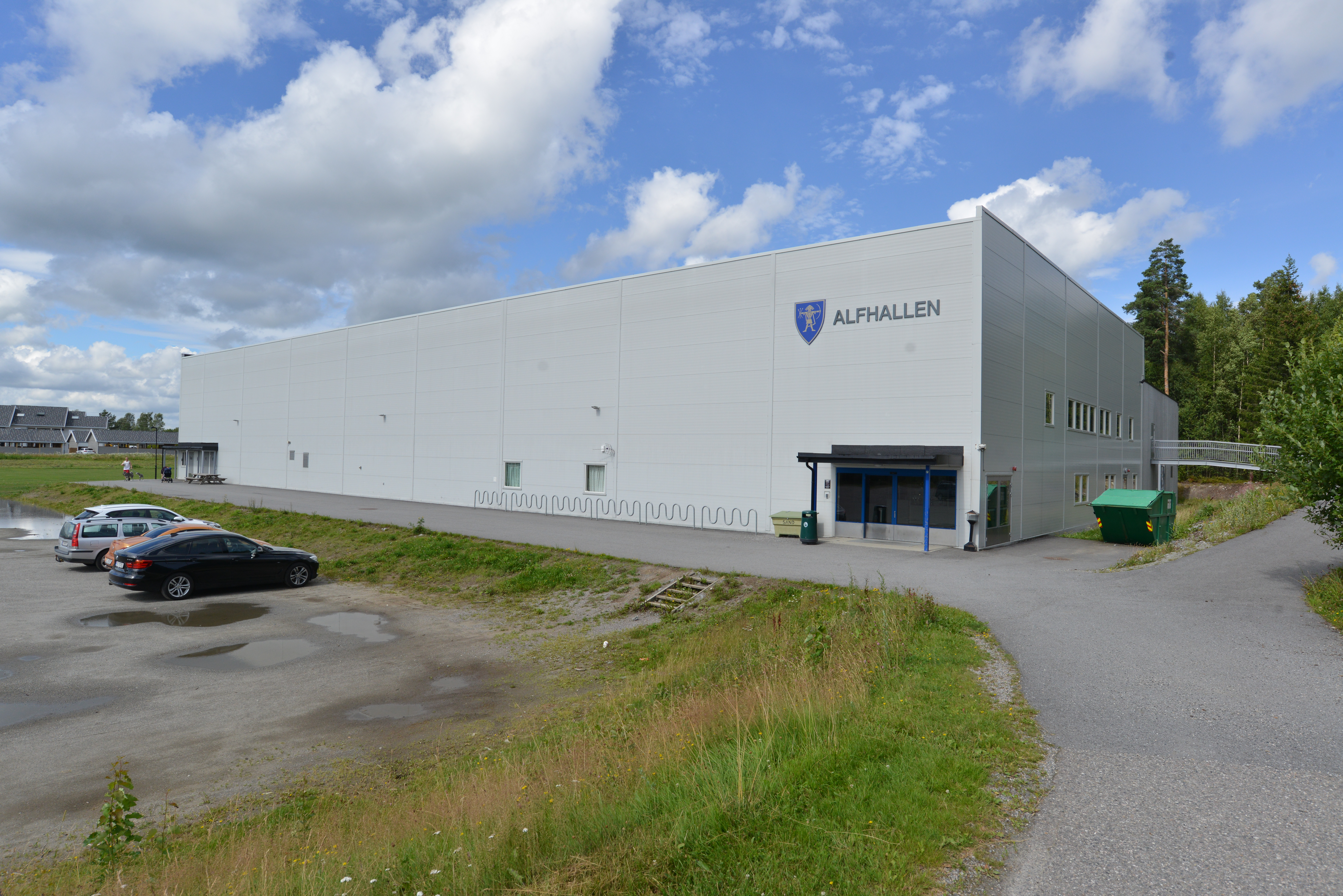
Alfhallen at Borgen is homecourt for Borgen Idrettslag

Borgen is a village in the municipality of Ullensaker, Norway. Its population on 1 January 1 2020 was 1,343. Borgen has both soccer and handball teams.
