= Mogreina =

- Village
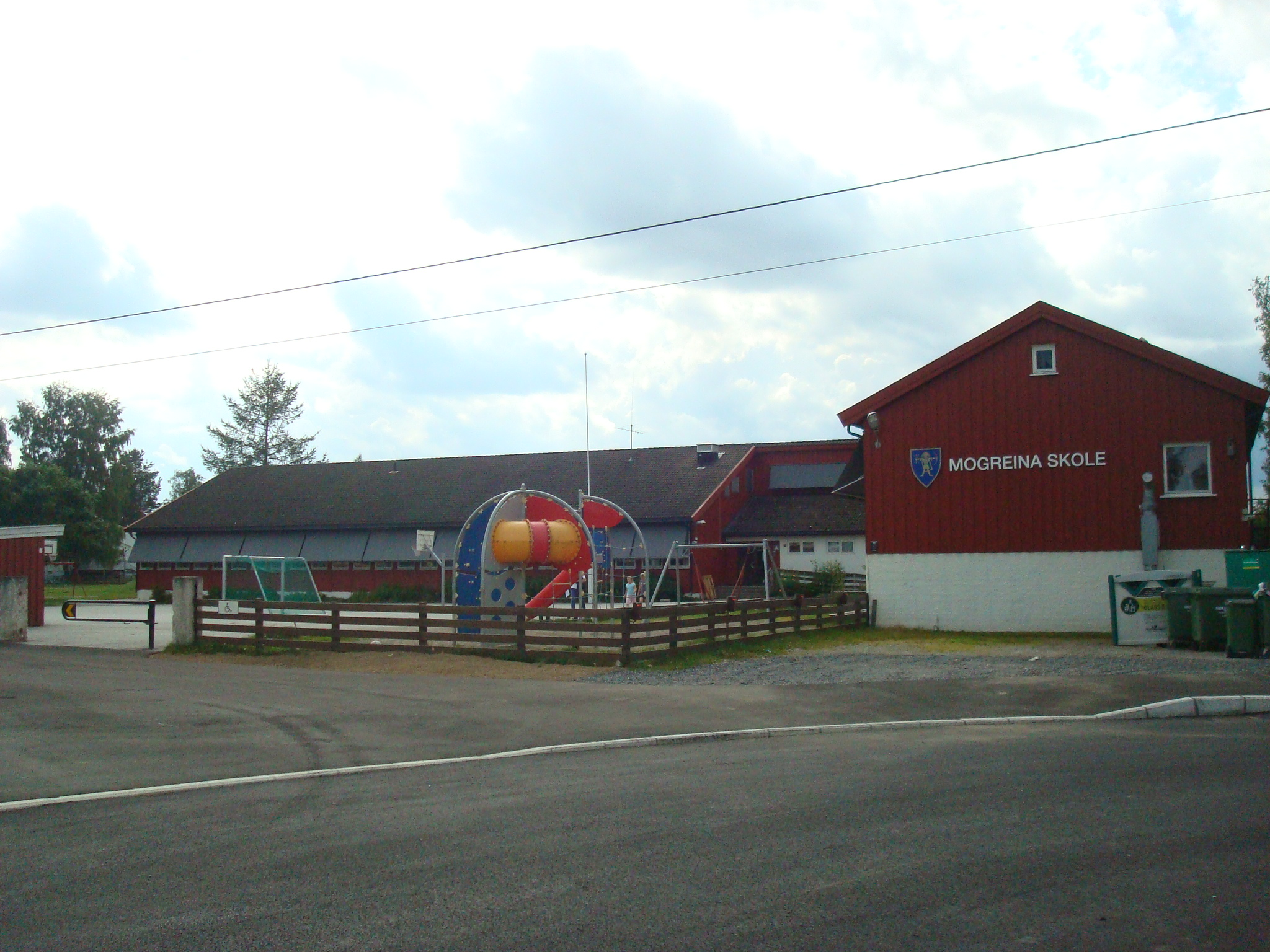
- Mogreina school in Akershus.

- Location in Akershus
- Coordinates: 60°13′49″N 11°09′54″E
- Country: Norway
- Region: Østlandet
- County: Akershus
- Municipality: Ullensaker
- Time zone: UTC+01:00 (CET)
  - Summer (DST): UTC+02:00 (CEST)

Mogreina is a village in Ullensaker, Akershus, Norway. It is located 10 kilometres (6.2 mi) away from Gardermoen. It has one school with around 200 students.
