= Løvstad =

Village in Norway

- Village
- Location in Akershus Løvstad (Norway)
- Coordinates: 60°6′38″N 10°50′33″E
- Country: Norway
- Region: Østlandet
- County: Akershus
- Municipality: Nittedal
- Time zone: UTC+01:00 (CET)
  - Summer (DST): UTC+02:00 (CEST)

Løvstad is a village in the municipality of Nittedal, Norway. Its population (2005) is 1,540. The alternative spelling Løstad was considered by the State Map Agency as the Norwegian name authority in 2005, and rejected.
