= Kringler =

- Village
- Location in Akershus Kringler (Norway)
- Coordinates: 60°14′N 10°59′E
- Country: Norway
- Region: Østlandet
- County: Akershus
- Municipality: Nannestad
- Time zone: UTC+01:00 (CET)
  - Summer (DST): UTC+02:00 (CEST)

Kringler is a village in Nannestad, Akershus, Norway. Located in the village is the Kringler Guest House, a 34-room establishment.
