= Hammerstad =

- Village
- Location in Akershus
- Coordinates: 60°20′N 11°13′E
- Country: Norway
- Region: Østlandet
- County: Akershus
- Municipality: Eidsvoll
- Time zone: UTC+01:00 (CET)
  - Summer (DST): UTC+02:00 (CEST)

Hammerstad is a village in Eidsvoll municipality, Norway.

Its population in 1999 was 992, but since 2001 it is considered a part of the urban area of Eidsvoll.
