= Onsrud =

- Village
- Location in Akershus
- Coordinates: 60°08′00″N 11°17′14″E
- Country: Norway
- Region: Østlandet
- County: Akershus
- Time zone: UTC+01:00 (CET)
  - Summer (DST): UTC+02:00 (CEST)

Onsrud is a village in Ullensaker, Akershus, Norway.
