= Rustadmoen =

- Village
- Location in Akershus
- Coordinates: 60°12′37″N 10°57′03″E
- Country: Norway
- Region: Østlandet
- County: Akershus
- Municipality: Nannestad
- Elevation: 206 m (676 ft)
- Time zone: UTC+01:00 (CET)
  - Summer (DST): UTC+02:00 (CEST)

Rustadmoen is a village in Nannestad, Akershus, Norway.

== Information ==
Rustadmoen is situated in Akershus, Norway. The village is situated 35 km from Oslo.
