= Rasta, Akershus =

Rasta
- Village
- Location in Akershus Rasta (Norway)
- Coordinates: 59°55′21″N 10°56′24″E
- Country: Norway
- Region: Østlandet
- County: Akershus
- Municipality: Lørenskog
- Time zone: UTC+01:00 (CET)
  - Summer (DST): UTC+02:00 (CEST)

Rasta is a suburban village in Lørenskog, Akershus, Norway. It's known for its suburban setting and closeness to Oslo, making it attractive for commuters who can't afford the high rent but work there nevertheless.
