= Bjerkås =

- Village
- Location in Akershus Bjerkås (Norway)
- Coordinates: 59.7925°N 10.4858°E
- Country: Norway
- Region: Østlandet
- County: Akershus
- Municipality: Asker
- Time zone: UTC+01:00 (CET)
  - Summer (DST): UTC+02:00 (CEST)

Bjerkås is a village in Asker municipality, Norway.
