= Bekkeberga =

- Village
- Location in Akershus Bekkeberga (Norway)
- Coordinates: 60°05′18″N 10°59′56″E
- Country: Norway
- Region: Østlandet
- County: Akershus
- Municipality: Gjerdrum
- Time zone: UTC+01:00 (CET)
  - Summer (DST): UTC+02:00 (CEST)

Bekkeberga is a village in Gjerdrum, Akershus, Norway, lying to the northwest of Ask.
