= Alværn =

Coordinates: 59.82094°N 10.62769°E

- Village
- Location in Akershus
- Country: Norway
- Region: Østlandet
- County: Akershus
- Municipality: Nesodden
- Time zone: UTC+01:00 (CET)
  - Summer (DST): UTC+02:00 (CEST)

Alværn is a village in Nesodden, Akershus, Norway.
