= Blystadlia =

- Village
- Location in Akershus
- Coordinates: 59°55′50″N 11°2′7″E
- Country: Norway
- Region: Østlandet
- County: Akershus
- Municipality: Rælingen
- Time zone: UTC+01:00 (CET)
  - Summer (DST): UTC+02:00 (CEST)

Blystadlia is a village in Rælingen municipality, Norway, located near the southern border towards Lørenskog. Blystadlia was built in the 1970s, and has about 4,000 inhabitants.
