= Hellerud, Akershus =

Hellerud
- Village
- Location in Akershus Hellerud (Norway)
- Coordinates: 59°58′43″N 10°58′54″E
- Country: Norway
- Region: Østlandet
- County: Akershus
- Municipality: Lillestrøm
- Time zone: UTC+01:00 (CET)
  - Summer (DST): UTC+02:00 (CEST)

Hellerud is a village in Lillestrøm, Akershus, Norway.
