= Blylaget =

- Village
- Location in Akershus
- Coordinates: 59°47′N 10°42′E
- Country: Norway
- Region: Østlandet
- County: Akershus
- Municipality: Nesodden, Frogn
- Time zone: UTC+01:00 (CET)
  - Summer (DST): UTC+02:00 (CEST)

Blylaget is a village in Nesodden and Frogn in Akershus, Norway.
