= Bråtesletta =

- Village
- Location in Akershus
- Coordinates: 60°02′48″N 11°03′04″E
- Country: Norway
- Region: Østlandet
- County: Akershus
- Municipality: Gjerdrum
- Time zone: UTC+01:00 (CET)
  - Summer (DST): UTC+02:00 (CEST)

Bråtesletta is a village in Gjerdrum, Akershus, Norway.
