= Rykkinn =

- Village
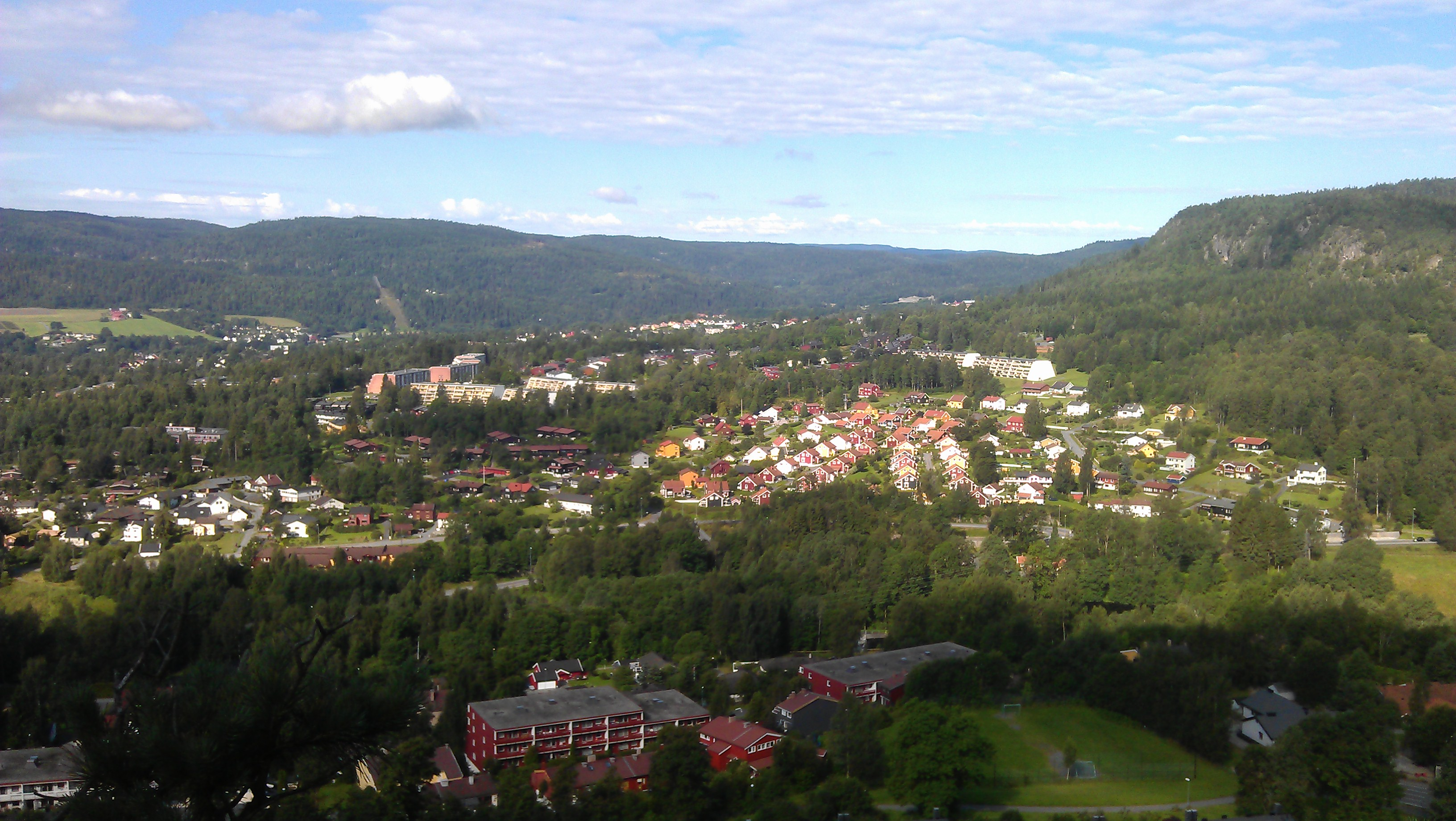

- Location in Akershus
- Country: Norway
- Region: Østlandet
- County: Akershus
- District: Viken
- Municipality: Bærum
- Time zone: UTC+01:00 (CET)
  - Summer (DST): UTC+02:00 (CEST)
- Post Code: 1349

Rykkinn is a commuter town in the north-west of Bærum, Akershus county, Norway with 9217 inhabitants (2022). It is located between Kolsås and the area of Skui and Vøyenenga.

Rykkinn consists mainly of apartment blocks and smaller houses. Most of Rykkinn's buildings and infrastructure were built in the early 1970s due to the growing demands for housing near Oslo. The mix of houses and apartments can therefore be seen as a part of the social democratic ideology that heavily influenced Norwegian society at that time: People of different classes were to live peacefully side by side in the new suburb. Perhaps for this reason Rykkinn has had a development more akin to Oslo's eastern boroughs which is quite different from much of the otherwise affluent municipality.

Rykkinn also has a shopping mall, which used to contain Norway's highest educational facility for commercial trading - Kjøpmannsinstituttet. Rykkinn is home to the Norwegian national basketball venue, and they also have a basketball team in the Top series of Norwegian basketball called 3B/Bærums Verk.

Harald Eia, a Norwegian comedian who has often included references to Rykkinn in his performances, was born here. Nikolaj Frobenius, an author and screenwriter, wrote an autobiographical novel about the years he lived in Rykkinn.
