= Torget, Hurdal =

Torget
- Village
- Location in Akershus Torget (Norway)
- Coordinates: 60°26′N 11°04′E
- Country: Norway
- Region: Østlandet
- County: Akershus
- Municipality: Hurdal
- Time zone: UTC+01:00 (CET)
  - Summer (DST): UTC+02:00 (CEST)

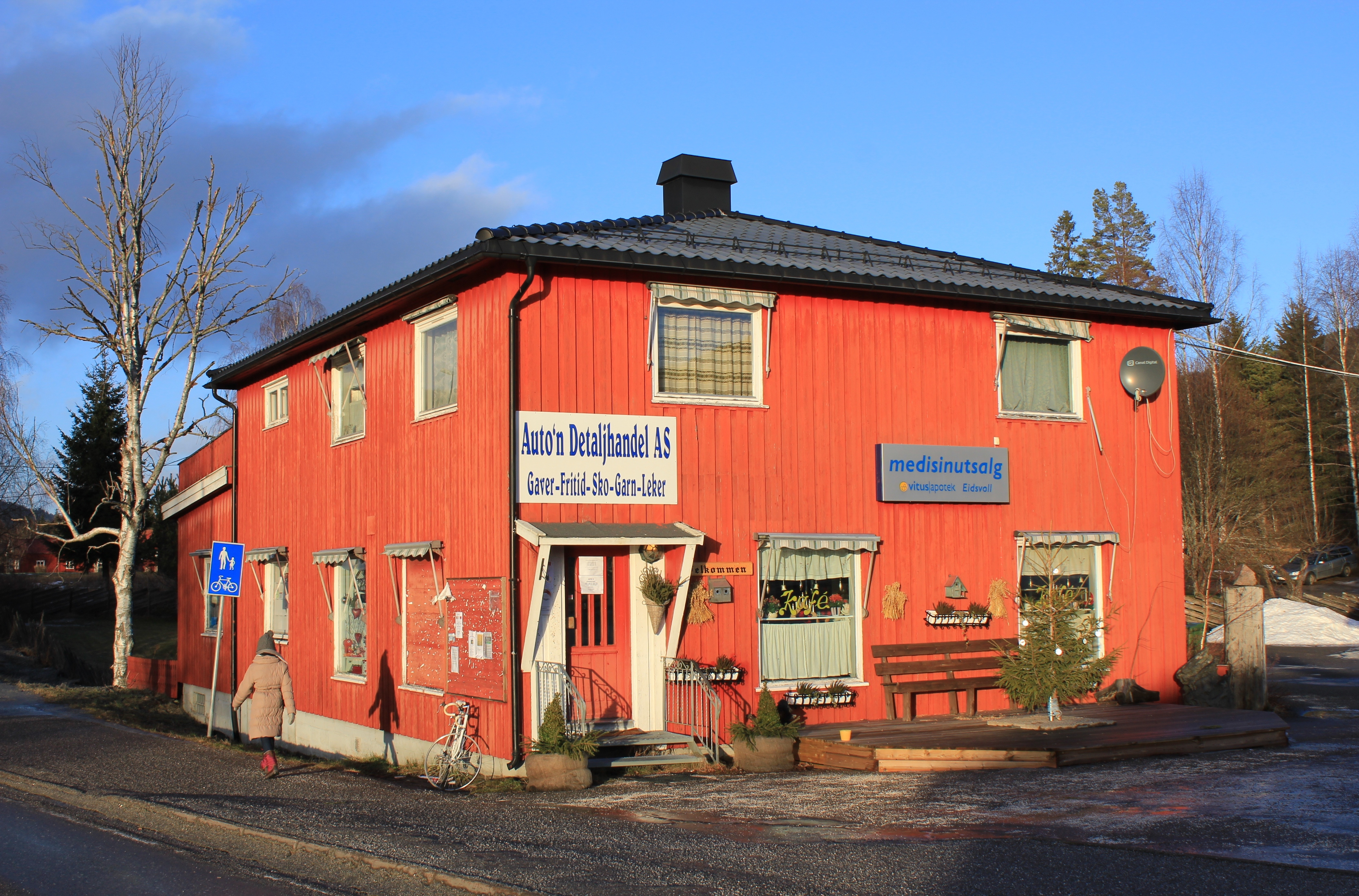
Building in Hurdal

Torget is the administrative centre of Hurdal municipality, Norway. It is located at the northern end of the lake Hurdalsjøen. Its population (2005) is 513.
