= Solberg, Akershus =

Solberg
- Village
- Location in Akershus
- Coordinates: 59°48′11″N 10°23′21″E
- Country: Norway
- Region: Østlandet
- County: Akershus
- Municipality: Asker
- Time zone: UTC+01:00 (CET)
  - Summer (DST): UTC+02:00 (CEST)

Solberg is a farm in Asker, Akershus, Norway.
