= Røykås =

- Village
- Location in Akershus
- Coordinates: 59°55′33″N 10°55′54″E
- Country: Norway
- Region: Østlandet
- County: Akershus
- Municipality: Lørenskog
- Time zone: UTC+01:00 (CET)
  - Summer (DST): UTC+02:00 (CEST)

Røykås is a village in Lørenskog, Akershus, Norway.
