= Drengsrud =

- Village
- Location in Akershus Drengsrud (Norway)
- Coordinates: 59°49′34″N 10°24′19″E
- Country: Norway
- Region: Østlandet
- County: Akershus
- Municipality: Asker
- Time zone: UTC+01:00 (CET)
  - Summer (DST): UTC+02:00 (CEST)

Drengsrud is a village in Asker municipality, Akershus county, Norway.
