= Finstadjordet =

Coordinates: 59°54′54″N 10°58′09″E

- Village
- Location in Akershus
- Country: Norway
- Region: Østlandet
- County: Akershus
- Time zone: UTC+01:00 (CET)
  - Summer (DST): UTC+02:00 (CEST)

Finstadjordet is a densely populated place in the Lørenskog municipality in Akershus, Norway. Finstadjordet is located furthest east in the municipality towards Østmarka . Borders towards the places: Løkenåsen, Skårer, Sørli, Hammer and Losby . Finstadjordet is divided into the areas of Finstad, Løken and Nesåsen . The buildings are mixed and consist of terraced houses, blocks of flats, terraced blocks and detached houses. On the outskirts of the settlement there are also some farms.

Famous people from Finstadjordet: John Carew, Elisabeth Carew
