= Sjøstrand, Asker =

Sjøstrand
- Village
- Nickname: Akershus
- Location in Akershus
- Coordinates: 59°47′51″N 10°29′30″E
- Country: Norway
- Region: Østlandet
- County: Akershus
- Municipality: Asker
- Time zone: UTC+01:00 (CET)
  - Summer (DST): UTC+02:00 (CEST)

Sjøstrand is a fishing village in Asker, Akershus, Norway.
