= Kjul =

- Village
- Location in Akershus Kjul (Norway)
- Coordinates: 60°01′37″N 10°53′42″E
- Country: Norway
- Region: Østlandet
- County: Akershus
- Municipality: Nittedal
- Time zone: UTC+01:00 (CET)
  - Summer (DST): UTC+02:00 (CEST)

Kjul is a small village in Nittedal, Akershus, Norway.
