= Styrigrenda =

- Village
- Location in Akershus Styrigrenda (Norway)
- Country: Norway
- Region: Østlandet
- County: Akershus
- Municipality: Eidsvoll
- Time zone: UTC+01:00 (CET)
  - Summer (DST): UTC+02:00 (CEST)

Styrigrenda is a village in Eidsvoll, Akershus, Norway.
