= Brevik, Akershus =

Brevik
- Village
- Location in Akershus Brevik (Norway)
- Coordinates: 59°45′09″N 10°42′43″E
- Country: Norway
- Region: Østlandet
- County: Akershus
- Municipality: Frogn
- Time zone: UTC+01:00 (CET)
  - Summer (DST): UTC+02:00 (CEST)

Brevik is a village in Frogn, Akershus county, Norway.
