= Svarterud =

- Village
- Location within Akershus Location within Norway
- Coordinates: 59°47′58″N 11°15′21″E
- Country: Norway
- Region: Østlandet
- County: Akershus
- Municipality: Lillestrøm
- Time zone: UTC+01:00 (CET)
  - Summer (DST): UTC+02:00 (CEST)

Svarterud is a village in Lillestrøm, Akershus, Norway.
