= Åkrene =

- Village
- Location in Akershus
- Coordinates: 59°56′36″N 11°6′16″E
- Country: Norway
- Region: Østlandet
- County: Akershus
- Municipality: Lillestrøm
- Time zone: UTC+01:00 (CET)
  - Summer (DST): UTC+02:00 (CEST)

Åkrene is a village in the municipality of Lillestrøm, Norway, located between Lillestrøm and Fetsund. Its population (2005) is 259.
