= Trollåsen =

- Village
- Location within Akershus Location within Norway
- Coordinates: 59°49′18″N 10°46′40″E
- Country: Norway
- Region: Østlandet
- County: Akershus
- Municipality: Nordre Follo
- Time zone: UTC+01:00 (CET)
  - Summer (DST): UTC+02:00 (CEST)

Trollåsen is a village in Nordre Follo, Akershus, Norway.
