= Dalsroa =

- Village
- Location within Akershus Location within Norway
- Coordinates: 59°46′03″N 11°21′30″E
- Country: Norway
- Region: Østlandet
- County: Akershus
- Municipality: Aurskog-Høland
- Time zone: UTC+01:00 (CET)
  - Summer (DST): UTC+02:00 (CEST)

Dalsroa is a village in Aurskog-Høland, Akershus, Norway.
