= Slattumhagen =

- Village
- Location in Akershus
- Coordinates: 60°10′15″N 10°59′03″E
- Country: Norway
- Region: Østlandet
- County: Akershus
- Municipality: Nannestad
- Time zone: UTC+01:00 (CET)
  - Summer (DST): UTC+02:00 (CEST)

Slattumhagen is a village in Nannestad, Akershus, Norway.
