= Vøyenenga =

- Village
- Location in Akershus Vøyenenga (Norway)
- Coordinates: 59°54′31″N 10°28′29″E
- Country: Norway
- Region: Østlandet
- County: Akershus
- Municipality: Bærum
- Time zone: UTC+01:00 (CET)
  - Summer (DST): UTC+02:00 (CEST)

Vøyenenga is a village in Bærum, Akershus, Norway.
