= Bjørnemyr =

- Village
- Location in Akershus
- Coordinates: 59°50′N 10°38′E
- Country: Norway
- Region: Østlandet
- County: Akershus
- Municipality: Nesodden
- Time zone: UTC+01:00 (CET)
  - Summer (DST): UTC+02:00 (CEST)

Bjørnemyr is a Norwegian village located on the west coast of the municipality of Nesodden. The Bjørnemyr Centre contains a grocery store, a hairdresser and spa, and a doctor's office. Recently a small mall was built not far from the Bjørnemyr Centre, which included a grocery store, a small café, a health store, and cutlery. The Sunnaas Hospital lies near Bjørnemyr. Bjørnemyr has an elementary school and a kindergarten situated right next to each other. Bjørnemyr Elementary School has a section for both physically and mentally challenged children.
