= Solemskogen =

- Village
- Location in Oslo
- Coordinates: 59°58′44″N 10°48′48″E
- Country: Norway
- Region: Østlandet
- County: Oslo
- Municipality: Oslo
- Time zone: UTC+01:00 (CET)
  - Summer (DST): UTC+02:00 (CEST)

Solemskogen is a village to the north of Oslo, Norway.
