= Buras (surname) =

Buras or Burås is a surname. Notable people with the surname include:

- Andrzej Buras (born 1946), Polish physicist
- Robert Burås (1975–2007), Norwegian musician
- Krzysztof Buras (born 1980), Polish bridge player
