= Momoen =

- Village
- Location in Akershus
- Coordinates: 59°48′19″N 11°23′53″E
- Country: Norway
- Region: Østlandet
- County: Akershus
- Municipality: Aurskog-Høland
- Time zone: UTC+01:00 (CET)
  - Summer (DST): UTC+02:00 (CEST)

Momoen is a village in the municipality of Aurskog-Høland, Norway. Its population (2005) is 349. Momoen is about 55 km away from Oslo.
