= Coat of arms of Akershus =

Norwegian county coat of arms

The coat of arms of Akershus was approved by Royal Resolution on 11 December 1987 and was designed by Finn Fagerli. The arms is a silver step-gable on a blue field and is a reference to Akershus Castle where several of the buildings feature such gables. The castle was the seat of the governor of Akershus amt, the predecessor of today's county.

== Blason ==
- Norwegian: I blått en sølv trappegavl
