= Torget, Nesodden =

Torget
- Village
- Location within Akershus Location within Norway
- Coordinates: 59°48′33″N 10°41′27″E
- Country: Norway
- Region: Østlandet
- County: Akershus
- Municipality: Nesodden
- Time zone: UTC+01:00 (CET)
  - Summer (DST): UTC+02:00 (CEST)

Torget is a village in Nesodden, Akershus, Norway.
