= Løken =

- Village
- Location in Akershus
- Coordinates: 59°47′48″N 11°27′43″E
- Country: Norway
- Region: Østlandet
- County: Akershus
- Municipality: Aurskog-Høland

Population
  - Total: 1,539
- Time zone: UTC+01:00 (CET)
  - Summer (DST): UTC+02:00 (CEST)

Løken is a village in the municipality of Aurskog-Høland, Norway. Its population is 1,539.
