= Borgen, Asker =

Coordinates: 59°49′16″N 10°25′22″E

Borgen
- Suburb of Asker County
- Location in Akershus
- Country: Norway
- Region: Østlandet
- County: Akershus
- Time zone: UTC+01:00 (CET)
  - Summer (DST): UTC+02:00 (CEST)

Borgen is a suburb located in the municipality of Asker, Norway. Located some 20 kilometers southwest of Oslo, Borgen has many different styles of residential areas, ranging from apartment complexes and semi-detached houses in the southern area of Borgen, to the villas of Borgen Skog.

There are two elementary schools, Rønningen Barneskole and Hagaløkka Barneskole, and a middle school, Borgen Ungdomsskole.

Mount Vardåsen offers downhill skiing in winter and during the rest of the terrain is used for Orienteering.
