= Ursvik =

- Village
- Location in Akershus
- Coordinates: 59°51′03″N 10°40′40″E
- Country: Norway
- Region: Østlandet
- County: Akershus
- Time zone: UTC+01:00 (CET)
  - Summer (DST): UTC+02:00 (CEST)

Ursvik is a village in Nesodden, Akershus, Norway.
