= Minnesund =

- Village
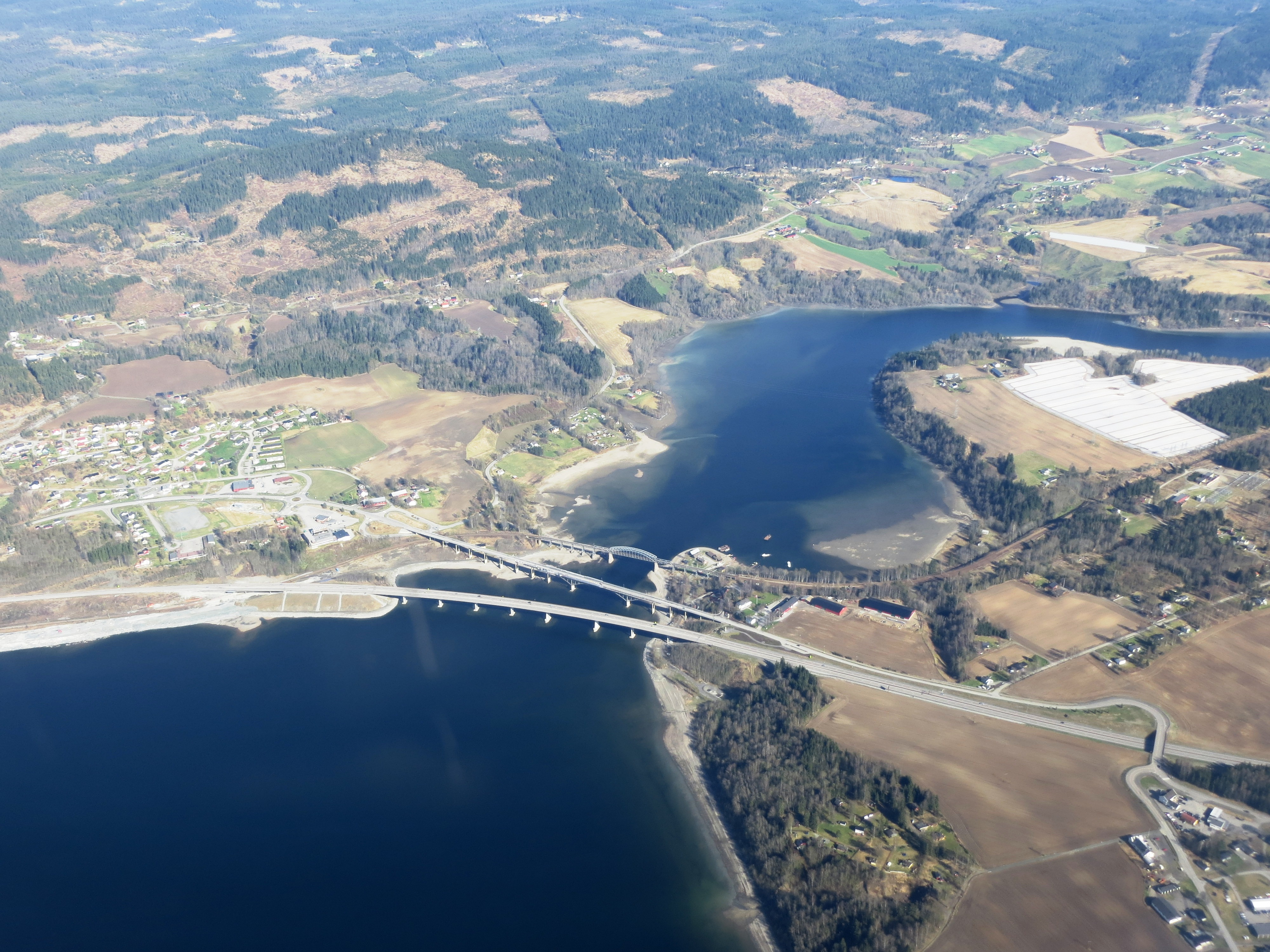

- Location in Akershus
- Coordinates: 60°23′N 11°14′E
- Country: Norway
- Region: Østlandet
- County: Akershus
- District: Eidsvoll
- Time zone: UTC+01:00 (CET)
  - Summer (DST): UTC+02:00 (CEST)

Minnesund is a village in the municipality of Eidsvoll, Norway. It is located at the southern end of lake Mjøsa. As of 2005, its population is 488.
