= Follo, Norway =

Follo
- District
- Map of Follo with municipalities

- Location within Akershus Location within Norway
- Coordinates: 59°43′13″N 10°50′19″E
- Country: Norway
- County: Akershus
- Region: Austlandet
- Website: follo.no/om-folloregionen

Follo (old spelling Foldouge) is one of three traditional and judicional districts in the former fylke (county) of Akershus, Norway - south east of Oslo towards the county of Østfold, the other two regions being Romerike (east of Oslo following european route E6 going east and then north in Norway) and Asker og Bærum (west of Oslo). Follo borders Oslo to the North-West, fellow Akershus district Romerike to the North-East and East, and Østfold to the south.

Follo region, within Akershus county, is situated south and south east of Oslo. The municipalities labeled 5, 7, 13, 15, 18, 21, and 22 make up Follo.

Frogn Municipality and Vestby Municipality have coast lines along the Oslofjord. Ås Municipality and Nordre Follo Municipality have coast lines along the Bunnefjord (a part of the Oslofjord that extends south-east), and Nesodden Municipality has coast lines along both fjords. Follo covers around 819 square kilometres (316 sq mi), and had a population of 121,368 on October 1, 2007. (In 2020, the old Oppegård Municipality and Ski Municipality were merged to form Nordre Follo Municipality.)

As with other traditional districts in Norway, Follo has no official political or administrative significance - the regional administrative entity is the fylke, while the local administrative entities are the kommuner (municipalities). It does, however, have judicional significance, as a local police and court district. It also has practical significance, as the municipalities within the district tend to cooperate for practical and economical purposes.

The largest town, and de facto district capital, is Ski. This is where judicial functions such as the old Follo District Court and the old Follo Police District were located, and where the cooperating municipalities tend to concentrate administrative functions and public services.

All municipalities in Follo are within an hour's drive from Oslo, and large parts of the workforce actually work in Oslo. Apart from the long coastline, Follo has extensive woods and farmland, and only little industry. Most parts of Follo are well suited for outdoor activities, and many athletes have come from this district – such as Trine Hattestad (javelin), Jon Rønningen (wrestling), and Siren Sundby (sailing).

== Etymology ==
The Old Norse form of the name was Folló (from Foldló). The first element is the old name of Oslofjord (see Østfold and Vestfold), the last element is ló which means 'meadow' (see also Lom Municipality and Oslo Municipality).

== Politics ==
After the local elections in 2015 five of the municipalities (Ski, Ås, Enebakk, Nesodden and Vestby) have a mayor from the Labour Party, while two (Oppegård and Frogn) have a mayor from the Conservative Party
