= Hurdal =

Hurdal Municipality Hurdal kommune
- Municipality
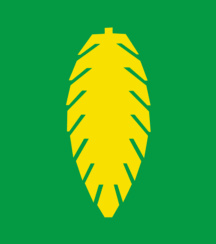
- Flag Coat of arms

- Akershus within Norway

- Hurdal within Akershus
- Coordinates: 60°24′57″N 11°0′31″E
- Country: Norway
- County: Akershus
- District: Romerike
- Administrative centre: Hurdal

Government
  - Mayor (2013): Runar Bålsrud (V)

Area
  - Total: 285 km^{2} (110 sq mi)
  - Land: 261 km^{2} (101 sq mi)
  - Rank: #284 in Norway

Population (2004)
  - Total: 2,679
  - Rank: #292 in Norway
  - Density: 10/km^{2} (26/sq mi)
  - Change (10 years): ▲ +5.4%
- Demonym(s): Hurdaling or Hurdøling

Official language
  - Norwegian form: Bokmål
- Time zone: UTC+01:00 (CET)
  - Summer (DST): UTC+02:00 (CEST)
- ISO 3166 code: NO-3242
- Website: Official website

Hurdal is a municipality in Akershus county, Norway. It is part of the traditional region of Romerike. The administrative centre of the municipality is the village of Hurdal.

Hurdal is located about 70 kilometres (40 mi) north of Oslo, along the lake Hurdalsjøen. Fjellsjøkampen is the highest hill in Akershus.

== General information ==
=== Name ===
The name (Old Norse: Urðardalr and Hurðardalr) is an old district name. (The name of the church site is Gjøing.) The first element is the genitive case of an old river name (later called Gjøingelva which means "Gjøing river"), probably Urð which means "stony river" (from urð which means "scree"). (The sideform Hurðardalr has an addition of a false /h/.) The last element is dalr meaning "valley" or "dale". Prior to 1918, the name was spelled "Hurdalen".

=== Coat-of-arms ===
The coat-of-arms is from modern times. They were granted in 1988. The arms are green with a yellow-colored cone from a Norway Spruce tree (Picea abies).

Number of minorities (1st and 2nd generation) in Hurdal by country of origin in 2017
Ancestry	Number
Germany	28
Sweden	27
Poland	27

== History ==
The parish of Hurdalen was established as a municipality on 1 January 1838 (see formannskapsdistrikt). The new municipality of Feiring was separated from Hurdal on 1 January 1870.

== Attractions ==
- Holy Trifon Skete, an Eastern Orthodox monastery of Orthodox church in Norway (Saint Nicolas commune). The monastery was established in 1985.

== Notable residents ==
- Børre Rognlien (born 1944 in Hurdal) a sports official and politician, former journalist and military officer
- Harald Sunde (born 1954 in Hurdal) a military officer, head of the Norwegian Armed Forces 2009 to 2013
- Robert Sørlie (born 1958 in Hurdal) - dog sled racer, winner of Iditarod Trail Sled Dog Race in 2003 and 2005
- Kjetil Mulelid (born 1991 in Hurdal) a Norwegian jazz pianist and composer

== Gallery ==
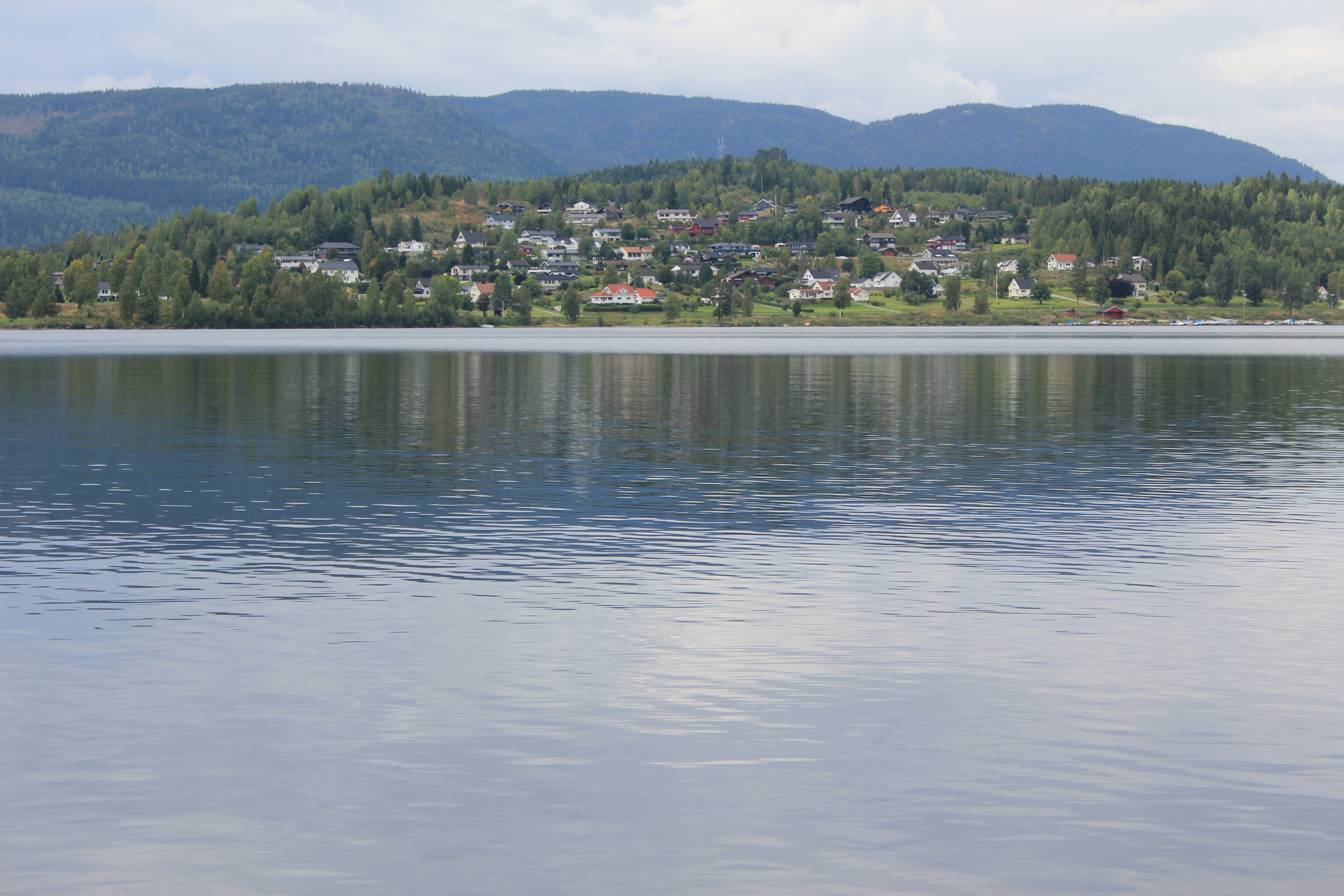
Suburbant boligfelt i Hurdal

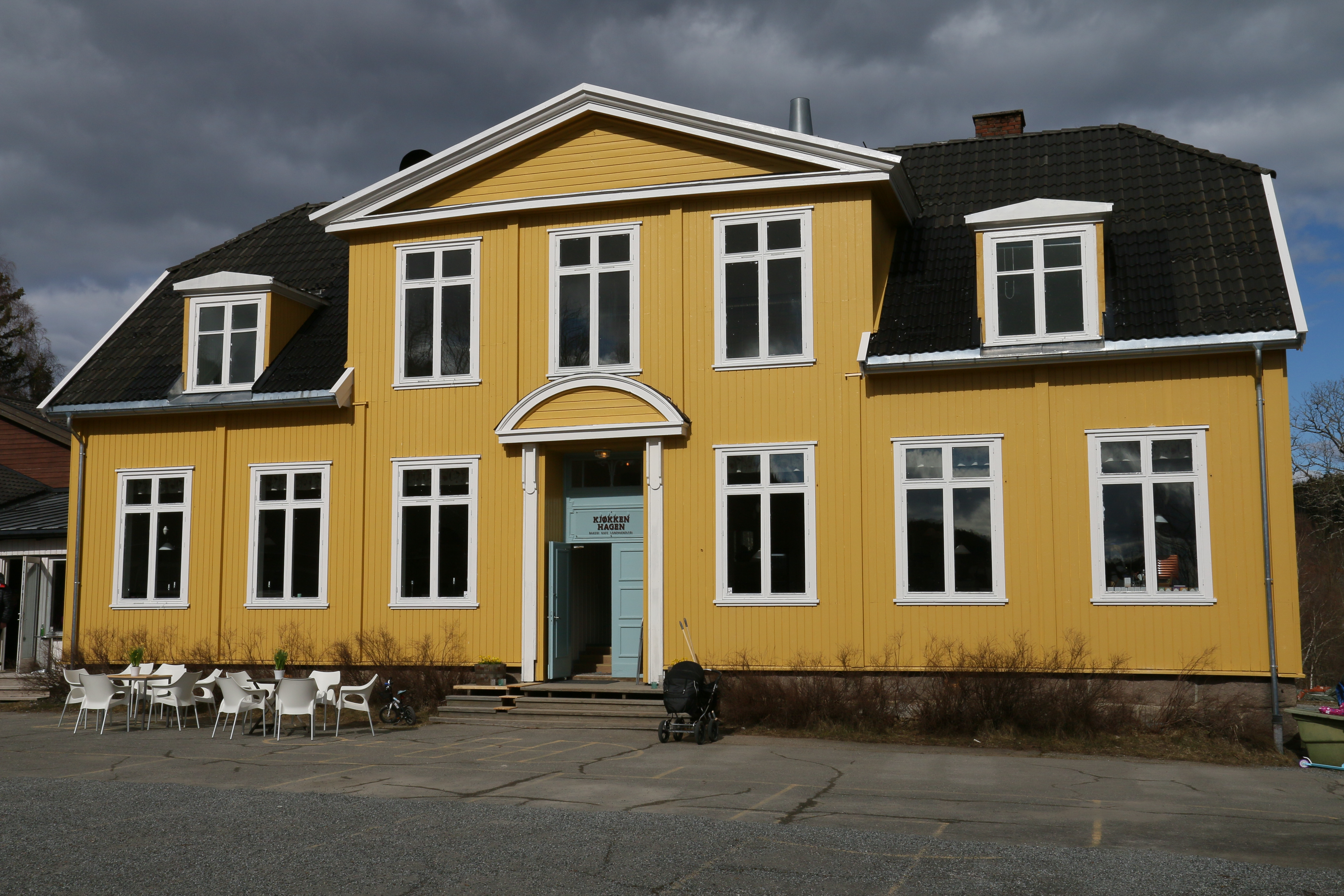
Kirkekretsen skole i Hurdal, kafè

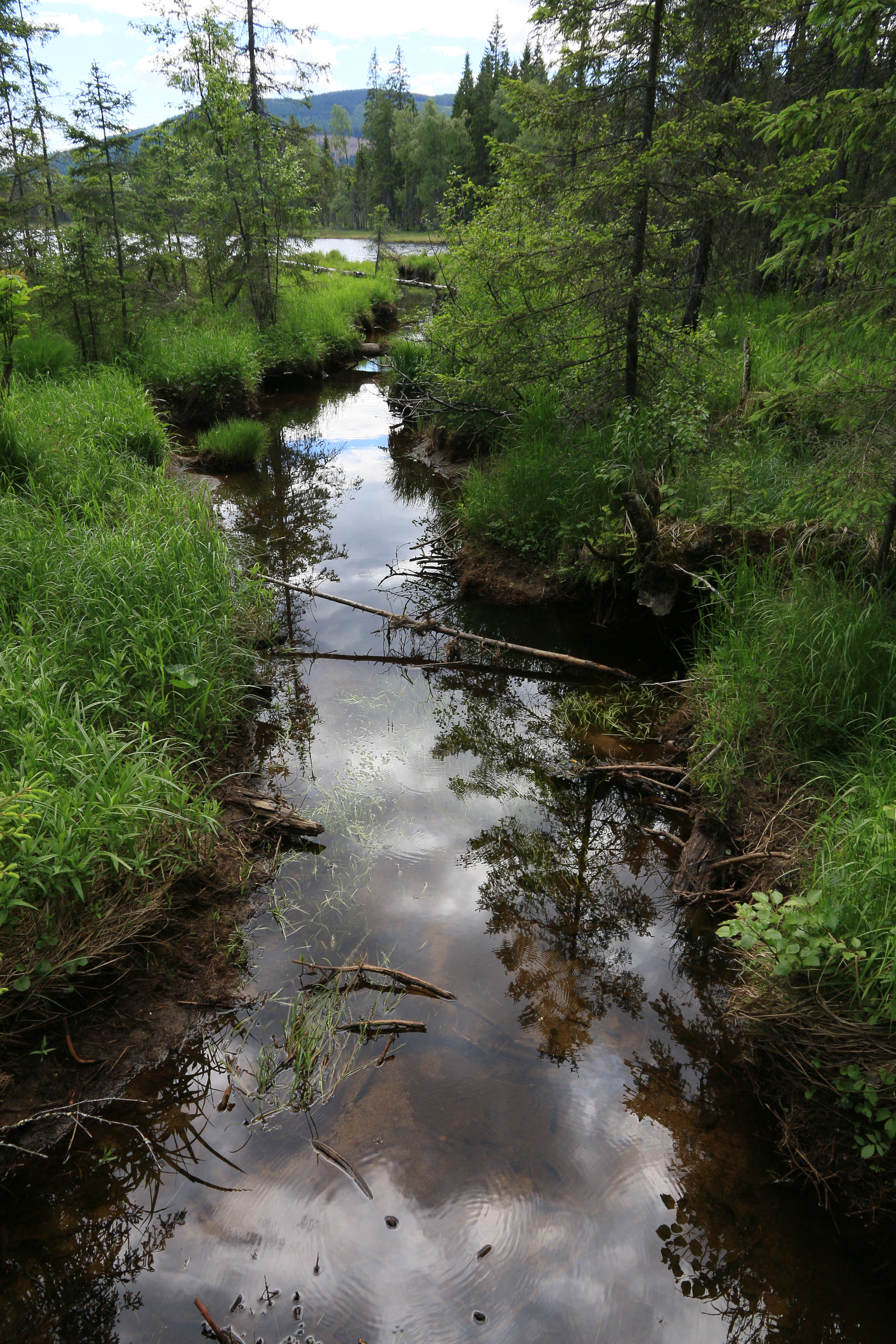
Naturstien ved Buråstjernet i Hurdal

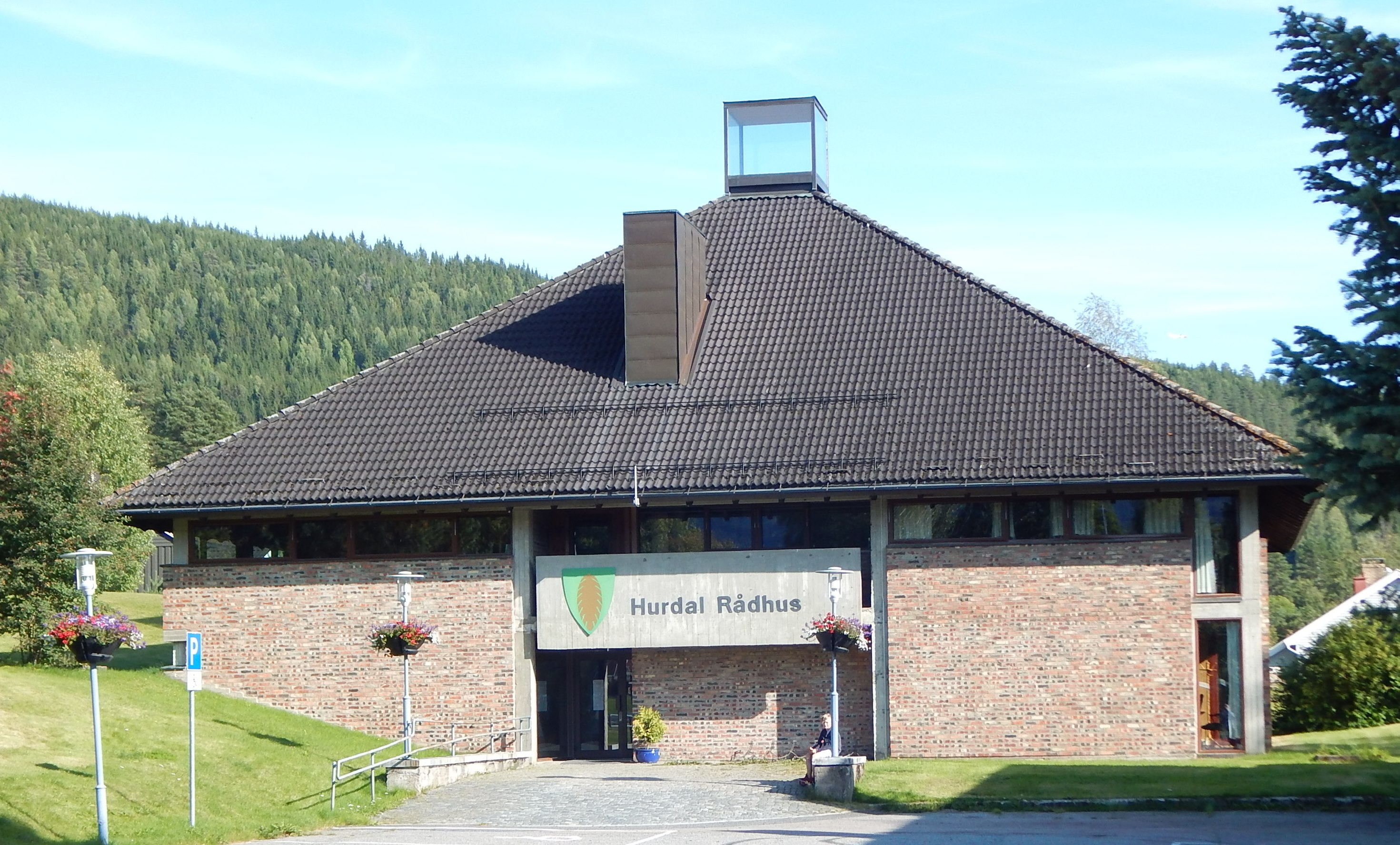
Hurdal rådhus
Øvre Romerike fra Mistberget
