= Herrestad =

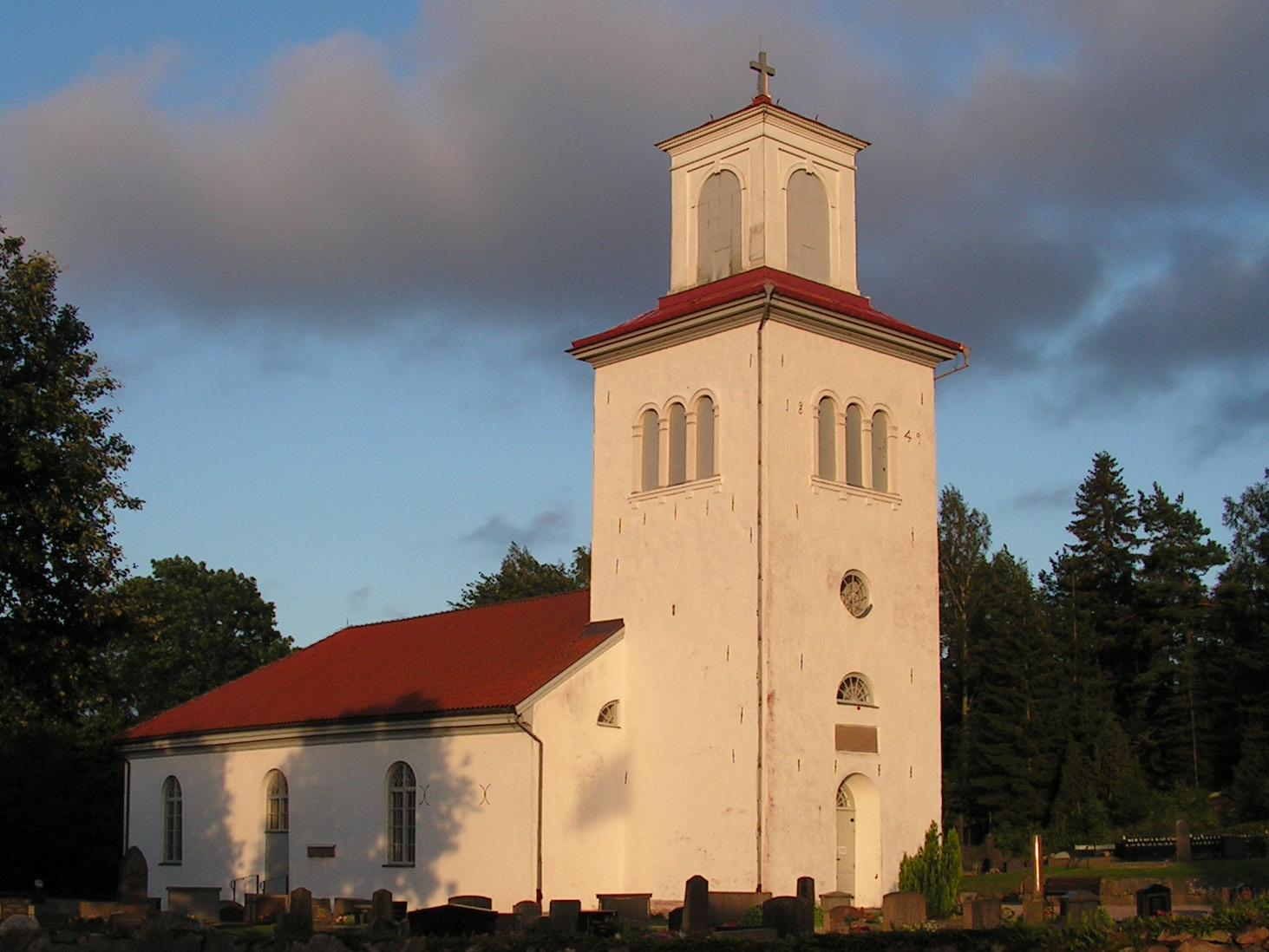
- Herrestad church

- Location within Västra Götaland Location within Sweden
- Coordinates: 58°21′N 11°51′E
- Country: Sweden
- Province: Bohuslän
- County: Västra Götaland County
- Municipality: Uddevalla Municipality

Area
  - Total: 1.99 km^{2} (0.77 sq mi)

Population (31 December 2010)
  - Total: 2,583
  - Density: 1,296/km^{2} (3,360/sq mi)
- Time zone: UTC+1 (CET)
  - Summer (DST): UTC+2 (CEST)

Herrestad is a former locality situated in Uddevalla Municipality, Västra Götaland County, Sweden that became a neighbourhood of Uddevalla in 2015. It had 3 267 inhabitants in 2022. Herrestad is located 5 kilometers west of central Uddevalla, with Byfjorden to the south and Herrestadsfjället to the north. Torp Köpcentrum is located right next to Herrestad.

The neighbourhood’s church, Herrestads Kyrka, stands halfway up a hill. It was originally built in the 12:th century, but had some drastic changes made in 1849. The church’s white tower is a major landmark in the area.

Herrestad grave field is located to the west of Herrestad, right next to the European route E6. Here, a total of 110 graves have been found. Most of these are from the iron and viking ages, while a few are from the bronze age.

== Neighbourhoods ==
Since Herrestad was previously a separate locality from Uddevalla, it had its own neighbourhoods. Now that Herrestad itself is a neighbourhood, these are now technically neighbourhoods inside neighbourhoods.

- Fröland
- Kissleberg
- Källdal
- Misteröd
- Sunningen

== Transportation ==
=== Major Roads ===
- The national road 44 runs through northern Herrestad, connecting the neighbourhood with central Uddevalla, as well as Trollhättan and Götene.
- The European route E6 has two intersections just outside Herrestad at Torp Köpcentrum.
- The county road 161 starts at Torp Köpcentrum and ends in Lysekil.

=== Bus ===
There are many bus lines running on road 44 as it is the fastest route between central Uddevalla and Torp Köpcentrum. Most of these lines stop at multiple stops in Herrestad, allowing for quick transfer to central Uddevalla.

City bus lines 2, 4 and 6 stop at various stops in Herrestad, allowing for direct connection from the neighbourhood to Torp Köpcentrum, Uddevalla Central Station, Kampenhof Resecentrum, Uddevalla Hospital and Uddevalla Gymnasieskola.

Herrestad also has direct connection to Trollhättan, Kungshamn, Smögen, Orust, Tjörn and Stenungsund as well as multiple localities along the E6 between Uddevalla and Strömstad.
