= Ammenäs =

- Location within Västra Götaland Location within Sweden
- Coordinates: 58°19′N 11°50′E
- Country: Sweden
- Province: Bohuslän
- County: Västra Götaland County
- Municipality: Uddevalla Municipality

Area
  - Total: 1.51 km^{2} (0.58 sq mi)

Population (2023)
  - Total: 617
  - Density: 409/km^{2} (1,060/sq mi)
- Time zone: UTC+1 (CET)
  - Summer (DST): UTC+2 (CEST)

Ammenäs is a locality situated in Uddevalla Municipality, Västra Götaland County, Sweden with 617 inhabitants in 2023. It is located where Byfjorden connects with Havstensfjorden, 7 kilometers southwest of central Uddevalla as the crow flies.

There is no school in or near Ammenäs, however, the plans for a new school are in development. Skäretskolan, as it will be called, is planned to open in 2028 which will shorten the travel distance for 6-12 year old students in Ammenäs, Sundstrand and a lot of rural localities in the area.

Despite Ammenäs’s location near the south abutment of the Uddevalla Bridge, it has no direct connection to the European route E6. Instead, inhabitants have to drive 3 km south to reach the closest interchange. There are 2 bus stops just outside Ammenäs from where one of the two lines between Ljungskile and Uddevalla stop. There are also 3 locations in Ammenäs where ferries stop during the summer season, offering connection to Uddevalla, Gustafsberg, Lindesnäs, Sunningen, Unda and Hafsten.
