= Hølen Viaduct =

Disused iron railway bridge in Norway

Hølen Viaduct Hølen viadukt
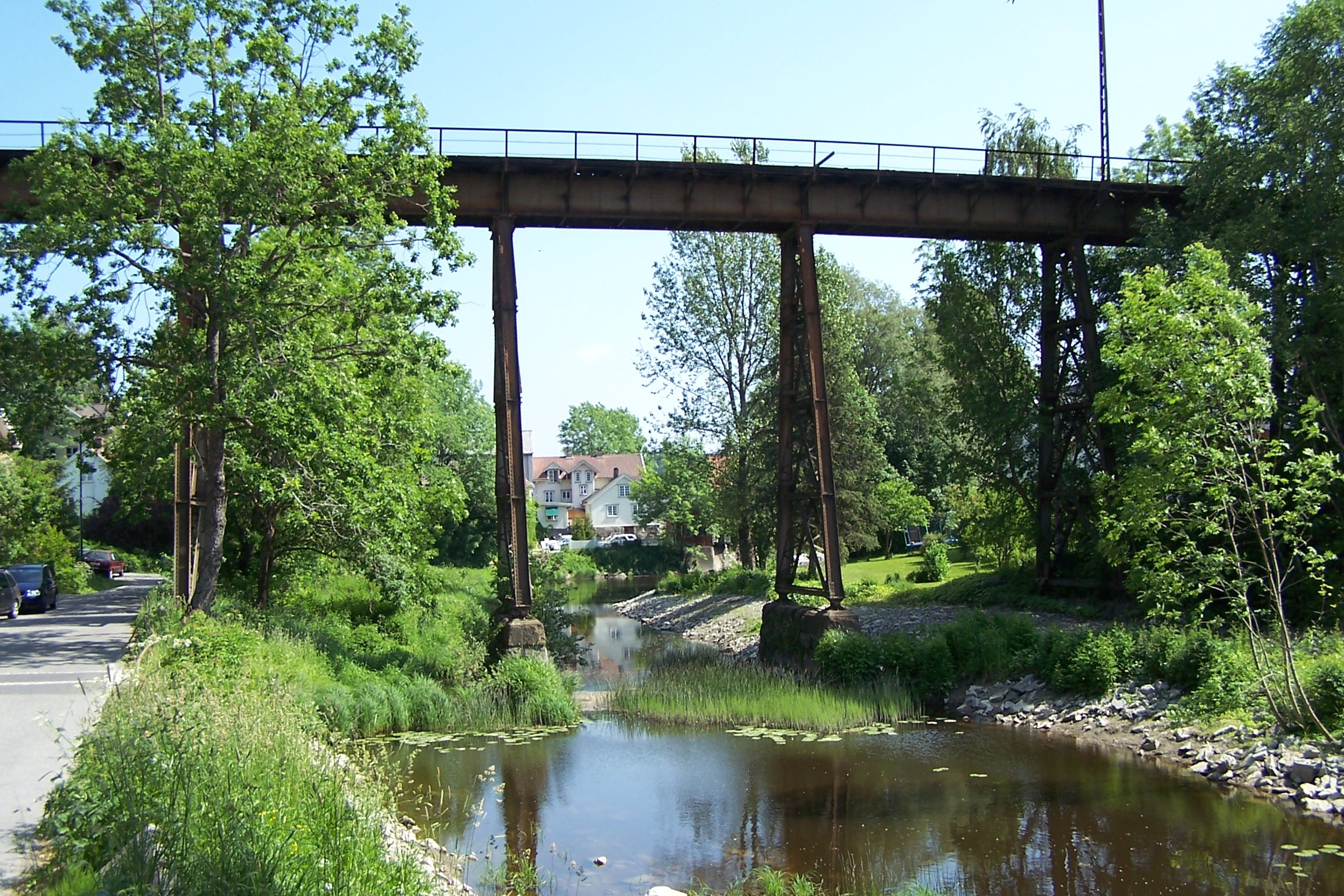
- Coordinates: 59.539°N 10.740°E
- Carries: Østfold Line
- Crosses: Såna
- Locale: Hølen, Vestby, Norway

Characteristics
- Material: Iron
- Total length: 130.6 m (428 ft)
- Longest span: 9.4 m (31 ft)
- No. of spans: 14

History
- Designer: Axel Petersson
- Opened: 2 January 1879
- Closed: 21 September 1996
- Replaced by: Hølendalen Bridge

Location
- Interactive map of Hølen Viaduct

The Hølen Viaduct (Norwegian: Hølen viadukt) is a disused iron railway viaduct situated at Hølen in Akershus county, Norway. The iron carried a single track of the Østfold Line over the river Såna and the valley where the village of Hølen is located. The viaduct was the first pendulum pillar bridge in the world, and was designed by the principle's inventor, Axel Jacob Petersson. It is 130.6 meters (428 ft) long.

The viaduct was built as part of the Østfold Line and opened on 2 January 1879. It was structurally strengthened through a pillar replacement program in 1914. From 1931 Hobøl Station was situated on its north end. A new section of Østfold Line opened on 21 September 1996, resulting in the viaduct and the old line being closed. Hølen Viaduct is still standing, but not in use.

== Specifications ==
The Hølen Viaduct is an iron pendulum pillar bridge which crosses Såna. It is 130.6 meters (428 ft) long and consists of fourteen spans supported by thirteen pillars. Two spans measure 8.9 meters (29 ft), while twelve measure 9.4 meters (31 ft). The bridge carried the single-tracked Østfold Line's and was situated 46.90 kilometers (29.14 mi) from Oslo Central Station. The entire viaduct was built on a curve with a curve radius of 470 meters (1,540 ft).

== History ==
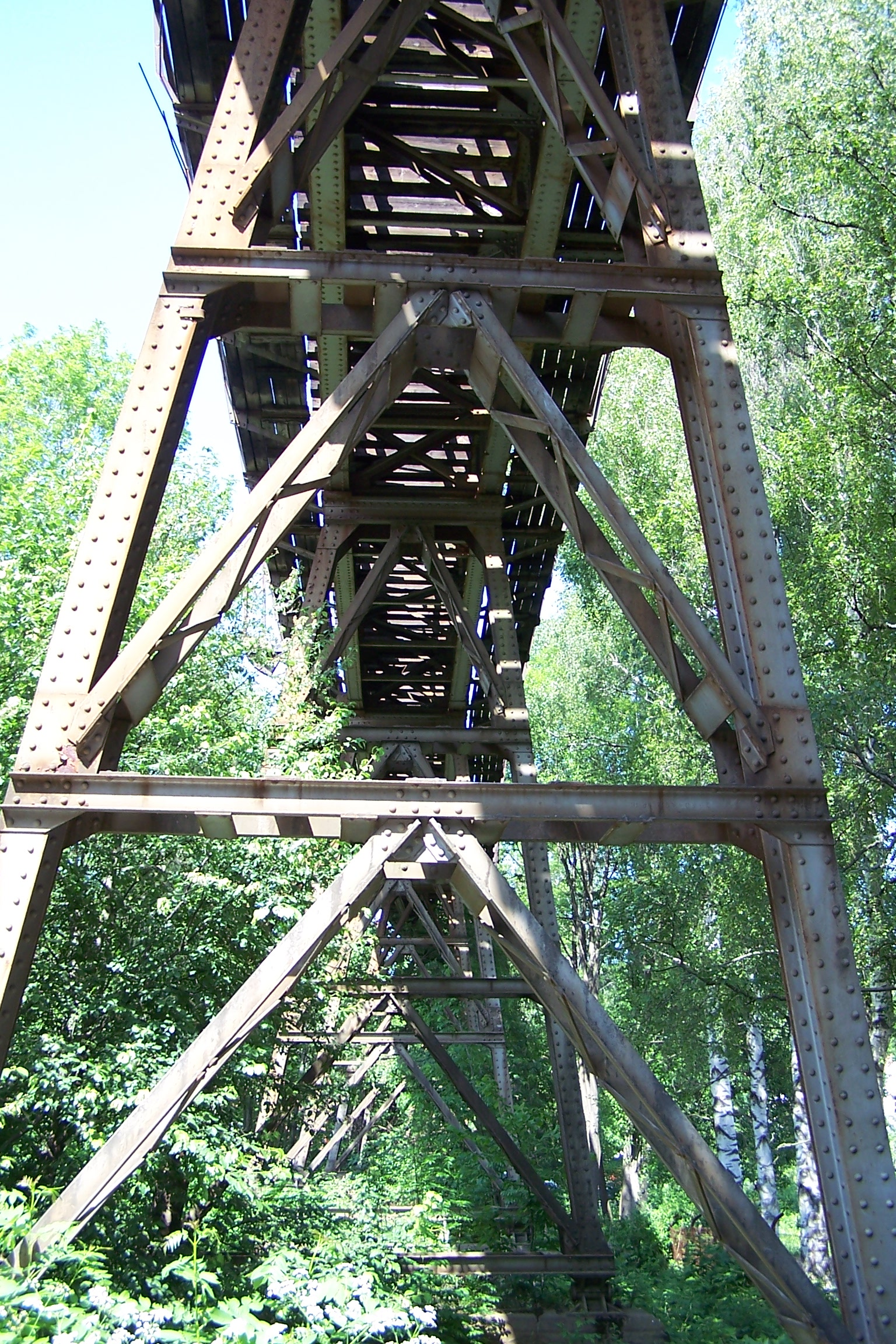
The viaduct seen from below

The Østfold Line was the first railway in Norway to use iron as the main construction material for its bridges. This allowed the line to be built with several larger viaducts, the most prominent being the Ljan Viaduct. The design was placed under the construction- and bridgeoffice, which was led by Axel Jacob Petersson. During the design process, he devised the pendulum pillar principle. This method allowed for smaller pillars which could be prefabricated and then mounted easily at the site, reducing costs significantly. The lower costs allowed for several viaducts to be built, which again allowed for less gradients, as embankments would be prohibitively expensive.

Petersson first designed the Ljan Viaduct and the Sarpsfossen Bridge, neither which used the pendulum pillar process as these were too far into the design process when he reached his breakthrough. Instead it was the later Hølen and Rolfsøsund Viaducts which were designed with it. The Hølen Viaduct is the first structure in the world to be built with the principle. The Østfold Line opened on 2 January 1879.

By the turn of the century it was becoming increasingly clear that higher train weights were needed on the Østfold Line. It was the main route south of the capital towards Continental Europe and had several heavy freight and fast passenger trains. The Norwegian State Railways determined that the line should, along with the Ofoten Line, have the highest weight dimensions on the network. A decision to strengthen all bridges was taken in 1910. The breakout of the First World War caused a delay of the plan at large, although the Hølen Viaduct was prioritized and strengthened in 1914. Because of the pendulum design, a mobile scaffolding was erected and allowed each pillar to be replaced in turn. This was much simpler than many of the other bridges on the line.

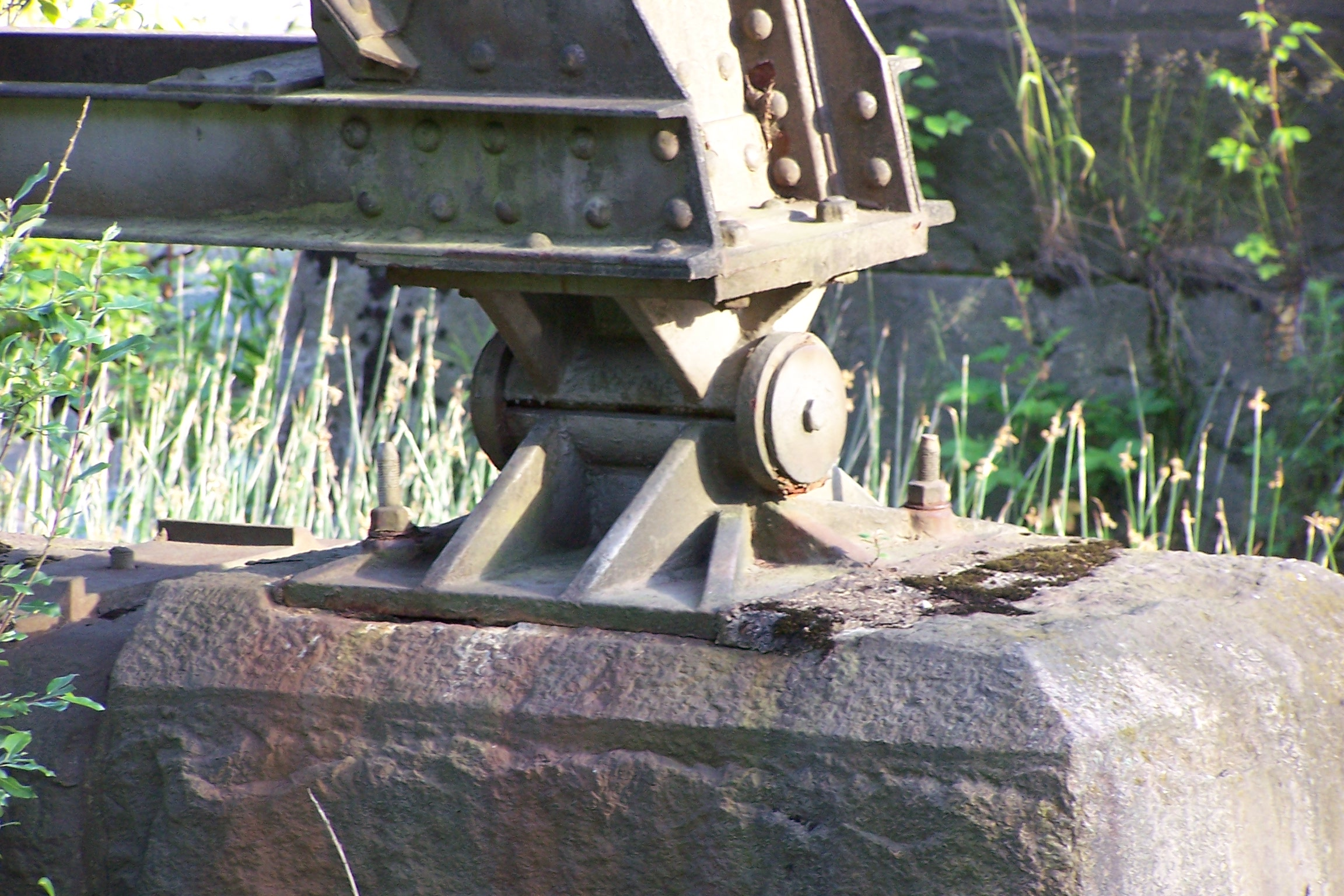
The fastening of the pillar which allows its pendular motion

Hølen Station was established as a flag stop 170 meters (560 ft) north of the viaduct. It opened on 1931 and was in use until the section of line was closed. The bridge was electrified on 1 September 1930.

During the 1980s NSB started working on plans rebuild the Østfold Line between Ski Station and Moss Station. Originally the idea was to simply place a second track next to the first. But it soon became evident that the railway would be better served if a new route was selected, which allowed for higher speeds. Originally Kjenn Station north of Hobøl was proposed as the end of the double track, but NSB extended their plans. A new route was proposed between Rustad Station and Sonsveien Station which would place the line further west, avoiding the village of Hobøl. It would also allow the line to be built next to European Road E6. Construction was approved in 1989. A major part structure on the segment past Hølen was Hølendalen Bridge, a concrete structure which replaces the original viaduct.

With the new route the former line became disused. There was a discussion of what the line was to be used for. It was ultimately decided that the bridge would be kept as a cultural heritage. There were proposals to use the bridge as part of a bicycle path, which was opened June 2021.

== Bibliography ==
- Bjerke, Thor; Holom, Finn (2004). Banedata 2004 (in Norwegian). Hamar / Oslo: Norwegian Railway Museum / Norwegian Railway Club. ISBN 82-90286-28-7.
- Langård, Geir-Widar; Ruud, Leif-Harald (2005). Sydbaneracer og Skandiapil – Glimt fra Østfoldbanen gjennom 125 år (in Norwegian). Oslo: Norwegian Railway Club. ISBN 978-82-90286-29-8.
- Taugbøl, Trond (1998). Hølen – stedet med bruene (in Norwegian). Vestby Municipality.
