= Hølendalen Bridges =

Hølendalen Bridge Hølendalen bru
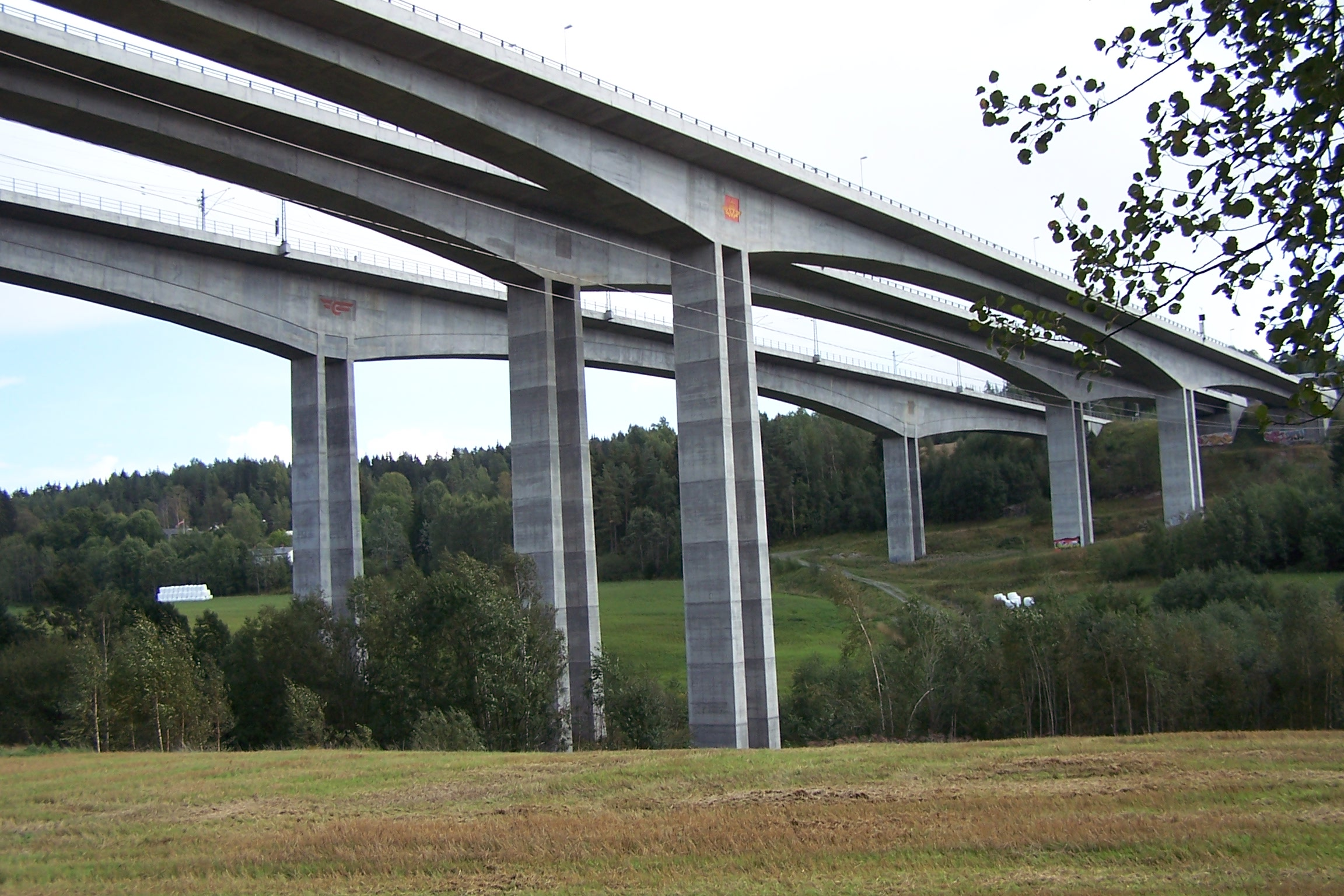
- Coordinates: 59.537°N 10.727°E
- Carries: Østfold Line; European Road E6
- Crosses: Hølendalen, Såna
- Locale: Hølen, Vestby, Norway
- Owner: Bane NOR; Norwegian Public Roads Administration

Characteristics
- Design: Cantilever
- Material: Concrete
- Total length: 416 m (1,365 ft)
- Height: 50 m (160 ft)
- Longest span: 128 m (420 ft)
- No. of spans: 4

History
- Architect: Lunde og Løvset
- Engineering design by: Johs Holt
- Constructed by: Skanska
- Construction cost: 174 million kr
- Opened: 21 September 1996
- Replaces: Hølen Viaduct

The Hølendalen Bridges (Norwegian: Hølendalen broer) are three parallel concrete cantilever bridge which cross Hølendalen in Vestby, Norway. One carries two tracks of the Østfold Line, the other two carry four lanes of European Road E6. The bridges have four spans, the two in center at 128 meters (420 ft) and the two outer at 80 meters (260 ft). The overall lengths are 416 meters (1,365 ft). The bridges are up to 50 meters (160 ft) above the valley and the creek of Såna.

Proposals for bridges were first made in 1988, as part of a joint planning of a new high-speed railway and freeway through Vestby. Johs Holt were the structural engineers and Lunde og Løvset architects. The railway bridge was built first and opened on 21 September 1996. The freeway bridges followed afterwards. They have won among other awards Betongtavlen in 1999.

== Specifications ==
There are three bridges which cross Hølendalen. The easternmost carries two tracks of the Østfold Line. Its northern end is situated 46.02 kilometers (28.60 mi) from Oslo Central Station. The line is electrified and is dimensioned for speeds up to 200 km/h (120 mph). The two western bridges carry a combined four freeway lanes of European Road E6. At the southern end both the railway and freeway enter respective tunnels. This is the 910-meter (2,990 ft) Stavengåsen Tunnel for the railway and the twin-tubed Follo Tunnel for the freeway.

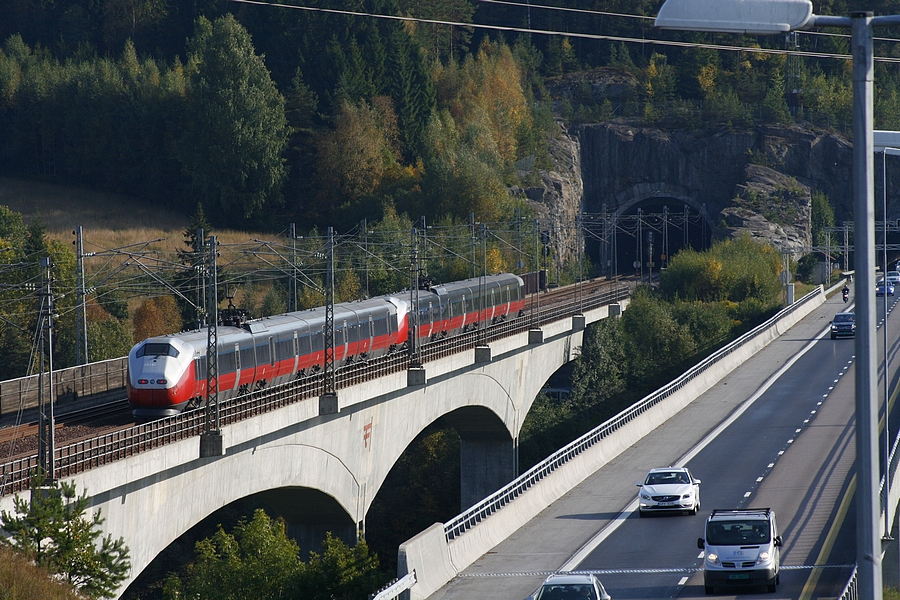
NSB Class 73 train on the railway bridge, looking southwards to the Stavengåsen Tunnel

The three concrete cantilever bridges have the same span and length dimensions, with pillars located at the same relative points. This allows for a cleaner visual appearance. The overall length is 416 meters (1,365 ft). The two central spans each measure 128 meters (420 ft), while the inner spans measure 80 meters (260 ft). At the highest the bridges are 50 meters (160 ft) above the valley floor. Each span was anchored at each end in a twin concrete pillar. These were 4.47 meters (14.7 ft) wide. The depth started at 1.8 meters (5 ft 11 in) at the foot and decreased to a minimum of 1.0 meter (3 ft 3 in) on the tallest pillars. There is a 3.0-meter (9.8 ft) gap between the twin pillars. All pillars are fastened into bedrock through a deep foundation. For the middle pillars with involved piling down up to 28 meters (92 ft).

The dimensions of the decks vary between the railway and road bridge. The former must tolerate a breaking force of 6 meganewtons (MN) at the same time as another train accelerates at 1 MN. For the road bridge the demand was only 750 kN. The railway bridge therefore has a deck depth of between 8.7 and 4.3 meters (29 and 14 ft), while the corresponding values for the road bridges are 6.5 and 2.1 meters (21.3 and 6.9 ft). In addition there is a further 0.7 meters (2 ft 4 in) on the railway bridge for the ballast. The railway is standard gauge and electrified at 15 kV 16.7 Hz AC. Each of the road bridges has an overall width of 12.1 meters (40 ft).

== History ==
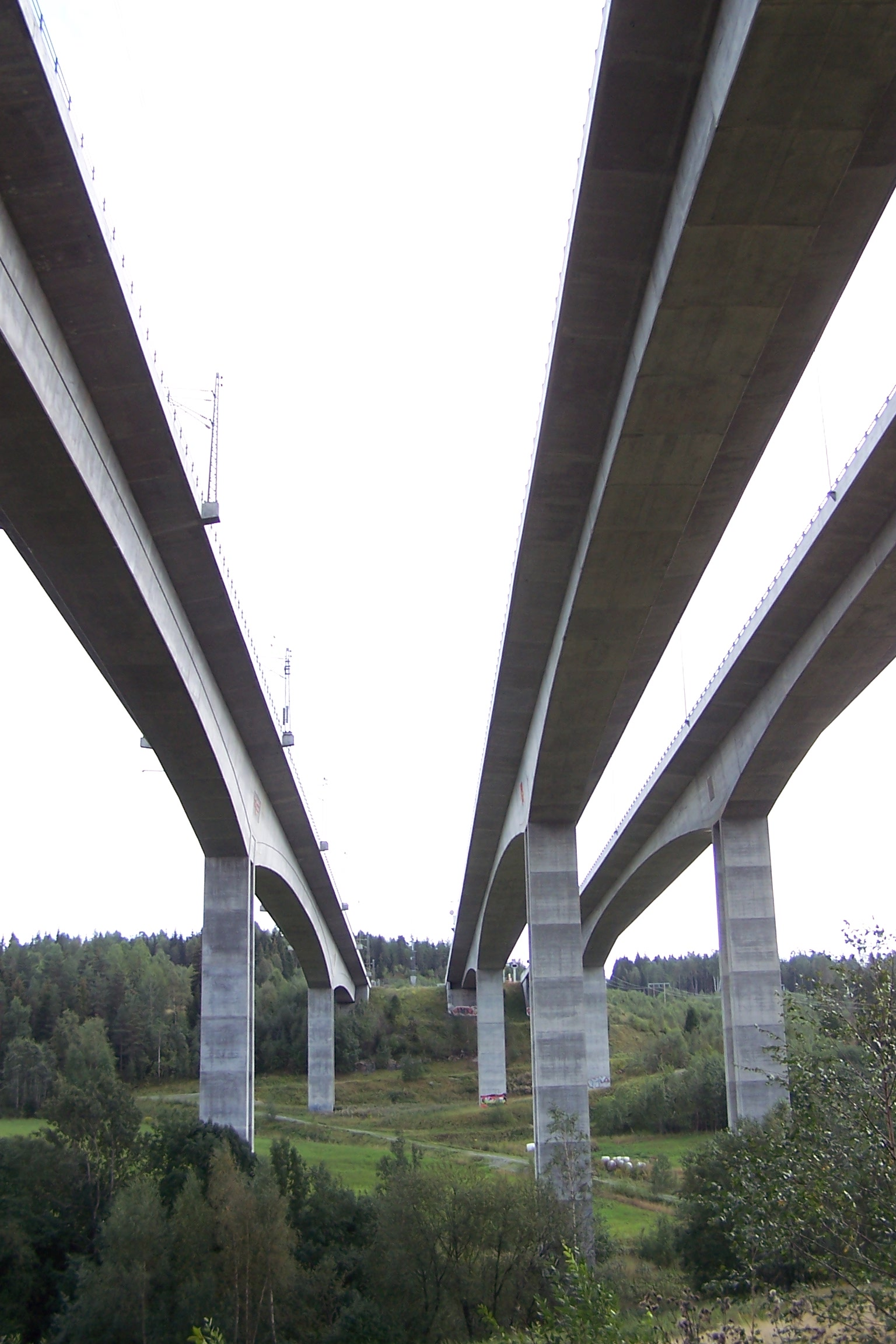
The bridges from below

The Norwegian State Railways identified the Østfold Line between Ski Station and Moss Station as one of its prime bottlenecks in the 1940s. Proposals of rebuilding to double track were initially rejected by Parliament in 1950. The plans resurfaced in 1985, this time as a proposed section of double track from Tveter Station via Vestby Station to Kjenn Station. As NSB worked on the plans, it became increasingly clear that a small section of double track would not be sufficient, and that the whole section from Ski to Moss would need to be rebuilt. NSB initiated planning of the whole segment in 1988.

Planning of a new E6 through Vestby started in 1988. This planning was tied to that of the railway, which would allow the freeway and railway to run in parallel from just south of Vestby Station to past Sonsveien Station. NSB changed their original plans and cut the initial double tracking short at Rustad Station so that the section south of Rustad could be moved and planned along with the freeway. This also reflected the mentality change which took place during the railway planning. It was initially only thought of as a capacity increase, but soon NSB also wanted to increase the speed of the line. As planning progressed, the dimensioned speed increased from 130 km/h (81 mph) via 160 km/h (99 mph) to 200 km/h (120 mph). By the time the latter speed was approved, only the section between Rustad and Smørbekk, including the Hølendalen Bridge, was dimensioned for the latter speed.

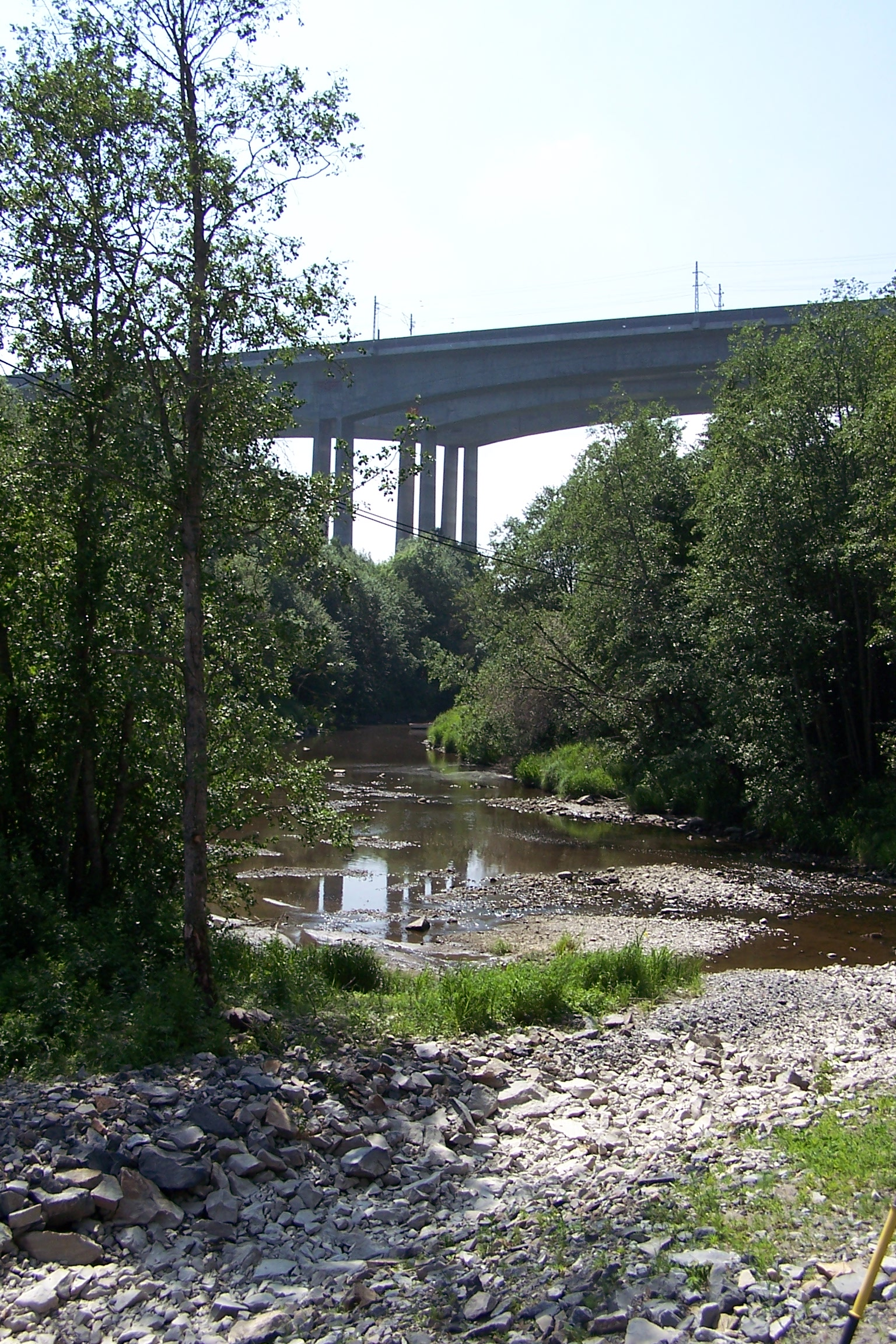
The creek of Såna runs under the bridges

The increased speed meant that a simple double of the existing track was no longer a viable option. In addition to sharp curvature, the railway went over the Hølen Viaduct over the town of Hølen. Planning on this project was therefore carried out jointly between NSB and the Public Roads Administration. Three routes were proposed, a western, middle and eastern route. The decision was finalized in 1993 with the western route selected. Important aspects were construction costs, minimizing the amount agricultural land which was taken and esthetics.

Structural design was contracted to Johs Holt, with the esthetic aspects were designed by Lunde og Løvset. Several designs were considered, with a concrete cantilever and a steel box girder the two finalists. The latter would have a smaller profile, with a girder height of 4.3 meters (14 ft), but the placement of the pillars would force the rerouting of the Såna. The cantilever gave a stiffer construction and higher weight and would also be more dominant in the landscape.

Construction of the railway bridge was carried out first. It opened along with the rest of the railway between Rustad and to Sonsveien on 21 September 1996. Then the road bridges were built. The railway bridge cost 56 million Norwegian kroner, while the freeway bridges cost 118 million kroner. Both were within budget. The bridge won NSB's architectural award for 1997 and all three Betongtavlen in 1999.

== Bibliography ==
- Bjerke, Thor; Holom, Finn (2004). Banedata 2004 (in Norwegian). Hamar / Oslo: Norwegian Railway Museum / Norwegian Railway Club. ISBN 82-90286-28-7.
- Langård, Geir-Widar; Ruud, Leif-Harald (2005). Sydbaneracer og Skandiapil – Glimt fra Østfoldbanen gjennom 125 år (in Norwegian). Oslo: Norwegian Railway Club. ISBN 978-82-90286-29-8.
- Taugbøl, Trond (1998). Hølen – stedet med bruene (in Norwegian). Vestby Municipality.
