= Såna =

River running through Vestby, Norway

Coordinates: 59°31′40″N 10°41′23″E

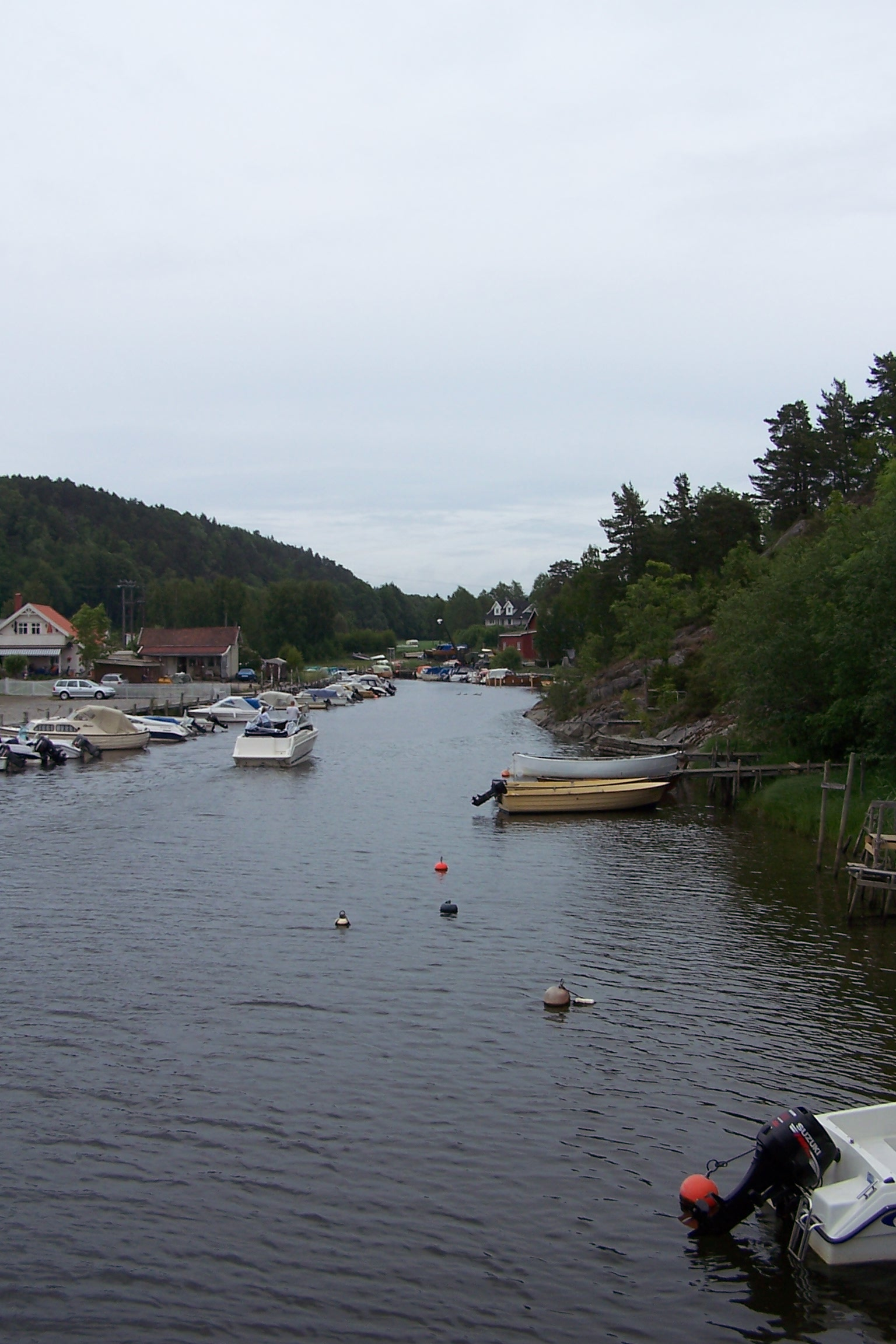
The river just before draining into the Oslofjord

Såna or Hølenelva is a river which runs through Vestby, Norway. Såna collects a number of creeks in Ås and Vestby; it runs through the villages of Såner and Hobøl before draining into the Oslofjord at Son. Among others, the river is crossed by the Hølen Viaduct and Hølendalen Bridges.
