= Saner (surname) =

Saner is a surname. Notable people with the surname include:

- Ersan Saner (born 1966), Prime Minister of Northern Cyprus
- Hulki Saner (1923–2005), Turkish film director, screenwriter and producer
- Julia Saner (born 1992), Swiss model
- Marc Saner (born 1961), biotechnology researcher and professor
- Othmar Saner (fl. 1930s–1940s), Swiss footballer
- Reg Saner (1928 –2021), American poet and academic

== See also ==
- Såner, parish and village in Vestby municipality, Akershus county, Norway
- Såner Station, railway station on the Østfold Line in Norway
- Sanner, a surname
- Sane (disambiguation)
