= Ljungskile =

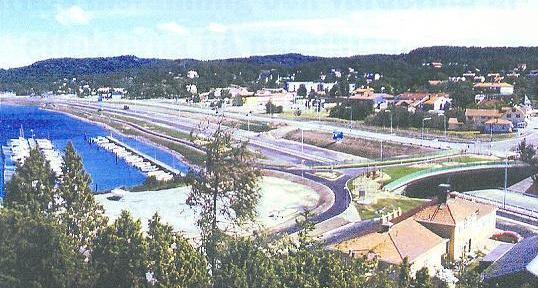
- Ljungskile in Summer 1995

- Location within Västra Götaland Location within Sweden
- Coordinates: 58°13′N 11°55′E
- Country: Sweden
- Province: Bohuslän
- County: Västra Götaland County
- Municipality: Uddevalla Municipality

Area
  - Total: 3.60 km^{2} (1.39 sq mi)

Population (31 December 2010)
  - Total: 3,375
  - Density: 937/km^{2} (2,430/sq mi)
- Time zone: UTC+1 (CET)
  - Summer (DST): UTC+2 (CEST)

Ljungskile (Swedish pronunciation: [jɵŋsˈɕîːlɛ]) is a locality in Uddevalla Municipality, Västra Götaland County, Sweden. It is located approximately 15 kilometers south of Uddevalla, at the coast of Ljungskileviken and at the base of Bredfjället. It had 4 026 inhabitants in 2023.

The locality is home to Lyckorna, the youngest seaside resort in Sweden. It was founded in 1877 by Robert Macfie, a Scottish immigrant. It is also home to Ljungskile Folkhögskola, one of the biggest Folk High Schools in Sweden.

The first half of the locality’s name stems from Ljungs Socken whose church is located in Ljungskile. Meanwhile, a “kile” is an old swedish word which translates roughly to “bay”. “Ljungskile” therefore means "Ljungs’s Bay”.

== Sports ==
The local football team, Ljungskile SK, was founded on the 16:th of May 1926. Despite Ljungskile’s small population, the team managed to reach Allsvenskan, the highest level in the Swedish football league system, where they competed both the 1997 and 2008 seasons. As of 2025 the men’s team has been relegated to Division 1 while the women’s are in Division 2. Their home field is at Skarsjövallen.

Other sport clubs from Ljungskile include:

- Athletics: Hälle IF
- Sailing: Ljungskile Segelsällskap
- Golf: Lyckorna Golfklubb
- Tennis: Ljungskile Tennisförening

== Transport ==
=== Roads ===
In Ljungskile, the European route E6 connects with the county road 167 toward Lilla Edet.

=== Bus ===
The local bus line, the 826, goes in a loop through Lyckorna and Hälle before returning to Ljungskile Station. From there, there are two lines going toward Kampenhof Resecentrum in central Uddevalla, one line via Grohed and one via Ammenäs.

There are also two express lines stopping at Ljungskile Station, both of which only stopping in Kungälv before reaching their terminus in Gothenburg. After Ljungskile, one of the lines continues non-stop to central Uddevalla, while the other becomes a slower paced ride towards Lysekil after passing Torp Terminalen.

=== Train ===
Ljungskile Station is part of the Bohus Line.
