= Lanesund och Överby =

- Location within Västra Götaland Location within Sweden
- Coordinates: 58°20′20″N 11°43′00″E
- Country: Sweden
- Province: Västergötland
- County: Västra Götaland County
- Municipality: Uddevalla Municipality

Area
  - Total: 0.65 km^{2} (0.25 sq mi)

Population (31 December 2010)
  - Total: 347
  - Density: 533/km^{2} (1,380/sq mi)
- Time zone: UTC+1 (CET)
  - Summer (DST): UTC+2 (CEST)

Lanesund och Överby is a locality situated in Uddevalla Municipality, Västra Götaland County, Sweden with 347 inhabitants in 2010.
