= Sanner =

Sanner is a surname. Notable people with the surname include:

- Beth Sanner (fl. 2010s–2020s), American government official
- Felix J. Sanner (1867–1946), New York politician
- Glen Sanner, astronomer for whom main-belt Asteroid 38203 Sanner is named
- Jan Tore Sanner (born 1965), Norwegian politician
- Sydney Sanner (1872–1961), justice of the Montana Supreme Court
- Thomas Sanner (born 1994), American soccer player

== See also ==
- Tomena Sanner, 2009 video game by Konami
- Såner, parish and village in Vestby municipality, Akershus county, Norway
- Saner (surname)
