= Follo Folk High School =

Follo Folkehøgskole
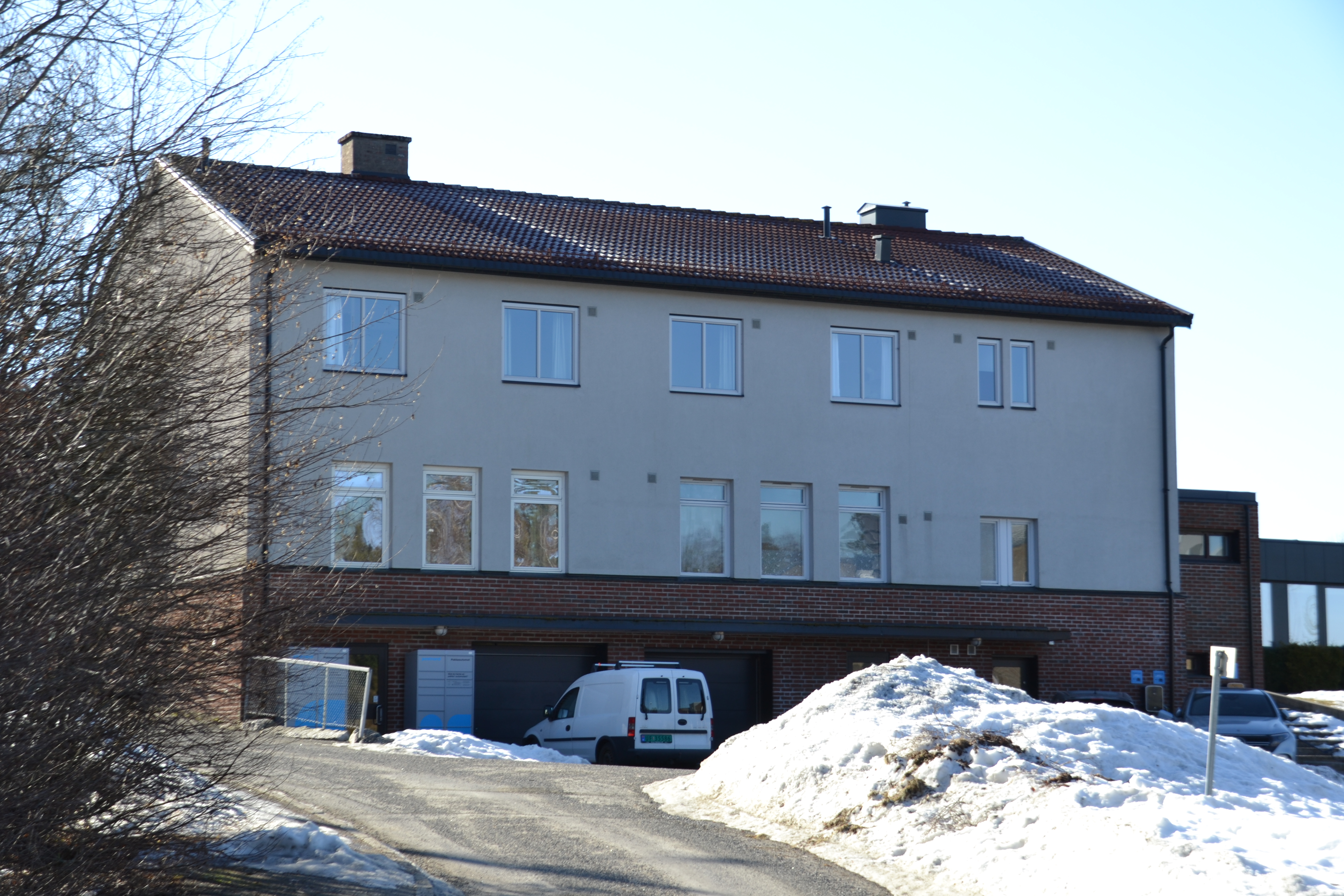
- Follo Folk High School in 2024

Location
- Vestby, Akershus; Norway
- Coordinates: 59°35′56″N 10°45′06″E

Information
- Head teacher: Jan Martin Medhaug
- Enrolment: 105
- Campus: Rural
- Website: www.follo.fhs.no

Follo Folk High School (Follo Folkehøgskole in Norwegian) is located in Vestby, Akershus, Norway, a community of approximately 13,150 inhabitants.

The school accepts 105 students annually. The main campus houses a library, gymnasium with theatre stage, dance studio, auditorium, dining hall, workshops for arts and crafts, and a recording studio.

Follo Folk High School provides no vocational or professional training and awards no formal academic credits. However, students do complete a year of systematic education and receive a certificate of attendance showing their participation in different activities.

All instruction is held in Norwegian. Courses include personal training, dance/hiphop, vocals (solo and choir), musical theatre, band (non-orchestral) and film.
