= Byfjorden =

Byfjorden may refer to several fjords in Scandinavia:

== Places ==
=== Norway ===
- Byfjorden (Vestland), a fjord in the city of Bergen in Vestland county
- Byfjorden (Rogaland), a fjord in the city of Stavanger in Rogaland county
- Byfjorden (Agder), a fjord in the city of Kristiansand in Agder county
- Byfjorden (Tønsberg), a fjord in the city of Tønsberg in Vestfold county

=== Sweden ===
- Byfjorden (Sweden), a fjord in Bohuslän in Västra Götaland county
