= Utby =

- Location within Västra Götaland Location within Sweden
- Coordinates: 58°20′N 11°47′E
- Country: Sweden
- Province: Bohuslän
- County: Västra Götaland County
- Municipality: Uddevalla Municipality

Area
  - Total: 0.41 km^{2} (0.16 sq mi)

Population (31 December 2010)
  - Total: 267
  - Density: 657/km^{2} (1,700/sq mi)
- Time zone: UTC+1 (CET)
  - Summer (DST): UTC+2 (CEST)

Utby is a locality situated in Uddevalla Municipality, Västra Götaland County, Sweden with 267 inhabitants in 2010.
