= Hølen =

Coordinates: 59°32′N 10°44′E

- Former town and municipality
- Location in Akershus
- Country: Norway
- Region: Østlandet
- County: Akershus
- Time zone: UTC+01:00 (CET)
  - Summer (DST): UTC+02:00 (CEST)

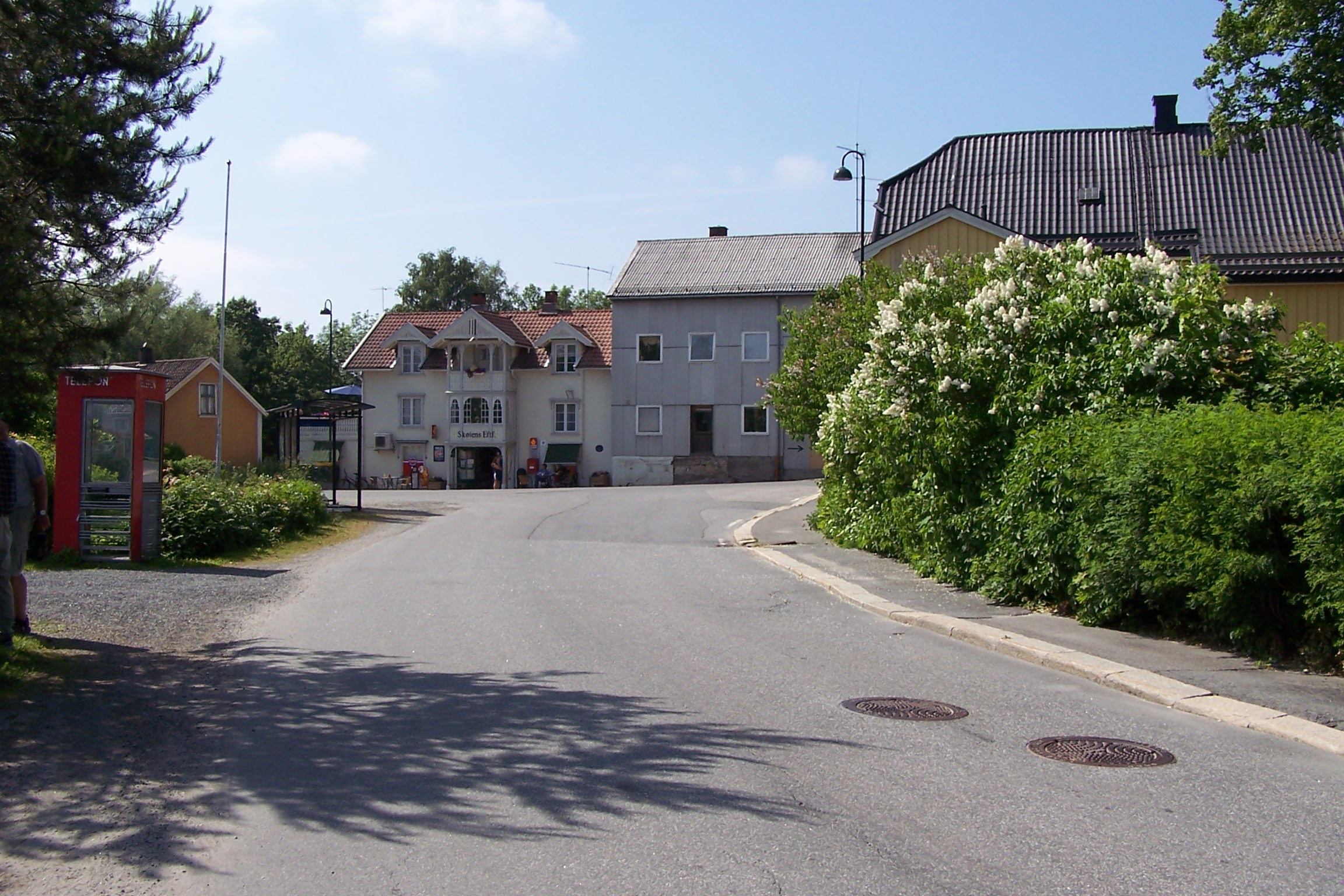
Hølen, torget (market square)

Hølen is a village and former town and municipality in Akershus county, Norway.

Hølen was in early times known for the production of timber, and from the 17th century important trade took place. Timber was floated on the river Såna. Ships from the Netherlands visited the place.

The small town of Hølen was, together with the small town of Son, established as a municipality January 1, 1838 (see formannskapsdistrikt). Son and Hølen were separated as municipalities of their own January 1, 1848. Hølen was merged with the rural municipality Vestby July 1, 1943 – and it then lost its status as a town.

Hølen is the smallest municipality (in area) that has ever existed in Norway – the total area was just 0.12 km^{2}.

The Østfold Line was completed in 1879. It was placed on the Hølen Viaduct which crosses over the town. Hølen Station opened in 1931 and remained in use until 1996, when it and the viaduct were closed and the railway rerouted via the Hølendalen Bridges.

== Name origins ==
Hølen is the finite form of høl m 'pool' (in a river).
