= Axel Jacob Petersson =

Swedish-Norwegian structural engineer

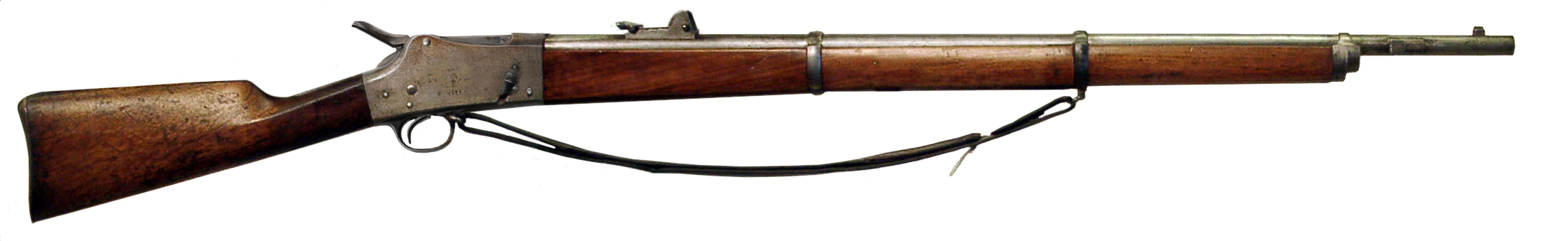
- Krag-Petersson rifle
- Born: 1834; Öland, Sweden
- Died: January 15, 1884 (aged 49–50); Kristiania, Norway
- Occupation: Engineer
- Years active: 1855–81
- Notable work: Ljan Viaduct, Minnesund Railway Bridge, Hølen Viaduct, Krag–Petersson

Axel Jacob Petersson (1834–15 January 1884) was a Swedish-Norwegian structural engineer and inventor. He is most noted for his work with railway bridges and viaducts in Norway from the 1860s through the 1870s, as well as developing the Krag–Petersson rifle.

== Biography ==
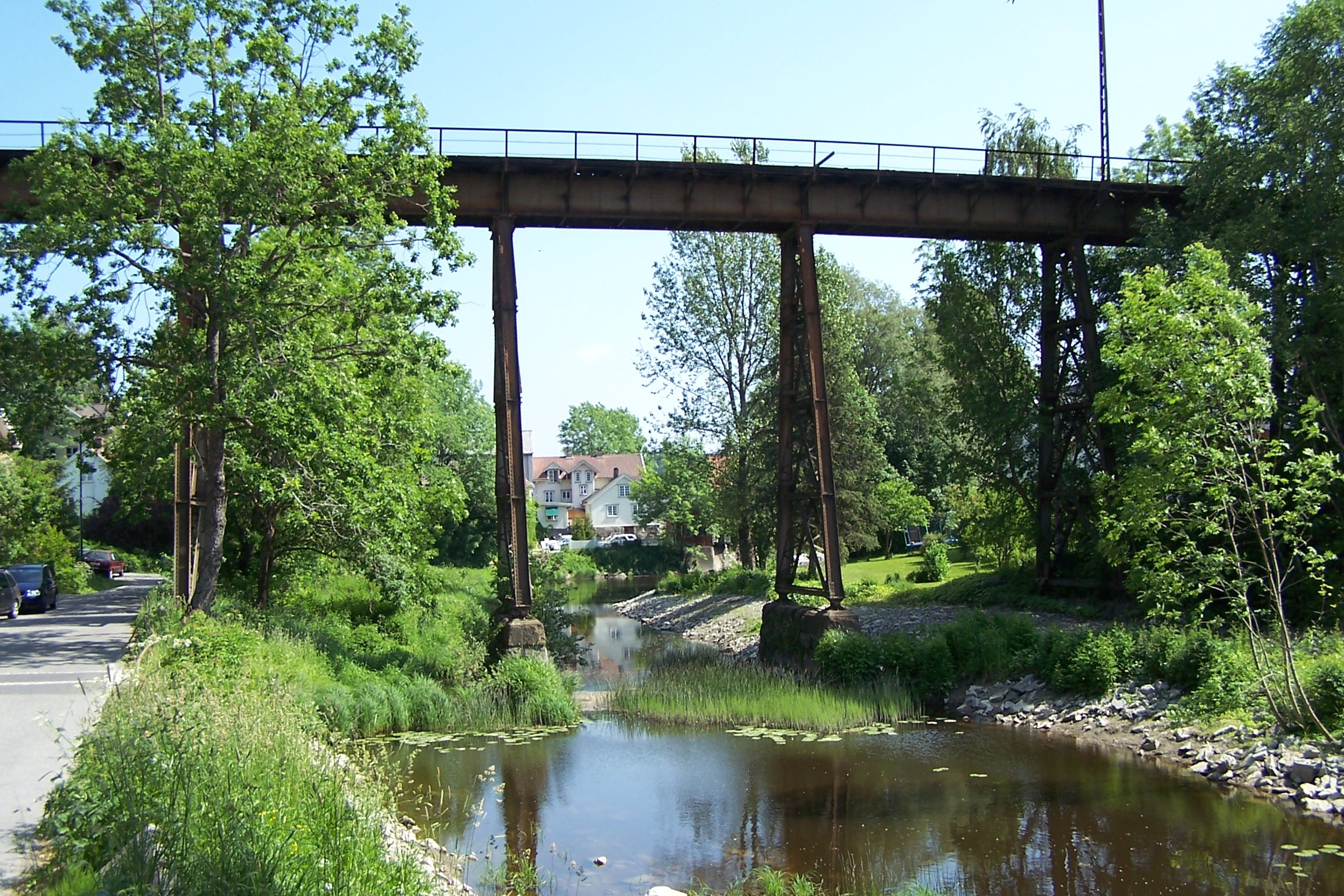
Hølen railroad bridge in Akershus

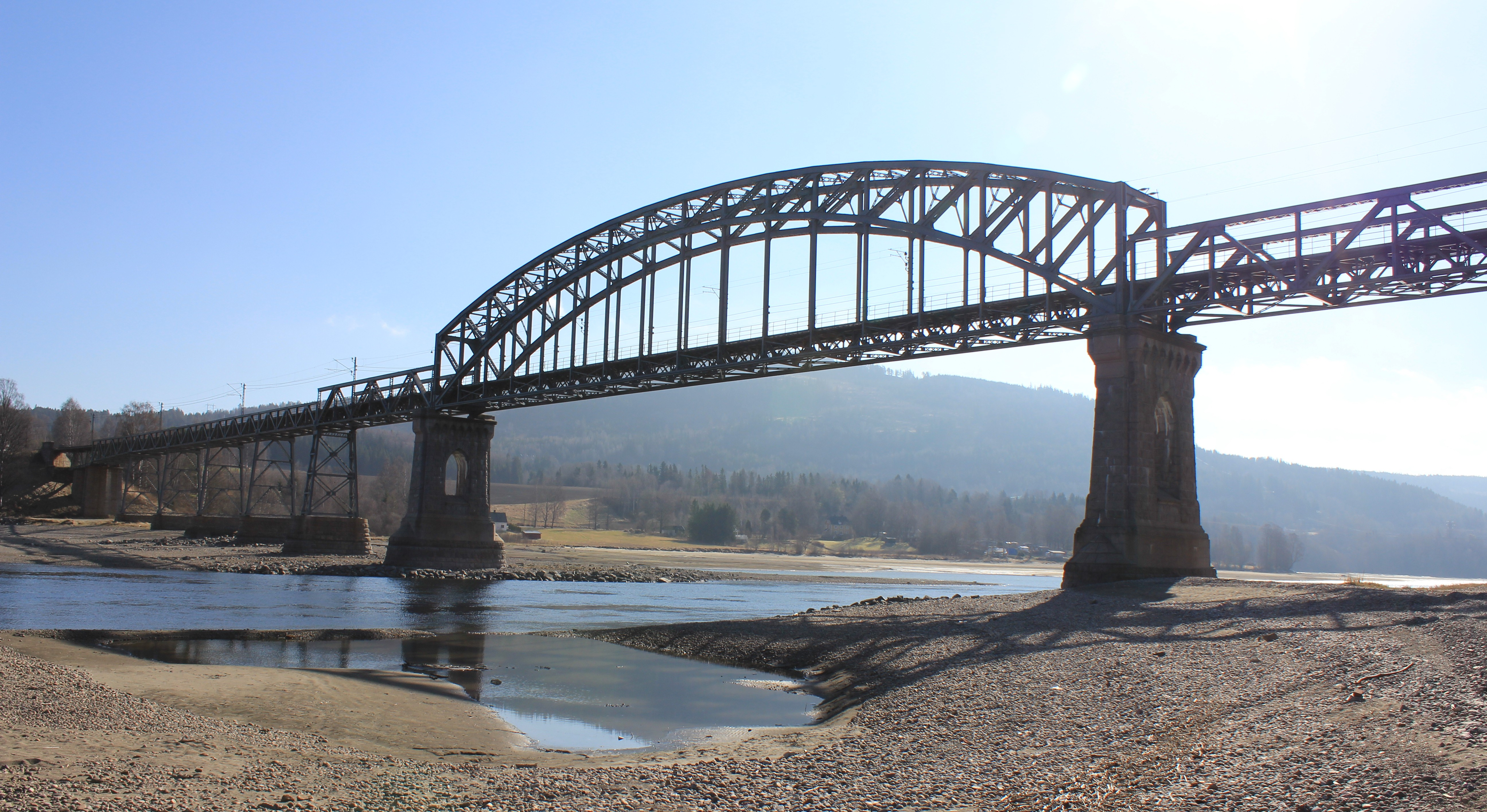
Minnesund railway bridge in Eidsvoll

Petersson was born in Öland in 1834. He studied at the Royal Institute of Technology in Stockholm between 1852 and 1855. He worked for the Swedish Canal Administration and later for a private railway in Sweden. He moved to Norway in 1859, after he was hired as an assistant engineer for the construction of the Kongsvinger Line. By 1865 he was hired as the chief of the Railway Construction Office. He was responsible for construction of bridges and viaducts on the Østfold Line and the Dovre Line between Eidsvoll and Hamar.

By 1881 Peterson had poor health and retired. He died on 15 January 1884 in Christiania (now Oslo), Norway. There was a story that stayed around for a long time that the constructor of the Ljan Viaduct had committed suicide before its opening because he did not trust it to stand. Geir-Wider Langård has proposed that this folklore arose with the magnitude of the bridge combined with the Tay Bridge disaster in Scotland which killed 75 people when it collapsed the same year as the Ljan Viaduct opened in 1879.

== Works ==
Some of the larger constructions were the Minnesund Railway Bridge (opened in 1880, closed in 2023 to be repurposed as a bicycle path; known in Norwegian as Minnesund Jernbanebru), Ljan Viaduct (Ljansbroen), Hølen Viaduct (Hølen viadukt) and Sarp Bridge (Sarpsbroene). Petersson invented the pendular pillar principle, which was first applied on Hølen Viaduct.

Petersson also made a series of other inventions. He developed a rotating camera and calculating machines. He cooperated with Ole Herman Johannes Krag to develop the Krag–Petersson rifle, which was a mainstay in the Norwegian military for decades.

== Bibliography ==
- Regler for Maskindeles Konstruktion (1866, 1877) with C. M. Guldberg
- Regler for Vandhjuls og Turbiners Konstruktion (1868) with C. M. Guldberg
