= Garder =

- Village
- Location in Akershus
- Coordinates: 59°34′52″N 10°48′34″E
- Country: Norway
- Region: Østlandet
- County: Akershus
- Municipality: Vestby
- Time zone: UTC+01:00 (CET)
  - Summer (DST): UTC+02:00 (CEST)

Garder is a parish and village in Vestby municipality, Akershus county, Norway.

== The name ==
The parish is named after the old farm Garder (Norse Garðar), since the first church was built there. The name is the plural of garðr 'fence; farm'.
