= Fagerhult, Uddevalla Municipality =

Fagerhult
- Location within Västra Götaland Location within Sweden
- Coordinates: 58°25′N 12°01′E
- Country: Sweden
- Province: Bohuslän
- County: Västra Götaland County
- Municipality: Uddevalla Municipality

Area
  - Total: 0.35 km^{2} (0.14 sq mi)

Population (31 December 2010)
  - Total: 353
  - Density: 1,023/km^{2} (2,650/sq mi)
- Time zone: UTC+1 (CET)
  - Summer (DST): UTC+2 (CEST)

Fagerhult is a locality situated in Uddevalla Municipality, Västra Götaland County, Sweden with 353 inhabitants in 2010.
