= Hogstorp =

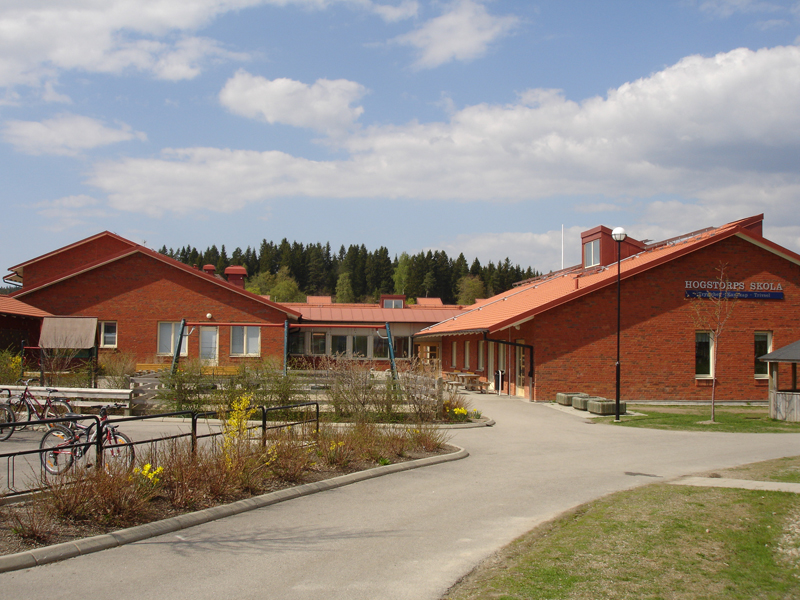
- The school in Hogstorp

- Location within Västra Götaland Location within Sweden
- Coordinates: 58°24′N 11°45′E
- Country: Sweden
- Province: Bohuslän
- County: Västra Götaland County
- Municipality: Uddevalla Municipality

Area
  - Total: 0.65 km^{2} (0.25 sq mi)

Population (2023)
  - Total: 385
  - Density: 592/km^{2} (1,530/sq mi)
- Time zone: UTC+1 (CET)
  - Summer (DST): UTC+2 (CEST)

Hogstorp is a locality situated in Uddevalla Municipality, Västra Götaland County, Sweden. It is located at the base of Herrestadsfjället and it had 385 inhabitants in 2023.

The locality’s name comes from the Swedish words “hög” (translates to "(a) pile" or "tall") and “torp”.

== Sports ==
The local sports club, Hogstorps IF, was founded in 1949 and has their football field on the mountain west of Hogstorp.

== Connections ==
The locality is situated at an interchange on European Route E6. It is served by some of the bus routes between Uddevalla and Munkedal. The Bohus Line splits the locality in two, though the station was closed down in 1971.

== Future development ==
Due to the predictions that the Fehmarn Belt fixed link will increase the amount of freight trains entering Scandinavia, major investments are being made in new transshipment points in Sweden. Real estate company Venturi Fastigheter are planning to build one in Hogstorp, as they deem the locality a strategic location due to its proximity to the Swedish rail network, the European Route E6, as well as the Uddevalla Harbour. Hogstorp logistik och service, as the site will be named, is planned to be built just south of the locality and to cover a bit less than 1 square kilometre.
