= Johannes Holt =

Norwegian engineer and resistance member

Johannes Holt (12 November 1917 – 11 January 2011) was a Norwegian resistance member, engineer and mountaineer.

He grew up in Andebu Municipality and took his construction engineering education at the Norwegian Institute of Technology. He worked with bridges in the Norwegian Public Roads Administration, and also participated in the Norwegian Campaign in 1940. From 1941 to 1945 he was a resistance member in XU; smuggling bridge designs to be microfilmed and duplicated. Accomplices in doing so include fellow bridge engineer Arne Selberg. At the same time Holt was a liaison to the Reichskommissariat Norwegen and Organisation Todt, the forces against which XU fought, "because of his mastering of the German language".

After leaving the Public Roads Administration in 1949, he worked in Berntsen og Boe from 1949 to 1951, Nordisk Aluminiumindustri from 1951 to 1953 and Berntsen og Boe again from 1953 to 1957. He spent most of his career as chief executive of his own construction consulting company Johs Holt AS, from 1957 to 1981. Important projects include Stavanger City Bridge, the first larger cable-stayed bridge in Norway, as well as the even larger cable-stayed bridges Skarnsund Bridge and Uddevalla Bridge. He also worked with the fundaments for the monument Sverd i fjell.

Holt was a member of the mountaineering society Norsk Tindeklub. Having taken up mountaineering in his fifties, Holt ascended mountains like Store Skagastølstind at the age of 86 and Stetind at the age of 87. He lived in Nadderud until he died in January 2011.
