= Uddevalla Bridge =

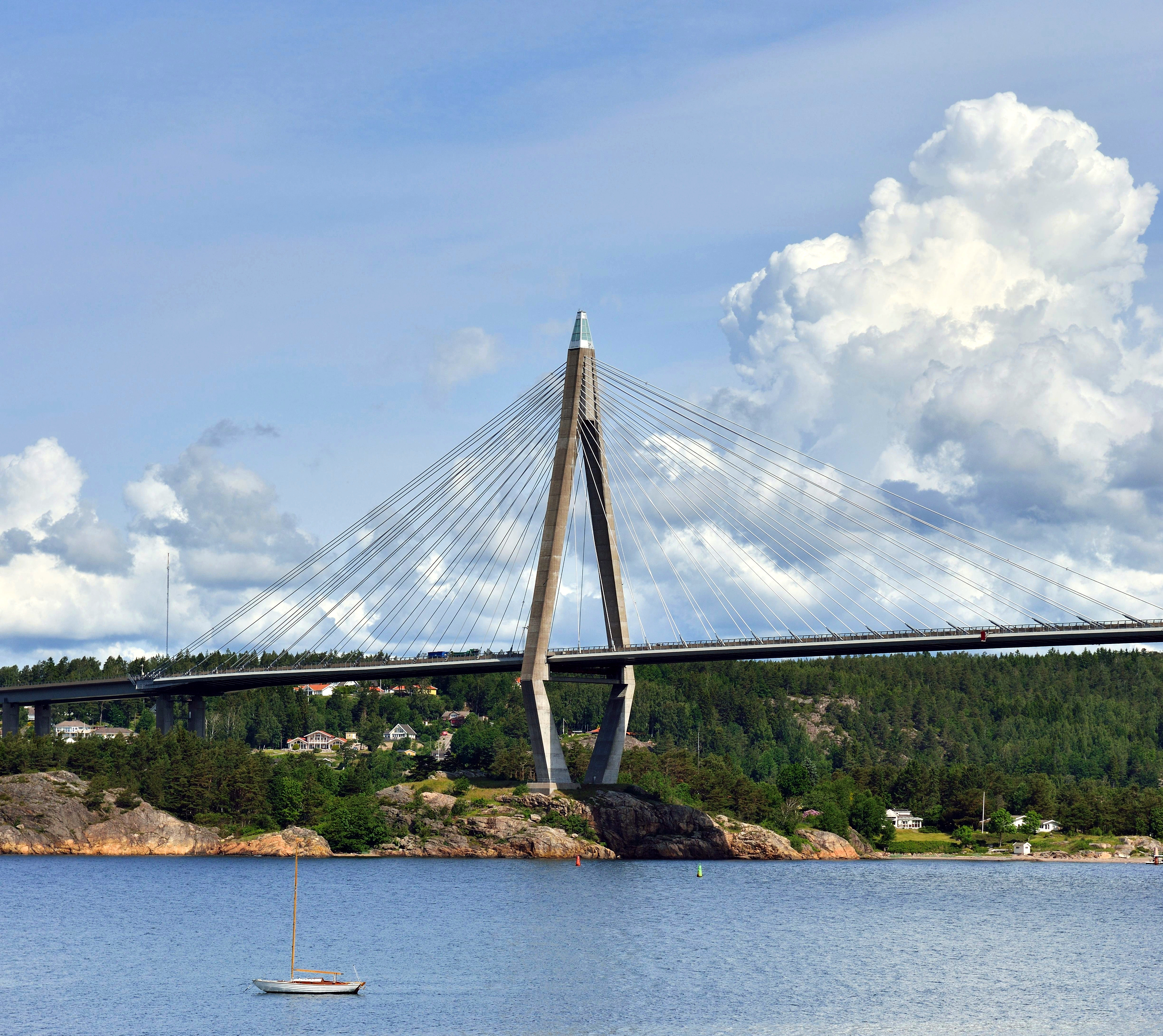
- Uddevalla Bridge
- Coordinates: 58.325091°N 11.845161°E
- Carries: European route E6
- Crosses: Sunninge sound
- Locale: Uddevalla Municipality, Sweden
- Official name: Sunningesund Bridge
- Maintained by: Swedish National Road Administration

Characteristics
- Design: Cable-stayed bridge
- Total length: 1,712 m (5,617 ft)
- Width: 2 vehicular lanes in each direction
- Longest span: 414 m (1,358 ft)
- Clearance below: 51 m (167 ft)

History
- Opened: 20 May 2000

Statistics
- Daily traffic: 10,000 vehicles

Location
- Interactive map of Uddevalla Bridge

The Uddevalla Bridge (Swedish: Uddevallabron) is a cable-stayed bridge crossing Sunninge sound near Uddevalla in the province of Bohuslän on the west coast of Sweden. The bridge was constructed as part of the rerouting of the European route E6 outside Uddevalla, which reduced traffic congestion in the city and shortened traveling distance by 12.8 km (8.0 mi).

== Dimensions ==
The total length is 1,712 m (5,617 ft), with a main span of 414 m (1,358 ft), there are a number of small approach spans at each end, and the two cable stayed side spans are 179 m (587 ft) each. It is 23.3 m (76 ft) wide, the clearance below the bridge is 51 m (167 ft), and the two pylons are 149 m (489 ft) high. The cables are organised in a semi-fan arrangement.

The bridge was constructed in 1996–2000 and was opened for traffic on 20 May 2000.

== Construction notes ==
Structural engineering for the bridge was carried out by Johs Holt AS, and Skanska Teknik AB. Skanska also served as general contractor, with subcontractors Alpin Technik und Ingenieurservice GmbH (general), VSL International (cables), Mageba (bearings), and PERI GmbH (formwork and scaffolding).

The cables are steel and the deck is composite steel-reinforced concrete, while the pylons are reinforced concrete. About 9,000 t (20,000,000 lb) of structural steel and 35,000 m^{3} (1,200,000 cu ft) of concrete were used. The bridge and the connecting Sunningeleden cost of SEK 900 M (US$111 M) in 2000 currency values. There is a problem with ice sticking to the cables in the winter, which can fall onto cars. The bridge has to be closed a few times per year for this reason. The alternative road is 12.8 km (8.0 mi) longer. Civil engineers have tested pulse electro-thermal de-icing - a way to use a burst of electricity to remove ice caked on walls or windows. For surfaces coated with a special film, the jolt gets rid of ice in less than a second, far less time than it takes to hack at it with an ice scraper.
