= Torp Köpcentrum =

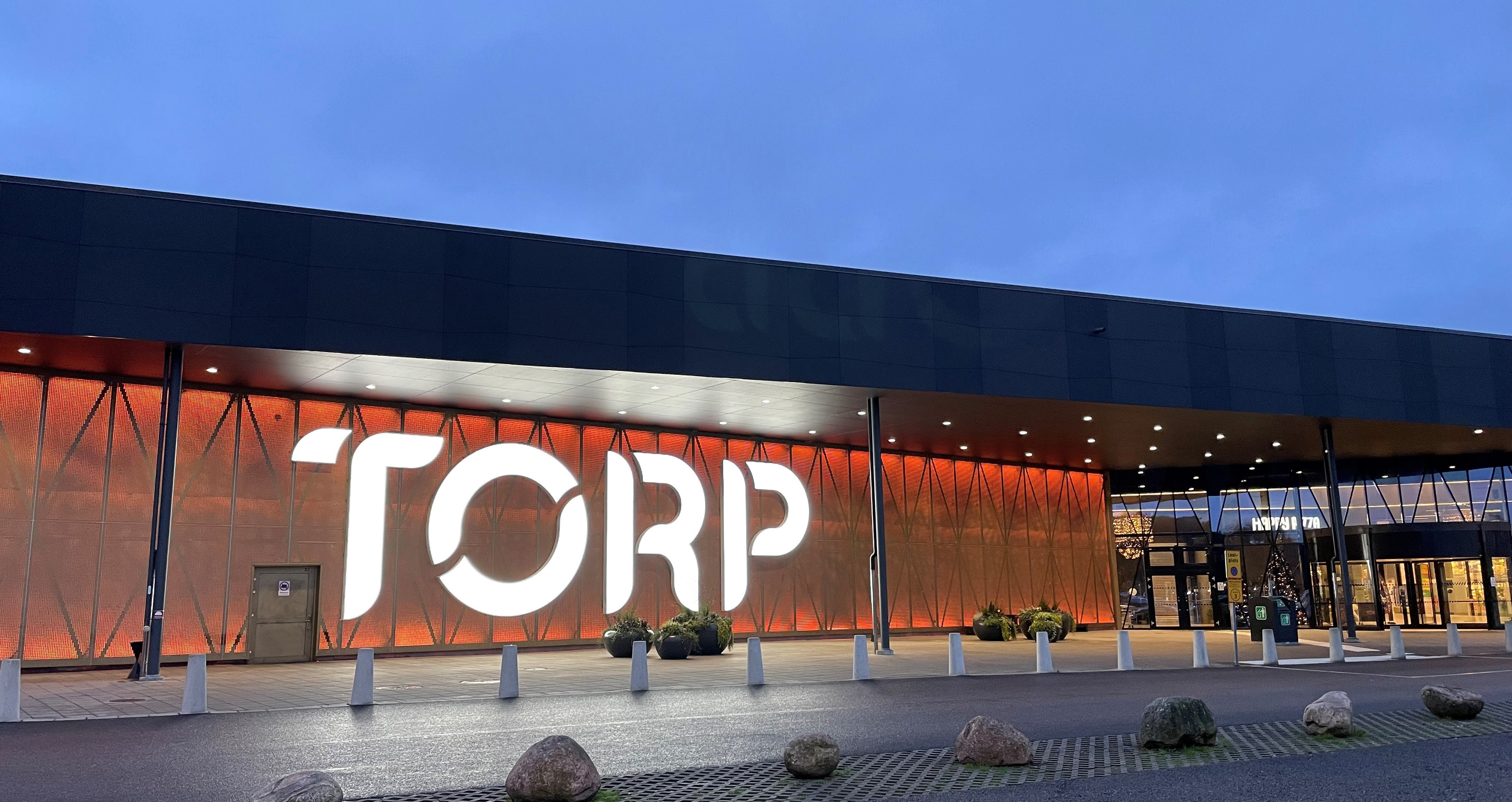
- Location: Uddevalla, Sweden
- Coordinates: 58°21′14″N 11°48′34″E
- Opened: 13 June 1991
- Manager: Olav Thon Property
- Owner: Olav Thon Property
- Num. of stores: 100
- Floor area: 59 800 m^{2}
- Parking: 3,300
- Website: torp.se

Torp Köpcentrum is a shopping mall located next to the highway (E6), about seven kilometres northwest of Uddevalla. Torp has currently around 100 shops, 1000 employees and 3300 free parking spaces. Torp shopping mall owned by Olav Thon Property

== Information ==
- Establishment year 1991
- Expansion 1998 Trade trade
- Expansion 2000 Bauhaus
- Extension 2001 Western Torp
- Extension 2006 auto parts store, plantation
- Extension 2022 from 60 stores to 100 stores. Today 59 800m². Including specialist trade, grocery stores. pharmacy, restaurants and liquorstore
- Number of shops around 100
- Number of parking spaces 3,300
- Number of employees approx. 1000

== Trade surfaces gross ==
- Torp Köpcentrum 59 800m²
- ICA 6,000 m2
- Trade trade 20,700 m2
- McDonald 's/Preem 800 m2
- Bauhaus 9 500 m2
- Biltema, Plantagen 11,000 m2
- East Torp, with IKEA and 9 stores 58,000 m2
- Trading area a total of 165,800 m2

== Sales and visitor development Year Turnover Million gross Visit thousand ==
Year	Turnover Million gross	Visit thousand
2024	1 930	6 205

Torp shopping centre is a regional shopping centre located 7 miles north of Uddevalla, Västra Götaland County, Sweden. Property owner: Thon Property, ICA and others.

== The following stores are at Torp ==
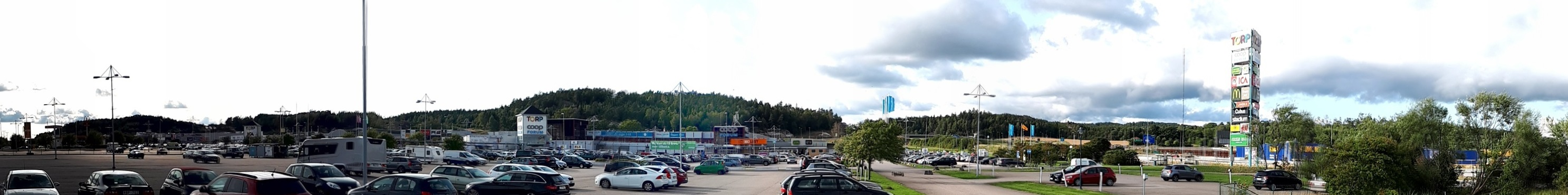
Panorama of Torp Köpcentrum

- Bagoholic
- Böcker & Blad
- COOP Forum
- ICA Maxi
- Kahls The & Kaffehandel
- Pressbyrån
- Bastard Burgers
- Systembolaget
- Albrekts Guld
- Glitter
- Smycka Stjärnurmakarna
- Cervera
- Guldfynd
- Hunkemöller
- New Yorker
- Hemtex
- Synsam Outlet
- Natur kompaniet
- Lyko
- KICKS
- Life
- Tefal OBH Nordica
- Panduro Hobby
- Teknikmagasinet
- Accent
- BikBok
- Brothers
- Carlings
- Cubus
- Din Sko
- Telenor
- Dressman
- Dressmann XL
- Johanssons Skor
- Lager 157
- Eurosko
- Evanette
- Gina Tricot
- H&M
- Indiska Magasinet
- Jack & Jones
- ONGO
- Åhlen´s Outlet
- KappAhl
- Lindex
- MQ
- Pondus
- Scorett
- Lundbergs Väskor & Handskar
- Vero Moda
- Venus frisör
- COOP Forum Restaurang
- McDonald´s
- SOYA
- Subway
- Apoteket Måsen
- Forex
- Kronans Apotek
- Fast Minit skomakare
- Preem
- Bauhaus
- Biltema
- Lekia
- Babya
- Arken Zoo
- Zoo.se
- Sportshoppen
- Intersport
- Kjell & Company
- Skechers
- Elon ljud & Bild
- Gottebiten
- Rituals
- Plantagen
- Stadium
- Teliabutiken
- Tre
- Smycka Stjärnurmakarna
- Specsavers
- Synsam
- Ur & Penn
- VILA
- ONLY
- Barber shop
- Månöga
- Waynes Coffey
- Mangal kolgrill
- CTR Chicken
- Sushi Yama
- Taco Bar
- Espresso House
- Brothers
- MQ Marqet

== See also ==
- List of shopping centres in Sweden
