= Son, Norway =

Son
- Town
- Location within Akershus
- Coordinates: 59°31′25″N 10°41′15″E
- Country: Norway
- County: Akershus
- Municipality: Vestby
- Time zone: UTC+1 (CET)
  - Summer (DST): UTC+2 (CEST)

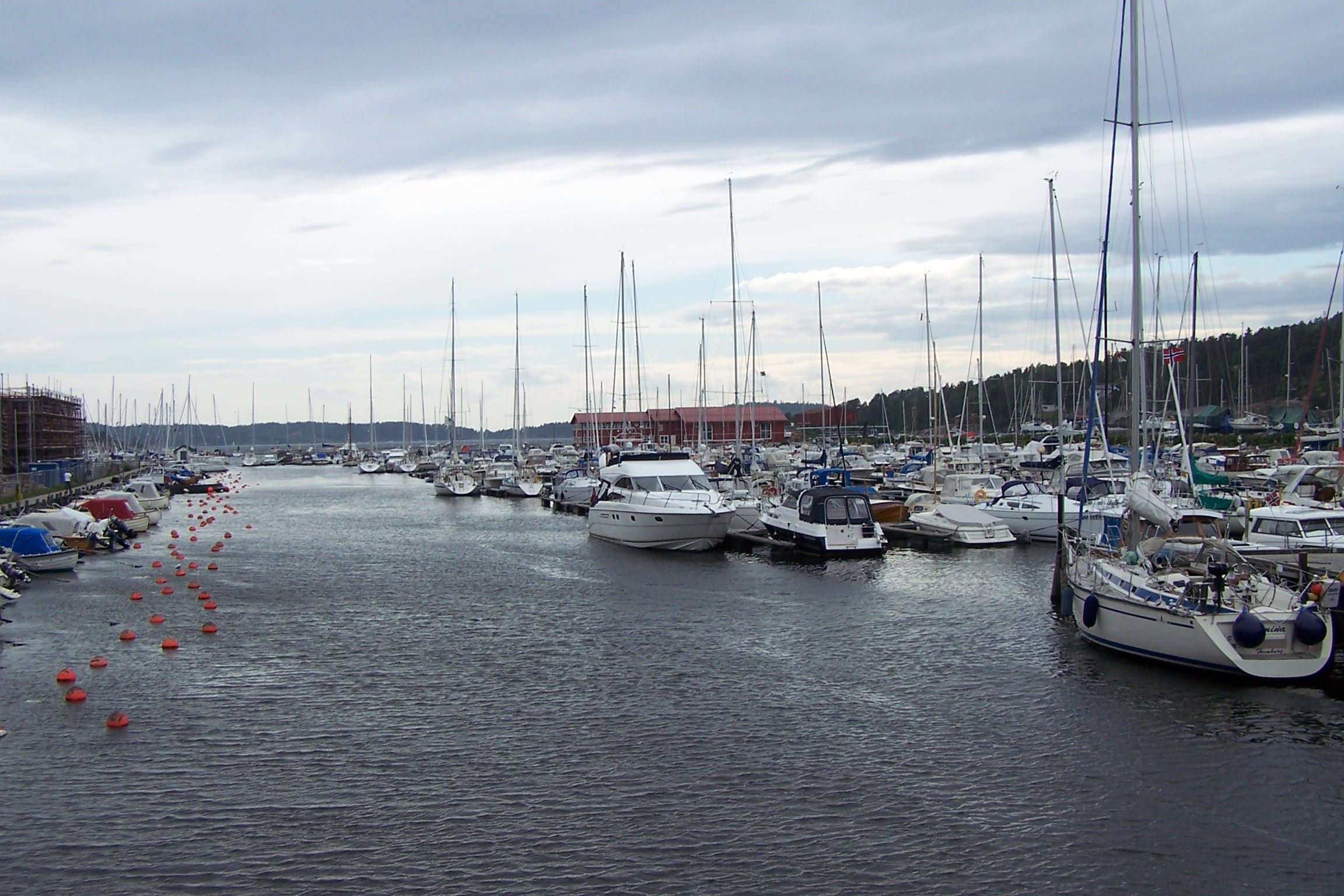

Son is an old town, and a former municipality. It is located in Vestby municipality in Akershus.

== Overview ==
Son is located at the Oslofjord, 50 kilometres south of the Norwegian capital Oslo, just north of Moss and near the border of Østfold, and is located west of the village of Hølen. Before the merge with Vestby the number of inhabitants in Son was about 800–900 (1940). Today, Son, including Store Brevik has 5035 inhabitants (2006).

Son, together with the village of Hølen, was established as a municipality January 1, 1838 (see formannskapsdistrikt). Son and Hølen were separated as municipalities of their own January 1, 1848. On January 1, 1964, Son was merged with Vestby and then lost its status as a town (ladested).

== History ==
In the Renaissance era, Son became famous as a harbour. Timber came from the nearby areas and was partially floated down the river. On many Dutch maps from that time (the oldest being from 1582) the Oslo fjord is noted as Zoon Water. However, when this period ended, Son lost much of its importance.

Later, Son became known as an 'artist town', as many well-known painters and writers have resided there.

== The name ==
The name Son is pronounced with a long [u] > [su:n].

Son is probably the old name of the river Hølenselva (Norse *Són). Some distance up this river lies the parish Såner (Norse Sánar), and this name is most likely the plural of *Són. In Norse literature is the word són used as a poetic word for blood, and it is probably an old word for liquid.

Until 1889 the name was written Soon.
