= Kjell & Company =

Swedish store chain

Kjell and Company
- Founded: September 4, 1988
- Headquarters: Malmö, Sweden

Kjell & Company is a Swedish store chain that sells mainly electronic peripherals. The first store opened in Malmö in 1990 and the company has expanded greatly during the last few years. The stores are spread across Sweden but with a slightly higher concentration in the south and Stockholm. In 2015, Kjell and Company expanded their business by opening up multiple stores in Norway. By autumn 2018, there were a total of 115 stores in Sweden and Norway.

The company releases a catalogue bi-annually, with quick guides to different technological standards, "Fråga Kjell" (ask Kjell), to help the consumer make an informed choice. These are also available on the company's website.

== History ==
Kjell & Company was founded in 1988 by Marcus Dahnelius together with his two brothers and his father Kjell.

These are a few of the milestones in the history of Kjell & Company:

- 1988: The Dahnelius family create the foundation of the business (in Sundsvall).
- 1990: The family moves to Malmö and open the first Kjell & Company store.
- 1992: Kjell & Company release their first catalogue.
- 2005: Hakon Invest (now known as ICA-Gruppen) become part-owners and the growth accelerates.
- 2007: Kjell & Company open a purchasing office in Shanghai, and relocate their logistics department to Malmö.
- 2009: Kjell & Company publish the first version of their book ”Hur funkar det?” (Swedish for "How does it work?").
- 2014: The Norwegian company FSN Capital become a new majority owner and renew the growth strategy.
- 2015: Kjell & Company open their first store in Norway.
- 2016: Kjell & Company open their 100th store (counting both Norway and Sweden) in Hässleholm.
- 2017: Kjell & Company open their 100th store in Sweden (Trelleborg). The customer membership program "Kjell & Company Kundklubb" ("customer club") starts recruiting in February and reaches 1 000 000 members by December same year.
