= Sarp Bridge =

Sarp Bridge Sarpsbrua
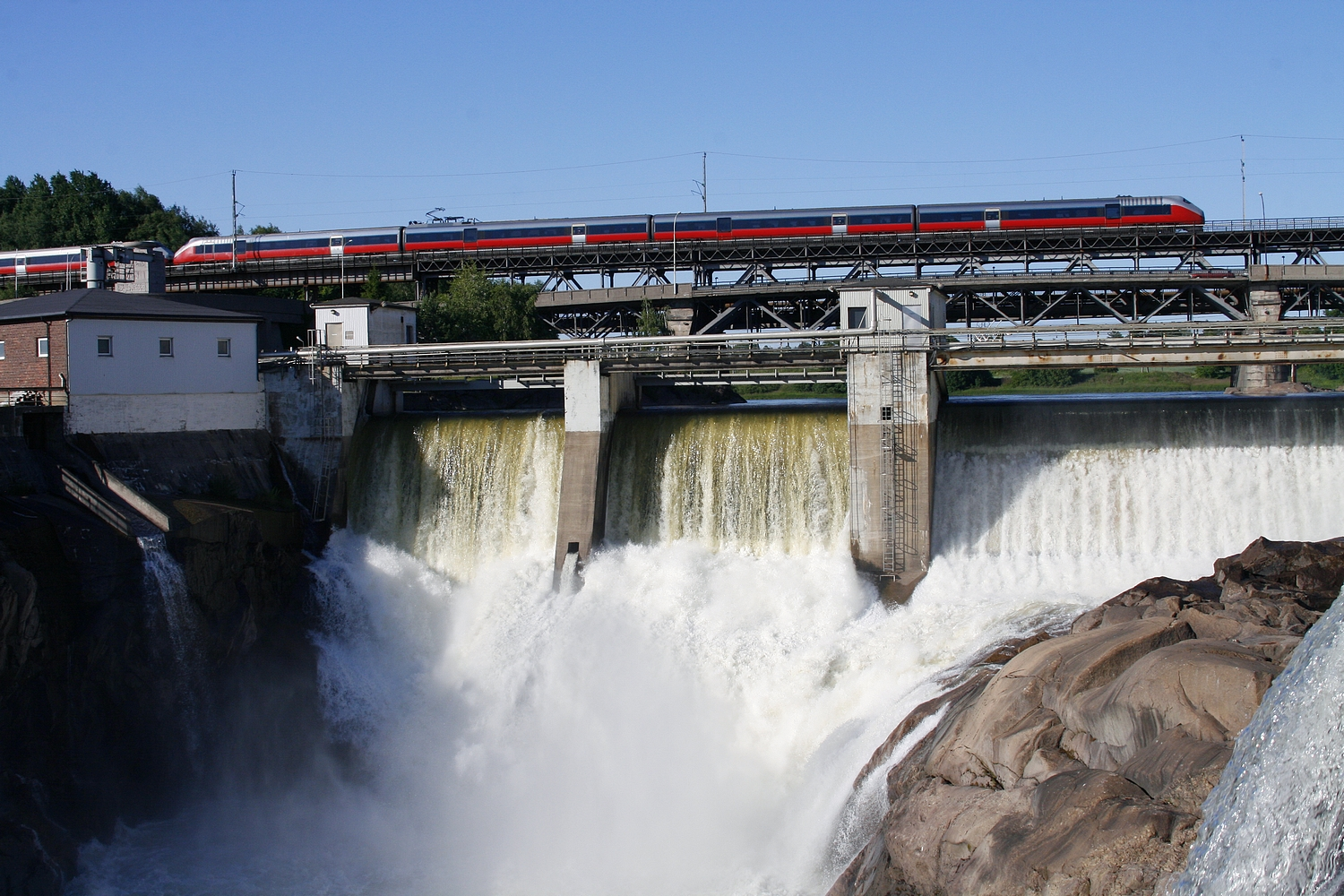
- NSB Class 73 train crossing the bridge
- Coordinates: 59.276°N 11.132°E
- Carries: Østfold Line; National Road 118
- Crosses: Sarpsfossen, Glomma
- Locale: Sarpsborg, Østfold, Norway
- Owner: Norwegian National Rail Administration; Norwegian Public Roads Administration

Characteristics
- Design: Truss
- Material: Steel
- Total length: 247 m (810 ft)
- Longest span: 53 m (174 ft)
- No. of spans: 3

History
- Engineering design by: Christian Vilhelm Bergh (1854); Axel Jacob Petersson (1879); Hans Tønnesen (1938)
- Constructed by: Skanska
- Opened: 25 February 1854
- Rebuilt: 1879, 1938, 1943, 1977

Sarp Bridge (Norwegian: Sarpsbrua or Sarpebrua) is a group of bridges which cross Sarpefossen, a waterfall of the river Glomma in Sarpsborg, Norway. One bridge carries a pathway, one carries a single track of the Østfold Line and one carries two lanes of National Road 118. The road and pathway bridges are about 91 meters (299 ft) long, while the railway bridge is 247 meters (810 ft).

The first bridge at the site was a brick suspension bridge opened on 25 February 1854. It was rebuilt as a multilayer bridge and opened with rail tracks on an upper truss level on 2 January 1879. In order to strengthen the railway, a new steel truss railway bridge opened on 9 May 1931. The former bridge was then rebuilt as a wider road bridge. An accident on 15 April 1940 caused the fire department to blow away one of the pillars, collapsing the superstructure. A new road bridge was completed in 1943. The two were supplemented with a separate pathway bridge in 1977. There are plans to replace the existing bridges with a four-lane road and three-track railway bridge, scheduled for no later than 2030.

== Specifications ==
There are three current bridges which cross over Sarpefossen, which is also referred to as Sarpsfossen. Upstream is a pathway bridge for bicycles and pedestrians. In the middle is a railway bridge and furthest downstream is a road bridge.

The railway bridge is officially named Bridge over Glomma at Sarpsfossen (Bru over Glomma ved Sarpsfossen). The steel truss bridge carries a single track of the Østfold Line, with the western end of the bridge situated 110.0 kilometers (68.4 mi) from Oslo Central Station. It has an overall length of 247 meters (810 ft), including viaducts on both sides of the bridge proper. The main span is 53 meters (174 ft), with two side spans measuring 29 meters (95 ft). The total truss length is 82 meters (269 ft). Just east of the bridge the Eastern Østfold Line branches off at the now disused Hafslund Station.

=== Original bridge ===
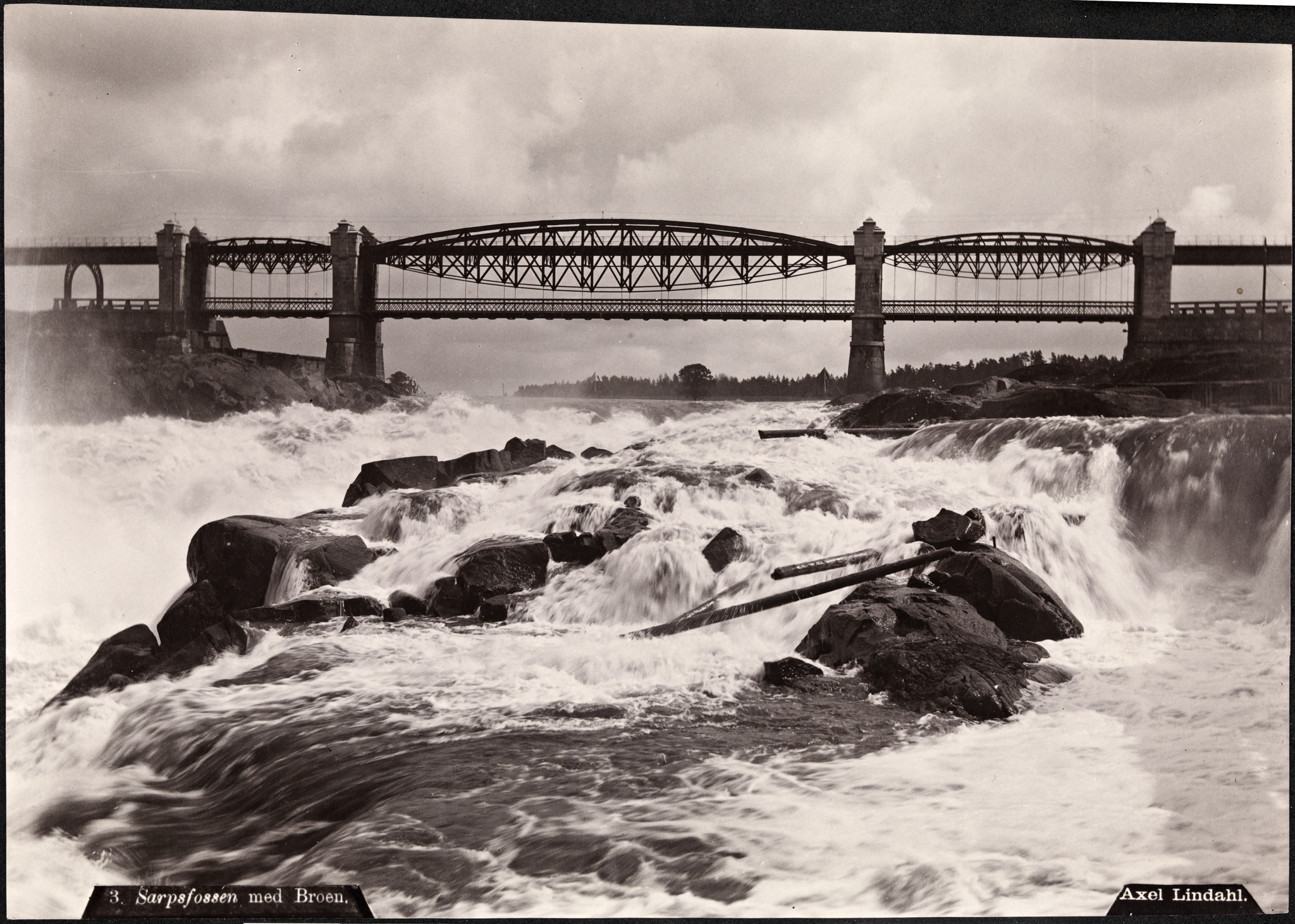
The first rail and road bridge

The first bridge was a suspension bridge with two brick pillars. The original road bridge was 91 meters (299 ft) long between the landfall. The main span measured 47 meters (154 ft), while the smaller ones measured 23 and 15 meters (75 and 49 ft). There were four cables each made up of wrought iron. The bridge was dimensioned to withstand a load of 320 kilograms per deck-meter. The bridge had an overall weight of about 360 tonnes.

The railway component made the original bridge into a multilevel structure. The bridge then had four brick pillars, which carried three truss spans. The tracks were 6.9 meters (23 ft) above the roadbed. With viaducts the railway bridge reach a length of 239 meters (784 ft).

== History ==
=== First road bridge ===
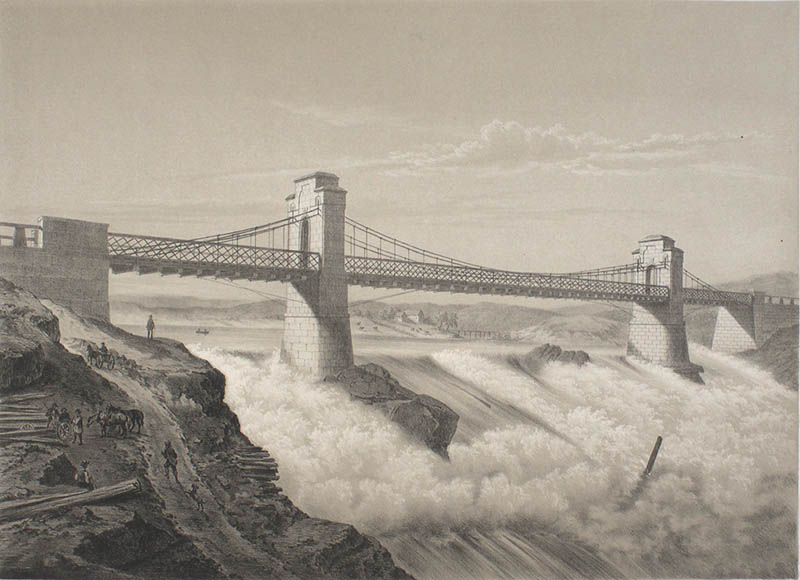
The 1854 bridge

At the start of the 19th century the King's Road through Østfold passed through Hafslund and then continued along the southeastern bank of the river to Fredrikstad. A ferry service was offered at Sandesund, near the current location of the Sannesund Bridge. The ferry service was both expensive and dangerous, and it was not uncommon for there to be lethal accidents. The new Highway Act of 28 July 1824 stipulated that the road from Torsbekken to Tune Church did not have sufficient standard, and the town magistrate demanded in 1841 that a new road be built. It was in relation to this that the first demands for a bridge across Glomma was proposed, initially between Buene and Dombergodden. Soon a counterproposal was made, to place the bridge over the falls. An argument against this was that the bridge could be damaged if a lock burst further up along Glomma and there came an uncontrolled rush of lumber. However, the bridge across Sarpefossen would give shorter access from the areas east of the town, and it would be shorter, cheaper have better carrying capacity.

Proposals for state funding were issued by the municipality in 1844. Not until five years later was a detailed design of a bridge made, by Christian Vilhelm Bergh. The Engineering Brigade protested and wanted the entire bridge between landfalls to be built with a single span. This was rejected by the road authorities as it would more than double the construction costs. It was estimated to cost 36,000 Norwegian speciedaler, of which 25,000 was for the bridge and the rest for the auxiliary roads and administration. State grants were approved on 30 June 1851.

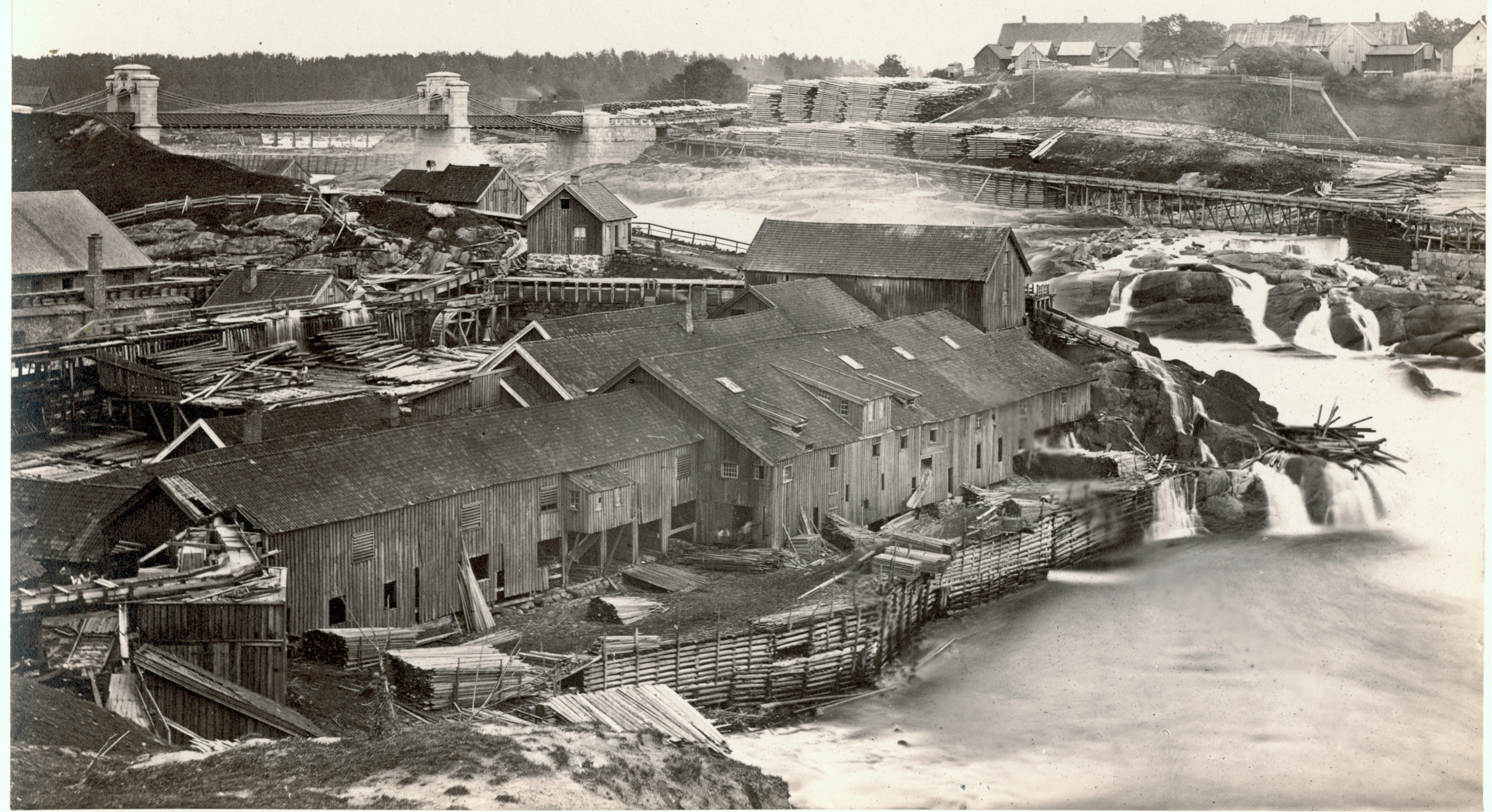
Borregaard with the bridge in the background

Only two companies bid for the ironworks contract, and the contract was awarded to Fritzøe Jernverk. Construction started in February 1952. A main concern was that there were not enough stonemasons in the area, causing several new ones to be trained while others were brought in from Sweden. Work on the foundations started in the late winter of 1852, when the water level was the lowest. The first attempt failed, with river flooding over the work and postponing construction a further year. The second attempt was made the following winter, with the workers having a three-month window in which the pillars needed to be built high enough that the spring floods would not enclose them. The second attempt succeeded. Construction was completed by February 1854. There were no serious accidents during the works, and the bridge was officially opened on 25 February.

=== Arrival of the railway ===
Parliament approved the construction of the Østfold Line in 1874. With this there arose a local debate as to where the railway should cross Glomma. The Railway Directorate initially proposed that the line cross at Sandesund. This was met with near unison local opposition, as it would cut through the plant at Borregård and the town. An agreement was thereby made where they railway was allowed to use the foundations of the road bridge and build the railway bridge on top. The town offered the railway the bridge for free on condition that it was rebuilt in a manner which allowed the road traffic to continue. The county would retain the responsibility for maintaining the road surface.

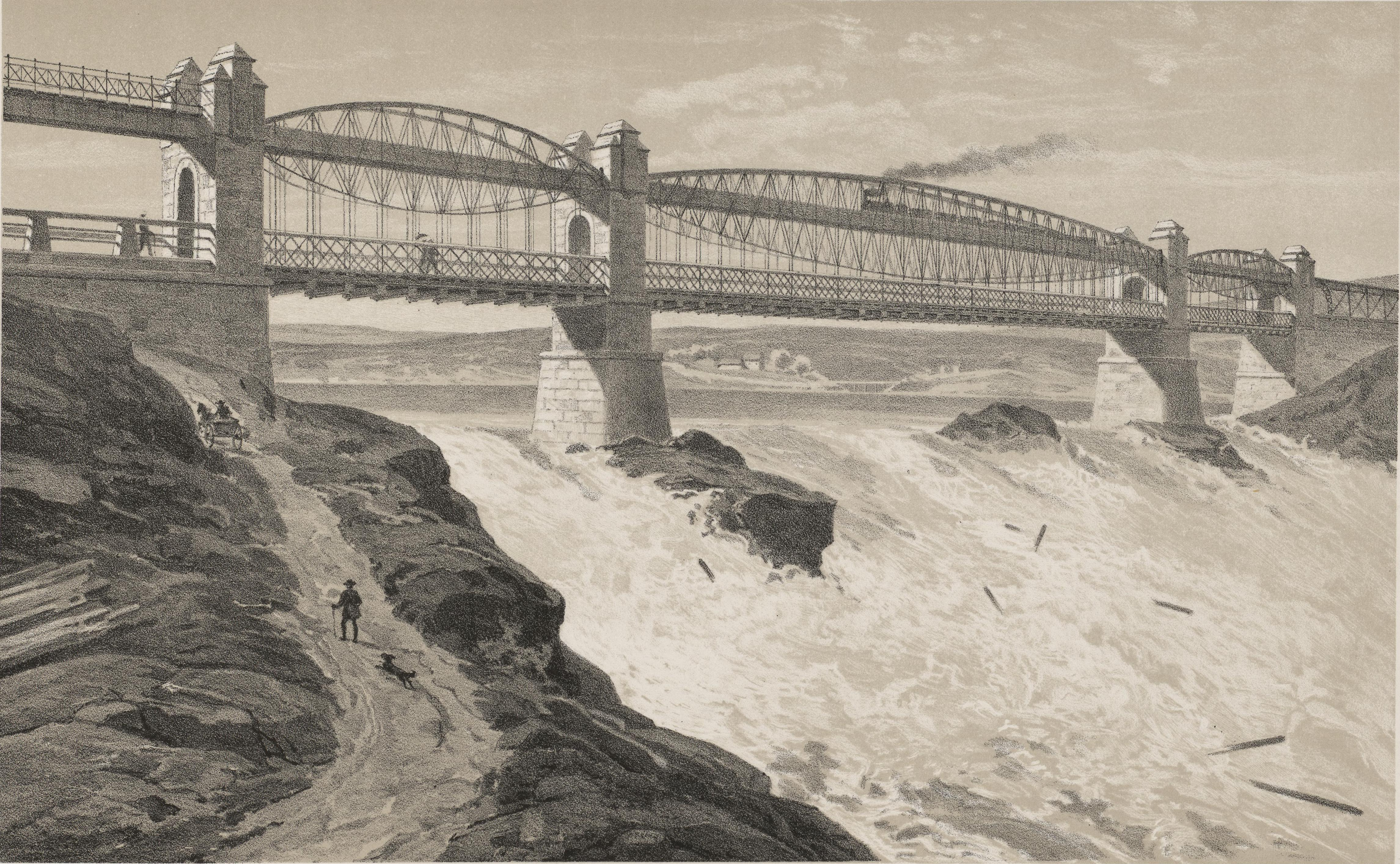
The twin-deck railway and road bridge was completed in 1879

When the construction of the Østfold Line started, the responsibility for bridges and viaducts was placed at Axel Jacob Petersson. The Østfold Line was the first railway in Norway where all the major bridges were built with iron. Petersson started designing the railway river crossing in 1876. He decided that the best alternative was to build the railway bridge on top of the road bridge. The two pillars were heightened and two new pillars were built at the landing on each side. A truss section was thereafter placed between each of the pillars. The suspension cables were removed and the road bridge was supported with vertical cables from the trusses.

The ironworks were delivered by Bergheim & Lecoq of Belgium and weighed 320 tonnes. Construction commenced on 6 February 1877 and cost 265,270 Norwegian kroner. This included viaducts on both sides to gain sufficient height. The lower road section was opened for traffic already on 29 March 1877. The railway section was not in revenue use until the entire Østfold Line opened on 2 January 1879.

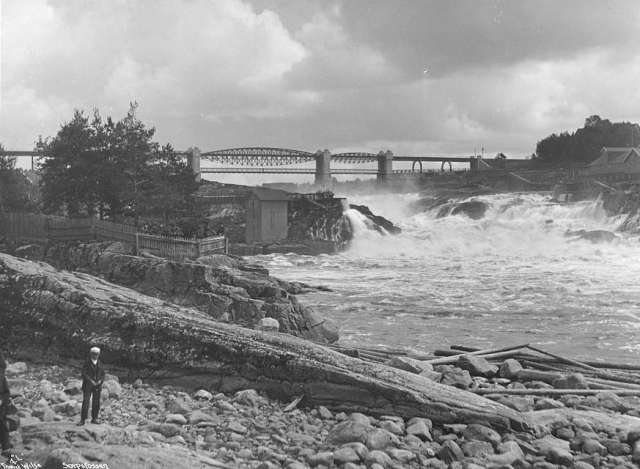
The bridge and the falls during the 1880s

Hafslund expanded its intake canal under the eastern span in 1898, weakening the eastern pillar. This caused cracks in the abutment and the bridge was closed for improvements.

=== Second bridge ===
By the turn of the century it had become evident that the Østfold Line was undermentioned. It was the main railway heading south to Continental Europe and there was a steady demand that the line support faster passenger services and heavier freight trains. This resulted in a 1910 decision to upgrade all bridges along the line to support a heavier weight norm. The work was initially planned to be completed by 1919. The breakout of the First World War and later lack of funding delayed the plans with more than a decade. The last major work was the construction of a new bridge over Sarpefossen. While other bridges were needed to be strengthened, with was not a viable option for the Sarp Bridge. The first plans for a new bridge were completed in 1913, but the break-out of the war place new project on hold. Planning was not taken up again before in 1922.

Meanwhile, the Public Roads Administration was increasingly dissatisfied with the road section. It was not wide enough to allow two cars to meet. The bridge was also not strong enough to support the weight of increased traffic. The Norwegian State Railways wanted to build a bridge with double track, but there was not sufficient funding for this. This would allow both branches of the railway to have each their track from Hafslund to Sarpsborg Station. The next idea was to build a second bridge next to the first, also carrying one road lane at a lower level and a track at an upper level. The two agencies were not able to agree on the distribution of the costs. The railways could in the end not wait longer and decided to build their own bridge and leave the old one free of the charge to the Public Roads Administration.

NSB first considered a stone bridge, but found that the bedrock on the Hafslund side was not stable enough. They therefore opted for a steel truss bridge situated on upstream of the original bridge. The bridge was designed by Hans Tønnesen. It received a deck which supported a single track, but the foundations were built to support double track. The plans were approved in December 1929. Work on the foundations started immediately and by November 1930 the first bridge elements were being installed. These were designed by Erik Ruuds Mekaniske Verksted. The main truss had to be put together on side and then lifted up from the waterfalls, and event that took place on 17 March 1931. The bridge was finished on 1 May 1931 and the first train ran across it on 9 May. The new railway bridge cost 716,000 kroner.

Hafslund Station was established in 1931, with the introduction of multiple units on the Eastern Østfold Line. Originally a flag stop, it was situated just east of the bridge. The interchange between the two lines was from 1933 remotely controlled from Sarpsborg Station, as the first remotely controlled interchange in the country. The Østfold Line was electrified during the late 1930s and early 1940s. The section between Sarpsborg and Halden, and thus the Sarp Bridge, was powered up on 11 November 1940.

Once the railway bridge was completed, the Norwegian Public Roads Administration took over the former bridge and rebuilt it wider and stronger. The entire superstructure and steel parts of the pillars were demolished. The brick gates were widened. The auxiliary road past Tarris was placed on a viaduct leading to the bridge. To avoid hindering traffic on the river, construction was prolonged. A temporary wooden bridge was erected in 1936 and remained for two years, until the new road bridge opened in 1938.

=== Explosion and new road bridge ===
During the 1940 Norwegian Campaign against the invading German forces, both the Sarp Bridge and many other bridges were fitted explosives with so they could be blown up to block German advances. On 14 April 1940 a ten-year-old boy had played with some wires he had found on the Grøte Bridge and accidentally blown up one of the pillars. In response to the incident, Police Chief Hans Olsen the following day ordered the town's engineer office to remove the explosives from the Sarp Bridge. An engineer and three fire fighters first removed the explosives from the railway bridge. This was easy as the wires had already been removed. They then attempted to do the same on the road bridge. The explosives were detonated by mistake and the entire main span collapsed into the river. Two of the fire fighters and a man working at the dam were killed in the accident. On the orders of the German occupying authorities, a temporary ferry service was established between Sandesund and Borge using one of the port's vessels. It transported about 18,000 vehicles in four months.

The lower part of the trusses on the railway bridge were used to make a temporary pathway for pedestrians and bicycles. A temporary new road bridge was completed on 8 October. Full repairs of the road bridge was completed in 1943.

A bicycle and pedestrian bridge was completed in 1977.

== Future ==
The Norwegian National Rail Administration is working on plans to build a new high-speed railway line through Østfold as part of the InterCity Triangle project. The new line to Sarpsborg is scheduled for completion by 2026, while it is scheduled to reach Halden by 2030. As the existing lines are presumed to be kept, the railway will need a new bridge over Sarpefossen with three tracks. At the same time National Road 118 is being considered expanded to four lanes. Several alternative crossings of Glomma than at Sarpefossen have been considered, but in 2014 the municipal council went forward with an extension of the existing crossing. As there is limited space, the new road and railway right-of-ways are being planned together. An alternative is to build the road as a ring road crossing from Hafslundøy to Opsund.

== Bibliography ==
- Bakken, Erling (1995). Sarpsborg brannvesen 1895–1995 (in Norwegian). Sarpsborg: Sarpsborg Municipality.
- Bjerke, Thor; Holom, Finn (2004). Banedata 2004 (in Norwegian). Hamar / Oslo: Norwegian Railway Museum / Norwegian Railway Club. ISBN 82-90286-28-7.
- Coldevin, Axel (1950). Sarpsborg gjennom hundre år 1839–1939 (in Norwegian). Sarpsborg: Saprsborg Municipality.
- Langård, Geir-Widar; Ruud, Leif-Harald (2005). Sydbaneracer og Skandiapil – Glimt fra Østfoldbanen gjennom 125 år (in Norwegian). Oslo: Norwegian Railway Club. ISBN 978-82-90286-29-8.
- Nygård, Bjarne (1944). Sarpsfossen i dikt og virkelighet (in Norwegian). Oslo: Tell Forlag.
