= Sunningen =

- Location within Västra Götaland Location within Sweden
- Coordinates: 58°20′N 11°50′E
- Country: Sweden
- Province: Bohuslän
- County: Västra Götaland County
- Municipality: Uddevalla Municipality

Area
  - Total: 0.80 km^{2} (0.31 sq mi)

Population (31 December 2010)
  - Total: 742
  - Density: 926/km^{2} (2,400/sq mi)
- Time zone: UTC+1 (CET)
  - Summer (DST): UTC+2 (CEST)

Sunningen is a locality situated in Uddevalla Municipality, Västra Götaland County, Sweden with 742 inhabitants in 2010.
