= Byfjorden (Bohuslän) =

Swedish fjord

Coordinates: 58°19′45″N 11°52′00″E

Byfjorden is a fjord in Bohuslän that connects into Havstensfjorden in the west. Uddevalla is located at the innermost part of the fjord, which is also where the fjord connects to Bäveån. Uddevalla Harbour takes up most of the fjord’s northeastern coast, while Unda Camping and Sunningen is to the northwest. A walk and bike path called Strandpromenaden follows the fjords southern coast from central Uddevalla to Lindesnäs and Rödön via the sea resort Gustavsberg. Only one road crosses the fjord, that being European Route E6 across the Uddevalla Bridge.

In late August 2004, a male narwhal found his way into Byfjorden. He made national headlines and got named Valder. In early September the same year, Valder was found dead. His skeleton got preserved and can now be found at the Natural History Museum in Gothenburg.

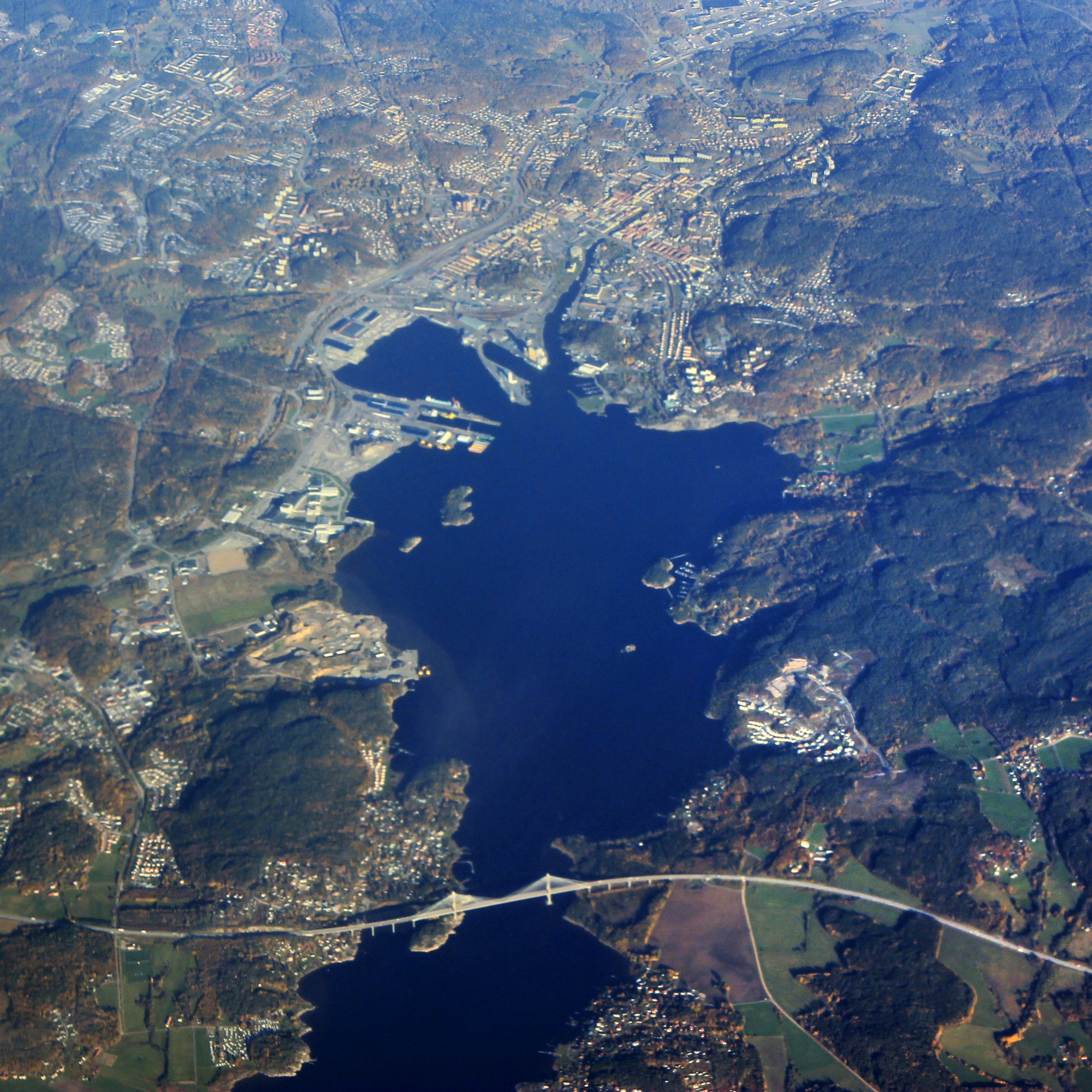
Byfjorden as seen from the west.
