= Såner =

- Village
- Interactive map of Såner
- Coordinates: 59°31′55″N 10°44′57″E
- Time zone: UTC+01:00 (CET)

Såner is a parish and village in Vestby municipality, Akershus county, Norway.

== The name ==
The parish is named after the old farm Såner (Norse Sánar), since the first church was built there. The name is probably the plural form of an old rivername (see under Son).

Until 1921 the name was written "Saaner".

== Citations ==
- Godal, Anne Marit (ed.). "Såner". Store norske leksikon. 10 March 2009. Web. 21 June 2011.
