= Uddevalla Municipality =

Uddevalla Municipality Uddevalla kommun
- Municipality
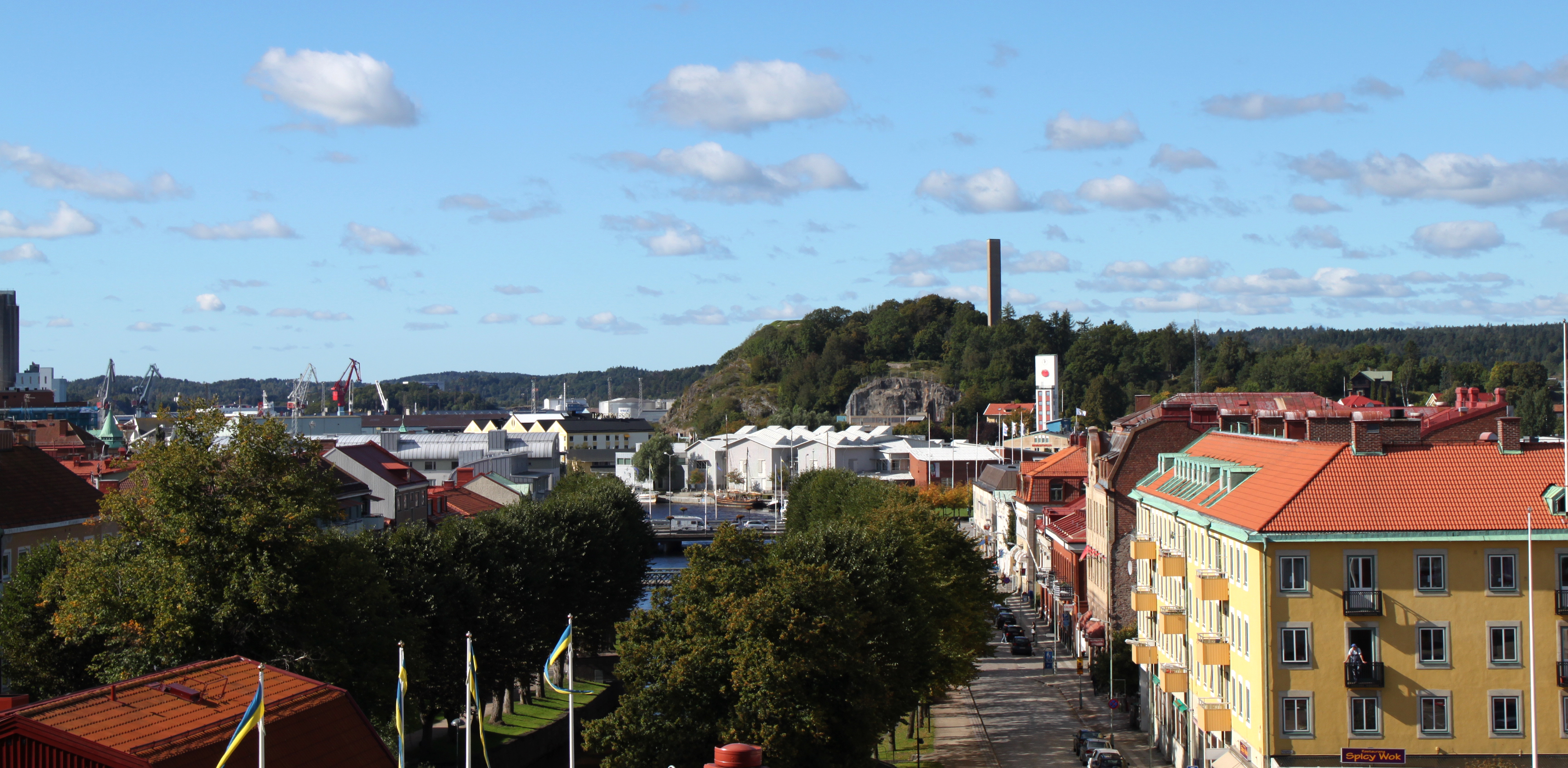

- Coat of arms

- Coordinates: 58°21′N 11°55′E
- Country: Sweden
- County: Västra Götaland County
- Seat: Uddevalla

Area
  - Total: 733.03 km^{2} (283.02 sq mi)
  - Land: 637.69 km^{2} (246.21 sq mi)
  - Water: 95.34 km^{2} (36.81 sq mi)
- Area as of 1 January 2014.

Population (30 June 2025)
  - Total: 56,974
  - Density: 89.344/km^{2} (231.40/sq mi)
- Time zone: UTC+1 (CET)
  - Summer (DST): UTC+2 (CEST)
- ISO 3166 code: SE
- Province: Bohuslän
- Municipal code: 1485
- Website: www.uddevalla.se

Uddevalla Municipality (Swedish: Uddevalla kommun) is a municipality in Västra Götaland County in western Sweden. Its seat is located in the city of Uddevalla.

The present municipality was created in 1971 when the City of Uddevalla (which had absorbed the rural municipality Bäve in 1945) was amalgamated with the surrounding municipalities Forshälla, Lane-Ryr, Ljungskile, Skredsvik and parts of Skaftö.

== Localities ==
- Ammenäs
- Fagerhult
- Herrestad
- Hogstorp
- Ljungskile
- Sunningen
- Uddevalla (seat)

== Demographics ==
This is a demographic table based on Uddevalla Municipality's electoral districts in the 2022 Swedish general election sourced from SVT's election platform, in turn taken from SCB official statistics.

In total there were 57,031 residents, including 43,062 Swedish citizens of voting age. 45.7% voted for the left coalition and 52.3% for the right coalition.

Location	Residents	Citizen adults	Left vote	Right vote	Employed	Swedish parents	Foreign heritage	Income SEK	Degree
Location			%	%					
Ammenäs-Sund	1,871	1,402	34.4	64.9	89	91	9	33,368	53
Berg-Simmersröd	1,620	1,217	45.5	52.7	84	90	10	27,348	60
Bleket-S Dalaberg	1,838	1,339	56.8	40.3	81	61	39	24,846	37
Bokenäs-Dragsmark	1,572	1,252	43.3	55.7	86	92	8	27,543	40
Boxhult-N Unnaröd	1,807	1,373	54.1	44.7	78	70	30	24,075	41
Dalaberg-N Hovhult	1,819	917	63.9	17.6	46	16	84	10,604	20
Dramsvik-Forshälla	1,630	1,255	38.2	61.0	88	93	7	30,000	41
Fasseröd	1,541	1,182	48.5	51.0	87	77	23	28,581	44
Hedegärde-Vännerberg	1,928	1,378	48.4	49.1	77	76	24	24,936	39
Helenedal-N Uddevalla	1,733	1,214	58.4	38.6	73	57	43	23,865	37
Hovhult	1,707	1,152	54.7	38.0	65	47	53	18,997	28
Håljuteberget	1,597	1,354	49.6	48.7	73	76	24	23,104	38
Hälle-Skafteröd	1,570	1,191	47.8	50.2	87	88	12	27,048	61
Högås-Sundsandvik	1,660	1,267	41.7	57.6	89	90	10	28,927	39
Hönseberget	1,622	1,295	46.9	50.7	71	72	28	21,374	33
Kampenhof-Strömstadsv.	1,310	1,125	47.4	50.6	75	69	31	23,292	31
Kapelle	1,887	1,484	45.5	53.2	83	87	13	27,938	44
Karlsruhe-Elseberg	1,639	1,235	47.0	50.7	76	73	27	24,716	37
Kissleberg-Smedseröd	1,776	1,290	43.0	56.6	87	87	13	28,903	43
Kurveröd	1,390	1,034	45.5	53.6	86	91	9	30,069	48
Källdal-Misteröd	2,154	1,558	37.7	61.6	89	89	11	32,633	51
Lane-Ryr	1,601	1,218	34.3	64.8	88	94	6	28,722	30
Lyckorna-Grinneröd	1,939	1,523	35.6	63.0	85	92	8	29,729	51
Ridhuset-Folkets park	1,644	1,452	49.3	49.9	79	81	19	22,754	35
Skogslyckan	1,600	1,105	51.2	44.2	61	54	46	17,028	26
Skredsvik-Hogstorp	1,709	1,285	37.9	61.0	87	89	11	28,700	34
Stenbacken-Karlsberg	1,577	1,247	41.5	57.1	78	80	20	24,614	39
Tureborg-Vadbacken	2,005	1,155	59.6	33.0	55	34	66	14,960	30
Ulvesund-Resteröd	1,682	1,279	48.1	50.1	83	87	13	27,697	52
Unneröd-Ramneröd	1,452	1,146	51.8	46.4	68	70	30	20,141	31
Utby-Lanesund	1,762	1,421	38.7	60.7	87	92	8	30,989	45
Walkesborg-Bohusgården	1,668	1,403	48.4	50.1	81	79	21	24,187	38
Äsperöd-Ängebacken	1,436	1,174	43.0	56.0	84	84	16	26,289	33
Österberget	1,285	1,140	45.7	53.0	84	85	15	26,342	41
Source: SVT
