= Vestby =

Vestby Municipality Vestby kommune
- Municipality
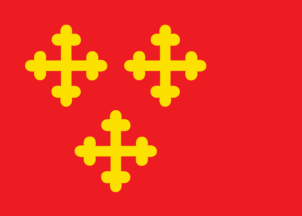
- Flag Coat of arms

- Akershus within Norway

- Vestby within Akershus
- Coordinates: 59°34′30″N 10°43′55″E
- Country: Norway
- County: Akershus
- District: Follo
- Administrative centre: Vestby

Government
  - Mayor (2015): Tom Anders Ludvigsen (Ap)

Area
  - Total: 134 km^{2} (52 sq mi)
  - Land: 134 km^{2} (52 sq mi)
  - Rank: #367 in Norway

Population (2006)
  - Total: 13,159
  - Rank: #84 in Norway
  - Density: 96/km^{2} (250/sq mi)
  - Change (10 years): ▲ +13.9%
- Demonym: Vestbysokning

Official language
  - Norwegian form: Bokmål
- Time zone: UTC+01:00 (CET)
  - Summer (DST): UTC+02:00 (CEST)
- ISO 3166 code: NO-3216
- Website: Official website

Vestby is a municipality in Akershus county, Norway. It is part of the Follo traditional region. The administrative centre of the municipality is the village of Vestby.

== General information ==
=== Name ===
The municipality (originally the parish) is named after the old Vestby farm (Old Norse: Vestbýr), since the first church was built here. The first element is vestr which means "west" and the last element is býr meaning "farm". The neighbouring farms have the names Østby ("eastern farm"), Sunnby ("southern farm"), and Nordby ("northern farm"); and they must all four be the parts of a bigger and older farm, whose name is now unknown.

=== Coat-of-arms ===
The coat-of-arms is from modern times. They were granted on 18 June 1982 and designed by Bjørn Linnestad. The arms show three gold bottony crosses on a red background, two over one. They represent the three original parishes in the municipality: Vestby, Garder, and Såner. At the same time they also represent the three natural harbors in the area: Emmerstad, Kjøvangen, and Sonskilen.

Number of minorities (1st and 2nd generation) in Vestby by country of origin in 2017
| Ancestry | Number |
|---|---|
| Poland | 377 |
| Sweden | 206 |
| Iraq | 129 |
| Somalia | 119 |
| Germany | 117 |
| Pakistan | 113 |
| Kosovo | 108 |
| Denmark | 104 |
| Vietnam | 99 |
| Philippines | 96 |

== History ==
Archaeological research in Hølen has confirmed that the area has been populated since about 2400 BC. There are various archeological finds in the area, such as the ones from the Bronze Age.

Many Norwegian emigrants went to America during the 1840s and later settled in the area of the present city of Westby, Wisconsin (named after general store owner and American Civil War Union soldier Ole T. Westby); a city which still has a mostly Norwegian American population.

Hølen became known for the production of timber. It became a lading place in the 17th century.

From the Renaissance until the 18th century, Son was an important harbour. On some Dutch maps from that time, the Oslofjord is called Zoon Water.

Vestby was established as a municipality on 1 January 1838 (see formannskapsdistrikt). The municipality and lading place of Hølen was merged with Vestby on 1 July 1943. The municipality and lading place of Son was merged with Vestby on 1 January 1964. (The lading place of Hvitsten in Vestby has never been a municipality of its own.)

== Geography ==
Vestby includes the villages Vestby, Hølen, Hvitsten, Garder, and Son. Recently urbanized areas are Randem, Pepperstad skog, and Sole skog. Randem is located north of the municipal centre, Vestby, and includes an industrial area. Pepperstad is located southwest of Vestby, by the road 155. Sole skog lies west of the centre. The village of Vestby has 5,424 inhabitants (2006). All the small towns together have over 13,000 inhabitants.

== Notable residents ==
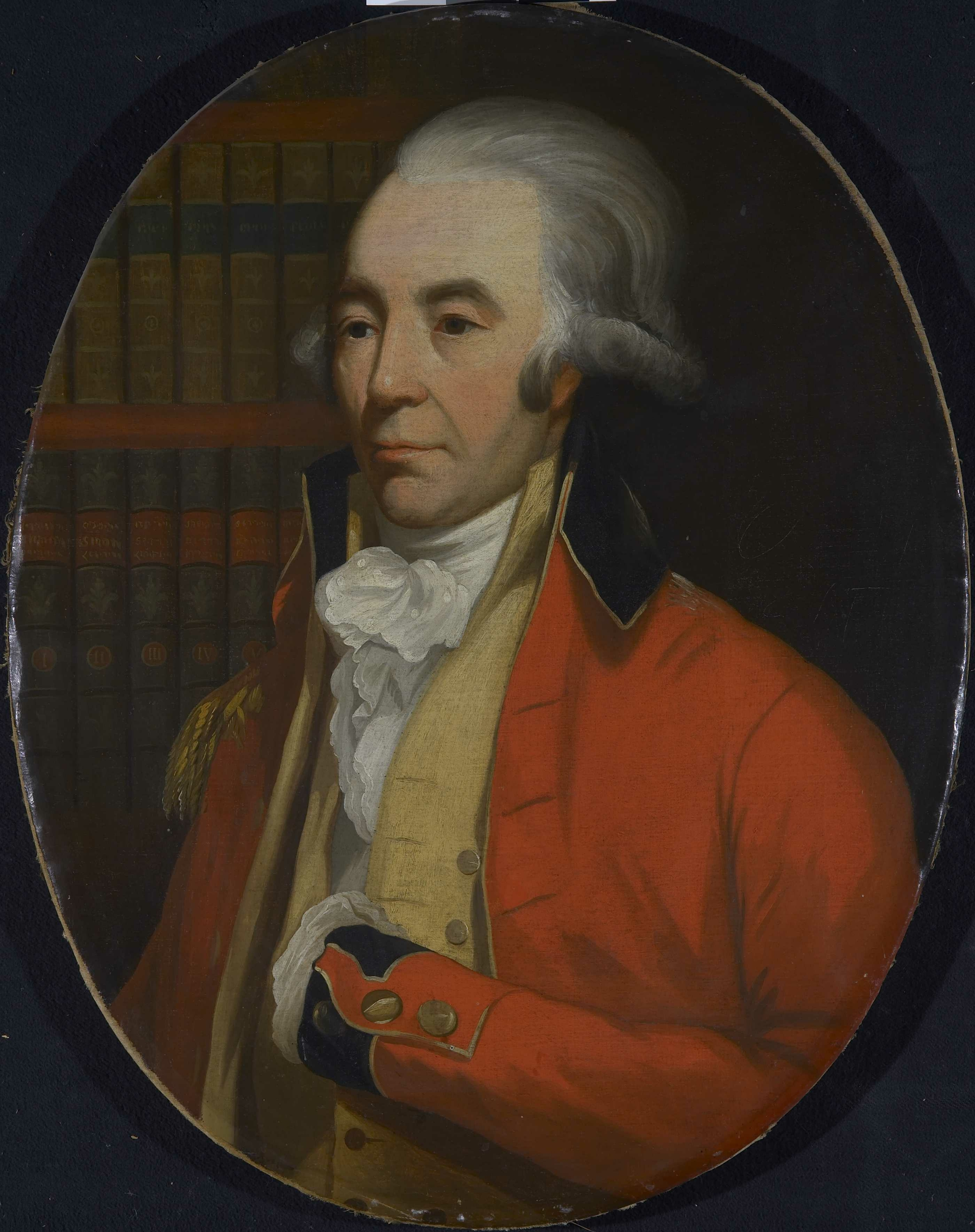
Ole Christopher Wessel

- Johan Herman Wessel (1742 in Vestby – 1785) Danish-Norwegian poet and playwright, used parody and satiric wit
- Ole Christopher Wessel (1744 in Vestby – 1794) a jurist, civil servant and landowner
- Caspar Wessel (1745 in Vestby – 1818) Danish–Norwegian mathematician and cartographer
- Erik Bodom (1829 in Vestby – 1879) a Norwegian landscape painter
- Oluf Wold-Torne (1867 in Vestby – 1919) painter of landscapes and still lifes
- Rudolf Olsen (1882 in Hvitsten – 1951) shipping magnate, CEO of Fred. Olsen & Co.
- Edith Roger (born 1922 in Vestby – 2023) a dancer, choreographer and stage director
- Bodil Cappelen (born 1930) a painter, textile artist and book illustrator; lives in Son
- Svend Wam (1946 in Son – 2017) a Norwegian film director
- Trond André Bolle (1968 in Vestby – 2010) a military officer of Norwegian Navy Special Operations Command
- Marit Fiane Grødum (born 1980 in Vestby) a footballer with over 150 club caps and 86 for Norway women
- Jørn Stubberud (born 1968) a bassist of the Norwegian band Mayhem

== International relations ==
=== Twin towns – Sister cities ===
Vestby is twinned with the following municipality:

- Vara, Västra Götaland, Sweden
