= Ljan =

Neighbourhood of Oslo, Norway

Coordinates: 59°50′N 10°47′E

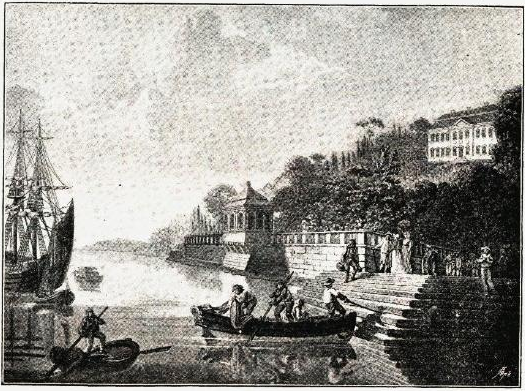
Old copperplate engraving from Ljan.

Ljan (Norwegian pronunciation: [jɑːn]) is a residential neighborhood in the borough Nordstrand in Oslo, Norway. It is located in the eastern rolling hillsides of the fjord Bunnefjorden. To the south Ljanselva which begins at Lutvann has its mouth, and where it runs through Liadalen at Ljan it also constitutes the border with borough Søndre Nordstrand. The number of inhabitants was about 3,500 in 2004. Ljan Church is known as one of the very few churches in Norway that was built in the 1930s in the Romanesque Revival style. The public beaches at Ljan are Hvervenbukta, Ljansbadet and Katten, and in addition there are a number of private bath houses along Mosseveien. The borders to the north and east are less obvious and drawn between the school circuits Ljan and Nordstrand. The name originates with an Old Norse river name Ljǫrn but the meaning has been lost to time.

== The old Ljan farms ==
Originally Ljan was an old farm first written about in 1308. After 1650 it was partitioned in three, Øvre Ljan (English: Upper Ljan), Nedre Ljan (English: Lower Ljan) and Stubljan, however, the two former were purchased by the owners of Stubljan and with the addition of the farm Hvitebjørn (English: White Bear) in Oppegård, they constituted the Ljan Estate (Norwegian: Ljansgodset).

Stubljan received its name from its first owner, Christopher Nilsson Stub. Peder Holter bought the farm in 1765 and had built the large main building at Hvervenbukta. Holter's widow, Madam Maren Juel and her second and third husbands, Ole Christopher Wessel and First Minister Marcus Gjøe Rosenkrantz then took over. Maren Juel and Rosenkrantz sold off the estate to Juel's niece, Gjertrud Maren Juel and her husband, Lars Ingier.

The main building was destroyed in a fire in 1913, and today only the foundations remain. Next to Ljansbrukveien the two old porter's lodges today contain handicraft stores run by local craftspeople, and the gazebo at Hvervenbukta beach harbors a cafe which is open during the summer.

== Geology ==
Ljan is located immediately south of the Oslo Graben with the ground being predominantly bedrock dating back to the Precambrian, i.e. 1 billion years old: mostly nutrient-poor gneiss with more nutrient-rich amphibolite interspersed in layers. Due to the erosion that took place for hundreds of millions of years, today's rock surface was deep inside the mountains that were originally formed. During the Permian (around 250 million years ago) comprehensive volcanism marked the entire Oslo Graben and caused faults to arise across the Oslo region. As Bundefjorden sank, the Oslo valley sank along a northern fault line along the steep Ekeberg slope which remained elevated. The main western fault line follows Bundefjorden from Sjømannsskolen, past Nordstrand and Ingierstrand and on to Moss. Two branches of this fault line also emerged as crack zones: one along Gjersjøen and Gjersjøelva, the other along Ljanselva. The Ljanselva crack can be followed further inland with one branch going to Klemetsrud, the second to Nøklevann and Lutvann.

The bedrock surface cracked up further still, also outside the main fault lines, exacerbated by erosion by water and ice. Looser accretions that had settled on top of the bedrock during the Cambrium, Ordovician and Silurian Periods eroded off during the following 200 million years, causing much of the bedrock to resurface. The final "molding" of the landscape of Ljan took place during the Quaternary Period—the recent 1½ million years—when the land was frozen under glaciers at least five times. Each time, when the ice melted, water seared into the thin fissures—weakness zones—that had originated in the three previous geological periods. At Ljan and neighboring Hauketo flat rock layers go horizontally, and this gave rise to the steep slope of the Ljanselva valley, Liadalen, as ice and water sheared straight down into the packed rock layers.

At the end of the last glacial period, about 10,000 years ago, the Ljan fissure and other dents in the terrain were filled with moraine debris. As the weight of the glacier lifted the land heaved. In fact, the land around the inner Oslofjord rose 200–220 meters. But before that had taken place, a fjord went up at Ljan to Hauketo, with a narrow inlet into the Lusetjern Valley at Holmlia.

As rivers moved the sediment back into the sea, clay soil heaped up at the Ljan fields (today Hundejordet and Hallagerjordet) because the mountain blocked the further movement, creating deep dents in the terrain where the soil accumulated. Here arable land remained up to the 45 meter contour line. Here, at Store Ljan, the first Ljan farm was cleared, followed by another, Stubljan, at Hvervenbukta.

Overall, the soil cover in the Ljan area is thin as almost all soils were washed away from the steep hills and hillsides. In many places naked rock protrudes. In valley hollows though, such as at Ljan Station, at Skredderjordet and Åsdalsveien, nutrient-rich soil with clay minerals appear. The clay soil can be quite stiff and heavy, but it is also mixed with a considerable amount of sand particles.

== Notable people ==
- Jens Christian Hauge
