= Gjersjøelva =

River in Norway

Coordinates: 59°50′N 10°46′E

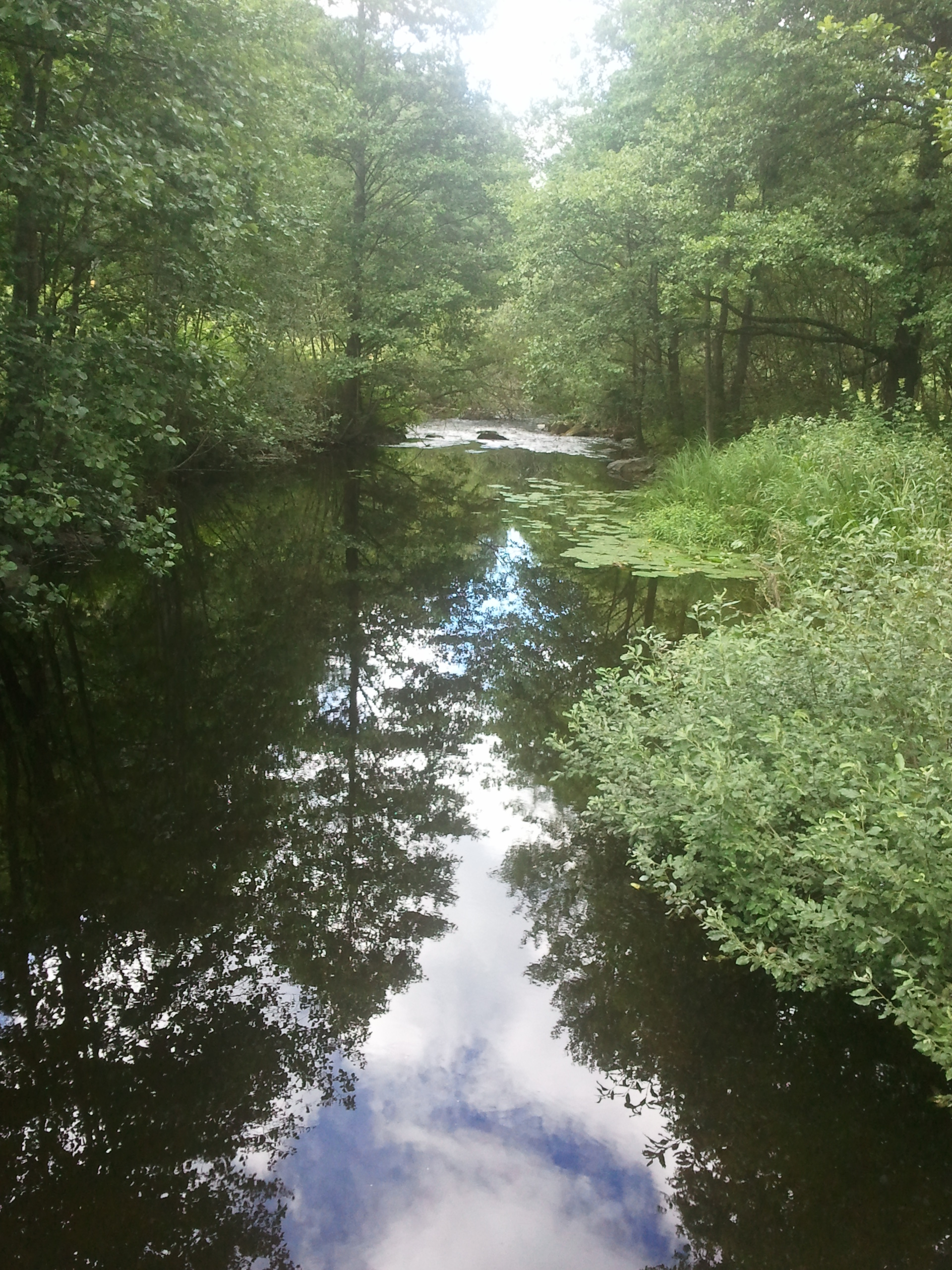
Gjersjøelva at Hvitebjørn

Gjersjøelva (former Hvitebjørnselva) is a river in the municipality of Nordre Follo in Akershus county, Norway. It flows from Gjersjøen and mouth into Bunnefjorden near Hvervenbukta, a total fall of 40 metres (130 ft). The last part of the river forms the border between Akershus and Oslo. Gjersjøelva had one of the first saw mills in Norway, from the 16th century.
