= Caspar Wessel =

Danish–Norwegian mathematician and cartographer

- Born: 8 June 1745; Vestby, Denmark–Norway (now Norway)
- Died: 25 March 1818 (aged 72); Copenhagen, Denmark
- Education: University of Copenhagen
- Known for: Complex numbers Complex plane Vectors
- Partner: Cathrine Elisabeth Brinck f. Müller
- Awards: Knight of the Order of the Dannebrog
- Scientific career
- Fields: Mathematics

Caspar Wessel (8 June 1745 – 25 March 1818) was a Danish–Norwegian mathematician and cartographer. In 1799, Wessel was the first person to describe the geometrical interpretation of complex numbers as points in the complex plane and vectors.

== Biography ==
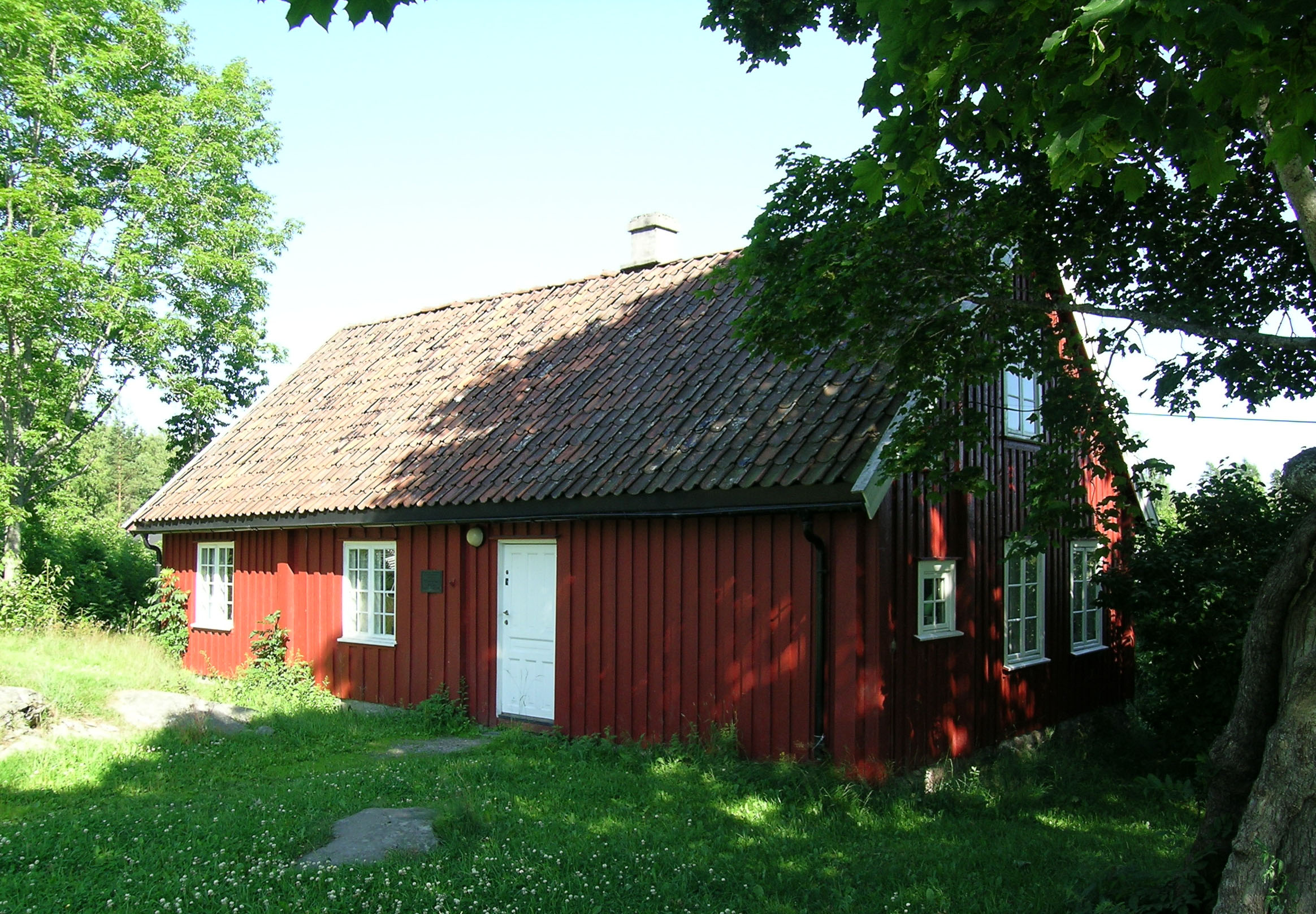
Wesselstua in Vestby, where Caspar and his brothers grew up

Wessel was born in Jonsrud, Vestby, Akershus in Norway to pastor Jonas Wessel (1707–1785) and Helene Marie Schumacher (1715–1789). Helene came from Drammen and was of Griffenfeldts heritage. Growing up in Wesselstuen in Vestby he was one of thirteen children in the family. His brothers include Johan Herman Wessel and Ole Christopher Wessel. Wessel was the grandnephew of the nobleman Peter Tordenskjold, brother-in-law of Maren Juel and the great-great-great-grandfather to the famous radio engineer Jan Wessel.

In 1763, having completed secondary school at Oslo Cathedral School, he went to Denmark for further studies. He attended the University of Copenhagen to study law, but due to financial pressures, could do so for only a year. To survive, he became an assistant land surveyor to his brother and they worked on the Royal Danish Academy of Sciences and Letters' topographical survey of Denmark. This was not enough, however, and he took on extra work as a cartographer. He worked as a surveyor for the rest of his life, stopping only for a sabbatical year in 1778 to finish his law degree. By 1798 Wessel had risen to the supervisory role of Royal Inspector of Surveying.

The mathematical aspect of surveying led him to exploring the geometrical significance of complex numbers. His fundamental paper, Om directionens analytiske betegning (On the Analytical Representation of Direction), was presented in 1797 to the Royal Danish Academy of Sciences and Letters. Since it was in Danish and published in a journal rarely read outside of Denmark, it went unnoticed for nearly a century. The same results were independently rediscovered by Jean-Robert Argand in 1806 and Carl Friedrich Gauss in 1831.

"It is now Norway's cause to do what should be done, that this strange Man's Memory may be brought forth by Oblivion and his Name find its proper place before the History of Mathematics."

— Sophus Lie

It was first when a Danish student wrote a doctoral dissertation on "Danish mathematics in the 18th century" that the universal significance of Wessel was brought up. While the student didn't realize the contribution by himself, the supervisors did. The dissertation created a great uproar and resulted in a front-page article in Dagbladet and Sophus Lie taking action to raise awareness of Wessel. In fact, Lie wrote in the article that "It is now Norway's cause to do what should be done, that this strange Man's Memory may be brought forth by Oblivion and his Name find its proper place before the History of Mathematics."

One of the more prominent ideas presented in On the Analytical Representation of Direction was that of vectors. Even though this was not Wessel's main intention with the publication, he felt that a geometrical concept of numbers, with length and direction, was needed. Wessel's approach on addition was: "Two straight lines are added together, when one joins them together so that one begins where the other one ends, and next one draws a straight line from the first to the last point of the joined lines, and takes this to be their sum". This is the same idea as used today in summing vectors.

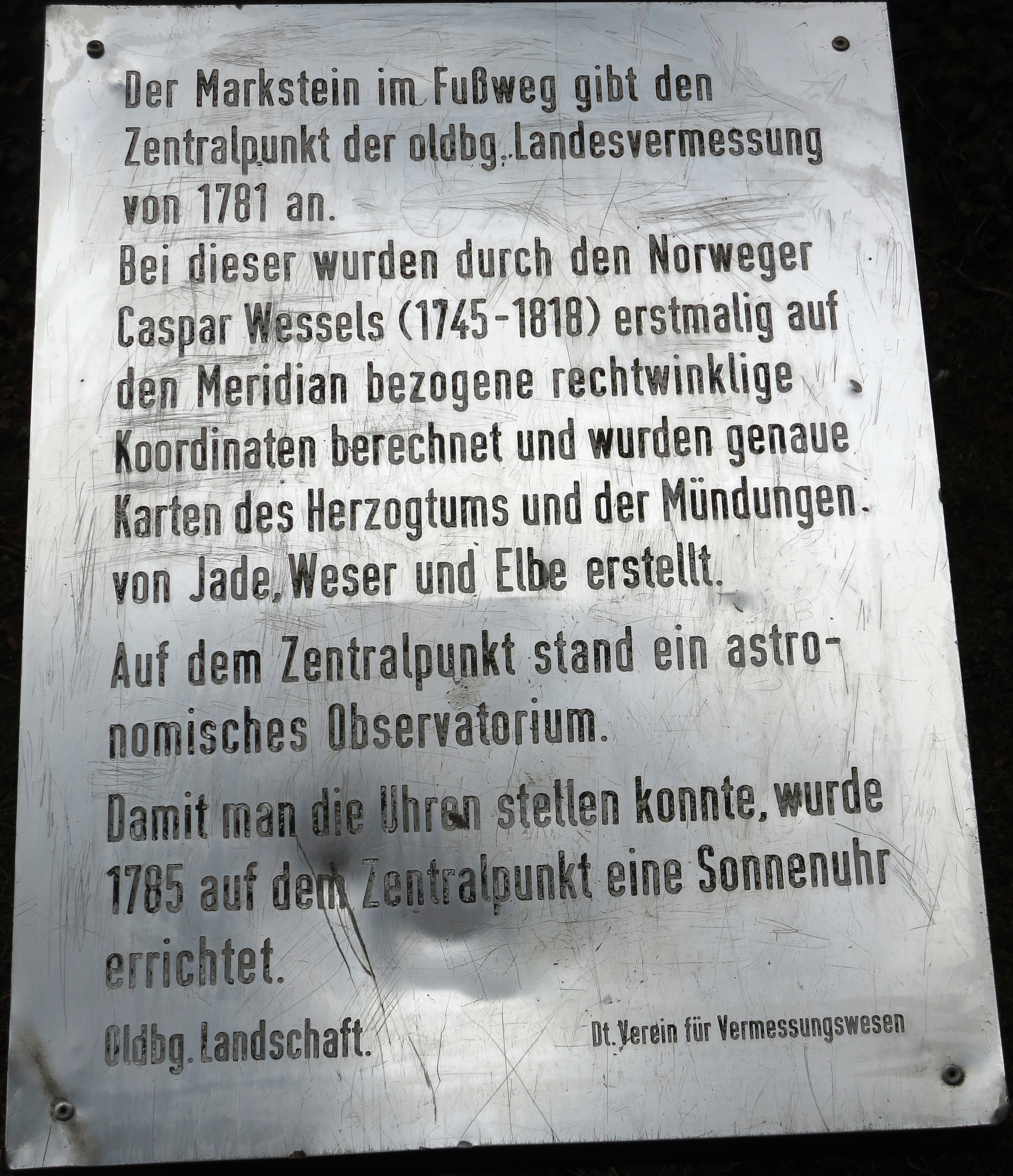
Memorial plaque of Wessel in Oldenburg, Germany

The importance of Wessel's contribution to the idea of a complex number as a point in the complex plane is today universally recognised. His paper was re-issued in French translation in 1897, and in English in 1999 as On the analytic representation of direction (eds. Branner & Lützen).

From 1764 to 1805, Wessel participated in the survey of Denmark, Schleswig, Holstein and the Duchy of Oldenburg. His map of Schleswig-Holstein was requested by Napoleon Bonaparte.

=== Personal relations ===
Wessel had a modest and quiet personality, he was described by his brother Johan Herman as "He draws maps and reads the law. He's as diligent as I am lazy". No portraits of Wessel seem to have survived.

In 1780 he married Cathrine Elisabeth Brinck f. Müller in Copenhagen.

On 1 July 1815, Wessel was made a knight of the Order of the Dannebrog for his contributions to surveying; the cross of the Order of the Dannebrog was presented to him at the Royal Palace of Amalienborg on 4 August 1815.

== Sources ==
- A Source Book in Mathematic by David Eugene Smith has "essential" passages of "Om directionens analytiske betegning" translated into English (see page 55).
