= Johan Herman Wessel =

Danish-Norwegian poet, satirist and playwright

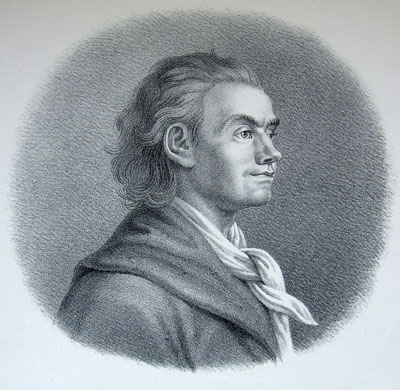
Johan Herman Wessel from Berømte danske Mænd og Kvinder by J. P. Trap. 1868

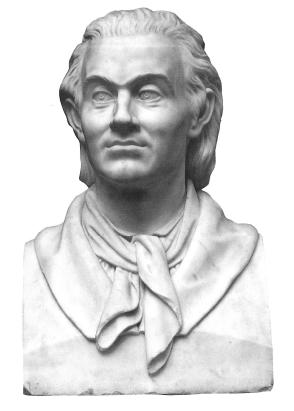
Bust of Johan Herman Wessel by Julius Middelthun at Nasjonalgalleriet

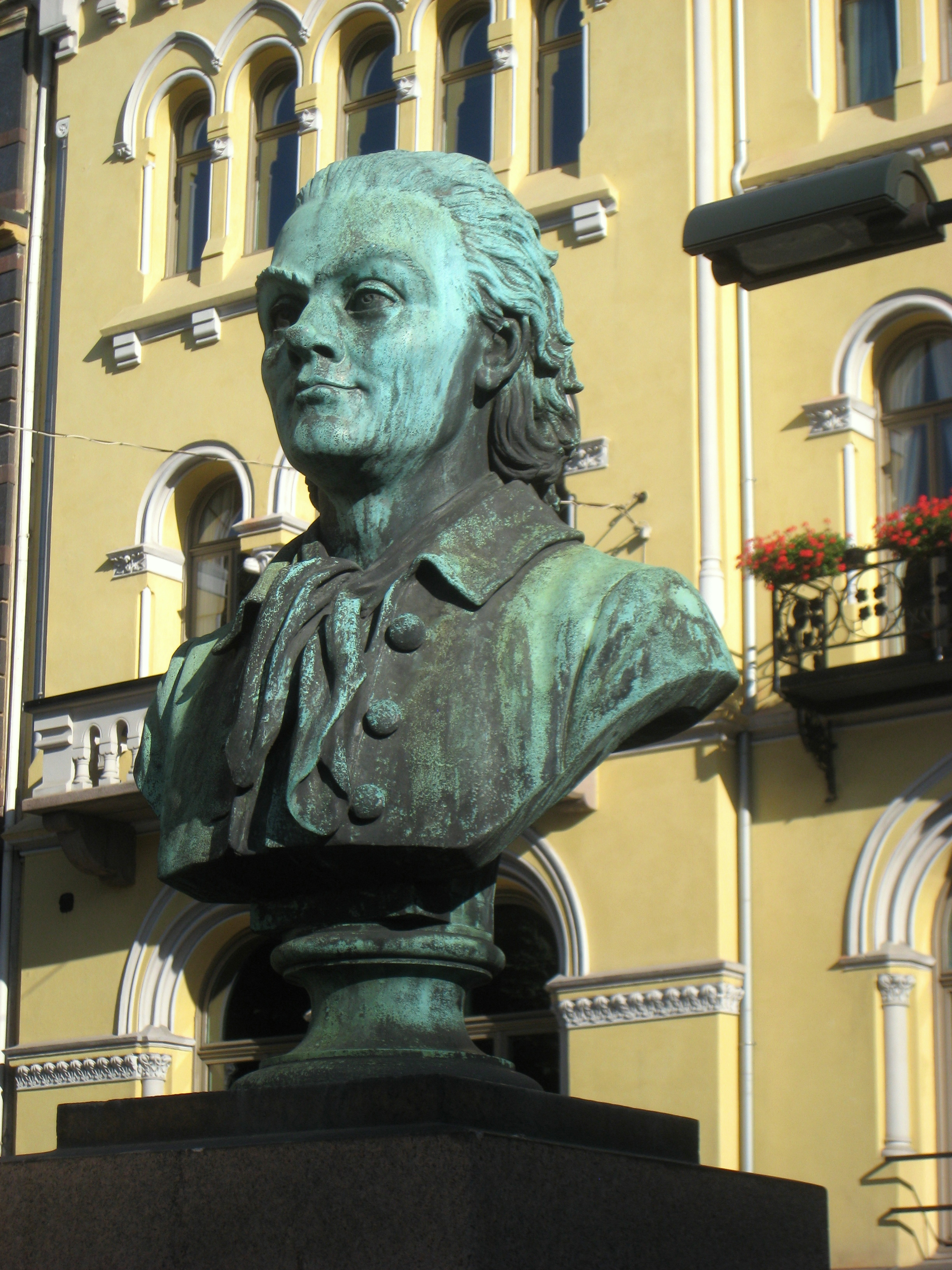
Bust of Johan Herman Wessel at Wessels plass in Oslo

Johan Herman Wessel (6 October 1742 – 29 December 1785) was an 18th-century Danish-Norwegian poet, satirist and playwright. His written work was characterized by the use of parody and satiric wit.

== Biography ==
Wessel was born and raised at Vestby in Akershus, Norway. He was the son of Jonas Wessel (1707–1785) and Helene Maria Schumacher (1715–1789). His father was a parish priest. He was one of thirteen children in the family. His younger brothers included mathematician Caspar Wessel (1745–1818) and jurist Ole Christopher Wessel (1744–1794). His sister-in-law was landowner Maren Juel (1749–1815) and naval hero Peter Tordenskjold (1690–1720) was his great uncle.

He entered Oslo Cathedral School in 1757 followed by the University of Copenhagen in 1761. At the university, he studied foreign languages. He later made a living principally as a tutor and translator. He lived most of his somewhat bohemian life in Copenhagen, dependent on casual work and weakened by bad health and drinking. Wessel became the admired centre of The Norwegian Society (Norske Selskab) a grouping of Norwegian literary figures cultivating their national identity in Copenhagen, and writing in classical metres.

== Personal life ==
In 1780, he married Anna Catharia Bukier (1748–1813). They were the parents of one son, Jonas Wessel who was born in 1781. The marriage suffered from his alcoholism, depression and inability as a provider. Johan Herman Wessel died at age 43 in Copenhagen and was buried in the cemetery of Trinitatis Church.

== Works ==
Wessel's poems and plays are frequently satirical and humorous. His literary style is deliberate elaborate and digressive and at the same time elegant and witty. Another genre is the epigram that he mastered, especially his short, witty, impudent, precise and also self-ironic commemorative poems.

Wessel is known first of all for his many humorous and satiric verse tales referring to man's foolishness and injustice. Most notable is Smeden og Bageren ("The Smith and the Baker") about the only smith of a village who is pardoned for manslaughter since the village people need one, while a more superfluous baker is executed instead (there are two bakers, the village only needs one) in order to observe the rules that "life pays life".

In Herremanden ("The Squire") a man coming to Hell makes unpleasant discoveries of the origin of his own son while Hundemordet ("The Dog Murder") tells about wrangle about trivial things.

His satirical play Kierlighed uden Strømper ( Love without Stockings, 1772 – with epilogue, 1774 – ISBN 978-1-962461-08-5 ) is a generic parody of neoclassical tragedy; it takes place in a daily milieu of banal conflicts but observes the formal rules of "heroic language". It is still performed.

Another play Anno 7603 was written in 1781. It has a low literary value, and it has never been performed—it is held in such low esteem that it is often omitted from lists of his works —but it has some cult status since this is one of the first examples of time travel in fiction. The main characters, Leander and Julie, are moved by a fairy to a future (AD 7603) in which gender roles have been switched and only women are allowed to fight in the military.

The traditional restaurant Wesselstuen in Bergen, Norway features many decorations inspired by his works.

== See also ==
- Johannes Ewald and Johan Hermann Wessel Memorial

== Other sources ==
- Liv Bliksrud, Johan Herman Wessel og hans tid, Wesselakademiet, 2000. ISBN 82-92033-01-7 (Norwegian)
- Liv Bliksrud, Den smilende makten : Norske Selskab i København og Johan Herman Wessel, Aschehoug, 1999. ISBN 82-03-18146-5. (Norwegian)
