= Johannes Ewald =

Danish national dramatist, psalm writer and poet (1743–1781)

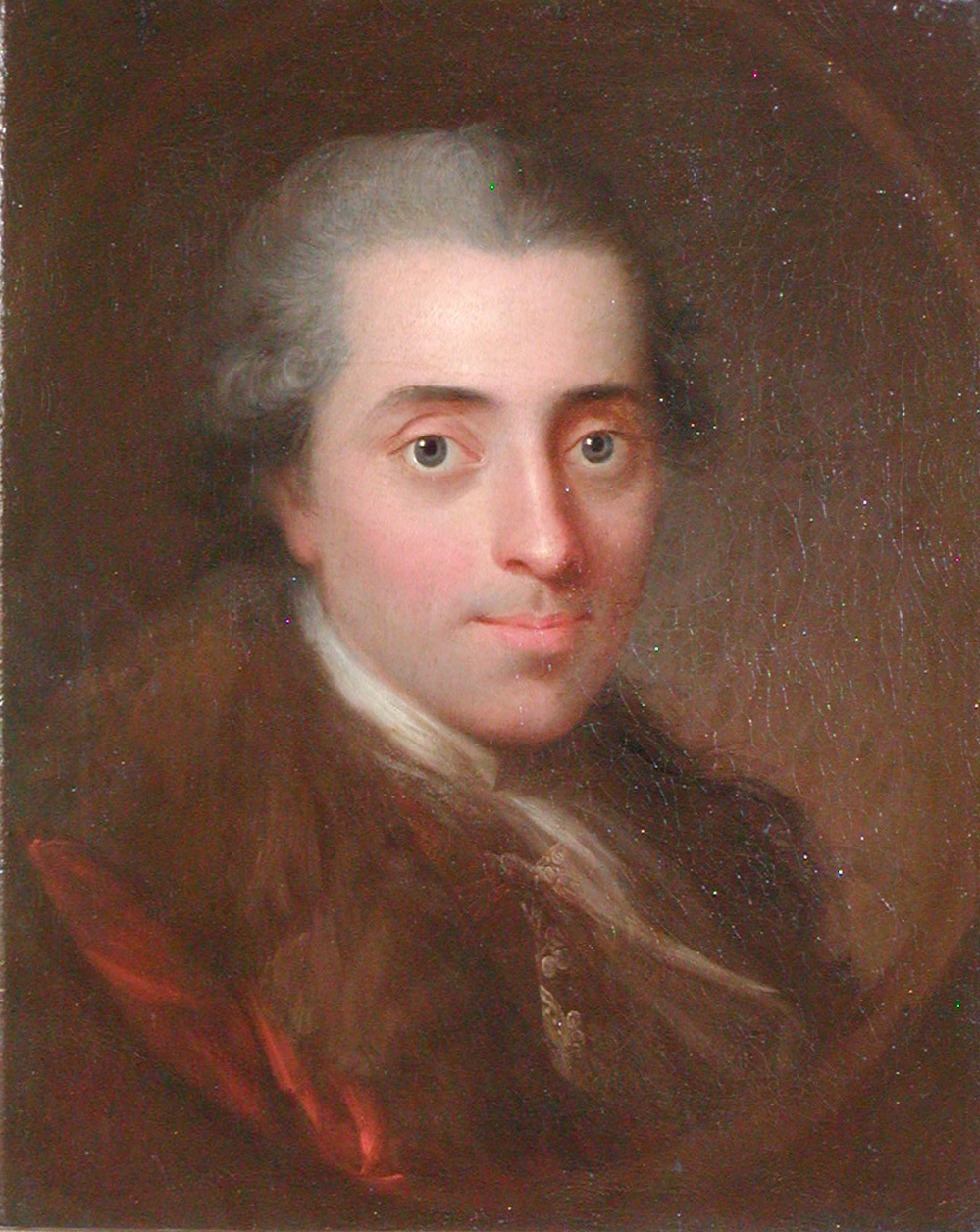
Johannes Ewald ca. 1780 by Erik Pauelsen

Johannes Ewald (18 November 1743 – 17 March 1781) was a Danish national dramatist, psalm writer and poet. The lyrics of a song from one of his plays are used for one of the Danish national anthems, Kong Christian stod ved højen mast which has equal status of national anthem together with Der er et yndigt land. Quite until the days of romanticism, Ewald was considered the unsurpassed Danish poet. Today he is probably more lauded than read; though considered classics, only few of his works have become popular.

== Biography ==
He was born in Copenhagen, Denmark. Ewald grew up in a strongly pietistic parsonage. His father was Enevold Ewald (1696-1754), vicar at the orphanage in Copenhagen. His maternal grandmother Marie Wulf (1685–1738), was a pietist and later a follower of the Moravian Church.

He was fatherless from an early age. He was sent to school in the Duchy of Schleswig, his father's birthplace, and returned to enter the University of Copenhagen in 1758. At 15 he ran away along with his brother and enlisted in the Prussian service. Being compelled to join a regiment of artillery at Magdeburg, instead of being attached to the hussars as he had been promised, he deserted the Prussian standard in the Seven Years' War, and entered the Austrian service, where he was made a non-commissioned officer. After a few months he again deserted, returned home. He had returned from the Seven Years' War seriously weakened.

He began to apply himself seriously to theology and in 1762 he became cand.theol. in 1762. Although he was educated as a theologian, but his real interest was in literature. An unhappy love for Arendse Hulegaard, inspired his later poetry deeply. After the death of his father, his mother was remarried to Arendse's uncle. Arendse later married another.

The following years were spent living as a bohemian and writing poetry in Copenhagen; there were also a time of alcoholism and conflicts with his mother and step-father. For most of his life he was under their tutelage and he never took up a profession. His lifestyle had much in common with his contemporary Johan Herman Wessel (1742–1785) although as writers they differed greatly. On the death of Frederick V of Denmark, Ewald was requested to compose an elegy (1766). The general admiration with which it was received roused his ambition, and he soon became one of the most eminent lyric and tragic poets of his nation.

In 1769, Ewald was severely attacked by gout which caused him to be confined to bed. From 1773 to 1775 he had a rather happy convalescence at Rungstedlund (later the home of Karen Blixen). Ewald wrote some of his best verses during this time, but a conflict with his family led to his removal to the small North Zealand town of Humlebæk (1775–77), which depressed him and worsened his alcoholism. Finally, friends brought him to Søbækshus, near Helsingør, and where he lived for some years under growing public interest and literary fame. Johannes Ewald led a short and troubled life, marked by alcoholism and financial problems. His life darkened by illness, distress and misfortune, Ewald died at age 37 and was buried in the cemetery of Trinitatis Church in Copenhagen. However, the cemetery largely disappeared in the aftermath of the Copenhagen Fire of 1795 (Københavns brand 1795) .

== Works ==
=== Poetry ===
As an author Ewald is a prominent representative of Danish sentimentalism but at the same time a forerunner of romanticism. His main inspiration was German poetry (Friedrich Gottlieb Klopstock), but other writers including Edward Young and Laurence Sterne, as well as Jean-Jacques Rousseau, are obvious inspirations as well. Violent expressions of feeling (happiness, sorrow and love) are typical in his writing; these elements are apparently spontaneous but, at the same time, deliberately and artificially drawn up. Behind this a clear pietist tune is felt.

Several Ewald poems are Danish classics. He had his break-through with a melodious and expressive commemorative poem at the death of King Frederick V (1766). The famous Rungsteds Lyksaligheder (1773 – "The Happiness of Rungsted") is an ode to the Creator. Ode til Sjælen ("For the Soul") is a worthy hailing of Man's uniqueness. Til min M*** ("For my M(oltke)) is a grateful praise for a noble benefactor, during the unhappy Humlebæk period. The hymn Udrust Dig, helt fra Golgatha ("Arm Yourself, Hero of Golgatha", 1781), practically written on his death-bed, must be mentioned.

=== Drama ===
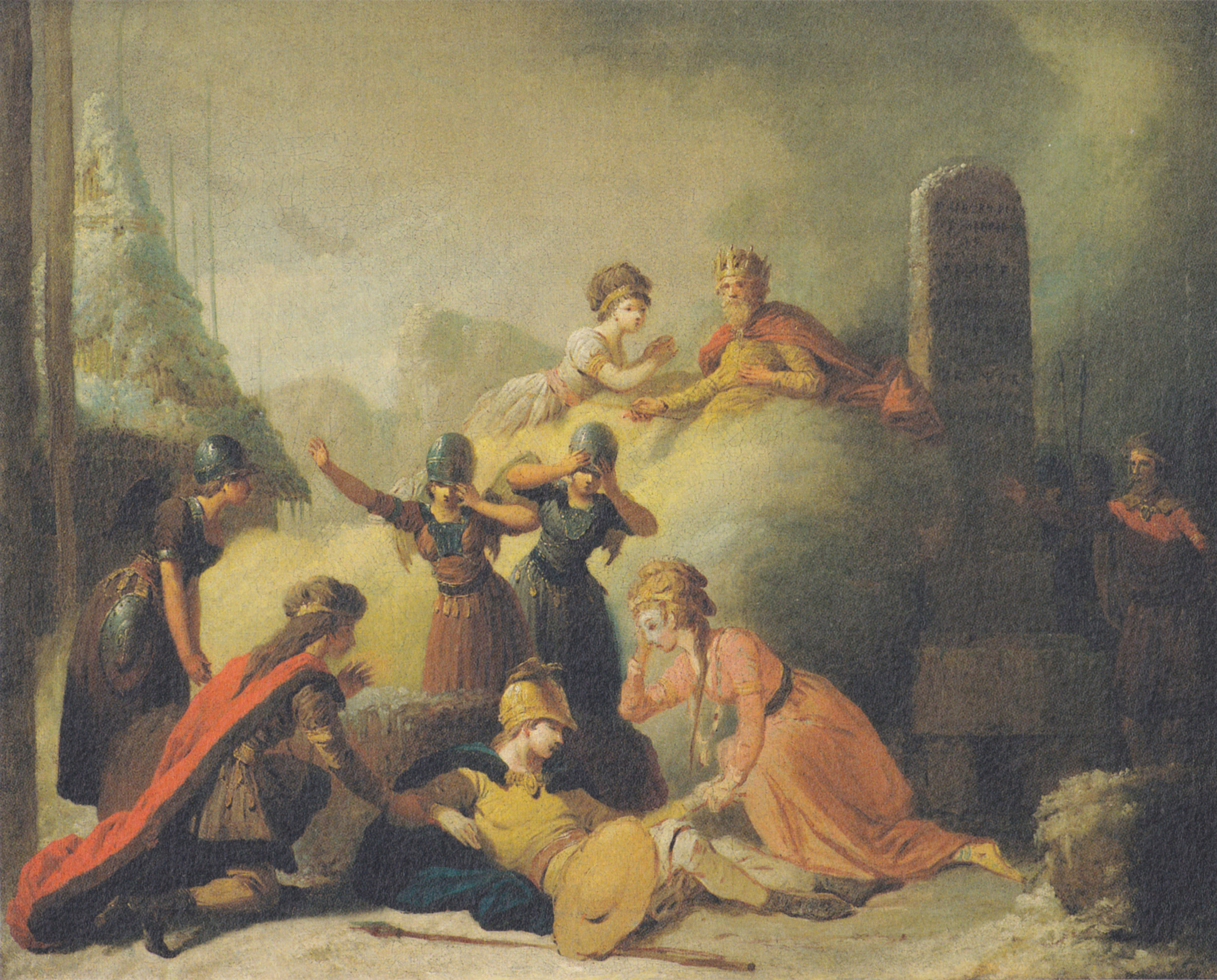
Tableau from the final scene of Balders Død by Peter Cramer (1779)

Just as important are Ewald's dramas. Ewald was the first to rely heavily on Norse mythology, a trend which begins to point towards romanticism. He wrote the plays Rolf Krage in 1770, Balders Død (Eng. transl. "The Death of Balder", 1889) in 1773, and Fiskerne (The Fishermen) in 1779. From the latter play one song is still remembered by most Danes: King Christian stood by the lofty mast that shares the position of being the national anthem of Denmark (the other is Oehlenschläger's "There is a lovely Land"). The two plays Balders Død and Fiskerne were put in music by composer Johann Hartmann.

=== Prose ===
Ewald's main prose work was the unfinished autobiography Levnet og Meninger ("Life and Opinions", written 1774–78, published 1804–08). It deals with the young Ewald's infatuation with Arendse and his escape to military life.

== See also ==
- Johannes Ewald and Johan Hermann Wessel Memorial
