= Norwegian Grand Prix (disambiguation) =

Norwegian Grand Prix can refer to:

- Norwegian Grand Prix, a Formula One motor race
- Speedway Grand Prix of Norway
- Melodi Grand Prix, sometimes Norwegian Melodi Grand Prix, an annual music competition organised by Norsk Rikskringkasting
