= Jacob Rasch =

Norwegian educator (1669–1737)

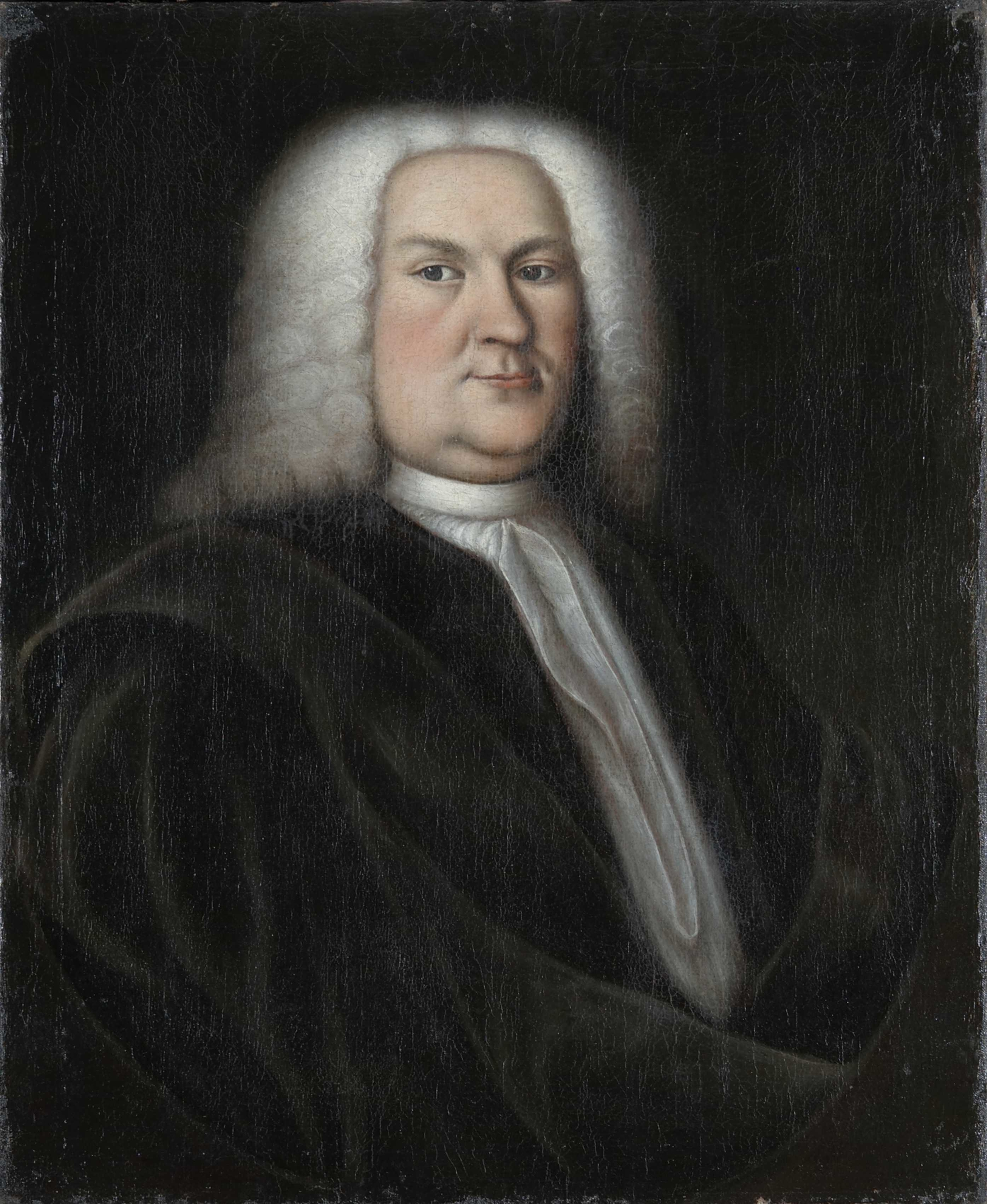
- Portrait of Rasch
- Born: 27 December 1669; Ogna, Norway
- Died: 1 October 1737 (aged 67)
- Occupation: Educator
- Relatives: Maren Juel (granddaughter); Jacob Juel (grandson); Bartholomæus Deichman (father-in-law)

Jacob Rasch (né Michelsen; 27 December 1669 – 1 October 1737) was a Norwegian educator.

He was born in Ogna to district stipendiary magistrate (sorenskriver) Michel Gundersen and Sophie Jacobsdatter Rasch. He was an uncle of songwriter Michael Heiberg, son-in-law of bishop Bartholomæus Deichman, and grandfather of Maren Juel and Jacob Juel. He graduated in theology at the University of Copenhagen in 1692, and in philosophy in 1696. He served as rector of Christiania Cathedral School from 1706 to 1737.

== Selected works ==
- Norsk ordsamling (1698)
