= Katten =

Katten may refer to:

- Pantteri, a Finnish candy sold in Sweden under the name "Katten"
- Katten Beach, a beach in Oslo, Norway
- Katten Muchin Rosenman, a law firm
- The Danish ship Katten, a vessel of the Dano-Norwegian Navy which participated in Christian IV's expeditions to Greenland
