= Marcus Gjøe Rosenkrantz =

Norwegian politician (1762–1838)

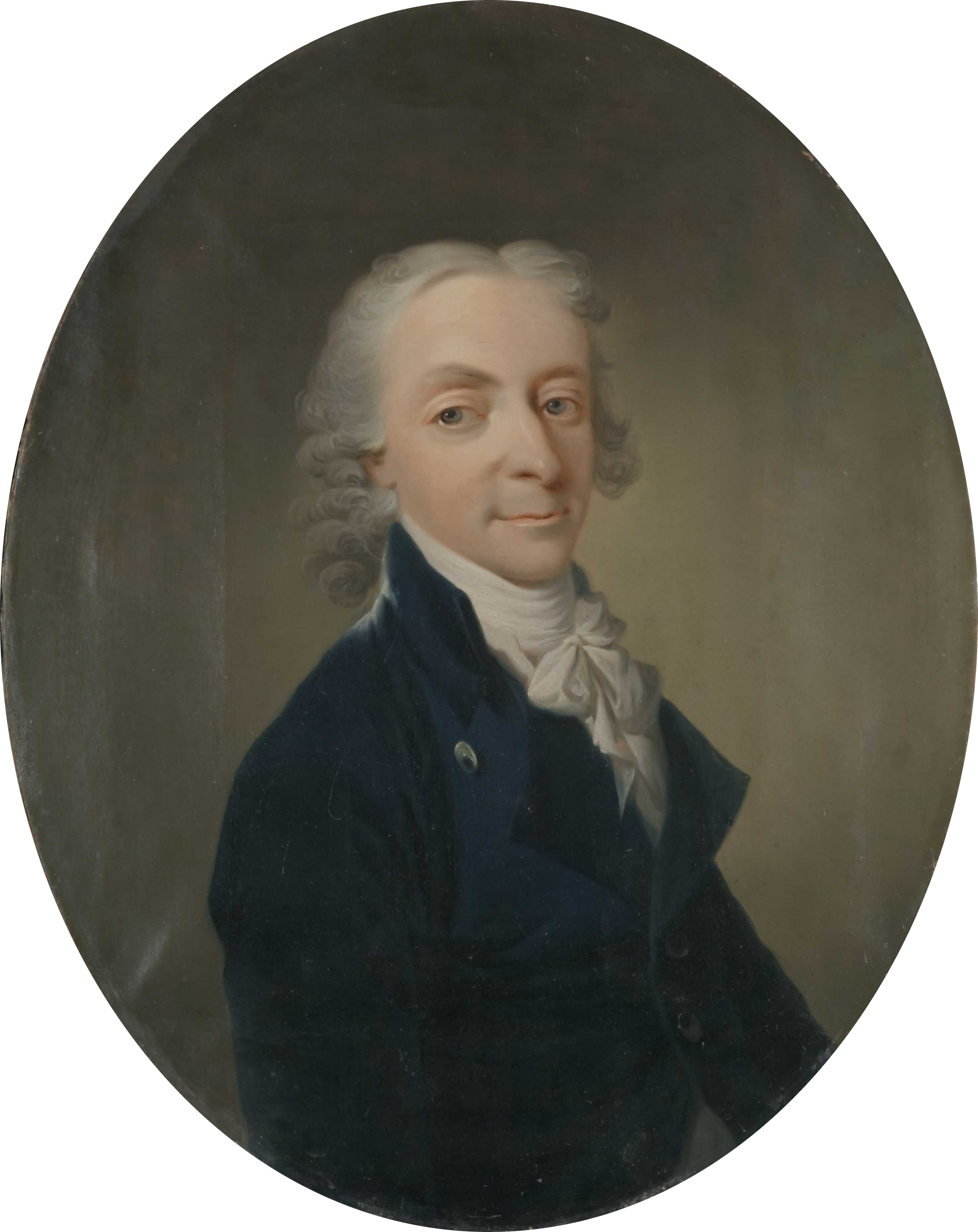

First Minister of Norway
- In office 1814–1815

Member of the Norwegian Parliament for Smaalenenes Amt
- In office 1818–1820; 1824–1827

Member of the Norwegian Parliament for Fredrikshald
- In office 1827–1829

Personal details
- Born: 25 January 1762 Vigvoll, Norway
- Died: 11 May 1838 (aged 76)

Marcus Gjøe Rosenkrantz (25 January 1762 – 11 May 1838) was a Norwegian Government Minister and Member of Parliament.

== Biography ==
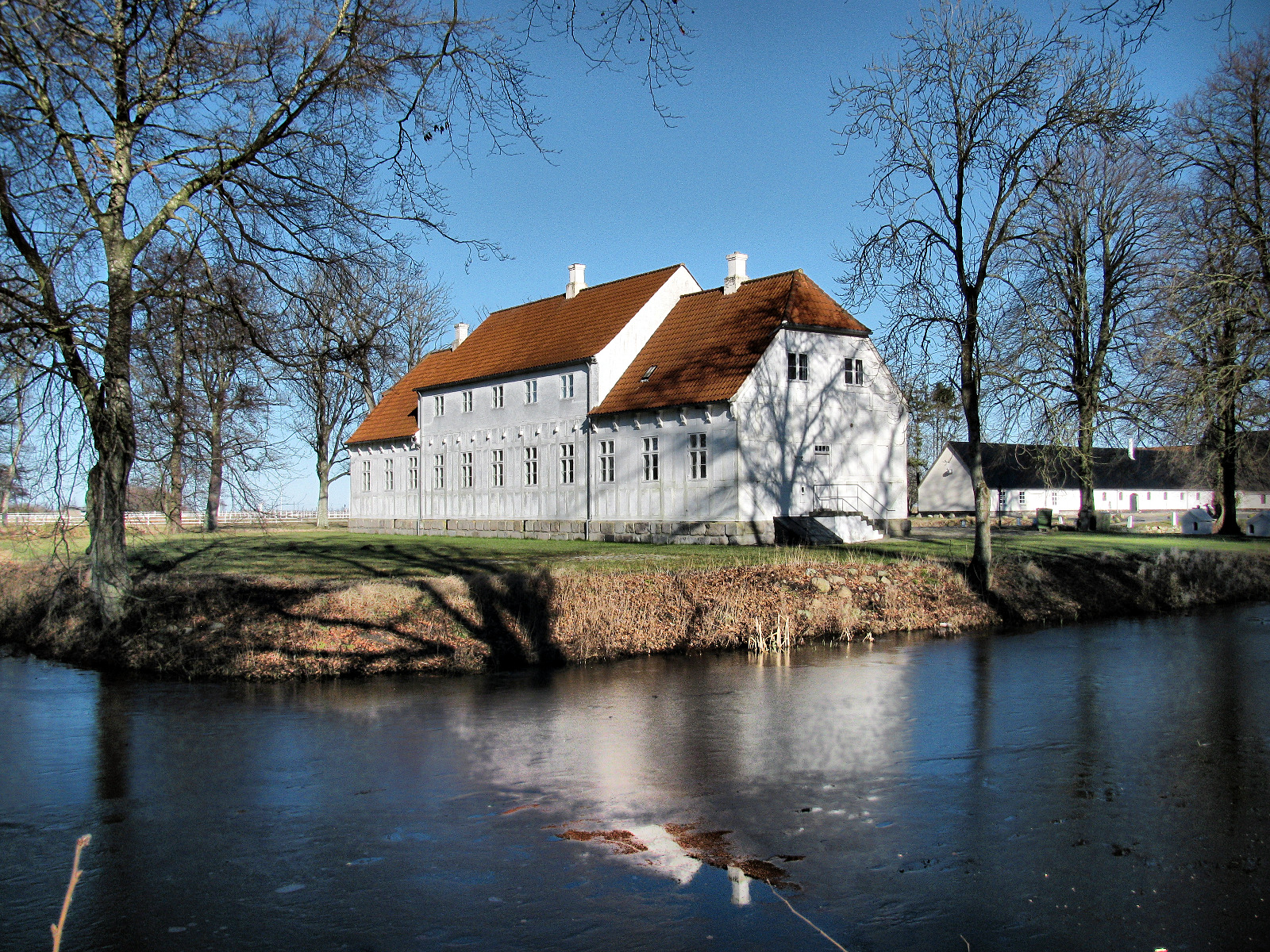
Lerbaek Hovedgaard

Marcus Gjøe Rosenkrantz was born at Vigvoll, Tveit near Kristiansand, Norway. His father, Otto Christian Rosenkrantz, was a Danish-Norwegian career military officer in various Dano-Norwegian regiments who served as commander of Vardøhus Fortress. Marcus Gjøe was the younger brother of Niels Rosenkrantz.

He attended the Royal Military mathematical school in Christiania (now Oslo) from 1776 to 1780. In 1781, he became a student at the University of Copenhagen where he earned his law degree in 1784. He worked for several years as an assessor for Overhoffretten, the highest court in Norway and later the County Court in Christiania.

In 1786, he bought Lerbaek Hovedgard manor at Frederikshavn with assets inherited from a distant relative, and moved there in 1790. In 1796, he married Maren Juel, by which he became a sizable landowner. After the death of her husband, Peder Holter (1723–1786), Maren Juel owned and managed a number of properties including Losby in Lørenskog as well as the estates Hafslund and Borregaard in Sarpsborg and the Ljan Estate (Ljansbruket) which included Stubljan in Nordstrand and Hvitebjørn in Oppegård. In time, they became one of the largest sawmill owners and timber exporters in the country.

Rosenkrantz was among those who met at Eidsvold in 1814, to discuss the future of Norway in the aftermath of the Treaty of Kiel. He became first minister of Norway during the period 1814–1815. He was elected as a Member of the Storting representing Smaalenenes Amt (now Østfold) from 1818 to 1820 and from 1824 to 1827. From 1827 to 1829, he represented Fredrikshald.

== Honors ==
- Order of the Dannebrog
- Serafimerordenen
- Nordstjärneorden
