= Svartskog =

- Village
- Location in Akershus
- Coordinates: 59.7786°N 10.7506°E
- Country: Norway
- Region: Østlandet
- County: Akershus
- Municipality: Nordre Follo
- Time zone: UTC+01:00 (CET)
  - Summer (DST): UTC+02:00 (CEST)

Svartskog is a village in Nordre Follo, Akershus, Norway.
