= Hvitebjørn =

Farm in Akershus, Norway

Coordinates: 59°48′50″N 10°45′50″E

Hvitebjørn (Hvitebjørn gård) is a historical farm near the village of Svartskog in Nordre Follo, Akershus, Norway.

== Location ==
Hvitebjørn gård is located near the coast of Bunnefjorden in eastern Norway. The farm is situated between Bunnefjorden and the Gjersjøelva river.

== History ==
Hvitebjørn was first mentioned in recorded documents dating from 1529. The farm was once owned by St Mary's Church in Oslo. In 1572, the properties of St. Mary's Church were transferred to the Chancellor of Norway, Hans Litle (1540-1602). From 1647, the farm was owned by Hannibal Sehested, Governor-general of Norway who transferred it to the Crown as an exchange of properties.

In 1669, the farm was bought by Christiania Councilman Peder Pedersen Müller (1635-1714). In 1694, when he married the widow Sidselle Rasmusdatter, he also acquired the neighboring farm, Stubljan i Aker. He founded an estate largely built on sawmill operations on the Gjersjøelva. In time, he acquired property on both sides of sides of Bunnefjorden with the farms Hvitebjørn and Stubljan operating as a part of Ljan Estate (Ljansgodset). In 1799, the farm was taken over by Lars Ingier, and the farm belonged to the Ingier family until about 1950.

Today, the farm operates as an equestrian center and riding school featuring stabling and training of horses. Additionally, the farm offers therapy horseback riding, show jumping, and gait riding. The farm stables a sizable selection of Icelandic horses.
