= Norwegian Grand Prix =

- Gjersjøen, Oppegård

Race information
- Number of times held: 3
- First held: 1934
- Last held: 1936
- Most wins (drivers): (Sweden) Per Victor Widengren (2)
- Most wins (constructors): Alfa Romeo (3)
- Circuit length: 3 km (1.9 miles)
- Race length: 60 km (36 miles)
- Laps: 20 laps

Last race (1936)

Pole position
- (Sweden) Per Victor Widengren; Alfa Romeo

Podium
- 1. (Norway) Eugen Bjørnstad; Alfa Romeo; 34:39.5; 2. (Sweden) Helmer Carlsson-Alsed; Bugatti

Fastest lap
- (Sweden) Per Victor Widengren; Alfa Romeo; 1.38.2

The Norwegian Grand Prix ("Norge Grand Prix" in Norwegian) was a motor race. Its history dates back to 1912, but did not re-emerge after German occupation in World War II. One of many races held in the Scandinavian region, its history was as an ice race, with Grand Prix racing machinery taking to various circuits laid out on frozen lakes.

The brief Grand Prix era in Norway began in 1934. After many years racing near Oslo on Gjersjøen lake, in 1932 warmer conditions saw racing move north to Lillehammer and onto Lake Mjøsa. Regular Scandinavian racer Per Victor Widengren took the 1934 Norwegian Grand Prix win in an Alfa Romeo Monza after visiting polesitter Paul Pietsch retired. The race returned to the Oslo region in 1935 where a big crowd saw Widengren successfully defend his title against the threat of Karl Ebb in his Mercedes-Benz SSK.

The race returned to its traditional home in 1936 but just three racing cars fronted. After Widengren retired, local hero Eugen Bjørnstad finally got a win in his home event in his Alfa Romeo Monza with the Bugatti Type 35 of Helmer Carlsson-Alsed the only other finisher. This was the last time racing cars held a race in Norway before the war and did not resume afterwards as rallying started to dominate the Scandinavian countries.

== Winners ==
| Year | Driver | Constructor | Location | Report |
|---|---|---|---|---|
| 1934 | (Sweden) Per Victor Widengren | Alfa Romeo | Lake Mjøsa | Report |
| 1935 | (Sweden) Per Victor Widengren | Alfa Romeo | Bogstad | Report |
| 1936 | (Norway) Eugen Bjørnstad | Alfa Romeo | Gjersjøen | Report |
