= Nøklevann =

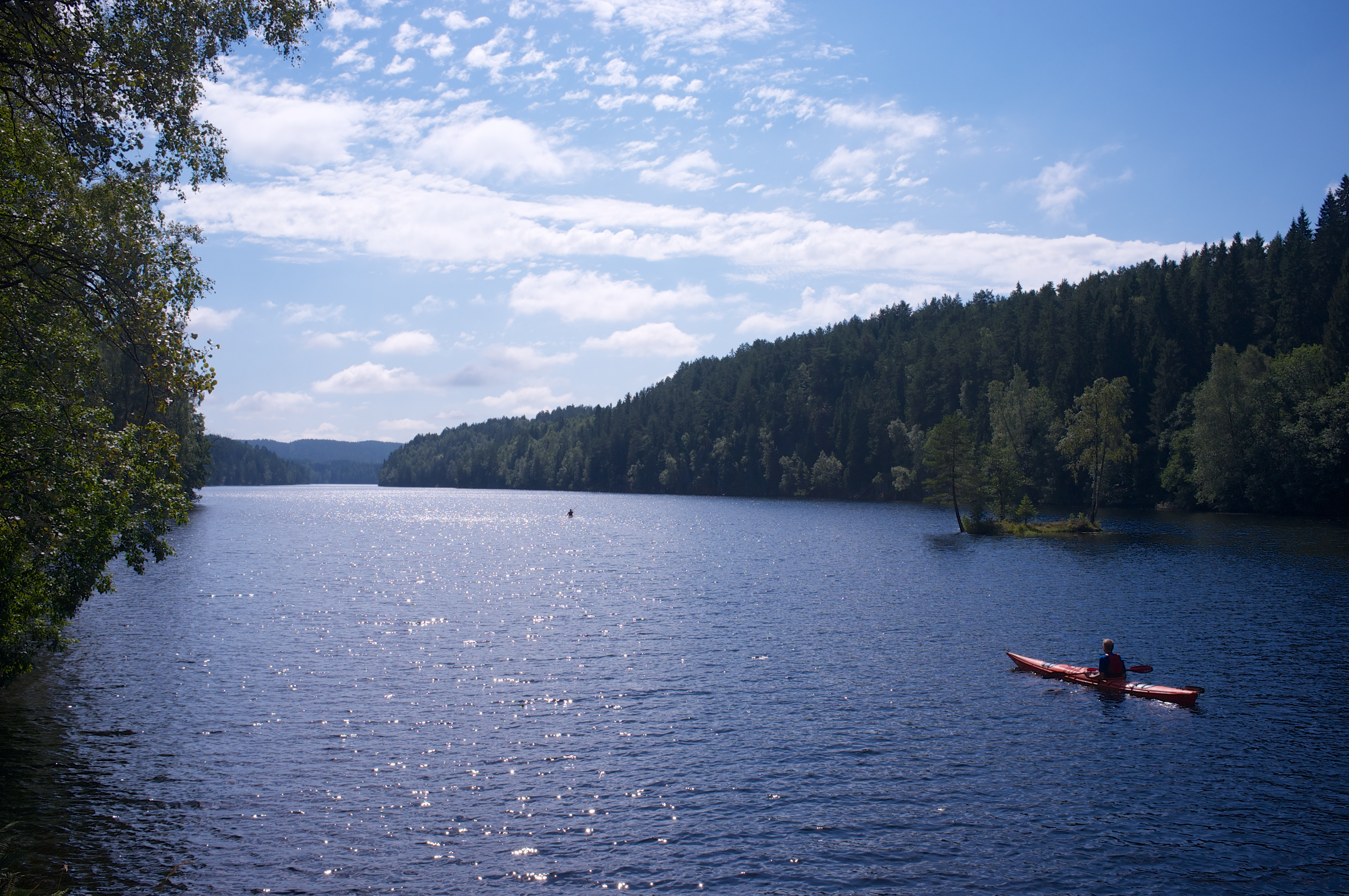
- Nøklevann, seen from north

- Location within Norway

- Location: Oslo, Norway
- Coordinates: 59°52′31″N 10°52′37″E
- Type: Natural lake
- Primary outflows: Ljanselva
- Basin countries: Norway
- Surface area: 0.63 km^{2} (0.24 sq mi)
- Max. depth: 34 m (112 ft)
- Surface elevation: 163 m (535 ft)

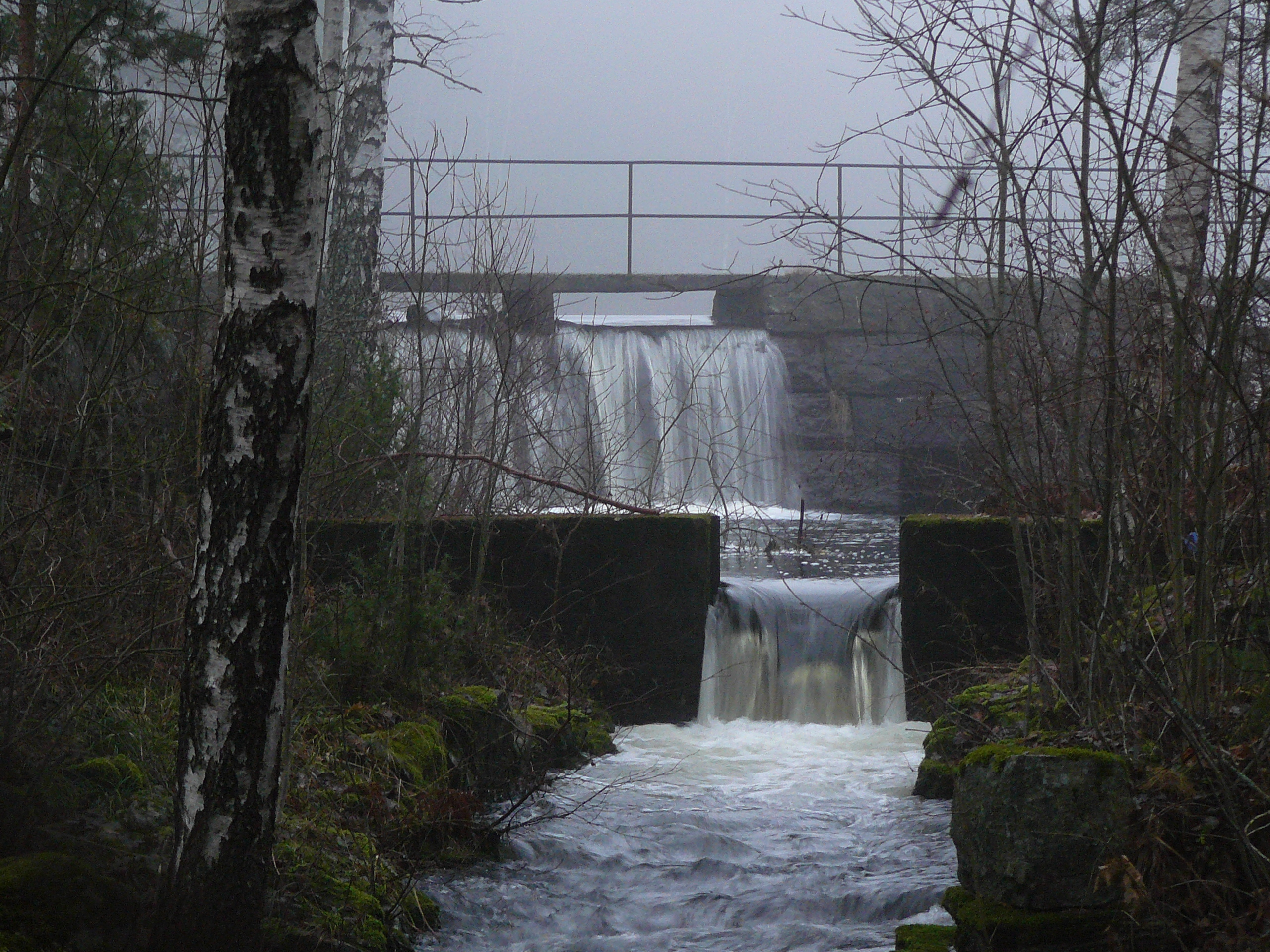
The Nøklevann Dam at Rustadsaga.

Nøklevann is a lake in Østmarka in Oslo, Norway. It has a surface area of 0.8 km^{2}, and is 163 meters above sea level. The lake drains through Ljanselva to Bunnefjorden. It is a former drinking water supply for Oslo.
