= Johannes Ewald and Johan Hermann Wessel Memorial =

Coordinates: 55°40′53″N 12°34′34″E

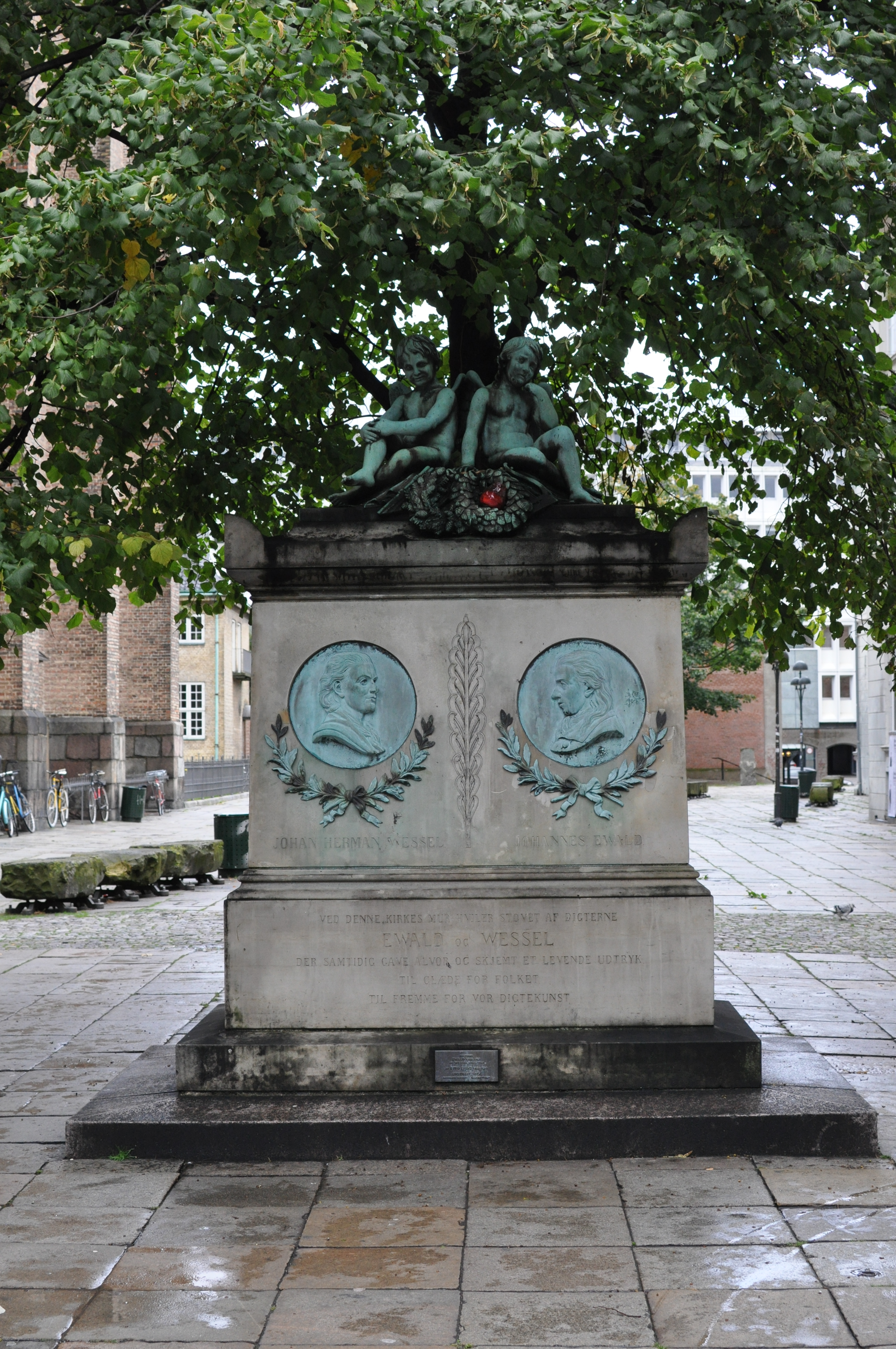
The monument seen from Købmagergade

The Johannes Ewald and Johan Hermann Wessel Memorial is located next to the Round Tower and Trinitatis Church, just off Købmagergade, in central Copenhagen, Denmark. Johannes Ewald and Johan Herman Wessel were two of the leading Danish poets of the 18th century.

== History ==
Trinitatis Church was originally surrounded by a cemetery where Ewald and Wessel were buried. The cemetery disappeared in the aftermath of the Copenhagen Fire of 1795. In the 1870s, a committee launched a campaign to create a monument in memory of the two poets and it was supported by the City and with the Eibeschütz Grant for the Embellishment of the City (Det Eibeschützske Legat til Stadens Forskjønnelse). Otto Evens was charged with designing the monument which was unveiled in 1879.

== Description ==
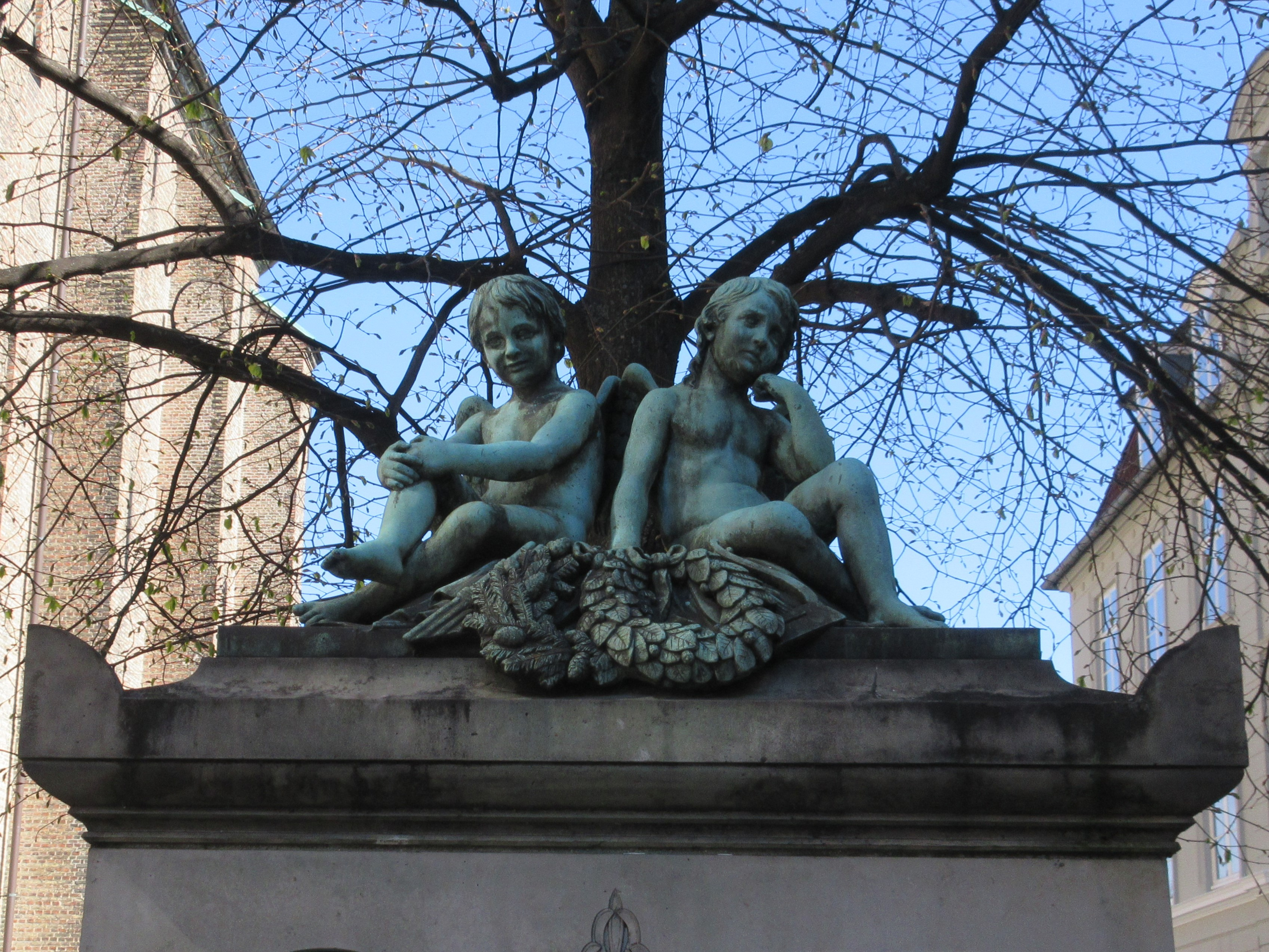
The sculpture

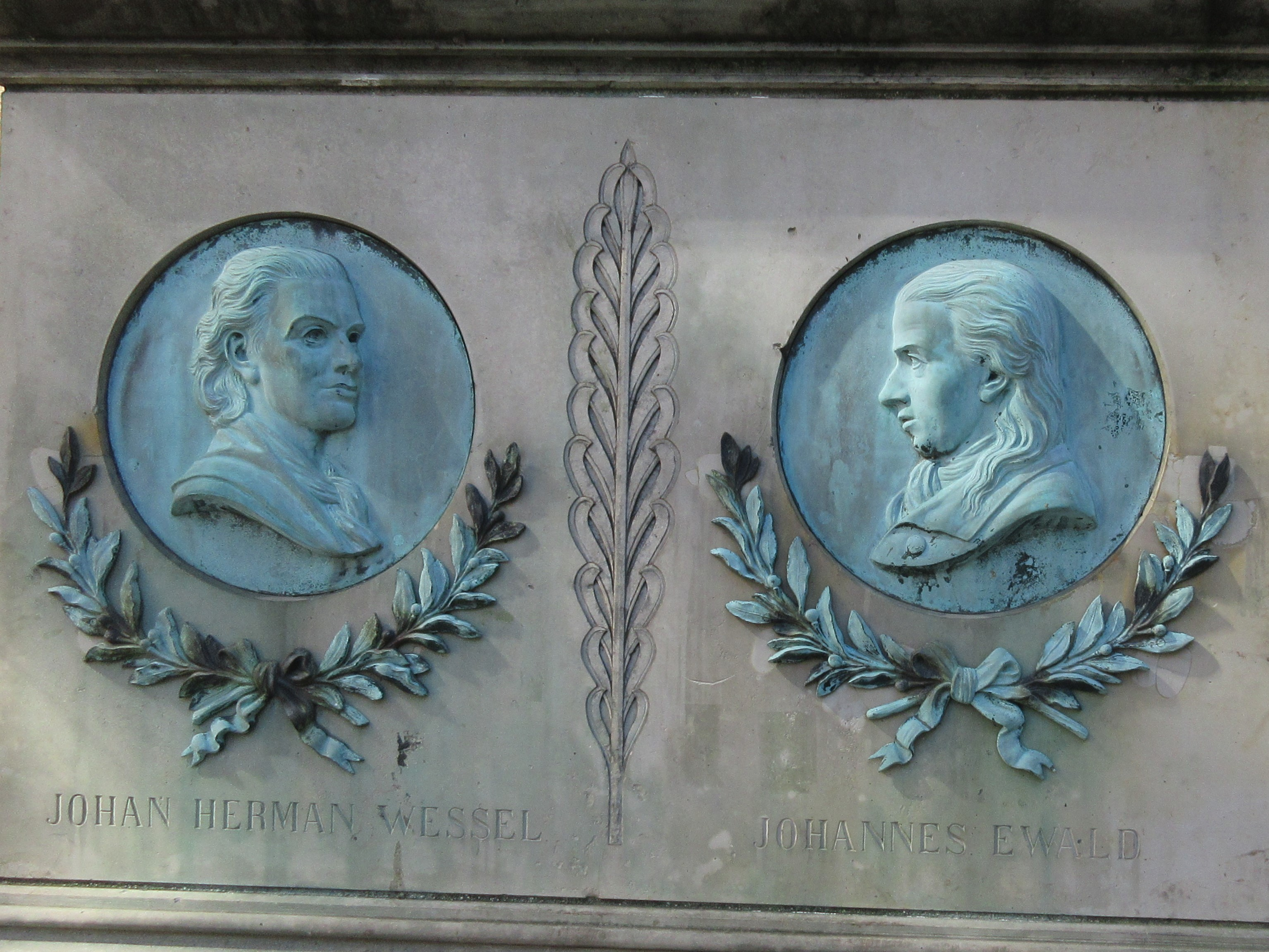
The two portrait reliefs

The monument consists of a relatively small bronze sculpture of two winged putti on a large sandstone pedestal designed in the style of an antique sarcofague. It stands on a low bronze plinth and measures approximately 308 cm × 290 cm × 185 cm (121 in × 114 in × 73 in) One of the winged putti has a laurel wreath and a lyre as attributes and the other a spruce wreath and a pan flute.

The face of the pedestal features two bronze medallion with portraits of the two poets in relief and their names inscribed below in carved lettering.

The lower part of the pedestal carries the inscription:

"VED DENNE KIRKES MUR HVILER STØVET AF DIGTERNE // EWALD OG WESSEL // DER SAMTIDIG GAVE ALVOR OG SKJEMT ET LEVENDE UDTRYK/TIL GLÆDE FOR FOLKET // TIL FREMME FOR VOR DIGTERKUNST".

On the left hand face of the upper part of the pedestal is the inscription:

"JOHAN HERMAN WESSEL // F. I VESTBY VED CHRISTIANIA FJORD 6 OCTBR. 1742, // DØD I KJØBENHAVN D 29 DECEMBER 1785 // GRAAD SMELTED HEN I SMIL // NÅR WESSELS LUNE BØD // OG GLÆDENS SMIL FORSVANDT/I TAARER VED HANS DØD // BAGGESEN".

On the right hand face of the upper part of the pedestal is the inscription:

"JOHANNES EWALD // FØDT I KJØBENHAVN D 18 NOVEMBER 1743 // DØD I KJØBENHAVN D 17 MARTS 1781 // VED ISSEN KIRKEN ROLIG I SIN SKY/VED FODEN USSELHED I SNEVRE BY/HER HELLIG KRAFT OG TRØST HIST SORG OG NØD // DU STOD I LIVET SOM DU LAA I DØD // OEHLENSCHLÆGER.".

On the rear face of the upper part of the pedestal is the inscription: "REIST 1879."
