= Lars Ingier =

Norwegian military officer, road manager, land owner and mill owner

- Born: 15 February 1760; Ullensaker, Norway
- Died: 22 June 1828 (aged 68); Stubljan
- Military career
- Allegiance: Swedish
- Rank: Lieutenant Colonel
- Commands: Pioneer unit
- Conflicts: Dano-Swedish War (1808–1809)
- Awards: Knight of the Swedish Order of the Sword
- Other work: Road manager Land owner and mill owner

Lars Ingier (15 February 1760 – 22 June 1828) was a Norwegian military officer, road manager, land owner and mill owner.

As road manager of eastern Norway, he was responsible for constructing the King's road through Krokskogen. He is credited for having introduced right-hand driving in Norway.

Settling with his family at the Ljan estate Stubljan, he was running several saw mills, a corn mill, a niter mill and a powder mill.

== Personal life ==
Ingier was born in Ullensaker as the son of military officer Hans Christophersøn Ingier and Anne Schulstad. The Ingier family hailed from the ancient Ullensaker farm Ingier, known from the Middle Ages as Ingigjærdi. In 1792 he married Gjertrud Maren Juel. He died at Stubljan in Aker in 1828.

== Career ==
Ingier graduated from the Norwegian Military Academy, with the rank of Premier Lieutenant. He then abandoned the military career and started a career in road construction. From the 1780s he was appointed road manager (Norwegian: generalveimester) of the Diocese of Akershus, which covered most of Eastern Norway at the time. Among his road projects were the King's road through Krokskogen and a new road passing the mountain at Holmestrand. He is credited for having introduced right-hand driving in Norway, by issuing posters in 1807, and this principle was included in the Road Traffic Regulation Acts of 1824 and 1851.

In 1799 he acquired the farms Stubljan and Hvitebjørn from his wife's aunt Maren Juel, and the family settled at Stubljan. At his estate Ingier was running four saw mills, a corn mill, a niter mill and a powder mill. His wife was related to leading Christiania families, and Stubljan became the site for parties for the city's social elite. While running the activities at his estate, he retained his position as road manager. During the Dano-Swedish War of 1808-1809 he was in command of a pioneer unit in Østfold, responsible for technical support. He was promoted to the rank Lieutenant Colonel (Norwegian: oberstløytnant) in 1809.

Ingier was decorated as a Knight of the Swedish Order of the Sword in 1818. The Ingierstrand seaside resort in Oppegård, originally part of Stubljan and acquired by Oslo Municipality in 1936, is named after the Ingier family.
