= Ljanselva =

River in Oslo, Norway

Coordinates: 59°51′N 10°46′E

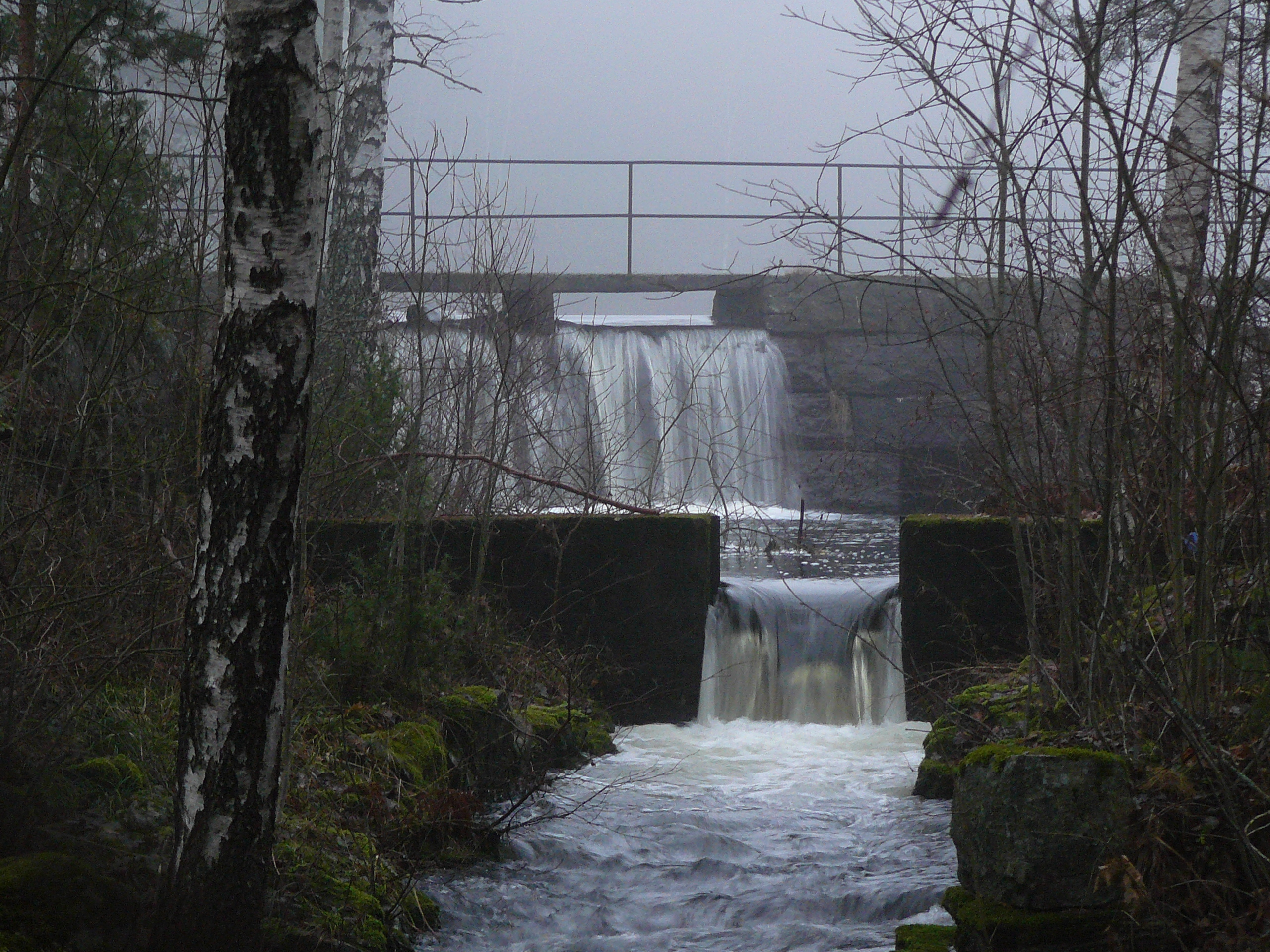
Ljanselva at the outlet from Nøklevann, via the dam at Rustadsaga.

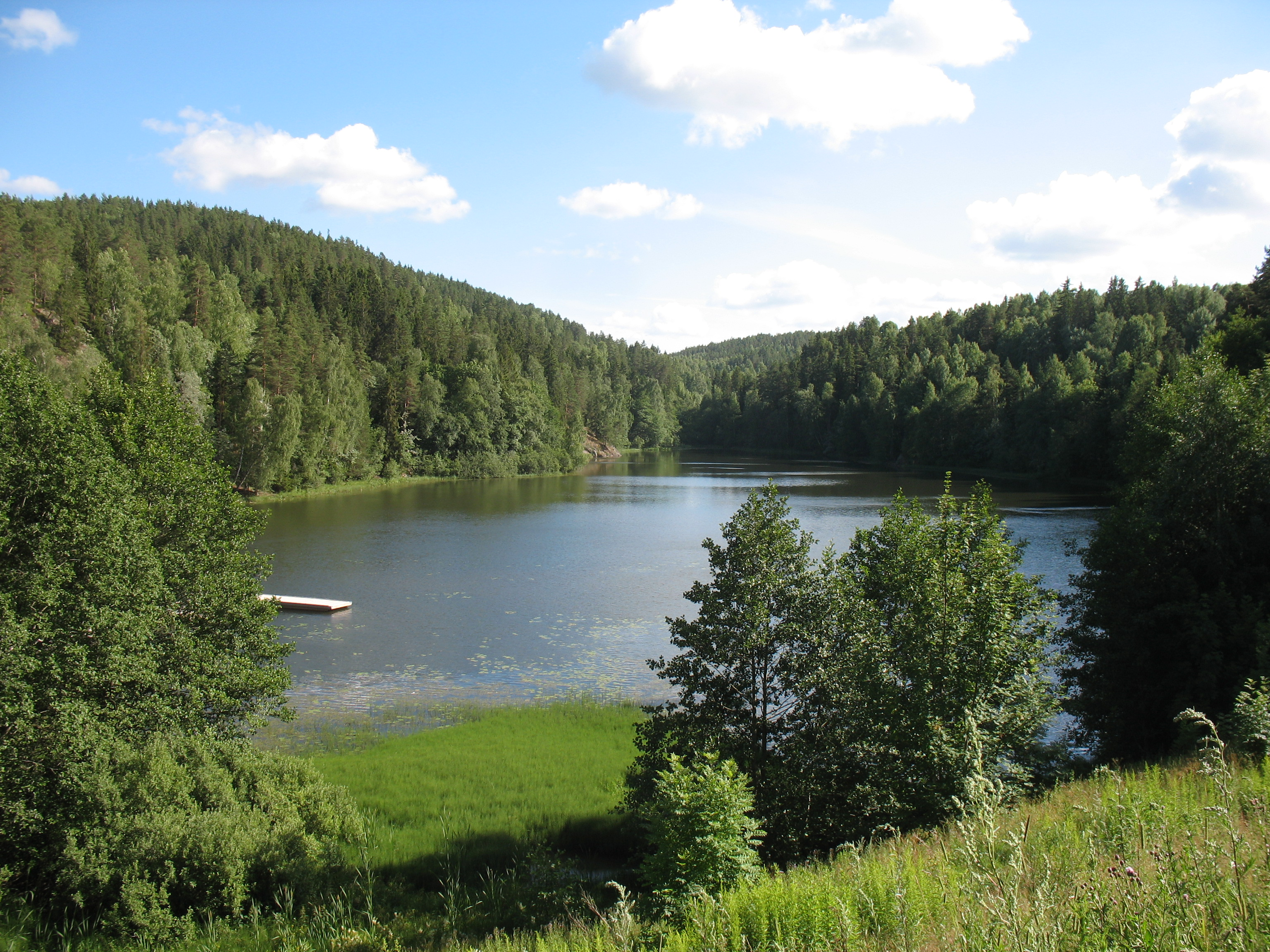
Shortly after Nøklevann Ljanselva flows through the small lake Skraperudtjern.

Ljanselva is a river in Oslo, Norway. It flows from Lutvann and Nøklevann and mouth into Bunnefjorden at Fiskevollbukta. Several saw mills were located along Ljanselva. The lower part of the river is a protected cultural site.
