= Hvervenbukta =

Recreation area in Oslo, Norway

Coordinates: 59°49′58″N 10°46′21″E

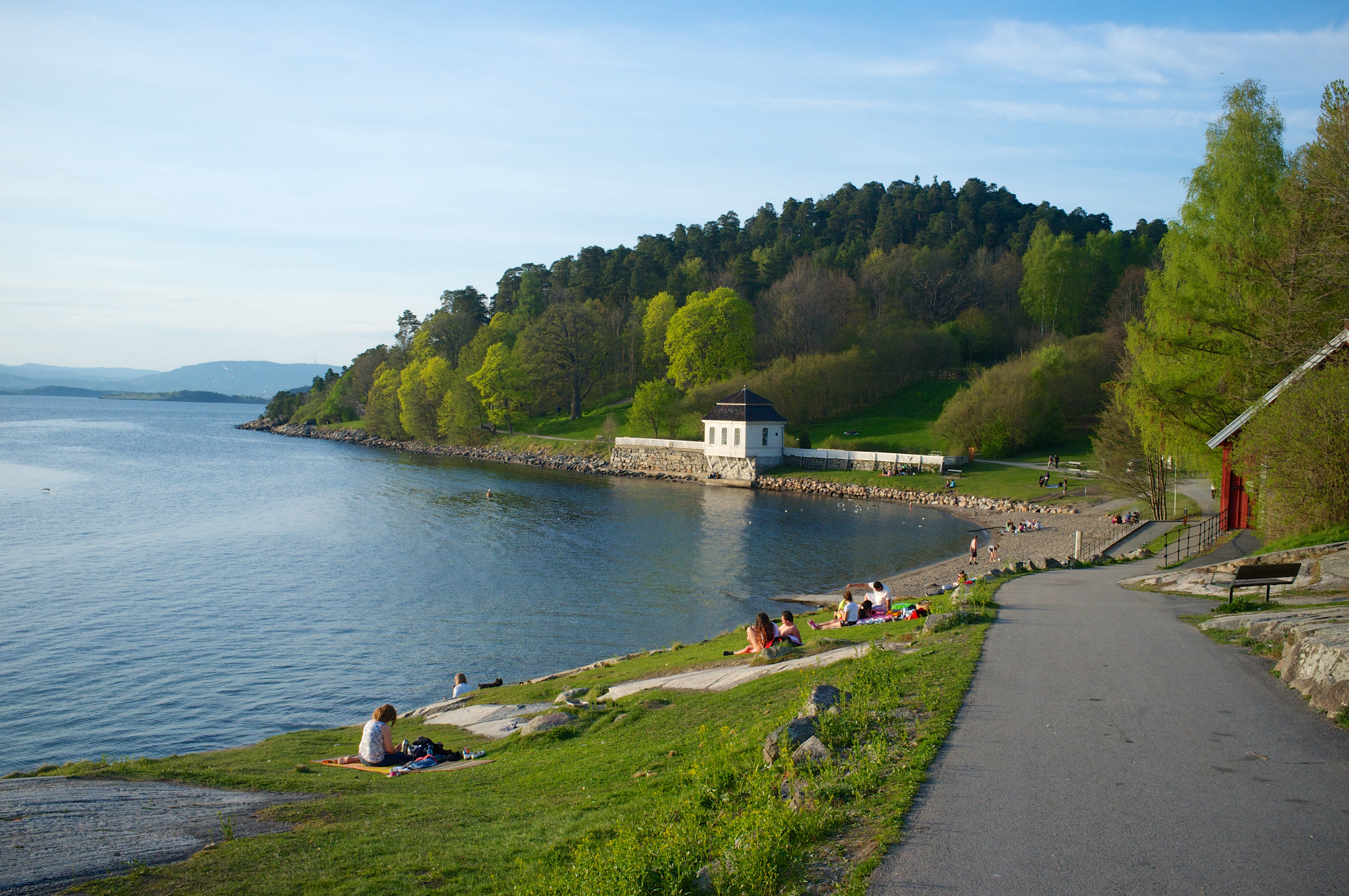
Hvervenbukta in 2014

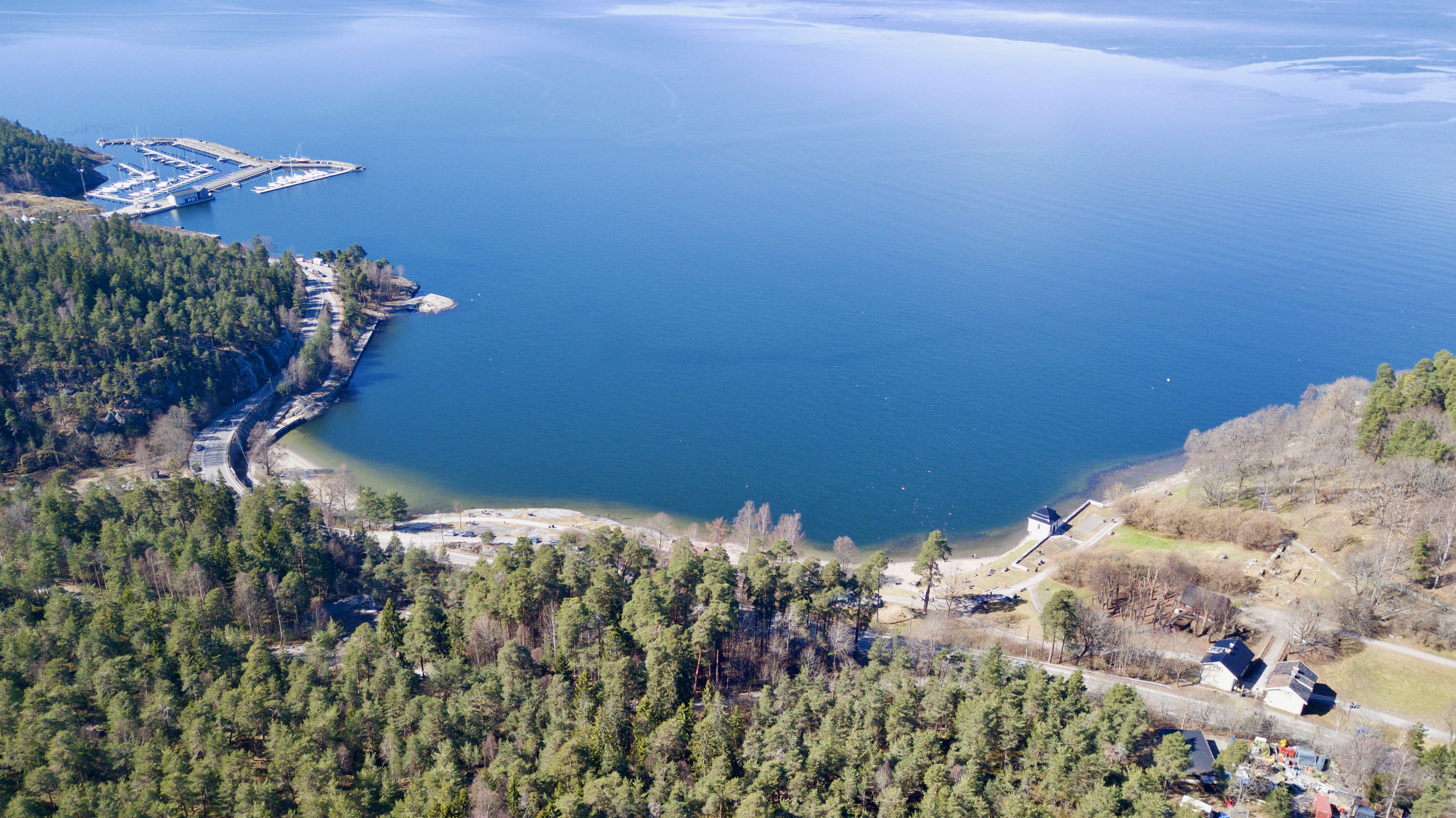
Hvervenbukta as seen from the air in 2018

Hvervenbukta is a swimming and recreation area southeast of the city center of Oslo, Norway, located at the shores of Bunnefjorden in the borough of Søndre Nordstrand, and not far from Ljan and Holmlia.

The area originally belonged to Ljan mansion. The main building here was from 1765, and burned down in 1913. Former Aker municipality took over the properties in 1937. Some of the remaining buildings in the area is now used by artists and artisans.

The site has one of Oslo's most popular beaches, with swimming opportunities along the sandy beach and from the rocks along the fjord. The bathing area in Hvervenbukta has a terrace café and kiosk, toilets and outhouse, picnic tables, showers and drinking-water units. The place is usable for disabled and has a lifeguard during the summer months.

In Hvervenbukta there is also a campsite.

== Gallery ==
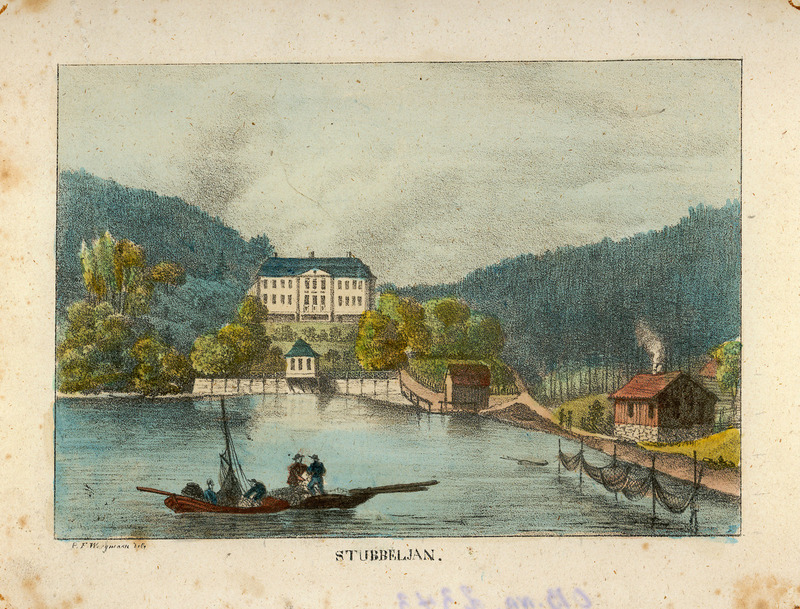
The mansion Ljangodset by Hvervenbukta

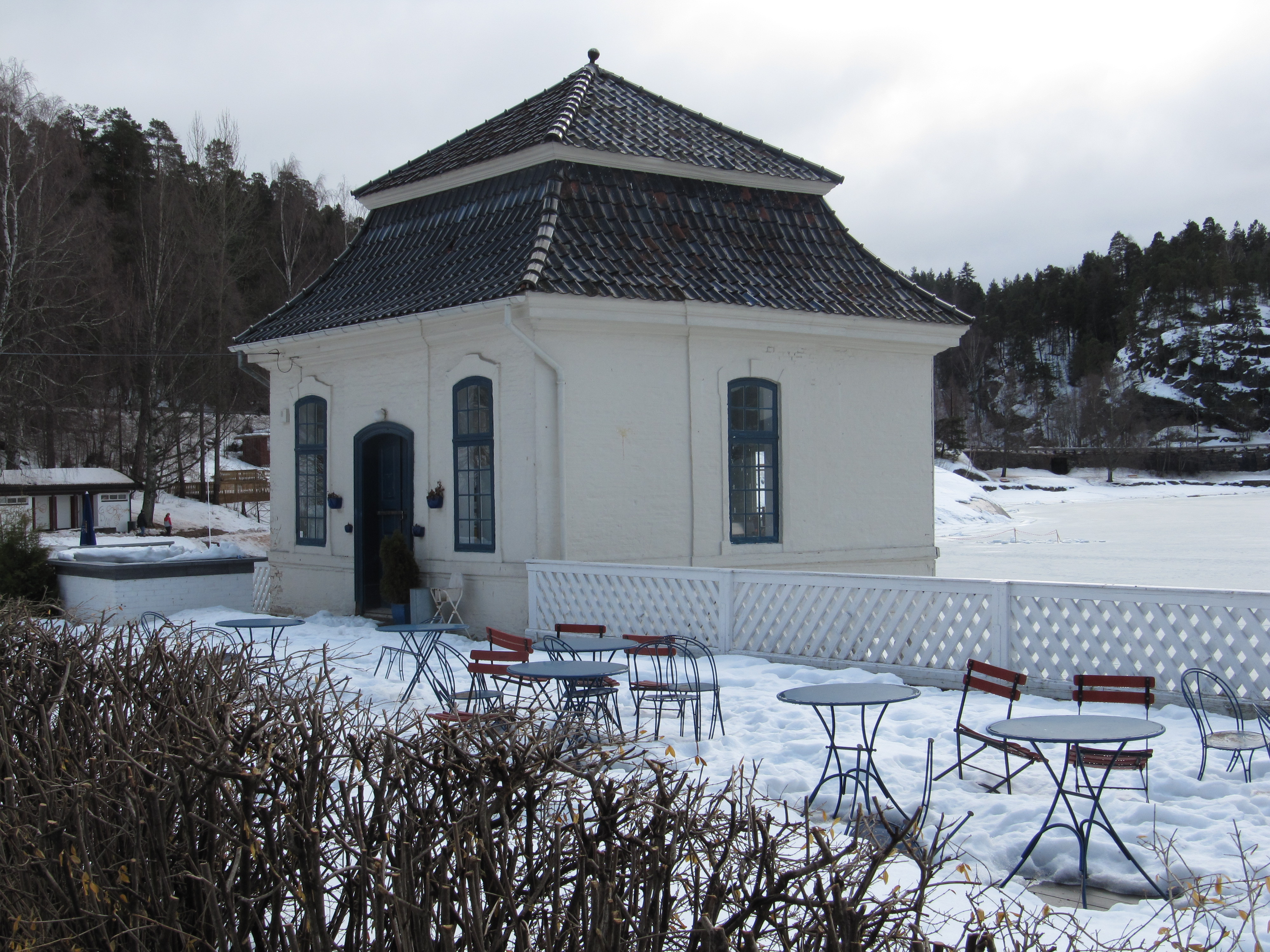
The gazebo/pavilion in Hvervenbukta, used as kiosk and café

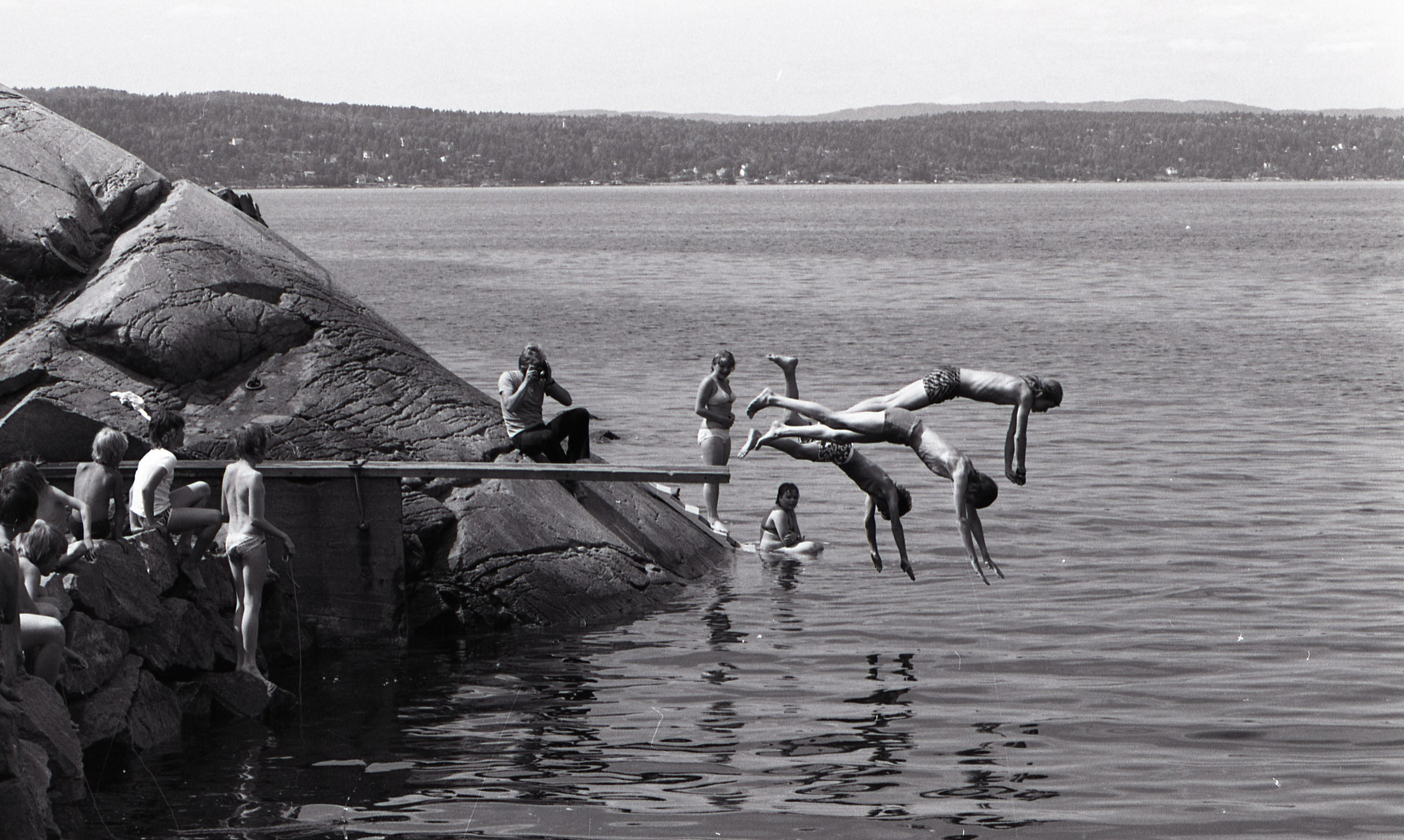
Swimming and diving from the rocks in Hvervenbukta 1975
