= Marie Wulf =

Danish preacher (1685–1738)

Marie Wulf (August 1685 – January 27, 1738), was a Danish preacher; a pietist and later a follower of the Moravian Church.

== Life ==
Wulf moved to Copenhagen to keep household for her brother Conrad, a clerk at the royal court, from the border to Germany, where pietism was strong. She married the builder Mathias Wulf (1690–1728) in ca. 1714. She was the maternal grandmother of Johannes Ewald.

During the great plague of 1711, she translated the pietistic Seelen-Schatz by C. Scriver to Danish. After the great 1728 fire of Copenhagen, she housed many homeless in her house, and began to preach the pietistic faith; she later begun to use the inn Den gyldne Oxe (The Golden Oxe), which became referred to as Den hellige Oxe (The Holy Oxe), while her son-in-law Enevold Ewald did the same in Vajsenhuskirken. In 1731, she met Nikolaus Ludwig von Zinzendorf and became the leader of the female branch of the Moravian church in Copenhagen. In 1733, the monarch formed a commission on the demand of the Lutheran church to examine the activities of Wulf and Ewald. She was acquitted from any punishment, but the inn banned her from her localities. It is not known whether she continued her sermons in any other place.

== See also ==
- Catharina Freymann
