= Ole Christopher Wessel =

Norwegian jurist, civil servant and landowner

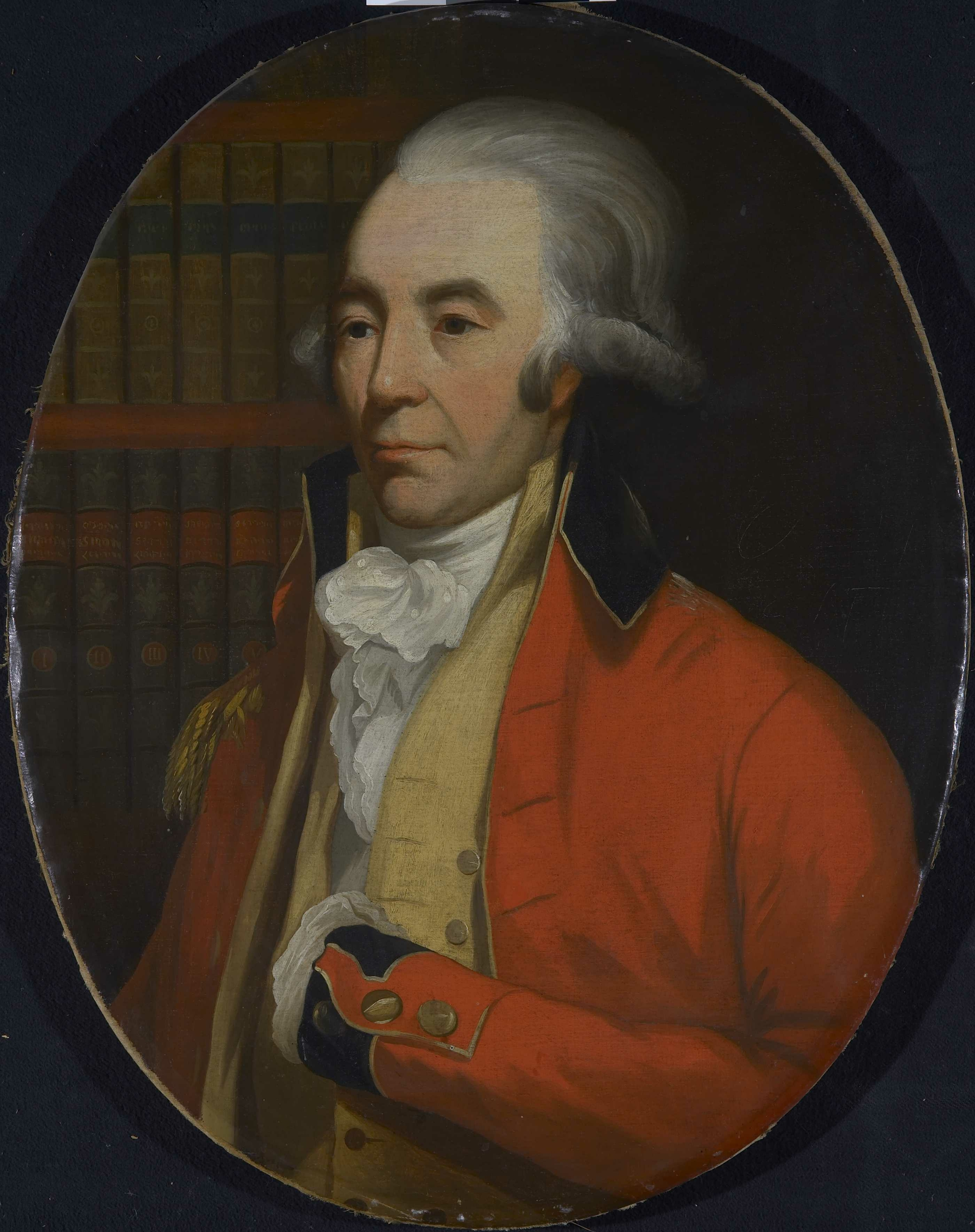
Ole Christopher Wessel

Ole Christopher Wessel (12 January 1744 – 26 December 1794) was a Norwegian jurist, civil servant and landowner. He lived in Denmark-Norway.

He was born in Vestby in Akershus as the son of parish priest Jonas Wessel (1707-1785) and Helene Marie Schumacher (1715-1789). He was a brother of poet Johan Herman Wessel and cartographer Caspar Wessel. In 1757, he entered Christiania Cathedral School after which he was enrolled at the University of Copenhagen. In 1770, he received the job of assessor and rose through the ranks via Court of Justice, until he in 1790 was Chief Justice. He married Helene Carlsen Barclay in 1779. They divorced in 1790 and in 1791 he married Maren Juel (1749-1815), Norway's wealthiest woman, and thus became owner of the estates Hafslund Manor and Borregaard Manor in Sarpsborg as well as Stubljan in Nordstrand.
