= Jacob Juel =

Norwegian timber trader and civil servant

Jacob Juel (1744 – 21 April 1800) was a Norwegian timber trader and civil servant. He was born in Christiania as the son of timber trader and civil servant Hans Juel and Else Sophie Dorothea Rasch. He was the brother of Maren Juel. He was assigned the title of Zahlkasserer in 1774. He also owned large land properties and a shipyard. He was arrested in 1784, after a deficience in the cash balance of 556,000 Rdlr, but eventually managed to escape and later lived in exile in Sweden.
