= Liv Bliksrud =

Norwegian philologist (born 1945)

Liv Bliksrud (born 12 March 1945) is a Norwegian philologist.

She took the cand.philol. degree in 1973 and the dr.philos. degree in 1987. She is a professor at the Department of Literature, Area Studies, and European Languages, University of Oslo. Among her literary interests are Nobel Prize laureate Sigrid Undset. She is a member of the Norwegian Academy of Science and Letters, the Royal Norwegian Society of Sciences and Letters, and the Norwegian Academy for Language and Literature.

She resides in Fagerborg, Oslo.
