= Ljan Church =

Coordinates: 59°50′46.43″N 10°47′3.09″E

- Ljan kirke
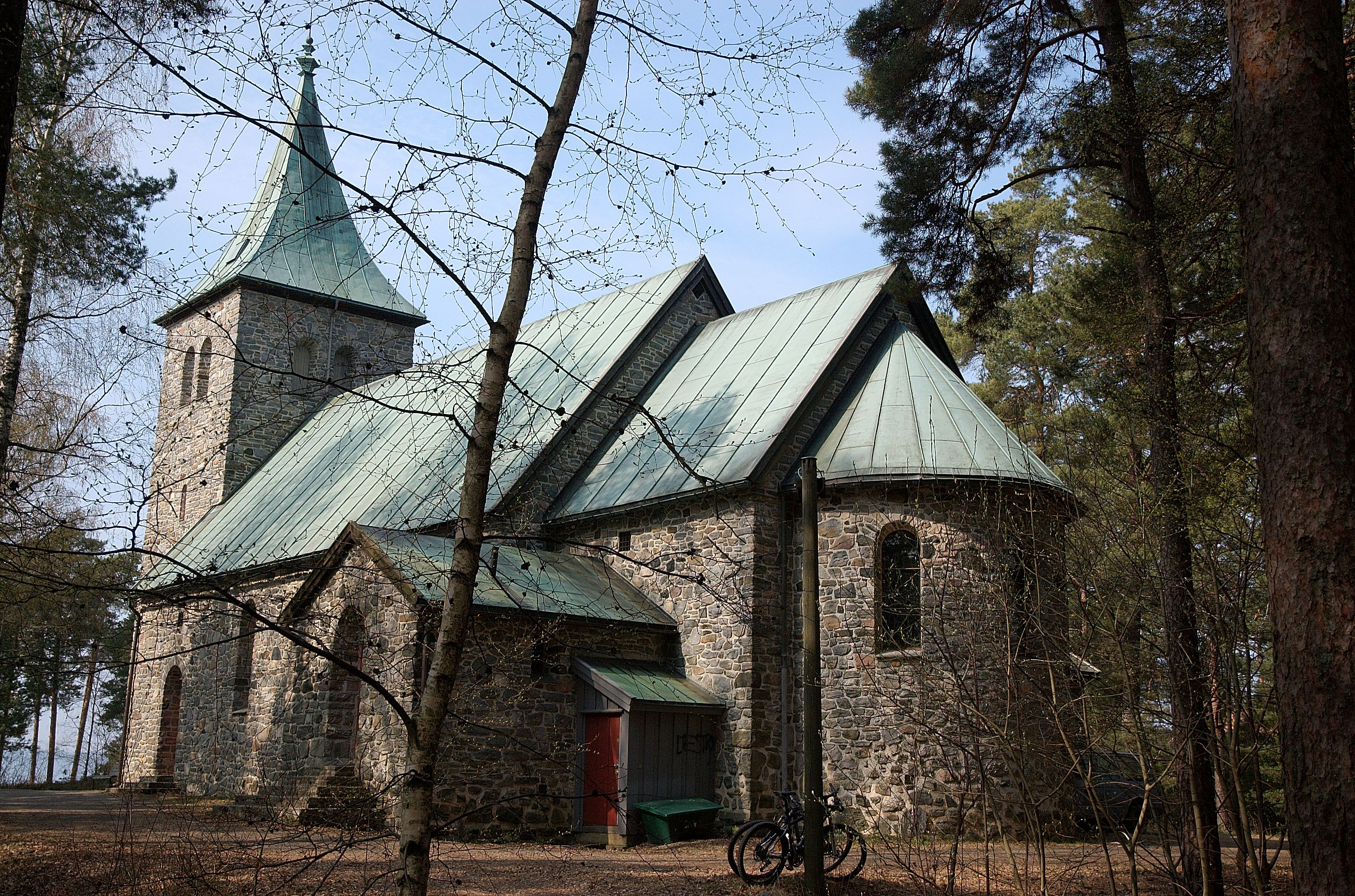
- Ljan Church
- Location: Nordstrand; Oslo,
- Country: Norway
- Denomination: Church of Norway
- Churchmanship: Evangelical Lutheran
- Website: www.oslo.kirken.no

History
- Status: Parish church
- Consecrated: April 10, 1932

Architecture
- Functional status: Active
- Architect: Olav Olson
- Style: neo-Romanesque

Specifications
- Materials: Stone

Administration
- Diocese: Diocese of Oslo
- Deanery: Søndre Aker
- Parish: Ljan

Ljan Church (Norwegian: Ljan kirke) is a parish church of the Church of Norway in the district of Nordstrand in Oslo, Norway.

The church was consecrated on 10 April 1932 and is shrouded by pine trees on a hill. Later a parish center was built just below. The architectural style is neo-Romanesque and medieval inspired. There are no signs of modernism. The architect was Olav Olson (1879-1945).

It is a relatively small church in stone. The church tower is at the entrance. The choir is narrow. It has two sacristies. The roof is covered with copper plates. Sculptor Trygve Dammen (1900-1973) made the pulpit and baptismal font, a wooden sculpture and created wooden sculptures under the ceiling. There are stained glass in all the windows, composed by artist Rolf Klemetsrud (1900-1956). Wrought Iron works in windows and altar ring is by Karl Bilgrei (1898-1990). The crucifix over the main entrance is made by Halfdan Davidsen. The two church bells are made by Olsen Nauen Bell Foundry in Tønsberg.

Ljan Church is listed as protected by the Norwegian Directorate for Cultural Heritage.
