= Katten (beach) =

Beach in Oslo, Norway

Coordinates: 59°49′58″N 10°46′21″E

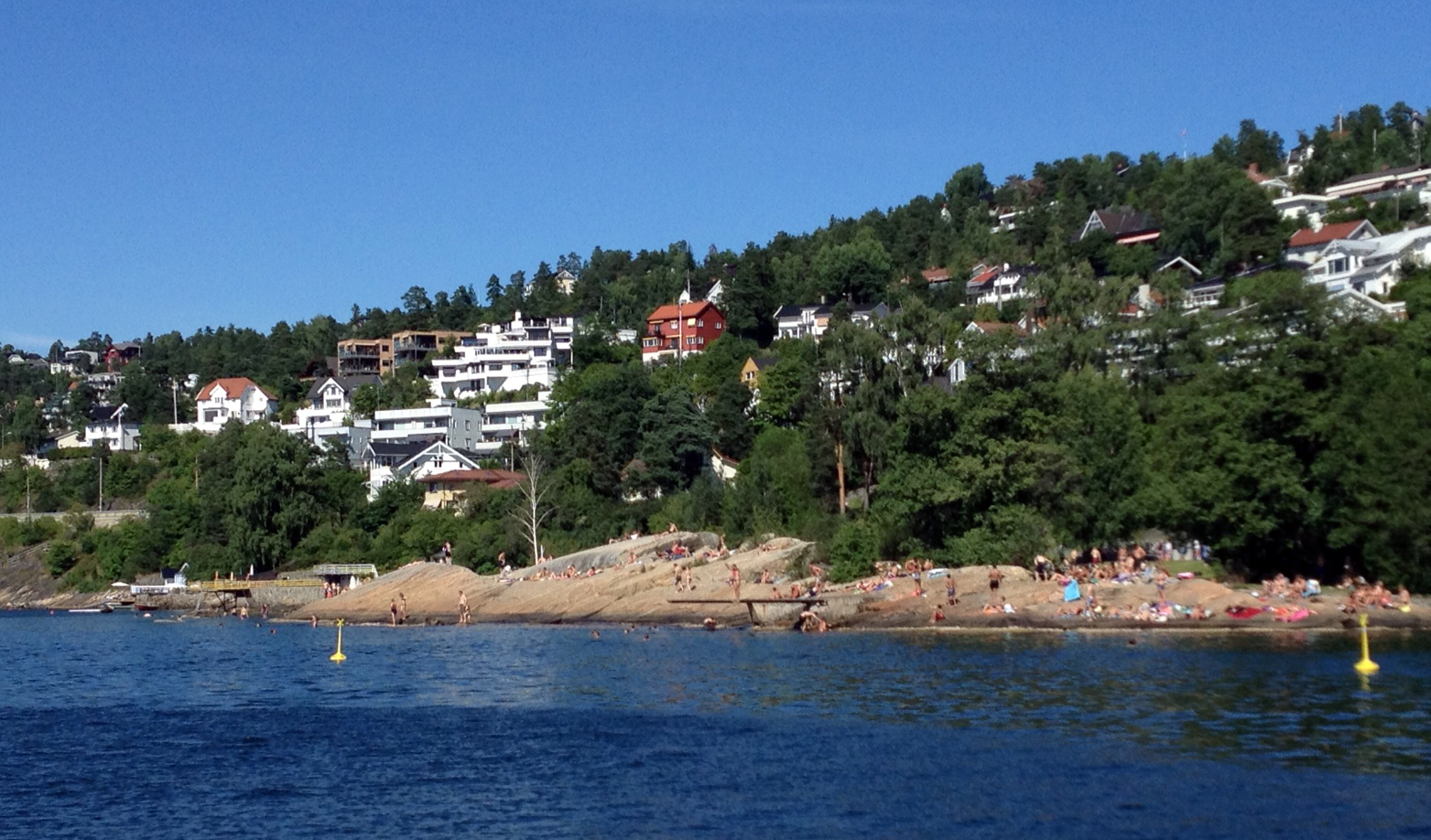
Katten Beach in Oslo, seen from the seaside

Katten is a municipal beach in Bunnefjorden in the Nordstrand area in Oslo, Norway. The beach is suitable for children and comprises a sheltered, sandy beach, rocks and grassy hills. There are diving boards, swimming ladders, tables and benches, toilets, showers, drinking water and a kiosk.

There are very limited parking facilities, but there is a bus stop on Mosseveien right by. In the summer months there is also a separate "bathing bus" (busline no. 87). There is also a footpath downhill to Katten from Ljan Station.
