= Maren Juel =

Norwegian landowner

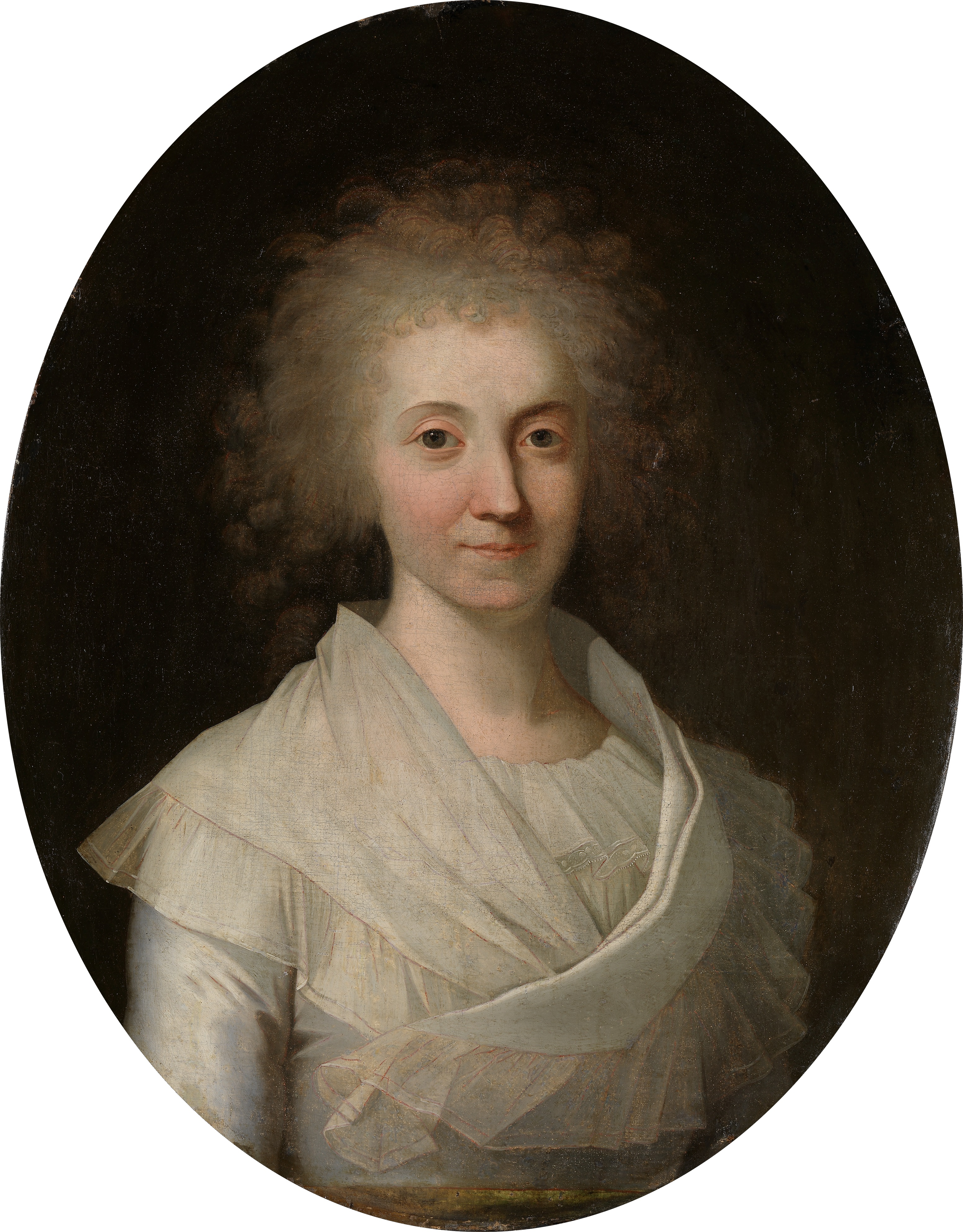
- Born: 18 March 1749; Christiania, Norway
- Died: 20 February 1815 (aged 65)
- Occupation: Landowner
- Spouse(s): Ole Christopher Wessel; Marcus Gjøe Rosenkrantz
- Relatives: Jacob Juel (brother); Jacob Rasch (grandfather)

Maren Juel (18 March 1749 – 20 February 1815) was a Norwegian landowner, regarded as the wealthiest woman in Norway at her time.

She was born in Christiania (now Oslo) as the daughter of timber trader and civil servant Hans Juel (1702–1765). She was the sister of timber trader, Jacob Juel. In 1771 she was married to businessman and landowner Peder Holter (1723 - 1786). He had accumulated a number of estates and was regarded one of the wealthiest men in the country at the time. After her husband's death in 1786, she managed the properties herself. These included Losby in Lørenskog as well as the estates Hafslund and Borregaard in Sarpsborg and the Ljan Estate (Ljansbruket) which included Stubljan in Nordstrand and Hvitebjørn in Oppegård.

In 1791 she married civil servant Ole Christopher Wessel who died in 1794. In 1796 Juel married Marcus Gjøe Rosenkrantz, later member of the Parliament of Norway and Government Minister. She had no children. Her heirs included her niece, Gjertrud Maren Juel who was married to Lars Ingier. In several Norwegian cities, there are streets named after her.

== Related Reading ==
- Schulerud, Mentz (1974) Hafslund gods: Fra Otte Bildt til M. G. Rosenkrantz (Oslo: Aschehoug) ISBN 978-8203062643
