= Gjersjøen =

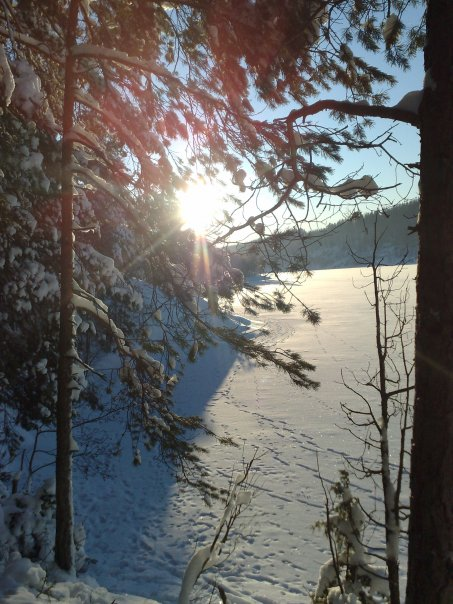

- Location within Akershus
- Location: Akershus county, Norway
- Coordinates: 59.7833°N 10.7833°E
- Type: Natural lake
- Basin countries: Norway
- Surface area: 2.6 km^{2} (1.0 sq mi)
- Surface elevation: 40 m (130 ft)

Gjersjøen is a lake in the municipalities Nordre Follo and Ås in Akershus county, Norway. It has a surface area of 2.6 km^{2} (1.0 sq mi), and is 40 m above sea level. The lake drains through Gjersjøelva to Bunnefjorden.
