= Nordre Follo =

Nordre Follo Municipality Nordre Follo kommune Northern Follo
- Municipality
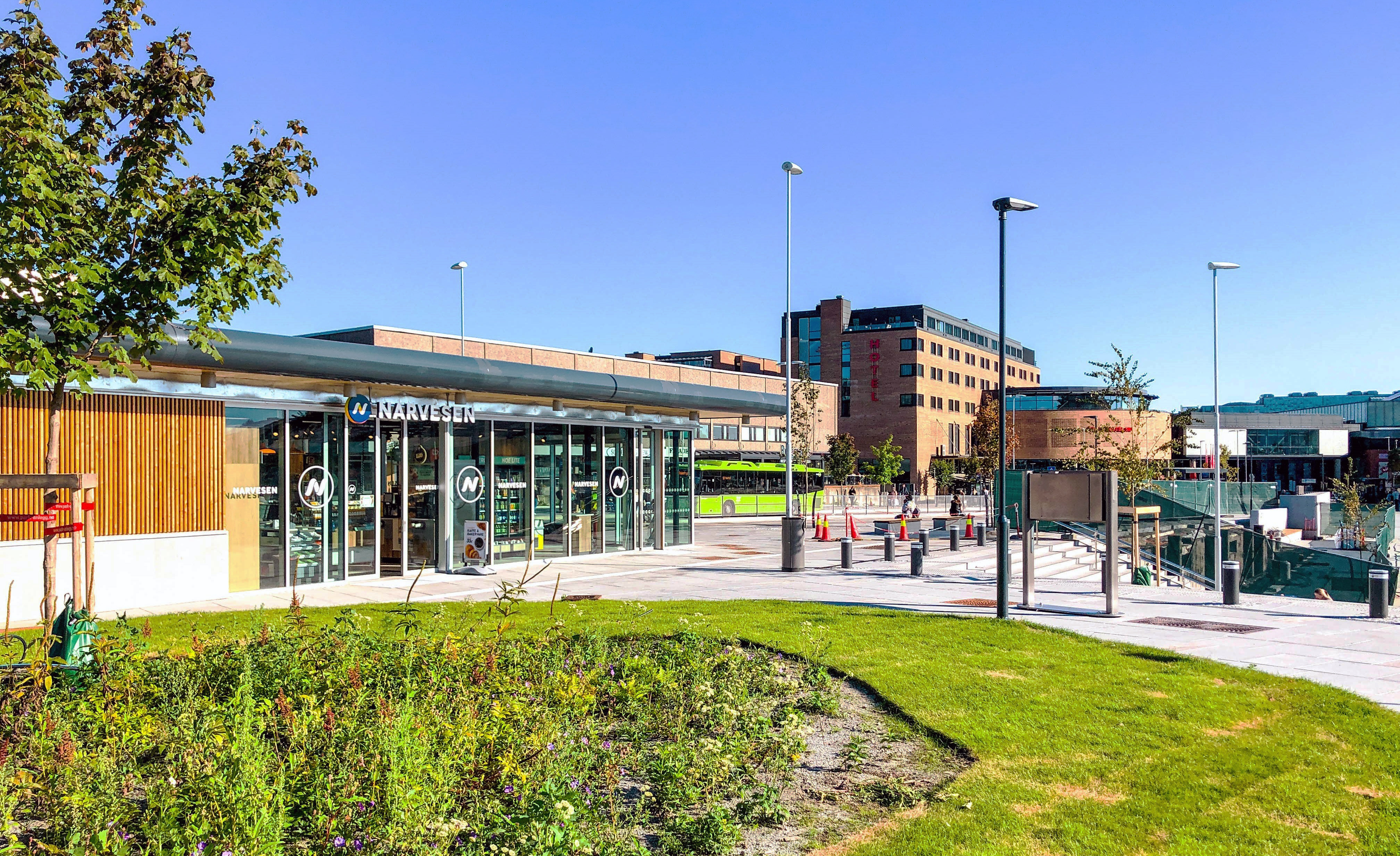
- View of Ski from the railway station park. Photo: Jacob Bolin Lund

- Coat of arms

- Akershus within Norway

- Nordre Follo within Akershus
- Coordinates: 59°45′00″N 10°52′00″E
- Country: Norway
- County: Akershus
- District: Follo
- Administrative centre: Ski

Government
  - Mayor: Cecilie Pind (Conservative Party)
- Demonym: nordrefolloing

Official language
  - Norwegian form: Neutral
- Time zone: UTC+01:00 (CET)
  - Summer (DST): UTC+02:00 (CEST)
- ISO 3166 code: NO-3207

Nordre Follo is a municipality in Akershus county. Norway. Nordre Follo was established on 1 January 2020 by the merging of Ski and Oppegård municipalities.

== Environment ==
Contaminants from thousands of truckloads of slate (that were dumped on two properties that were not prepared as waste sites), are constantly leaking into stream Snipetjernsbekken, which flows into Lake Gjersjøen—the fresh water source for around 49,500 people in Oppegård and the municipality Ås; the stream has [a high concentration, or] much heavy metals and the pH is low. The magnitude of the problem has been known since 2006. In 2022, the government started its case-work thru Environment Agency and Radiation Protection Authority.
