= Bunnefjorden =

Fjord in Norway

Coordinates: 59°52′N 10°44′E

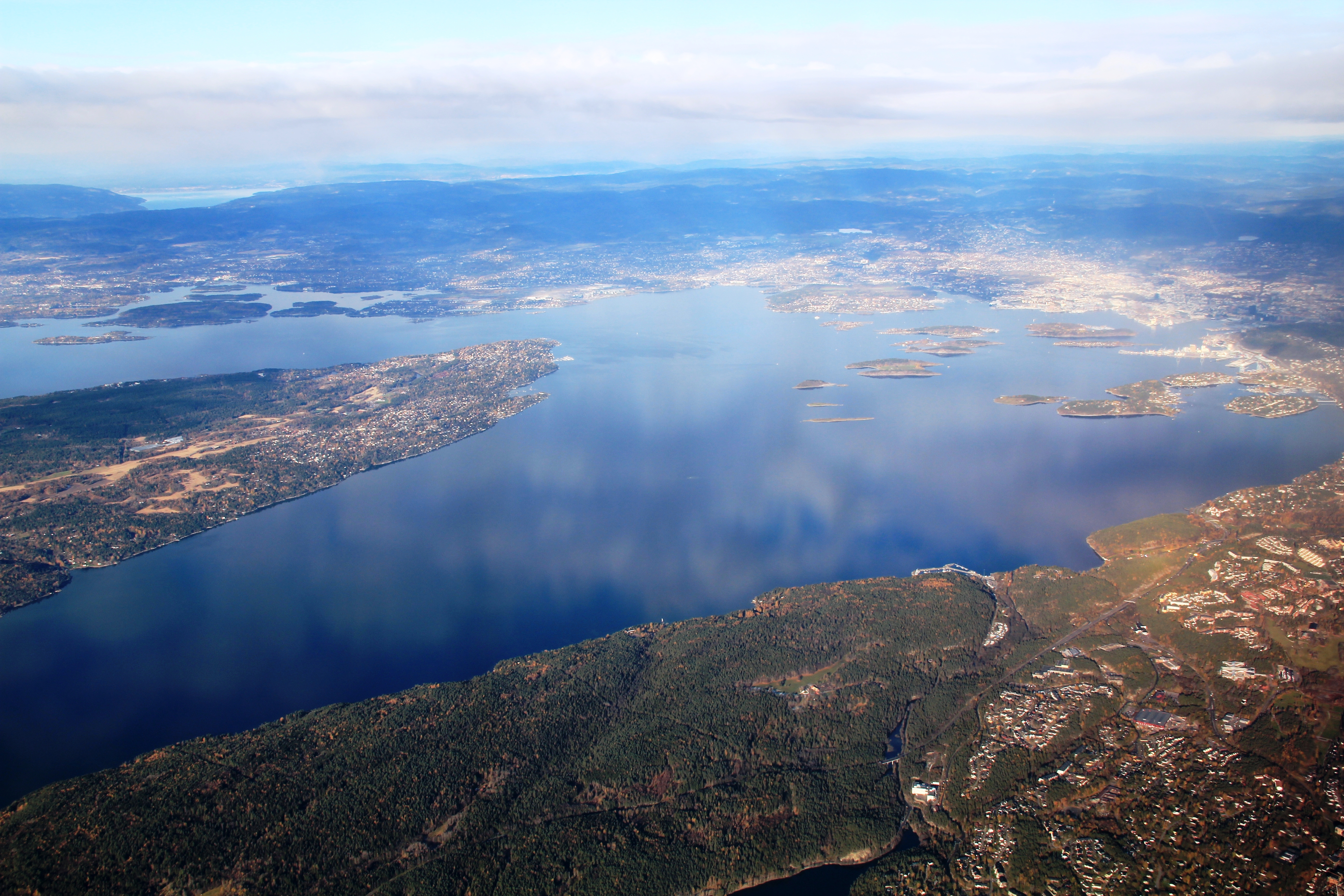
Areal view of Bunnefjorden.

Bunnefjorden, sometimes referred to as Bunne Fjord, is a part of the Oslofjord in south eastern Norway, located east of the Nesodden peninsula. The Bunne Fjord is flanked by the municipalities of Oslo in the north east, Nordre Follo to the east, Ås to the south east, Frogn to the south west, and Nesodden to the west.

The Bunne Fjord has a very long water residence time, and the water is of poor quality.

The significant islands in the Bunne Fjord are Langøyene, Malmøya, Ulvøya, Ormøya, Gressholmen, and Husbergøya.
