= List of villages in Akershus =

This is a list of villages in Akershus, a county of Norway. For other counties see the lists of villages in Norway.

The list excludes cities located in Akershus.

Place	Coordinates	Postal code	Municipality
Algarheim	60°9′0″N 11°15′0″E	2056	Ullensaker
Alværn	59°49′10″N 10°37′14″E	1453	Nesodden
Ask	60°5′0″N 11°2′0″E	2022	Gjerdrum
Asker	59°50′0″N 10°26′0″E	1384	Asker
Askkroken		1482	Nittedal
Aulifeltet	60°2′0″N 11°24′0″E	1929	Nes
Aursmoen (Aurskog)	59°55′29″N 11°26′51″E	1930	Aurskog-Høland
Bekkeberga		2022	Gjerdrum
Bekkestua	59°55′5″N 10°35′20″E	1356	Bærum
Berger	59°49′56″N 10°41′32″E	1450	Nesodden
Billingstad	59°52′29″N 10°28′59″E	1396	Asker
Bjerkås		1391	Asker
Bjørkelangen	59°53′0″N 11°34′0″E	1940	Aurskog-Høland
Bjørnemyr	59°50′N 10°38′E	1453	Nesodden
Blaker	60°0′14″N 11°18′6″E	1925	Sørum
Blakstad	59°49′9″N 10°28′29″E	1392	Asker
Blommenholm		1365	Bærum
Blylaget	59°46′38″N 10°42′24″E	1450	Nesodden
Blystadlia	59°55′50″N 11°2′7″E	2014	Rælingen
Bodung		2150	Nes
Bomannsvik		1450	Nesodden
Borgen	59°49′16″N 10°25′22″E	1388	Asker
Brevik	59°45′8″N 10°42′35″E	1455	Frogn
Bråtesletta	60°3′0″N 11°3′0″E	2022	Gjerdrum
Brudalen (Gardermoen)	60°10′0″N 11°6′0″E	2060	Ullensaker
Brårud	60°12′37″N 11°19′57″E	2162	Nes
Burås		1488	Nittedal
Bærums Verk	59°57′0″N 10°30′0″E	1353	Bærum
Bærumsmarka		1350	Bærum
Bøn	60°17′0″N 11°12′0″E	2073	Eidsvoll
Borgen	60°5′0″N 11°13′0″E	2040	Ullensaker
Dal	60°15′0″N 11°12′0″E	2072	Eidsvoll
Dalsroa		1970	Aurskog-Høland
Danskerud		1430	Ås
Dikemark		1385	Asker
Drengsrud		1385	Asker
Drøbak	59°39′48″N 10°37′52″E	1440	Frogn
Dønski		1346	Bærum
Eidsvoll	60°19′0″N 11°14′0″E	2080	Eidsvoll
Eidsvoll Verk	60°18′0″N 11°10′0″E	2074	Eidsvoll
Eiksmarka	59°56′48″N 10°37′20″E	1359	Bærum
Eltonåsen	60°8′12″N 11°1′9″E	2034	Nannestad
Enebakk (Kirkebygda)	59°46′27″N 11°6′7″E	1912	Enebakk
Enebakkneset (Neset)	59°47′0″N 11°15′0″E	1910	Fet
Fagerstrand	59°44′5″N 10°35′35″E	1454	Nesodden
Feiring	60°29′0″N 11°9′0″E	2093	Eidsvoll
Fenstad	60°9′0″N 11°25′0″E	2170	Nes
Fetsund	59°56′0″N 11°10′0″E	1900	Fet
Finnbråten		2080	Eidsvoll
Finstadbru	59°57′0″N 11°26′0″E	1930	Aurskog-Høland
Finstadjordet		1475	Lørenskog
Fjellfoten		2150	Nes
Fjellhamar		1472	Lørenskog
Fjellsrud	59°53′0″N 11°13′0″E	1903	Fet
Fjellstad		2009	Rælingen
Fjellstrand, Norway	59°47′43″N 10°36′38″E	1458	Nesodden
Fjerdingby		2008	Rælingen
Flaskebekk	59°51′23″N 10°39′8″E	1450	Nesodden
Flateby	59°50′0″N 11°10′0″E	1911	Enebakk
Fornebu	59°54′8″N 10°37′45″E	1330	Bærum
Fosser	59°49′0″N 11°29′0″E	1963	Aurskog-Høland
Frogner	60°1′0″N 11°6′0″E	2016	Sørum
Gan	59°52′0″N 11°13′0″E	1903	Fet
Garder	60°12′0″N 11°3′0″E	2060	Ullensaker
Gjelleråsen		1481	Nittedal
Gjerdrum (Solheim)	60°5′0″N 11°6′0″E	2022	Gjerdrum
Grav		1358	Bærum
Greverud		1415	Oppegård
Grinitajet		2009	Rælingen
Grønlundfjellet		2022	Gjerdrum
Grønvoll		1487	Nittedal
Gullhella		1386	Asker
Gullverket		2080	Eidsvoll
Haga		1929	Nes
Hagan		1481	Nittedal
Hakadal	60°6′0″N 10°52′0″E	1488	Nittedal
Hallangen		1445	Frogn
Hammerstad	60°20′0″N 11°13′0″E	2080	Eidsvoll
Haslum		1344	Bærum
Hauerseter		2055	Ullensaker
Hanaborg		1472	Lørenskog
Heer		1445	Frogn
Heggedal	59°47′3″N 10°26′31″E	1389	Asker
Hellerud		2013	Skedsmo
Hellvik	59°50′42″N 10°41′22″E	1450	Nesodden
Hemnes	59°43′0″N 11°28′0″E	1970	Aurskog-Høland
Hogsetfeltet		1925	Sørum
Holmen	59°51′23″N 10°29′28″E	1394	Asker
Hosle		1362	Bærum
Hurdal		2090	Hurdal
Hurdal Verk	60°27′0″N 11°3′0″E	2090	Hurdal
Hvam	60°6′0″N 11°23′0″E	2165	Nes
Hvam		2013	Skedsmo
Hvitsten	59°35′54″N 10°39′25″E	1545	Vestby
Hølen	59°32′23″N 10°44′23″E	1550	Vestby
Høvik	59°54′0″N 10°35′0″E	1363	Bærum
Håkavik		1390	Asker
Ingeborgrud	60°14′0″N 11°31′0″E	2164	Nes
Jar	59°55′0″N 10°37′0″E	1358	Bærum
Jessheim	60°9′0″N 11°11′0″E	2050	Ullensaker
Jong	59°53′23″N 10°30′23″E	1341	Bærum
Kampå		2170	Nes
Kirkerud		1339	Bærum
Kjeller	59°59′0″N 11°2′0″E	2007	Skedsmo
Kjenn		1470	Lørenskog
Kjenn		1540	Vestby
Kjul		1480	Nittedal
Kjøvangen	59°32′26″N 10°39′58″E	1555	Vestby
Kjøya		1407	Ås
Kløfta	60°4′0″N 11°9′0″E	2040	Ullensaker
Kolbotn	59°48′41″N 10°47′54″E	1410	Oppegård
Kolsås	59°55′0″N 10°31′0″E	1352	Bærum
Konglungen	59°50′19″N 10°30′25″E	1392	Asker
Kringler		2032	Nannestad
Kråkstad		1408	Ski
Kurland		2006	Lørenskog
Langhus		1405	Ski
Langset	60°24′0″N 11°15′0″E	2092	Eidsvoll
Leirsund	60°0′0″N 11°6′0″E	2015	Skedsmo
Lierfoss	59°55′0″N 11°33′0″E	1933	Aurskog-Høland
Lindeberg	60°2′0″N 11°8′0″E	2016	Sørum
Lommedalen		1350	Bærum
Lundermoen	60°1′0″N 11°9′0″E	1923	Sørum
Lysaker	59°54′0″N 10°36′0″E	1366	Bærum
Løkeberg		1344	Bærum
Løken	59°48′0″N 11°29′0″E	1960	Aurskog-Høland
Løkenfeltet	60°9′0″N 11°3′0″E	2034	Nannestad
Lørenfallet	60°1′0″N 11°13′0″E	1923	Sørum
Løstad		1484	Nittedal
Løvenstad		2006	Rælingen
Maura	60°15′0″N 11°1′0″E	2032	Nannestad
Minnesund	60°23′0″N 11°14′0″E	2092	Eidsvoll
Mogreina		2054	Ullensaker
Momoen		1960	Aurskog-Høland
Movatn		0891	Oslo
Nerdrum		1925	Sørum
Nesbru	59°52′13″N 10°29′29″E	1394	Asker
Neskollen		2165	Nes
Nesoddtangen	59°52′0″N 10°39′0″E	1450	Nesodden
Nesset		1455	Ås
Nesøya	59°51′45″N 10°30′1″E	1397	Asker
Nordby	59°43′11″N 10°46′22″E	1407	Ås
Nordbyhagen		1474	Lørenskog
Nordkisa	60°11′0″N 11°16′0″E	2055	Ullensaker
Oksval	59°51′38″N 10°40′14″E	1450	Nesodden
Onsrud		2056	Ullensaker
Oppegård		1415	Oppegård
Oppåkermoen		2166	Nes
Pepperstad skog		1540	Vestby
Rasta		1476	Lørenskog
Rotnes	60°3′0″N 10°53′0″E	1482	Nittedal
Rud		1351	Bærum
Rustadbruk	60°21′0″N 11°0′0″E	2090	Hurdal
Rustadmoen		2030	Nannestad
Rykkinn		1349	Bærum
Rælingen		2005	Rælingen
Røykås		1473	Lørenskog
Råholt	60°16′0″N 11°11′0″E	2070	Eidsvoll
Rånåsfoss	60°2′0″N 11°20′0″E	1927	Sørum
Sand	60°9′0″N 11°8′0″E	2050	Ullensaker
Sem	59°51′0″N 10°24′0″E	1384	Asker
Sessvollmoen	60°15′0″N 11°10′0″E	2058	Ullensaker
Seterstøa	60°10′0″N 11°34′0″E	2150	Nes
Setskog		1954	Aurskog-Høland
Siggerud		1404	Ski
Sjøstrand		1391	Asker
Sjøstrand		1450	Nesodden
Skaugum		1384	Asker
Skedsmokorset	60°1′0″N 11°2′30″E	2020	Skedsmo
Skiphelle	59°38′14″N 10°38′41″E	1444	Frogn
Skjetten		2013	Skedsmo
Skotbu	59°40′0″N 10°57′0″E	1409	Ski
Skrukkelia		2090	Hurdal
Skui		1340	Bærum
Skulerud	59°40′0″N 11°33′0″E	1970	Aurskog-Høland
Skytta	60°0′0″N 10°55′0″E	1481	Nittedal
Skårer	59°57′0″N 11°10′0″E	1475	Lørenskog
Slattum	60°0′0″N 10°55′0″E	1480	Nittedal
Slattumhagen	60°11′0″N 11°0′0″E	2033	Nannestad
Slependen		1341	Bærum
Smestad		2008	Rælingen
Snarøya		1367	Bærum
Sofiemyr		1412	Oppegård
Solberg		1385	Asker
Solemskogen		0496	Oslo
Son	59°31′23″N 10°41′21″E	1555	Vestby
Spro	59°45′39″N 10°35′10″E	1454	Nesodden
Stabekk	59°54′27″N 10°36′20″E	1369	Bærum
Store Brevik		1555	Vestby
Strømmen	59°57′0″N 11°0′0″E	2010	Skedsmo
Styrigrenda	60°18′0″N 11°17′0″E	2080	Eidsvoll
Sundbyhagen		2160	Nes
Svarterud		1910	Fet
Svartskog	59°46′44″N 10°44′4″E	1420	Oppegård
Svestad	59°46′34″N 10°35′35″E	1458	Nesodden
Sværsvann		1404	Ski
Sørumsand	59°58′0″N 11°15′0″E	1920	Sørum
Såner		1550	Vestby
Tanum		1341	Bærum
Teigebyen (Nannestad)	60°5′0″N 11°2′0″E	2030	Nannestad
Togrenda		1407	Ås
Torget (Hurdal Torg)	60°26′0″N 11°4′0″E	2090	Hurdal
Torget		1450	Nesodden
Trandum		2059	Ullensaker
Trollåsen		1414	Oppegård
Tårnåsen		1413	Oppegård
Ursvik	59°51′16″N 10°40′38″E	1450	Nesodden
Vardeåsen		2020	Sørum
Vestby	59°36′0″N 10°45′0″E	1540	Vestby
Vettre		1392	Asker
Vevelstad		1405	Ski
Vinterbro		1407	Ås
Visperud		1476	Lørenskog
Voll		1358	Bærum
Vollen	59°48′38″N 10°28′57″E	1390	Asker
Vormsund	60°9′0″N 11°26′0″E	2160	Nes
Vøyenenga		1339	Bærum
Ytre Enebakk		1914	Enebakk
Østerås		1361	Bærum
Åkrene		2000	Fet
Åneby	60°5′0″N 10°52′0″E	1484	Nittedal
Årnes	60°9′0″N 11°28′0″E	2150	Nes
Ås	59°40′0″N 10°48′0″E	1430	Ås
Åsgreina (Åsgrenda)		2033	Nannestad
