= Thomas Frigård =

Norwegian investigative journalist and former footballer (born 1972)

- Born: Thomas André Frigård; 5 November 1972 (age 53); Vormsund, Norway
- Education: University of Oslo; University of Klagenfurt
- Occupations: Footballer (retired); investigative journalist
- Notable credit: Investigative reporting on municipal issues
Association football career
- Position: Midfielder
Youth career
- Fu/Vo
- Lillestrøm
Senior career*
Years	Team	Apps	(Gls)
1992	Lillestrøm	0	(0)
1993	Eidsvold Turn		
1994–1997	Stabæk	66	(8)
1998	Start	14	(1)
1999–2000	FC Kärnten	27	(3)
2000–2002	SV Spittal/Drau		
2002–2004	SVG Bleiburg		
2004	Ull/Kisa		
2005–2008	Eidsvold Turn		
- * Club domestic league appearances and goals

Thomas Frigård (born 5 November 1972) is a Norwegian journalist and former professional footballer.

== Football career ==
Hailing from Vormsund, he is a younger brother of Geir Frigård. He played youth football for Fu/Vo and Lillestrøm SK. After his first senior season he continued his career in Eidsvold TF. From 1994 to 1997 he played 66 league games and scored eight goals for Stabæk. Seven of the goals came in the 1994 1. divisjon, one goal in the Eliteserien. In 1997 he played only six minutes of league football, two cup games and two games in the 1997 UEFA Intertoto Cup, scoring against Genk. He joined IK Start post-season.

After a year in Start he joined FC Kärnten (then called Austria Klagenfurt) in January 1999. He scored three goals in 27 appearances (21 starts) in the 1999–00 Austrian second tier. After one and a half seasons there he played two seasons for SV Spittal/Drau and two for SVG Bleiburg. In 2004 he played for Ullensaker/Kisa IL, and from 2005 through 2008 for Eidsvold TF.

== Investigative journalism ==
During the latter part of his footballing career, Frigård started working as a journalist for local Nes i Akershus newspaper Raumnes. Gaining a reputation as a investigative journalist, in 2018 he was hired by Kommunal Rapport.
