= Skogbygda, Akershus =

Skogbygda
- Village
- Interactive map of Skogbygda
- Coordinates: 60°13′43″N 11°30′55″E
- Time zone: UTC+01:00 (CET)

Skogbygda is a small community in the municipality of Nes in Akershus, Norway. The name "Skogbygda" is derived from Skog = forest, Bygd = village in Norwegian.

The center of the community lies in Ingeborgrud, with an elementary school, a convenience store/post office, hairdresser, and football field. The local church and a firing range is also located near Ingeborgrud. Outside Ingeborgrud the landscape is typically rural, with farmlands and considerable areas of forest.

The 313 bus from Skarnes to Oslo goes through Dysterud, Skogbygda, Herbergåsen, Opaker, Vormsund, Rød, Langbakk, Borgen and Skibakk.
