= Hvam =

Hvam may refer to:

== People ==
- Frank Hvam (born 1970), Danish comedian
- Hjalmar Hvam (1902–1996), Norwegian-American Nordic skier and inventor of the first safety ski binding

== Places ==
- Hvam, Nes, Akershus, Norway
- Hvam, Skedsmo, Akershus, Norway
- Hvam, one of the archaic names for the Kingdom of Khotan, an ancient Silk Road civilization
