= Smestad =

Smestad may refer to the following locations:

- Smestad, Oslo in Oslo, Norway
  - Smestad (station), a metro station in Oslo.
- Smestad, Akershus in Rælingen, Akershus, Norway
