= Borghild Holmsen =

Norwegian pianist, music critic and composer (1865–1938)

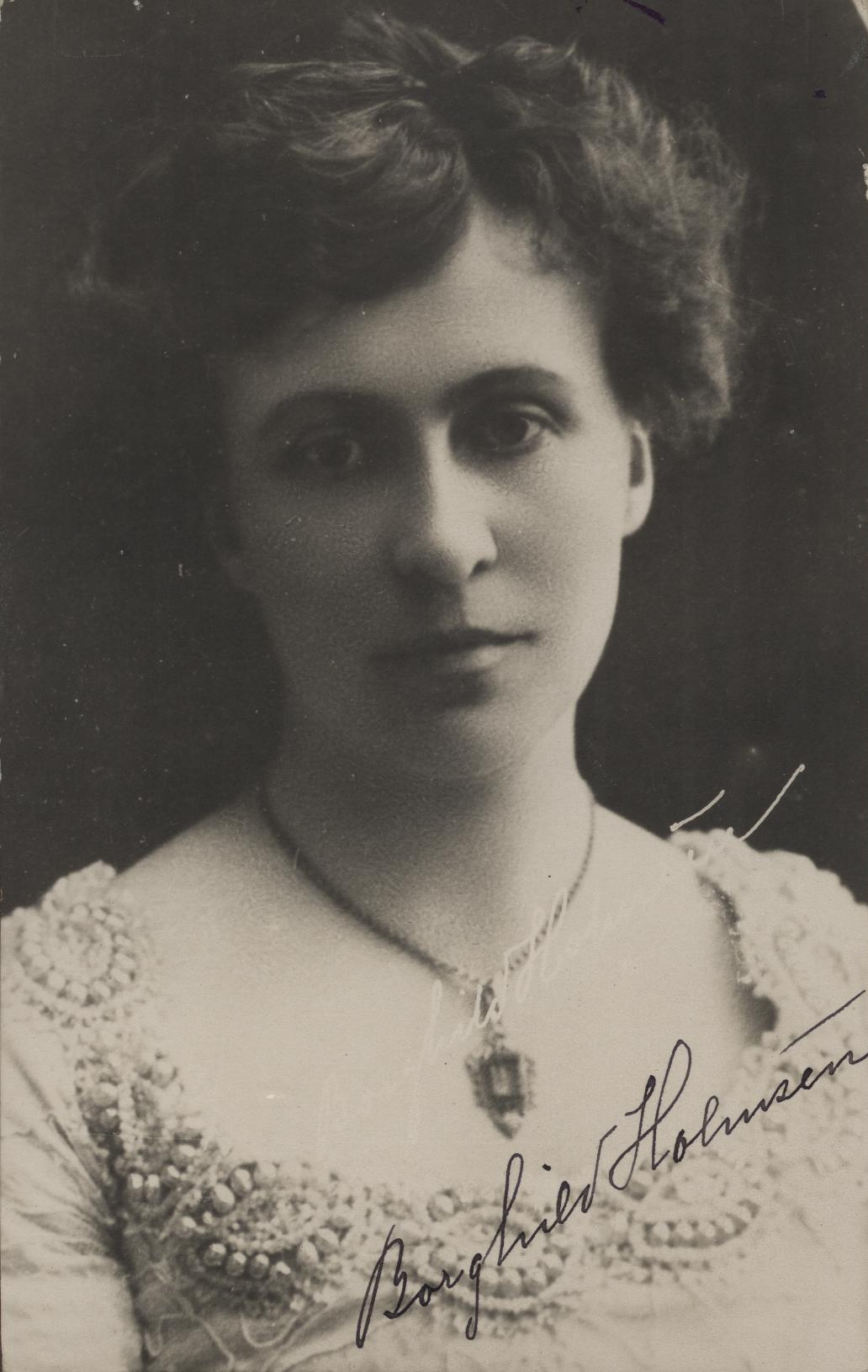
- Born: 22 October 1865; Vevelstad, Akershus, Norway
- Died: 4 December 1938 (aged 73); Bergen, Vestland, Norway
- Occupations: Pianist, composer, teacher, music critic

Borghild Holmsen (22 October 1865 – 4 December 1938) was a Norwegian pianist, teacher, music critic and composer. She is thought to be the first Norwegian woman to perform a concert featuring only her own compositions.

== Early life and education ==
Borghild Holmsen was born on 22 October 1865 in Vevelstad, Akershus to proprietor Thorvald Holmsen. When she was 7 years old, her family settled in Christiania (now Oslo). She began playing the piano at an early age and soon began composing compositions. Holmsen studied piano with Agathe Backer-Grøndahl and Otto Winter-Hjelm, and then in 1885 joined the Music Conservatory in Leipzig where she was tutored by Carl Reinecke and Salomon Jadassohn, as well as by Albert Becker in Berlin. She made her debut in 1890 in Christiania. Her first work, a violin sonata in G major, was performed at one of the conservatory's public student concerts, which received positive attention. Despite this, she was rejected for a scholarship to further her studies. Holmsen remained in Leipzig, where she became a piano teacher. But she still continued to perform concerts during this time, including a matinee in December 1895 at the Blüthner-Saal in Berlin. Between 1890 and 1906, Holmsen submitted eight scholarship applications, which were all rejected.

== Career ==
In 1898, she gave a composition evening in Christiania, where she was performed her own compositions, and was probably the first Norwegian woman to do so. Holmsen also performed composition evenings in Leipzig and Dresden as well as another in Christiania in 1904.

Holmsen also toured as a concert pianist in Europe and the United States. After ending her concert career, she became a teacher at the Bergen Music Conservatory, where Harald Sæverud was one of her pupils. She also worked as a music critic for the newspapers, Bergens Aftenblad and Bergens Arbeiderblad. She also a contributor to the establishment of the Bergen Music Library.

== Later life and death ==
In 1911, she performed a lecture on Old Norse at the 1000th anniversary celebration of Normandy in Rouen. Holmsen also received the Officier d'Akademie.

Holmsen died on 4 December 1938 in Bergen, at the age of 73.

== Works ==
Selected works include:

- Violin Sonata, Op. 10
- Barcarolle, Op.1, No. 1
- Scherzo, Op. 1, No. 2
