= Granerud =

Granerud is a surname. Notable people with the surname include:

- Halvor Egner Granerud (born 1996), Norwegian ski jumper
- Terje Granerud (born 1951), Norwegian politician
