= Skogbygda =

Skogbygda may refer to the following locations:

- Skogbygda, Akershus, a village in Nes Municipality in Akershus county, Norway
- Skogbygda, Løten, a village in Løten Municipality in Innlandet county, Norway
- Skogbygda, Sel, a village in Sel Municipality in Innlandet county, Norway
