= Nerdrum =

Nerdrum may refer to:

- Odd Nerdrum, a Norwegian figurative painter
- Nerdrum, Sørum, a village in Akershus, Norway
- Nerdrum Station, a railway station located in Fetsund in Fet, Norway on the Kongsvinger Line
