= Terje Granerud =

Norwegian politician (born 1951)

- Born: 29 October 1951 (age 74); Nannestad, Norway
- Occupation: politician
- Years active: 1981–1989
- Known for: member, Parliament of Norway
- Political party: Labour Party
- Parents: Alf Granerud (father); Karen Marie Hoftvedt (mother)

Terje Granerud (born 29 October 1951) is a Norwegian politician for the Labour Party.

Granerud was born in Nannestad to industrial labourer Alf Granerud (1920–1983) and housewife Karen Marie Hoftvedt (1920–1984). He only has high school education, from 1970, and started working as a journalist in 1973. He later became editor-in-chief of Kartellnytt (1978–1979), Romerikes Blad (1989–2002) and Eidsvoll Ullensaker Blad (2007 – present).

He was elected to the Parliament of Norway from Akershus in 1981, and was re-elected on one occasion. He previously served as a deputy representative during the term 1977–1981, during which he met as a regular representative in 1980 meanwhile Helen Marie Bøsterud was appointed to the Brundtland's First Cabinet.

Granerud was a member of the executive committee of Nannestad municipal council from 1975 to 1977. He chaired the municipal party chapter from 1972 to 1975, and the county party chapter from 1980 to 1983. He served as mayor of Rælingen from 2003 to 2007. He continued as a council member until 2009, when he moved to Frogner i Sørum and left Rælingen politics. Granerud has also been a board member of Postverket from 1993 to 1995 and Nedre Romerike Vannverk from 2004 to 2005.
