= Eidsvoll Ullensaker Blad =

Norwegian newspaper

- Owner(s): Amble Investment AS (26,828%); Øyer Vekst AS (14,297%); Ola Holt (2,721%); Leif Saasen (2,394%); Other Shareholders (53,761%)
- Editor: Terje Granerud
- Founded: 1901
- Political alignment: Centre Party; Independent
- Headquarters: Eidsvoll, Norway
- Circulation: 8,178
- Website: www.eub.no

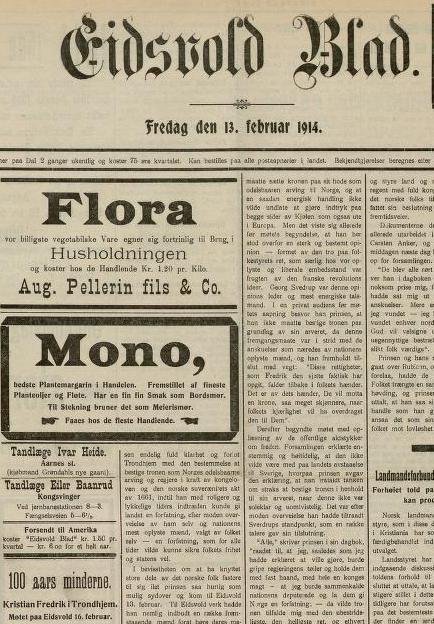
Eidsvoll Ullensaker Bla

Eidsvoll Ullensaker Blad is a local newspaper published in Eidsvoll, Norway.

It was established in 1901 as Eidsvoll Blad, and eventually became affiliated with the Centre Party. It was originally published twice a week; this was increased to three issues in 1930 and four issues in 1969.

It mainly covers the municipalities of Eidsvoll and Hurdal, but is also distributed in Gjerdrum, Ullensaker and Nannestad. It had a circulation of 6,858 in 1983, increasing to the current 8,178, of whom 7,915 are subscribers. It is owned by various local people and groups.
