= Oppåkermoen =

Oppåkermoen Opakermoen
- Village
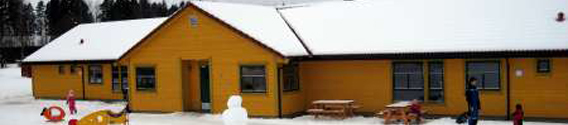
- Image of Opaker Barnehage in Opakermoen, Norway

- Location in Akershus
- Coordinates: 60°10′40″N 11°30′59″E
- Country: Norway
- Region: Østlandet
- County: Akershus
- District: Romerike
- Municipality: Nes

Area
  - Total: 0.48 km^{2} (0.19 sq mi)

Population (2025)
  - Total: 519
  - Density: 1,081.3/km^{2} (2,801/sq mi)
- Data sourced from Statistics Norway (SSB)
- Time zone: UTC+01:00 (CET)
  - Summer (DST): UTC+02:00 (CEST)
- Post Code: 2166 Oppaker

Opakermoen is a village in the municipality of Nes, Akershus, Norway. Its population (2025) is 519, with an area of 0.48 square kilometres.

== Geography ==
Oppåkermoen is situated on the north side of the Glomma river, just east of where the Ua river meets the Glomma. The village lies along the European route E16 highway, approximately 6 kilometres (3.7 mi) east of Vormsund and 8 kilometres (5.0 mi) northeast of the municipal centre of Årnes.

== Economy and infrastructure ==
The village features older industrial developments, including the historical Opakermoen Sawmill (Opakermoen Sagbruk). The Funnefoss Hydroelectric Power Station (Funnefoss kraftverk) operates nearby on the Glomma river.

Local public infrastructure includes the Opaker Childcare Centre (Opaker barnehage) and the Opaker Community Hall (Opaker flerbrukshus).

== Notable people ==
- Tone Rønoldtangen (born 1953), labor union leader and politician who moved to Oppåkermoen while working as an accountant for the Royal Norwegian Air Force.

== Culture ==
The local sports team is Funnefoss/Vormsund IL.
