= Posthum =

Norwegian black metal band

- Origin: Norway
- Genres: Black metal
- Years active: 2004–present
- Labels: Indie Recordings, Folter Records
- Members: Jon Kristian Skare; Morten Edseth; Mats Kjeserud Iversen; Jon Einar Hektoen
- Past members: Martin Wasa Olsen; Vegard Wiik; Morten Opsahl Thomassen
- Website: www.indierecordings.net/artists/artist.php?id=54

Posthum is a black metal band from Nannestad, Norway. The band was founded in 2004 by Jon Kristian Skare (guitar, bass, vocals) and Morten Edseth (drums). The music is more to the ambient/progressive side of the genre than the aggressive, and can be compared to acts like Wolves in the Throne Room, Ulver, or old Enslaved.

== History ==
Their first years from 2004–2008 they mostly focused on rehearsal space and developing their own style. They released their debut album, Posthum on both vinyl and CD on Folter Records in 2009. Later that year they joined Satyricon, Shining and Dark Fortress to do a 21-gig European tour. After another European tour with Nargaroth and Chaos Invocation, Norwegian tour, festival and gigs they recorded their second album in 2011. The album, titled Lights Out, was released on Indie Recordings in September 2012. The following month they did a small tour around Norway with Sòlstafir and Dunderbeist. The Norwegian radio program "Pyro" on NRK P3 named Posthum as one of the most interesting bands from Norway to look out for in 2013.

== Line-up ==
=== Present ===
- Jon Kristian Skare (guitar/bass/vocals) 2004 -
- Morten Edseth (drums) 2004 -
- Mats Kjeserud Iversen (live guitarist) 2012 -
- Jon Einar Hektoen (bass) 2015 -

=== Past ===
- Martin Wasa Olsen (guitar/bass) 2004 - 2012
- Vegard Wiik (bass) 2004 - 2005
- Morten Opsahl Thomassen (vocals) 2004

== Discography ==
Year	Title	Label	Line-up
2009	Posthum	Folter Records	Skare, Edseth, Olsen
2012	Lights Out	Indie Recordings	Skare, Edseth, Olsen
2019	Like Wildfire	Indie Recordings	Skare, Edseth, Hektoen
