= Geir Frigård =

Norwegian footballer (born 1970)

Personal information
- Date of birth: 3 November 1970 (age 55)
- Place of birth: Vormsund, Norway
- Height: 1.84 m (6 ft 0 in)
- Position: Forward

Team information
- Current team: Aalesund (assistant manager)

Youth career
- Funnefoss/Vormsund
- Løvenstad

Senior career*
Years	Team	Apps	(Gls)
1989–1992	Lillestrøm	31	(9)
1993–1994	Kongsvinger	44	(22)
1995–1997	Lillestrøm	60	(22)
1997–1998	LASK	27	(23)
1998–1999	Tennis Borussia Berlin	14	(5)
1999–2000	CS Sedan	13	(1)
2000–2001	LASK	33	(15)
2001–2004	Lierse	56	(10)
2004–2005	HamKam	44	(10)
2006–2007	Eidsvold Turn	17	(12)
Total		339	(129)

International career
1994	Norway	5	(1)

Managerial career
- 2008–2009: Eidsvold Turn
- 2012–2020: Norway (youth)
- 2020–2021: HamKam (assistant)
- 2020: HamKam (caretaker)
- 2022–2023: Rosenborg (assistant)
- 2024: Omonia (assistant)
- 2024–: Aalesund (assistant)
- * Club domestic league appearances and goals

Geir Frigård (born 3 November 1970) is a Norwegian former professional footballer who played as a forward. He played five times for the Norway national team, scoring one goal. In 1997–98, he was top scorer in the Austrian Bundesliga. He retired from playing in 2007.

== International career ==
Frigård made his Norway national team debut in a friendly on 15 January 1994 against USA which Norway lost 2–1. He scored his only goal in a 1–0 win on 7 September 1994 in a UEFA Euro 1996 qualification match against Belarus.

== Coaching career ==
After retiring at the end of 2007, Frigård started his coaching career with Eidsvold Turn. On 21 May 2020, after a lot years coaching various youth national teams, Frigård was presented as the new assistant coach for Hamarkameratene. On 7 August 2020, he was appointed interim head coach after Espen Olsen returned to his role as sporting director. On 15 August 2020, he again became an assistant coach after Kjetil Rekdal was hired as the new head coach.

On 20 December 2021, he was hired as an assistant coach for Rosenborg BK.

== Career statistics ==
=== International goals ===
Scores and results list Norway's goal tally first, score column indicates score after each Frigård goal.

List of international goals scored by Geir Frigård
No.	Date	Venue	Opponent	Score	Result	Competition
1	7 September 1994	Ullevaal Stadion, Oslo, Norway	Belarus	1–0	1–0	UEFA Euro 1996 qualifying

== Honours ==
Individual

- Austrian Bundesliga top scorer: 1998
