= Eltonåsen =

- Village
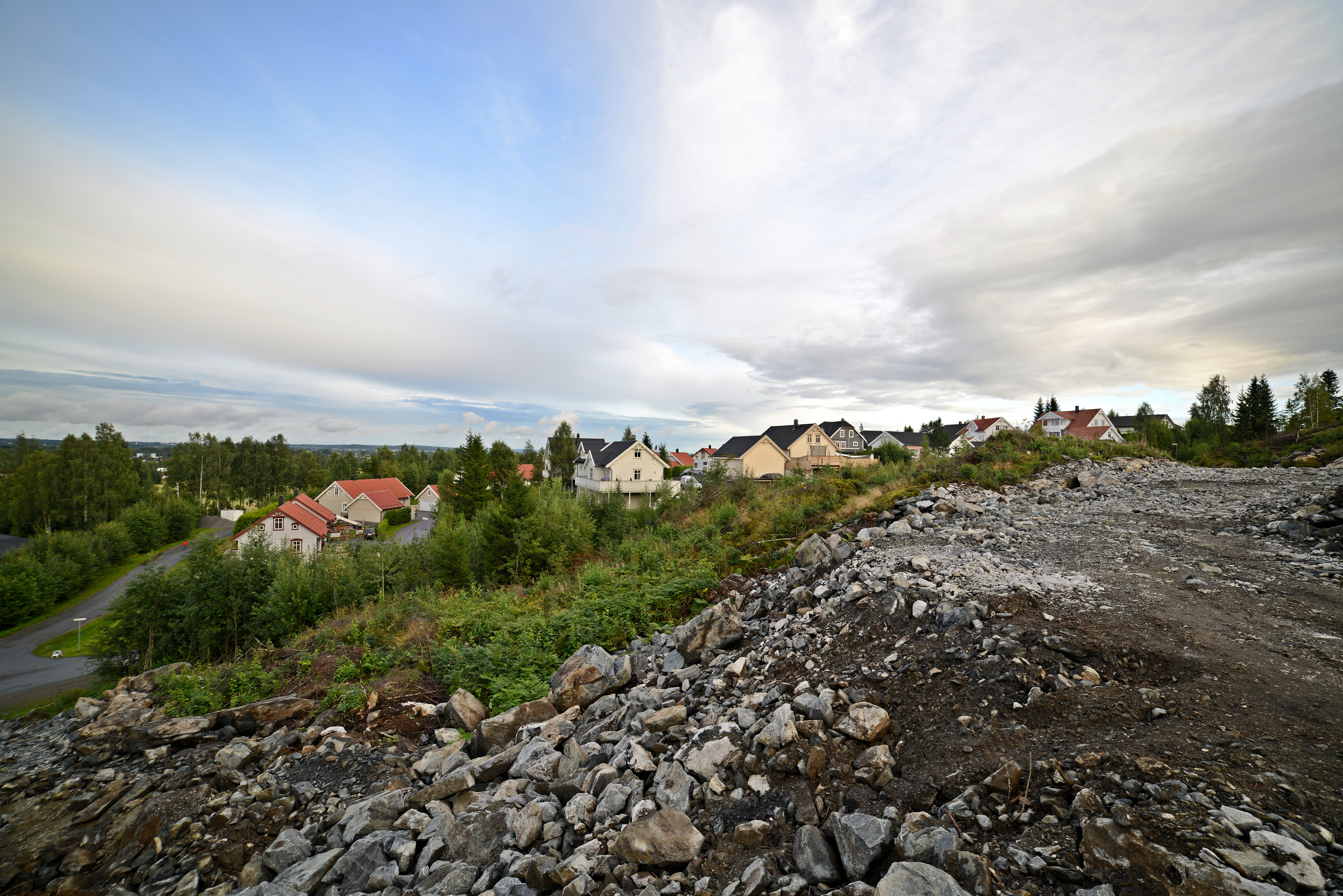

- Location in Akershus
- Coordinates: 60°8′12″N 11°1′9″E
- Country: Norway
- Region: Østlandet
- County: Akershus
- Municipality: Nannestad
- Time zone: UTC+01:00 (CET)
  - Summer (DST): UTC+02:00 (CEST)

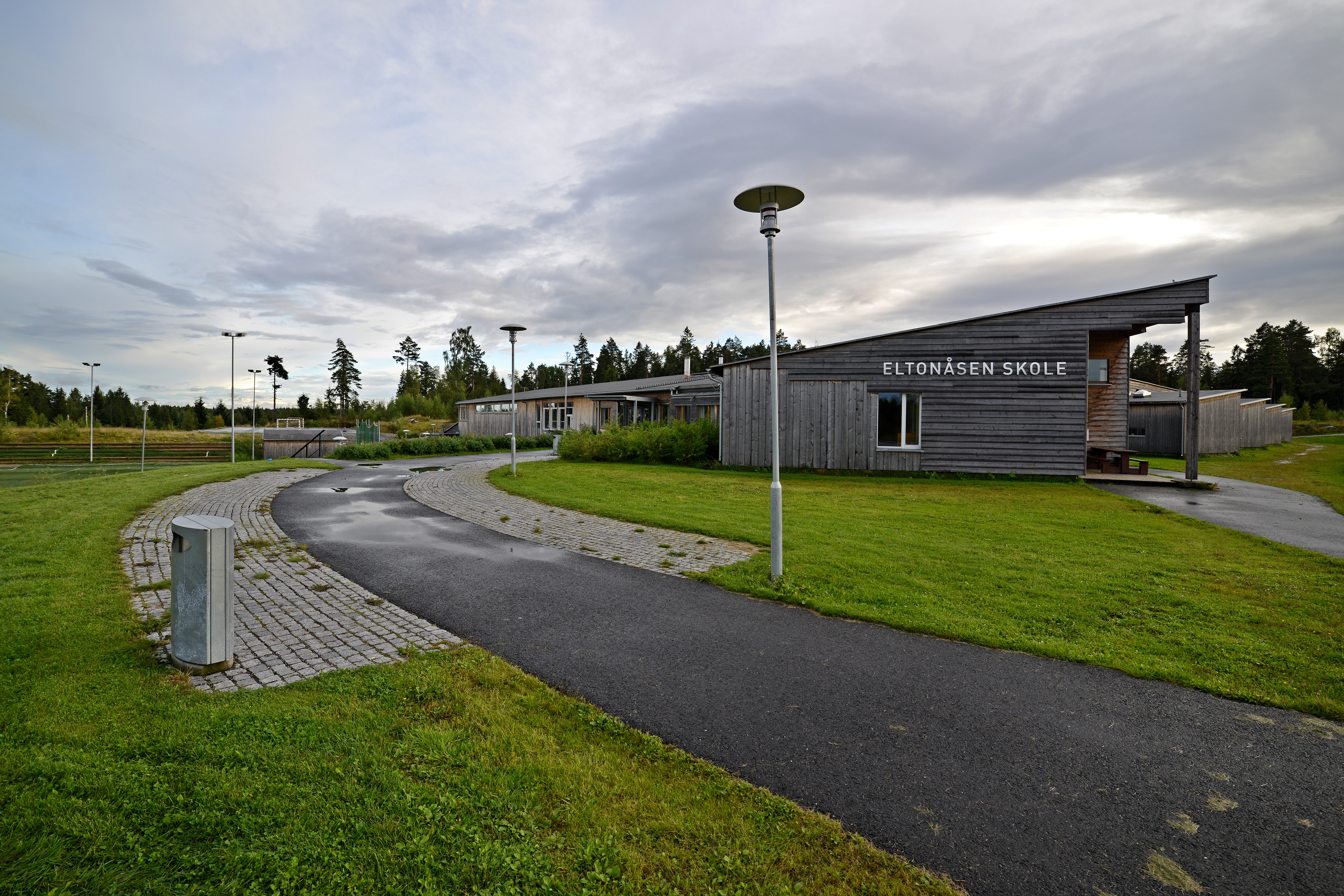
Eltonåsen school

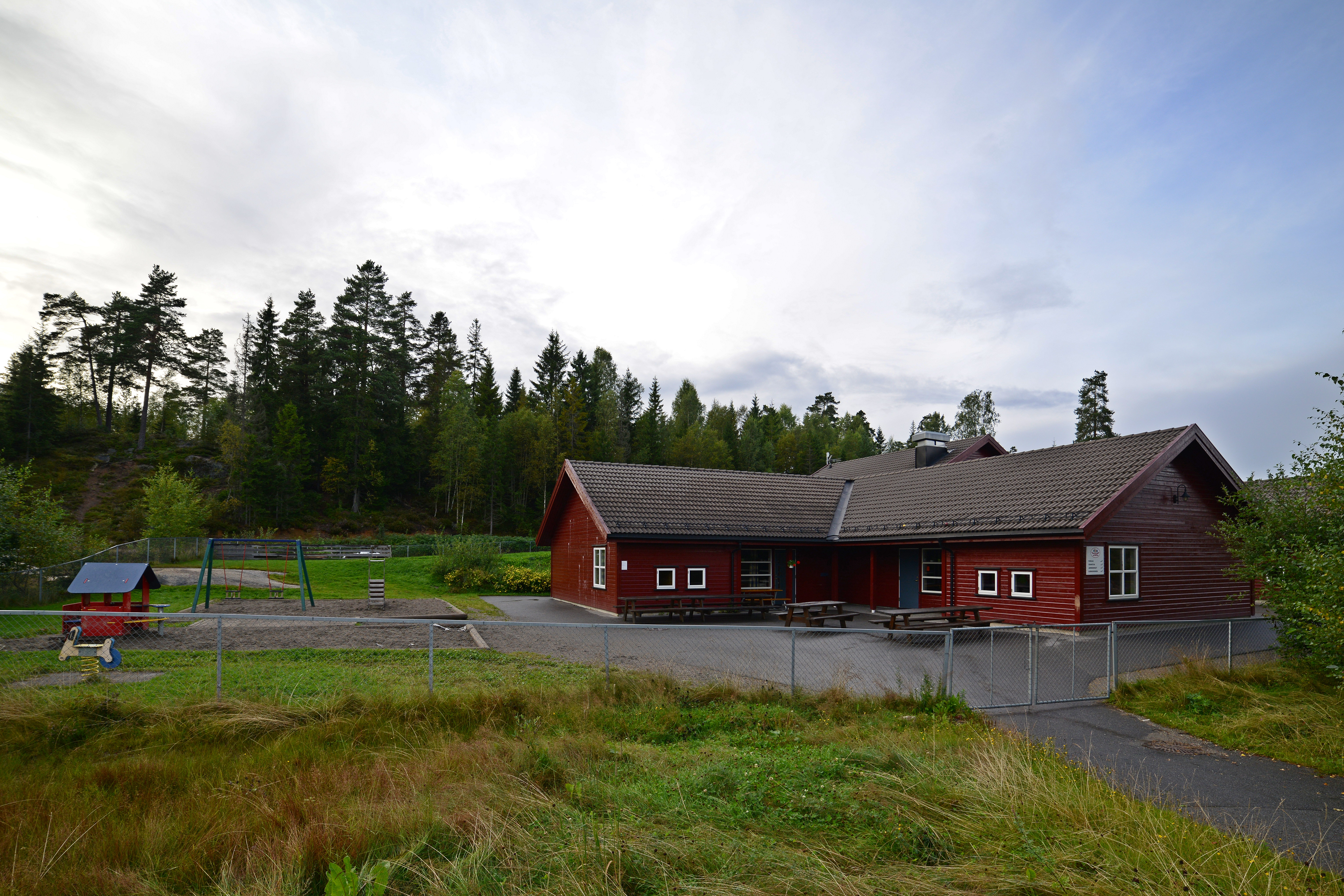
Eltonåsen kindergarten

Eltonåsen is a village in Nannestad municipality, Norway. It is located in Holter in southern Nannestad, west of Løkenfeltet. Its population (2023) is 1742.
