= Sundbyhagen =

- Village
- Location in Akershus
- Coordinates: 60°11′25″N 11°27′19″E
- Country: Norway
- Region: Østlandet
- County: Akershus
- Municipality: Nes
- Time zone: UTC+01:00 (CET)
  - Summer (DST): UTC+02:00 (CEST)

Sundbyhagen is a village in Nes, Akershus, Norway.
