= Bjarne Røtterud =

Norwegian painter (1929–2011)

Bjarne Røtterud (29 August 1929 – 12 March 2011) was a Norwegian painter.

He was born in Nannestad. He took his education at the Norwegian National Academy of Craft and Art Industry and the Norwegian National Academy of Fine Arts. He lived in Paris from 1969, but died in Nannestad. He painted in abstract style from the late 1960s. His work is owned by the Norwegian Museum of Contemporary Art.
