= Kampå =

- Village
- Location in Akershus
- Coordinates: 60°13′0″N 11°23′27″E
- Country: Norway
- Region: Østlandet
- County: Akershus
- Municipality: Nes

Area
  - Total: 0.51 km^{2} (0.20 sq mi)

Population (2011)
  - Total: 540
  - Density: 1,100/km^{2} (2,700/sq mi)
- Time zone: UTC+01:00 (CET)
  - Summer (DST): UTC+02:00 (CEST)

Kampå is a village in the municipality of Nes, Akershus, Norway. Its population in 2005 was 544.
