= Funnefoss/Vormsund IL =

Norwegian sports club

- Full name: Funnefoss/Vormsund Idrettslag
- Founded: 6 December 1924; 100 years ago, as Funnefoss; 5 February 1967; 58 years ago, as Funnefoss/Vormsund
- Ground: Funnefoss stadion, Oppåkermoen
- Coach: Roger "Kulpen" Myrbråten
- League: 4. divisjon
- 2024: 3. divisjon, group 5, 12th of 14 (relegated)
Home colours	Away colours

Funnefoss/Vormsund Idrettslag, commonly known as Fu/Vo, is a Norwegian sports club from Nes, Akershus. It has sections for association football and amateur boxing.

The club was founded as a merger between Funnefoss IF and Vormsund IL. Funnefoss IF was founded on 6 December 1924, and Fu/Vo counts this as their founding date. Funnefoss was a member of the Workers' Sport Confederation for a short time. The merger took place on 5 February 1967. It covers the villages Funnefoss, Oppåkermoen and Vormsund in Nes, and the home ground is at Oppåkermoen.

The men's football team currently plays in the 4. divisjon, the fifth tier of football in Norway. Its current stint started in 2020, after several years on lower levels.
