= Hvam, Nes =

Hvam
- Village
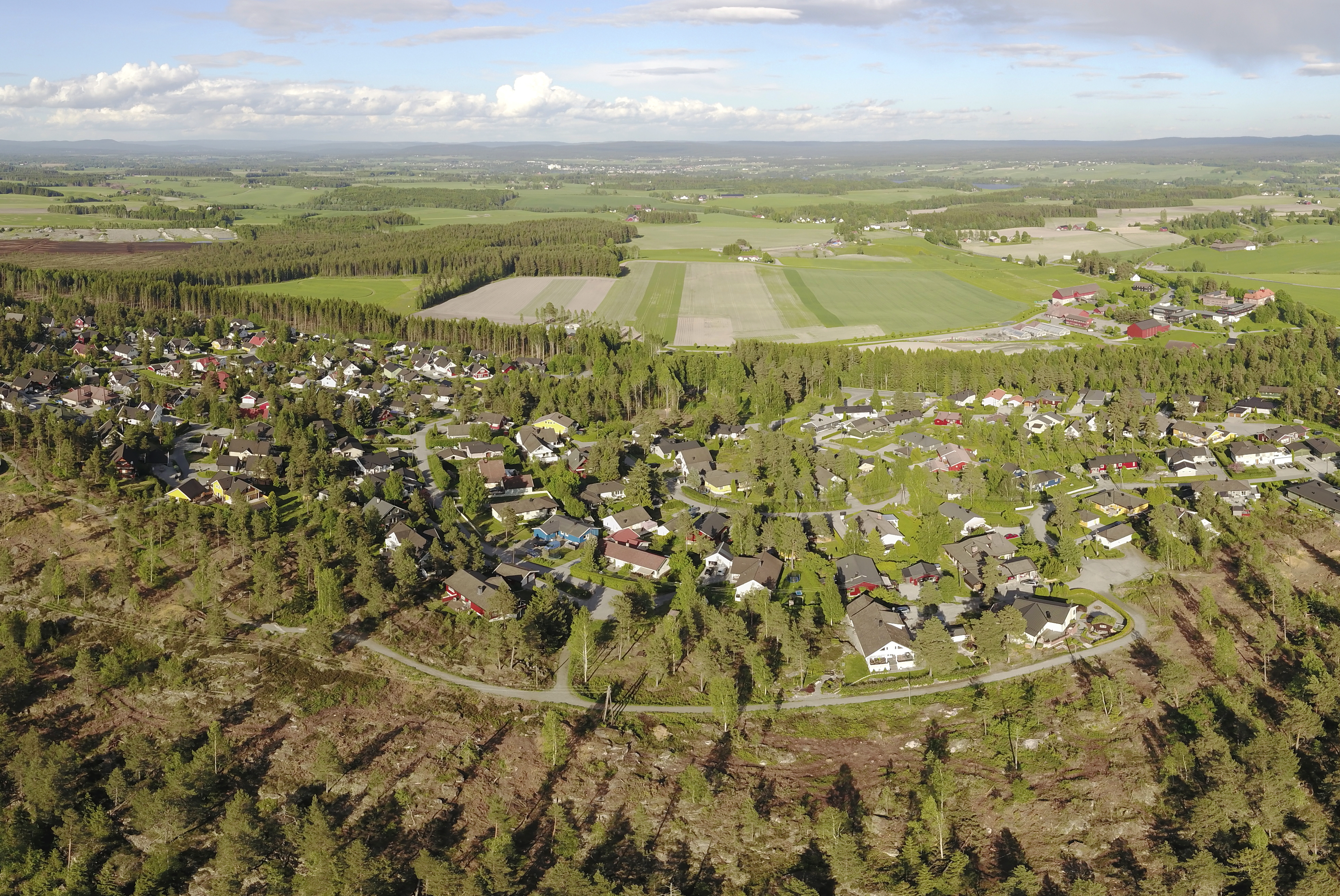

- Location in Akershus
- Coordinates: 60°6′23″N 11°22′3″E
- Country: Norway
- Region: Østlandet
- County: Akershus
- District: Nes
- Time zone: UTC+01:00 (CET)
  - Summer (DST): UTC+02:00 (CEST)

Hvam is a village in Nes municipality, Norway. It is a part of the urban area Tomteråsen, which is located a few miles west of the urban area Årnes. Its population is 660.
