= Neskollen =

- Village
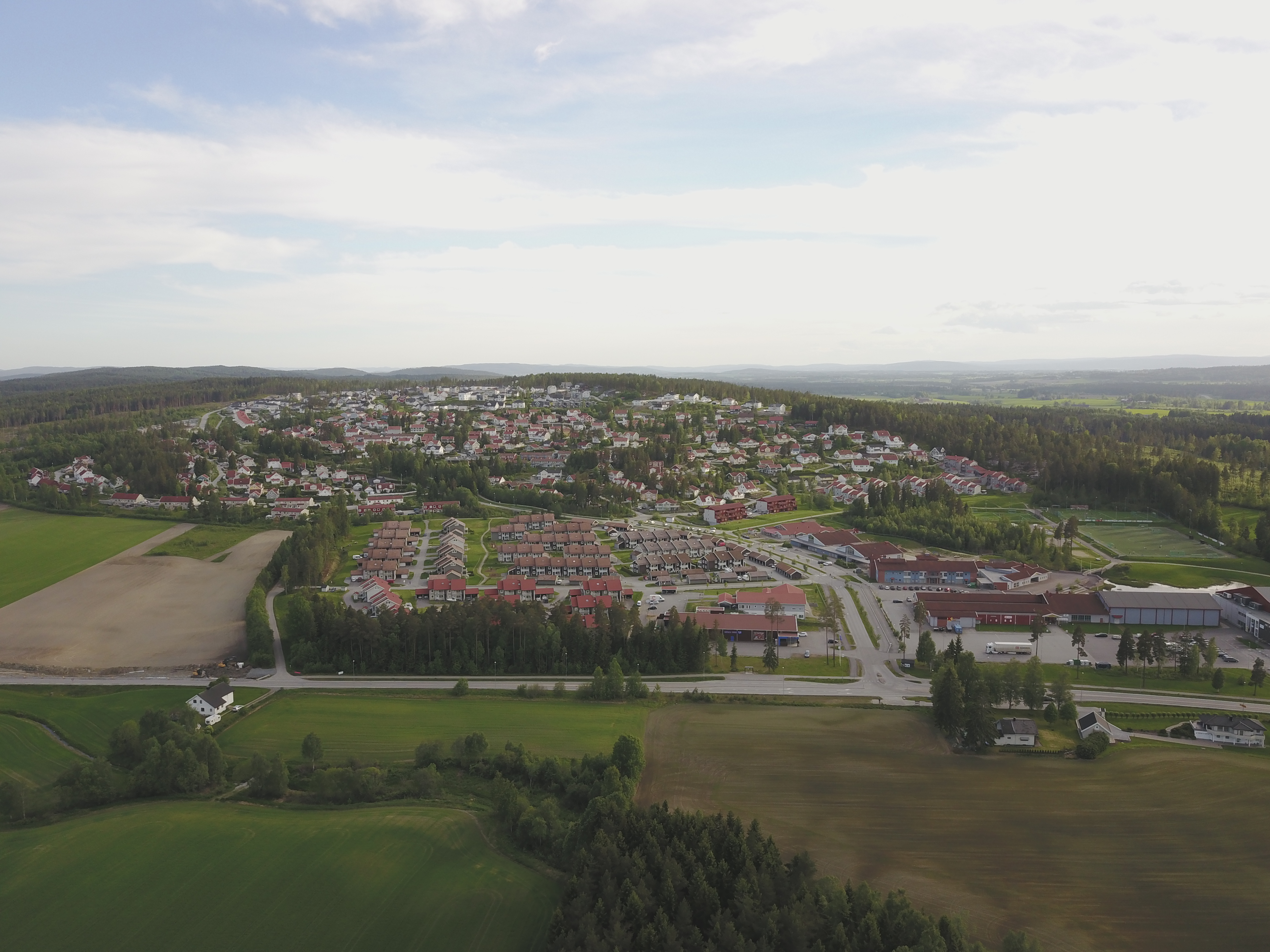

- Location in Akershus
- Coordinates: 60°7′26″N 11°20′23″E
- Country: Norway
- Region: Østlandet
- County: Akershus
- Municipality: Nes

Population (27 October 2025)
  - Total: 3,028
- Time zone: UTC+01:00 (CET)
  - Summer (DST): UTC+02:00 (CEST)

Neskollen is a village in Nes municipality, Norway, located a few kilometres northwest of the urban area Årnes. Its population on 27 October 2025 was 3028.
