= Gard Kristiansen =

Norwegian footballer (born 1972)

Personal information
- Full name: Gard Torbjørn Åsheim Kristiansen
- Date of birth: 3 May 1972 (age 54)
- Place of birth: Nannestad
- Position: Defender

Senior career*
Years	Team	Apps	(Gls)
–1994	Holter		
1995–1996	Lillestrøm	25	(2)
1997	Sarpsborg	25	(1)
1998–2006	Moss	219	(12)
2007–2010	Rapid		
2007	→ Eidsvoll Turn (loan)		
2010	Moss	0	(0)

Managerial career
- 2007–2010: Rapid (player-coach)
- * Club domestic league appearances and goals

Gard Kristiansen (born 3 May 1972) is a retired Norwegian football defender.

He grew up in the club Holter IF and was bought by the regional greats Lillestrøm SK in 1995 to play first-tier football. Not quite breaking into the first team, in 1997 he took one season on the second tier with Sarpsborg FK, before playing nine seasons in Moss FK, on the first and second tier interchangeably. He played league games.

Ahead of the 2007 season he joined then-seventh-tier club SK Rapid as playing coach. In the latter half of 2007 he was loaned out to Eidsvoll TF. He then continued in Rapid until the latter half of the 2010 season, when he was recruited by Moss again to provide routine in training sessions for an injury-stricken team. Outside of football he worked as a schoolteacher.

He should not be confused with Gard Hellgren Kristiansen, who also played in the city of Moss, for local rivals Sprint-Jeløy.
