= Teigebyen =

- Village
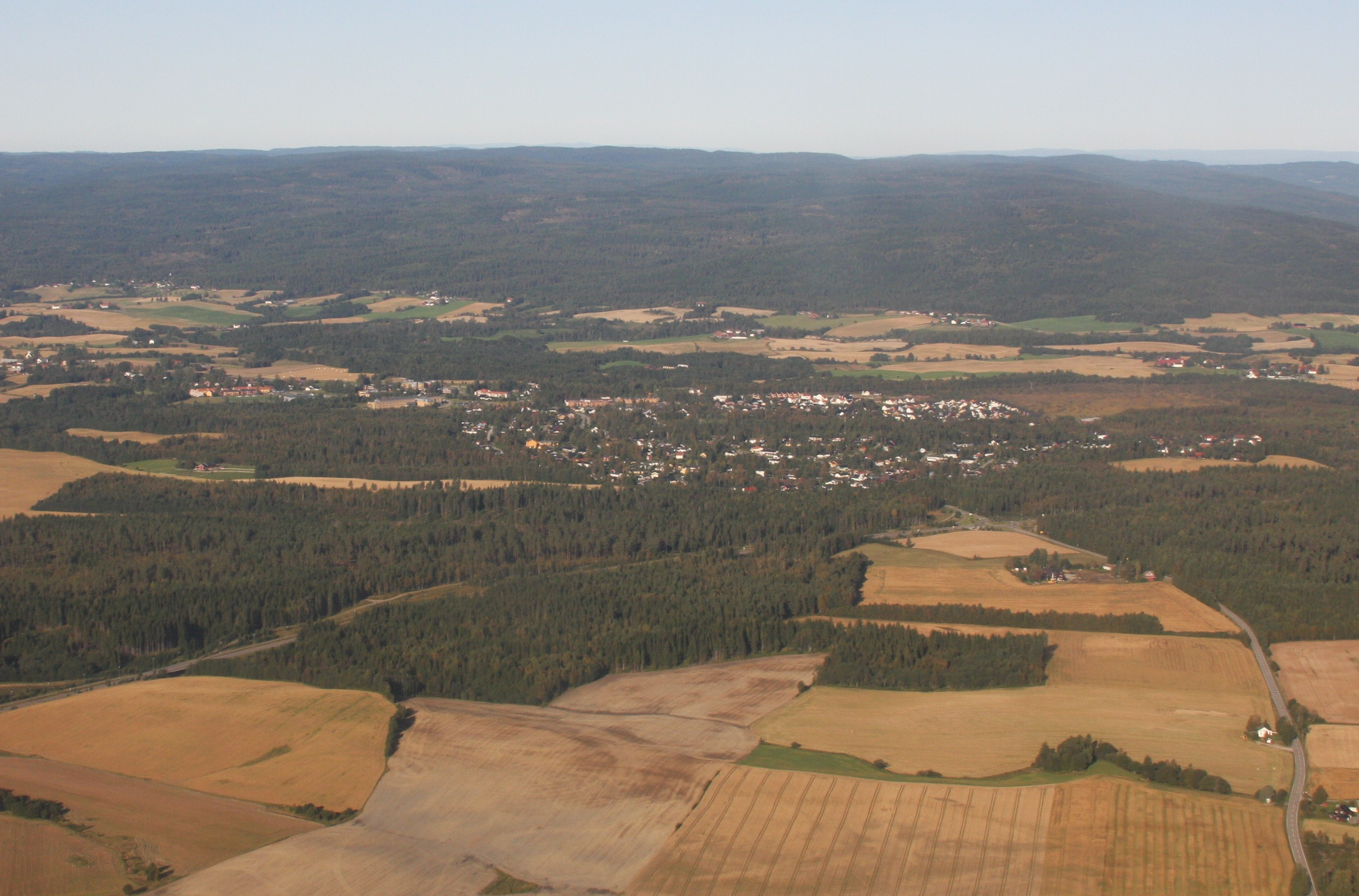
- Aerial view of Teigebyen

- Location in Akershus
- Coordinates: 60.2228°N 11.0242°E
- Country: Norway
- Region: Østlandet
- County: Akershus
- Municipality: Nannestad
- Time zone: UTC+01:00 (CET)
  - Summer (DST): UTC+02:00 (CEST)
- Post Code: 2030

Teigebyen is the administrative centre in Nannestad municipality, Norway. It is located southwest of Råholt, and northwest of Gardermoen. As of 2021, its population was 3,144.
