= Brårud =

- Village
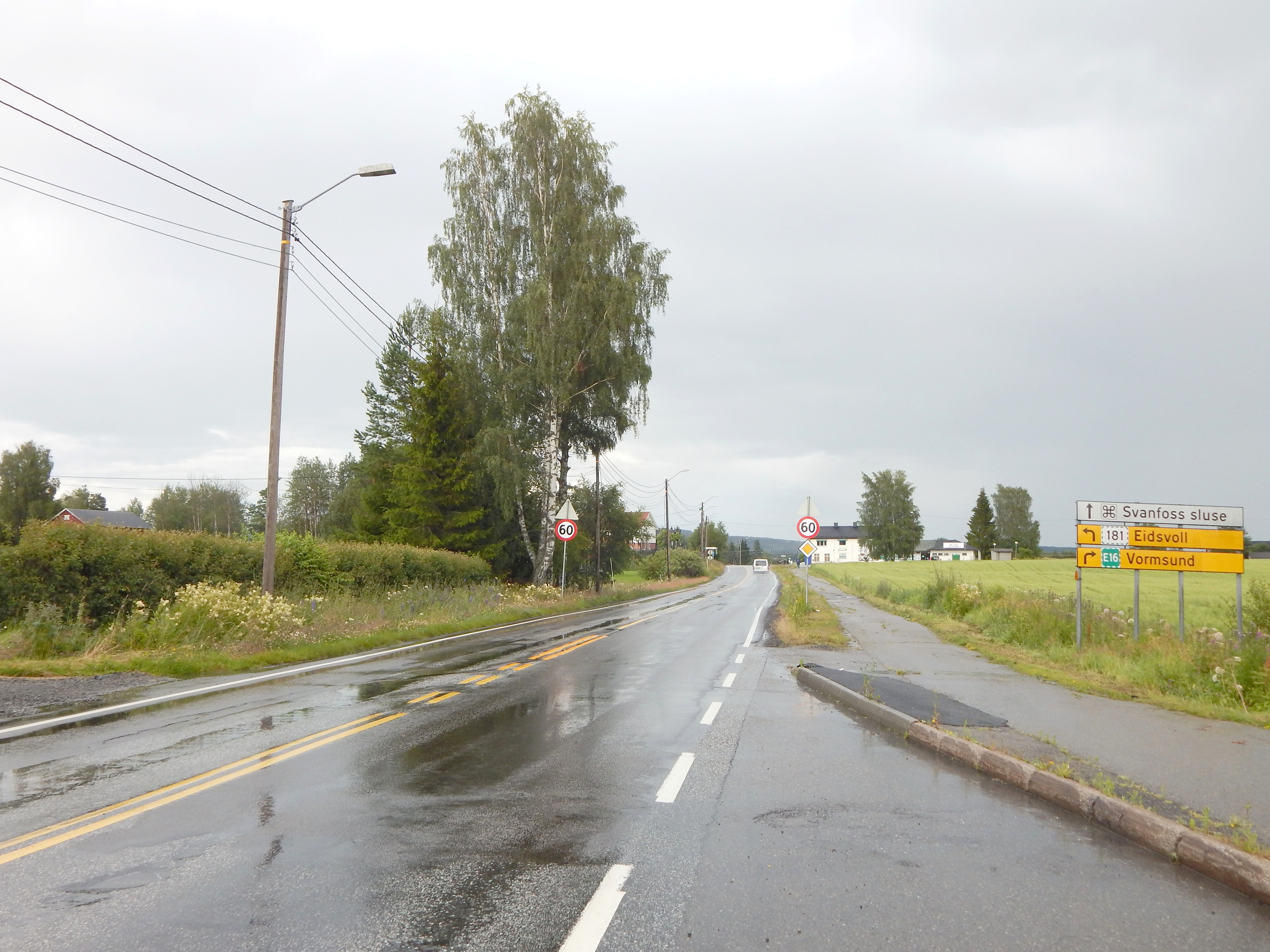

- Location in Akershus
- Coordinates: 60°12′37″N 11°19′57″E
- Country: Norway
- Region: Østlandet
- County: Akershus
- Municipality: Nes

Population (2005)
  - Total: 452
- Time zone: UTC+01:00 (CET)
  - Summer (DST): UTC+02:00 (CEST)

Brårud is a village in the municipality of Nes, Akershus, Norway. Its population (2005) is 452.
