= Fenstad =

Coordinates: 60°13′N 11°23′E

- Village
- Location in Akershus
- Country: Norway
- Region: Østlandet
- County: Akershus
- Time zone: UTC+01:00 (CET)
  - Summer (DST): UTC+02:00 (CEST)

Fenstad is a village in the municipality of Nes, Akershus, Norway. Fenstad lies in the northern part of Nes municipality, east of the Vorma river.
