= Aulifeltet =

- Village
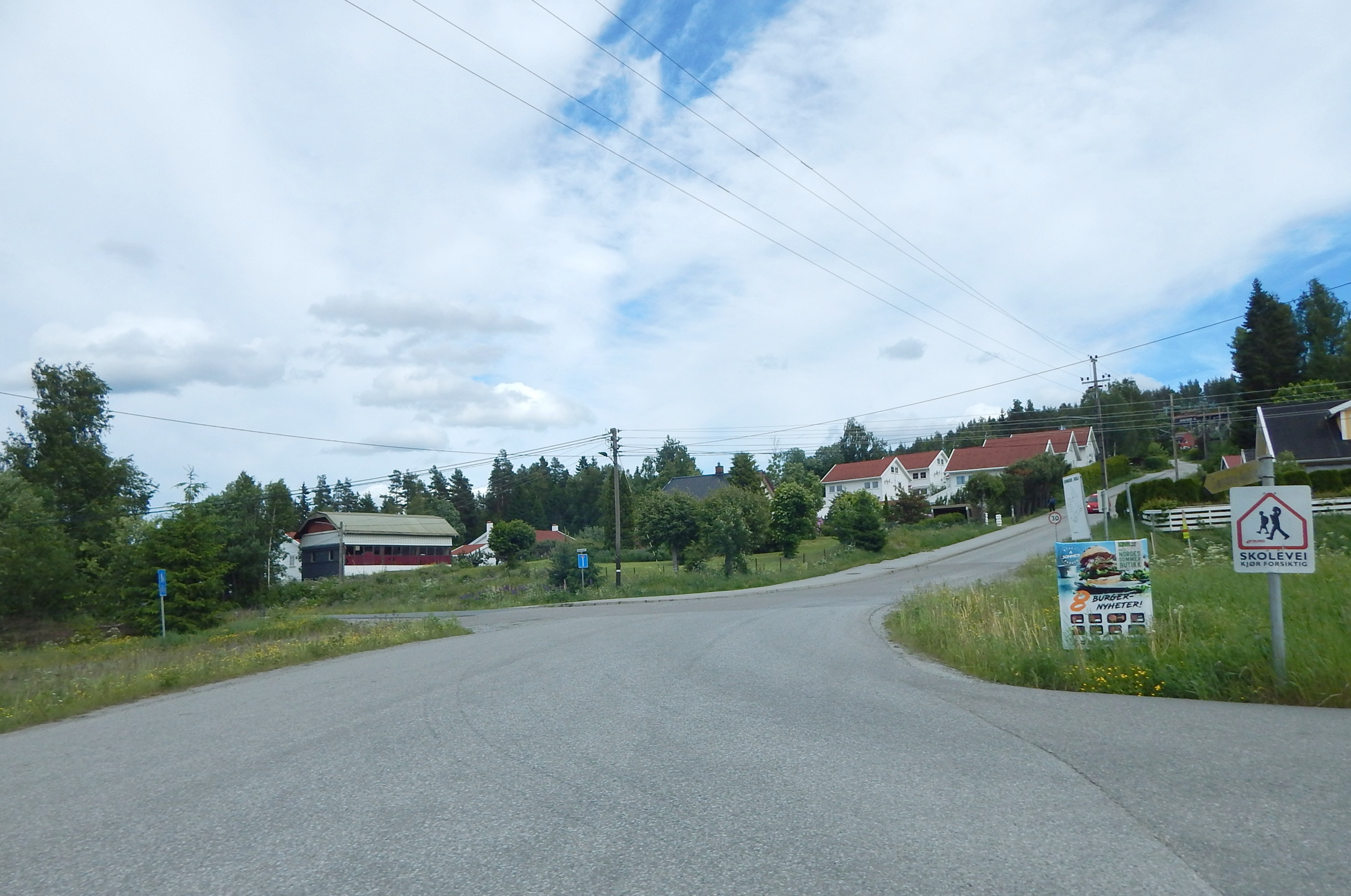

- Location in Akershus
- Coordinates: 60°1′47″N 11°21′27″E
- Country: Norway
- Region: Østlandet
- County: Akershus
- Municipality: Nes
- Time zone: UTC+01:00 (CET)
  - Summer (DST): UTC+02:00 (CEST)

Aulifeltet is a village in the municipality of Nes, Akershus, Norway. Its population is 2,683, of which 512 people live within the border of the neighboring municipality Sørum.
