= Løkenfeltet =

- Village
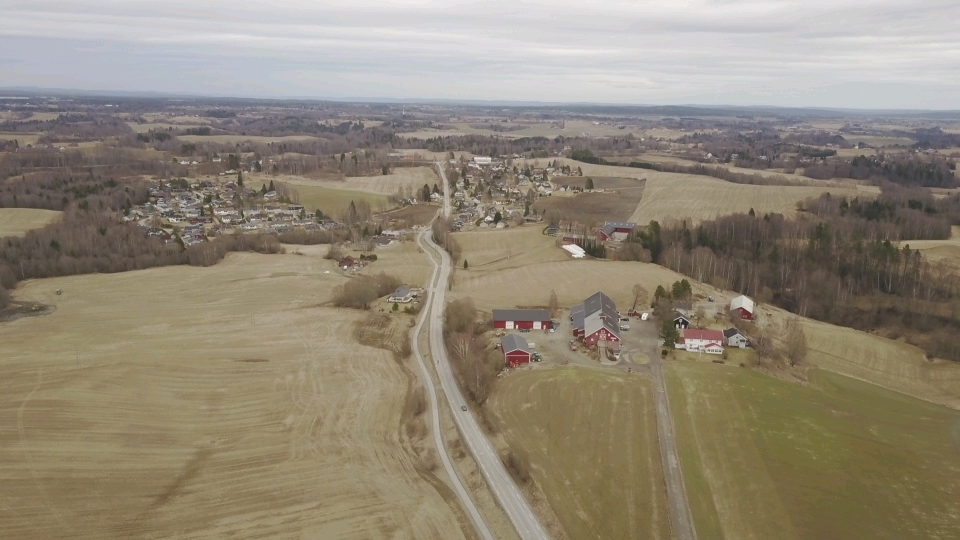

- Location in Akershus
- Coordinates: 60°08′22.66″N 11°02′36.19″E
- Country: Norway
- Region: Østlandet
- County: Akershus
- Municipality: Nannestad
- Time zone: UTC+01:00 (CET)
  - Summer (DST): UTC+02:00 (CEST)

Løkenfeltet is a village in Nannestad municipality, Norway. It is located in Holter in southern Nannestad west of Jessheim and Sand. Its population (2005) is 599.
