= Haga, Nes =

- Village
- Location in Akershus
- Coordinates: 60°3′10″N 11°22′22″E
- Country: Norway
- Region: Østlandet
- County: Akershus
- Municipality: Nes
- Time zone: UTC+01:00 (CET)
  - Summer (DST): UTC+02:00 (CEST)

Haga is a village in the municipality of Nes, Akershus, Norway. Its population is 571.
