= Sjøstrand, Nesodden =

Sjøstrand
- Village
- Location in Akershus
- Coordinates: 59°51′11″N 10°39′07″E
- Country: Norway
- Region: Østlandet
- County: Akershus
- Municipality: Nesodden
- Time zone: UTC+01:00 (CET)
  - Summer (DST): UTC+02:00 (CEST)

Sjøstrand is a village in Nesodden, Akershus county, Norway.
