= Fjerdingby =

Coordinates: 59.9232242°N 11.0587941°E

- Municipal
- Interactive map of Fjerdingby
- Country: Norway
- Region: Østlandet
- County: Akershus
- Municipality: Rælingen
- Time zone: UTC+01:00 (CET)
  - Summer (DST): UTC+02:00 (CEST)
- Post code: 2008

Fjerdingby is the municipal centre in Rælingen municipality Akershus, Norway.
