= Ingeborgrud =

- Village
- Location in Akershus
- Coordinates: 60°14′N 11°31′E
- Country: Norway
- Region: Østlandet
- County: Akershus
- Municipality: Nes
- Time zone: UTC+01:00 (CET)
  - Summer (DST): UTC+02:00 (CEST)

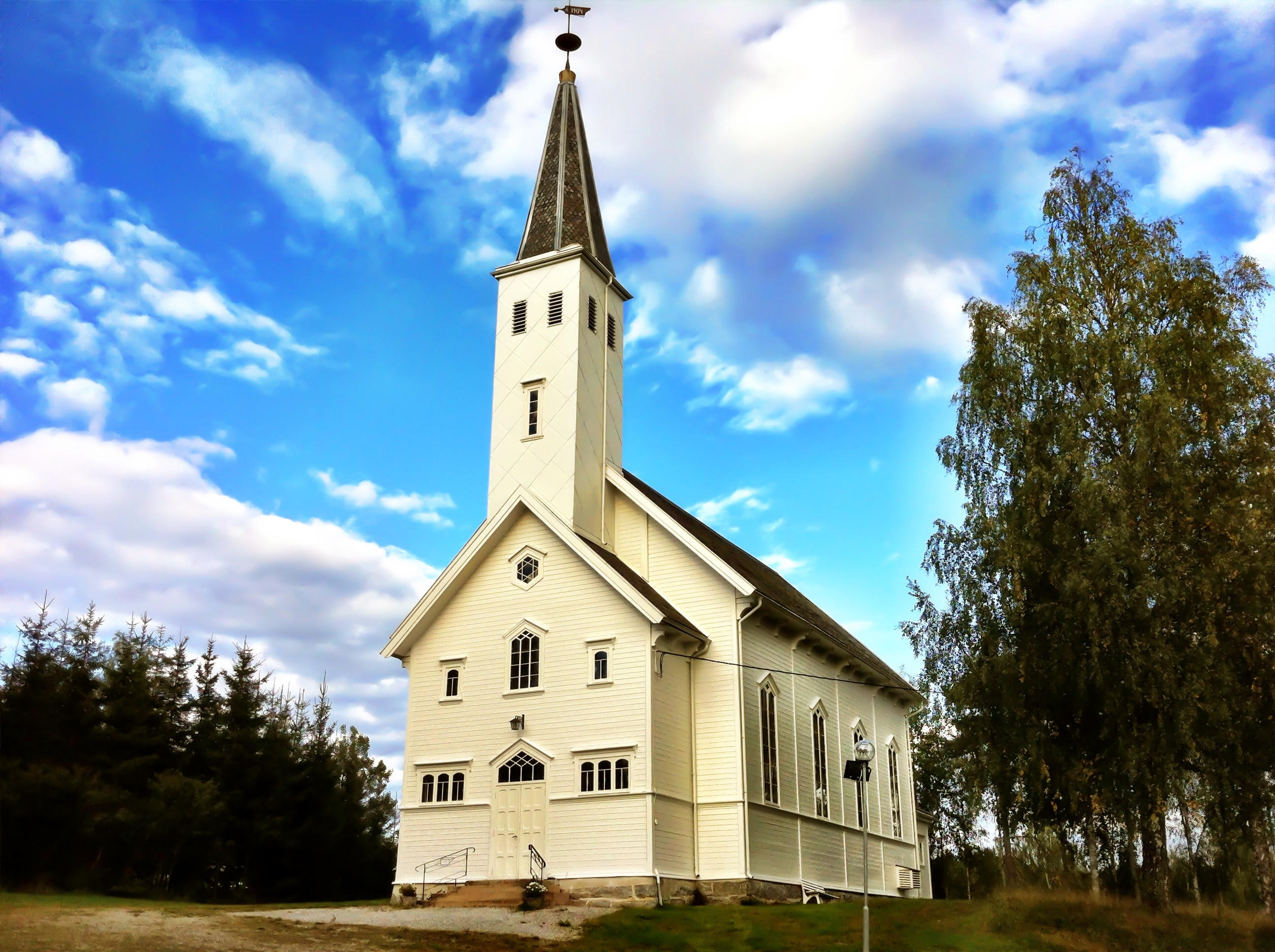

Ingeborgrud is a village in Nes municipality, Norway. It is a part of the urban area Skogrand, which is located north of Oppakermoen and west of Skarnes. Its population is 333.
