= Fjellfoten =

- Village
- Location in Akershus
- Coordinates: 60°5′23″N 11°28′20″E
- Country: Norway
- Region: Østlandet
- County: Akershus
- Municipality: Nes
- Time zone: UTC+01:00 (CET)
  - Summer (DST): UTC+02:00 (CEST)

Fjellfoten is a village in the municipality of Nes, Akershus, Norway. Its population (2005) is 1,006.
