= Rælingen =

Rælingen Municipality Rælingen kommune
- Municipality
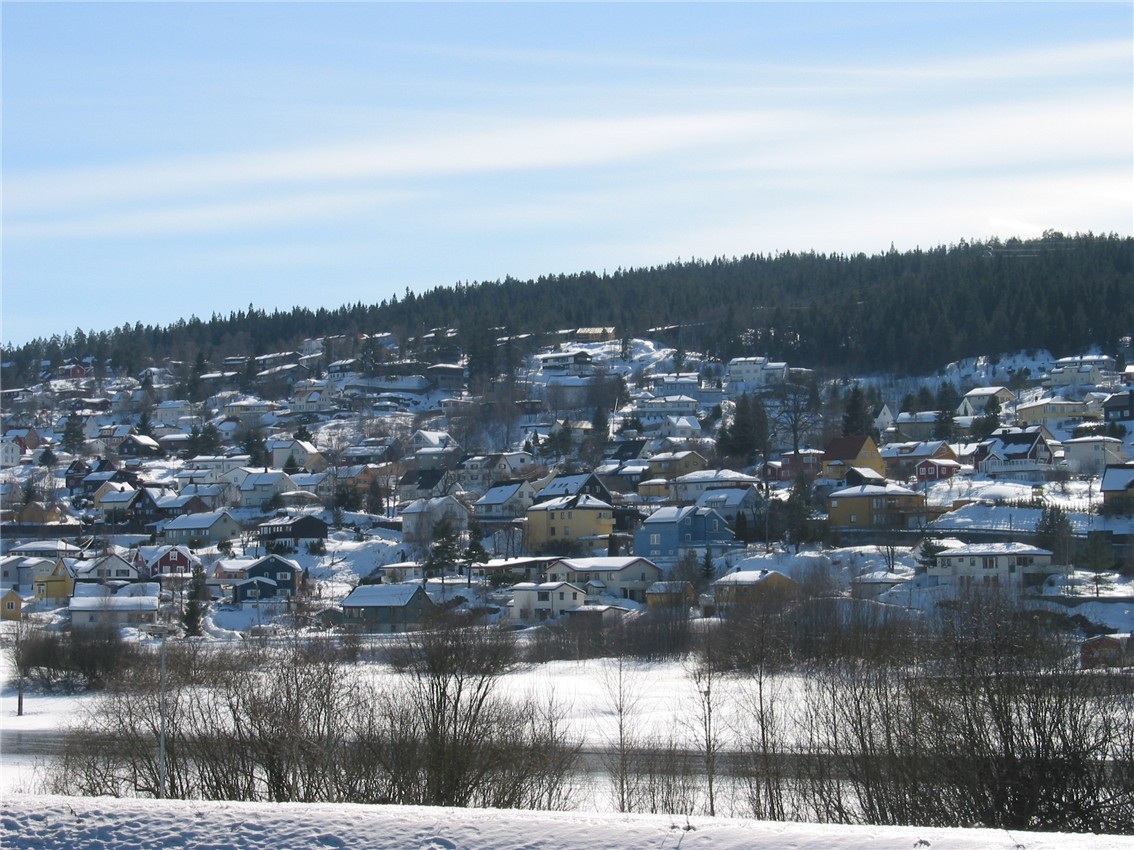
- Rælingen seen from Lillestrøm

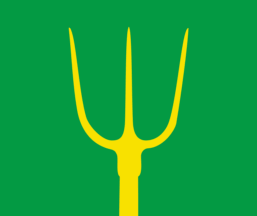
- Flag Coat of arms

- Akershus within Norway

- Rælingen within Akershus
- Coordinates: 59°53′21″N 11°4′31″E
- Country: Norway
- County: Akershus
- District: Romerike
- Administrative centre: Fjerdingby

Government
  - Mayor (2023): Gro Langdalen (H)

Area
  - Total: 72 km^{2} (28 sq mi)
  - Land: 56 km^{2} (22 sq mi)
  - Rank: #336 in Norway

Population (2026)
  - Total: 20 921
  - Rank: #65 in Norway
  - Density: 37,038/km^{2} (95,930/sq mi)
  - Change (10 years): ▲ +21.6%
- Demonym: Ræling

Official language
  - Norwegian form: Neutral
- Time zone: UTC+01:00 (CET)
  - Summer (DST): UTC+02:00 (CEST)
- ISO 3166 code: NO-3224
- Website: Official website

Rælingen is a municipality in Akershus county, Norway. It is part of the traditional region of Romerike. The administrative centre of the municipality is the village of Fjerdingby. Rælingen was separated from the municipality of Fet on 1 July 1929.

== General information ==
=== Name ===
The name is first mentioned around 1400 ("i Ræling"). It is probably an old district name (the name of the church site is Fjerdingby). The meaning of the name is unknown.

=== Coat-of-arms ===
The coat-of-arms is from modern times. They were granted on 30 April 1981. The arms show a yellow pitchfork on a green background. It is a symbol for the local agriculture. A large part of the municipality is lowland, which historically has mainly been used to produce hay. The pitchfork has three prongs representing the three rivers that run through the municipality: Nitelva, Leira, and Glomma.

Number of minorities (1st and 2nd generation) in Rælingen by country of origin in 2015
Ancestry	Number
Poland	469
Pakistan	347
Vietnam	343
Iran	323
Sweden	172
Iraq	163
Eritrea	139
Lithuania	138
India	108
Afghanistan	107

== Geography ==
Located between Lillestrøm and Lørenskog, Rælingen encompasses the northwestern part of Øyeren. The northern part of the municipality is contiguous with the urban area of Lillestrøm and forms part of the Oslo urban area.

Major residential areas include Fjerdingby, Rud, Løvenstad, Smestad and Nordby. Despite its relatively small geographic area, Rælingen has a predominantly concentrated settlement pattern, with most of its population living in the northern part of the municipality. The southern parts are largely covered by forests and Øyeren.

== Notable people ==
- Stine Buer, (Norwegian Wiki) (born 1971 in Rælingen) Norwegian TV-personality, actress and comedian
- Guro Sibeko (born 1975) a Norwegian novelist, non-fiction writer and activist; brought up in Rælingen
- Ida Fladen, (Norwegian Wiki) (born 1986 in Rælingen) Norwegian radio and TV personality
- Anders Gaasland (born 1992 in Rælingen) politician, gay rights activist
- Kristoffer Ajer (born 1998 in Rælingen) footballer who currently plays for Brentford
- Christian Sørum (born 1995), Norwegian beach volleyball player
- Henrik Kristoffersen (born 1994), Norwegian World Cup alpine ski racer, World Champion, and Olympic medalist
- Arne Hurlen (born 1970 in Rælingen), Norwegian musician and singer in the Norwegian band Postgirobygget

== Sister cities ==
The following cities are twinned with Rælingen:

- - Kirkkonummi, Etelä-Suomi, Finland
- - Munkedal, Västra Götaland County, Sweden
