= Nerdrum, Lillestrøm =

Nerdrum
- Village
- Location in Akershus Nerdrum (Norway)
- Coordinates: 59°55′N 11°08′E
- Country: Norway
- Region: Østlandet
- County: Akershus
- Municipality: Lillestrøm
- Time zone: UTC+01:00 (CET)
  - Summer (DST): UTC+02:00 (CEST)

Nerdrum is a village in Lillestrøm, Akershus, Norway.
