= Smestad, Akershus =

- Urban Settlement
- Location in Akershus Smestad, Akershus (Norway)
- Coordinates: 59°54′0″N 11°6′0″E
- Country: Norway
- Region: Østlandet
- County: Akershus
- Municipality: Rælingen

Area
  - Total: 0.91 km^{2} (0.35 sq mi)

Population (2025)
  - Total: 3 369
- Time zone: UTC+01:00 (CET)
  - Summer (DST): UTC+02:00 (CEST)

Smestad is an urban settlement in Rælingen municipality, Akershus, Norway. It had a population of 3 369 as of 2026.
