= Hvam, Skedsmo =

Hvam
- Village
- Location in Akershus
- Coordinates: 59°58′27″N 10°59′52″E
- Country: Norway
- Region: Østlandet
- County: Akershus
- Municipality: Lillestrøm
- Time zone: UTC+01:00 (CET)
  - Summer (DST): UTC+02:00 (CEST)

Hvam is a village in Lillestrøm, Akershus, Norway.
