= Vevelstad, Akershus =

Vevelstad
- Village
- Location in Akershus
- Coordinates: 59°45′28″N 10°50′50″E
- Country: Norway
- Region: Østlandet
- County: Akershus
- Municipality: Nordre Follo
- Time zone: UTC+01:00 (CET)
  - Summer (DST): UTC+02:00 (CEST)

Vevelstad is a village in Nordre Follo, Akershus, Norway.
