= Årnes =

- Village
- Location within Akershus Årnes (Akershus)
- Coordinates: 60°7′20″N 11°27′55″E
- Country: Norway
- County: Akershus
- District: Romerike
- Municipality: Nes

Area
  - Total: 3.23 km^{2} (1.25 sq mi)

Population (2023)
  - Total: 5,107
  - Density: 1,737/km^{2} (4,500/sq mi)
- Time zone: UTC+1 (CET)
  - Summer (DST): UTC+2 (CEST)
- Postal code: 2150

Årnes is a village in Nes municipality in Akershus County, Norway. The village is located along the eastern riverbank of the Glomma River, roughly 3 kilometers downriver from its confluence with the Vorma River.

== History ==
Before 1862, the area consisted of farmland and a few buildings. One fifth of the surrounding farmland and fields were expropriated for the establishment of Årnes Station and the Kongsvinger Railway Line, which opened on October 3, 1862. The establishment of the railroad and station led to Årnes changing from a purely agricultural community to incorporating elements of commerce, such as a coaching inn, trading company and boating channel.

Norway's longest river the Glomma receives the Vorma, a major tributary, just north of Årnes.
