= Nannestad =

Nannestad Municipality Nannestad kommune
- Municipality
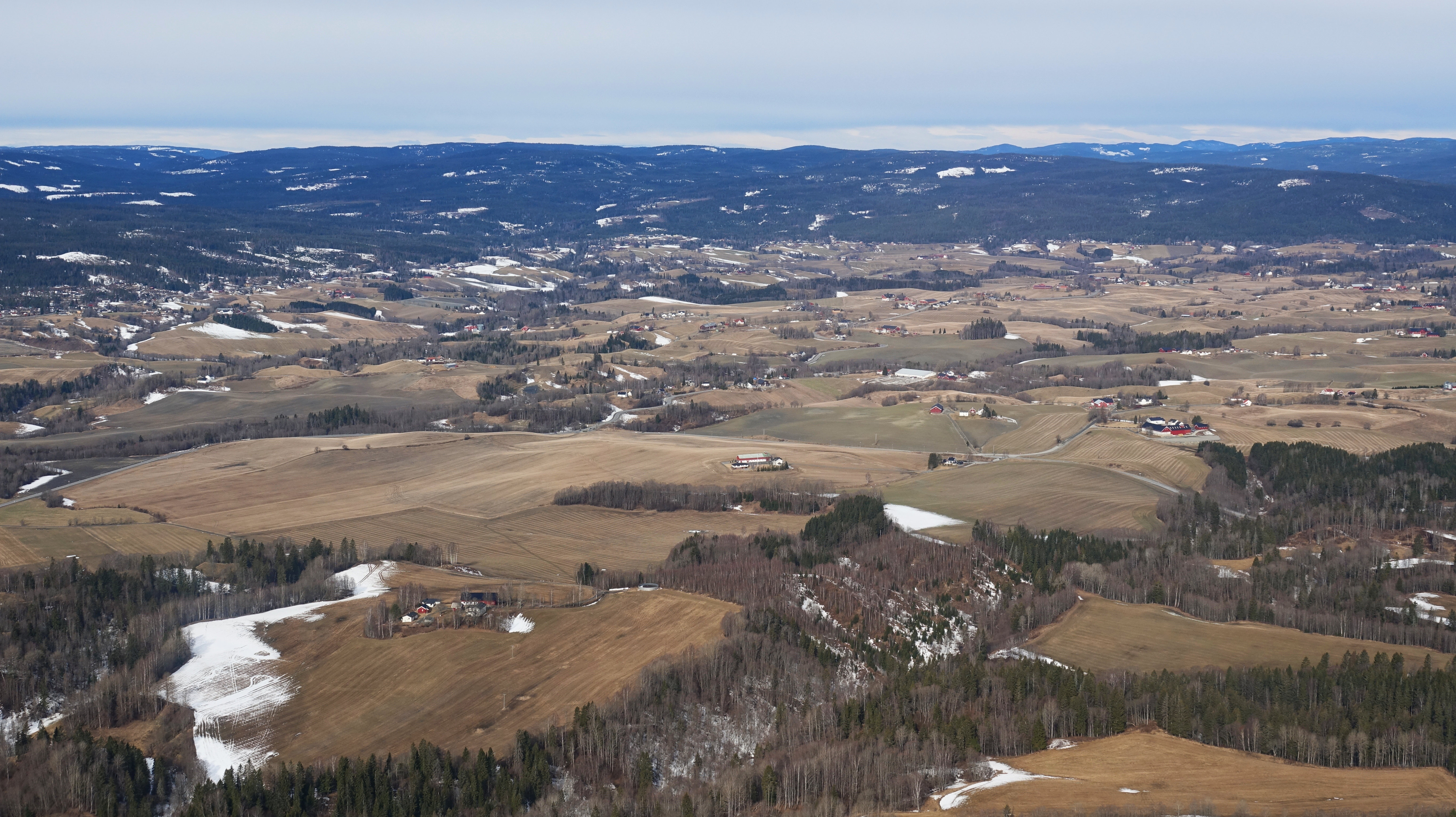
- The characteristic landscape of Nannestad

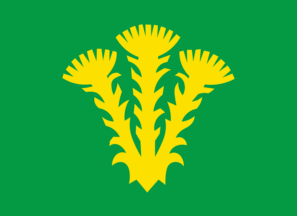
- Flag Coat of arms

- Akershus within Norway

- Nannestad within Akershus
- Coordinates: 60°14′44″N 10°57′10″E
- Country: Norway
- County: Akershus
- District: Romerike
- Administrative centre: Teigebyen

Government
  - Mayor (2007-): Anne-Ragni K. Amundsen (Ap)

Area
  - Total: 341 km^{2} (132 sq mi)
  - Land: 324 km^{2} (125 sq mi)
  - Rank: #259 in Norway

Population (2012)
  - Total: 11,362
  - Rank: #102 in Norway
  - Density: 31/km^{2} (80/sq mi)
  - Change (10 years): ▲ +23%
- Demonym: Nannestadsokning

Official language
  - Norwegian form: Bokmål
- Time zone: UTC+01:00 (CET)
  - Summer (DST): UTC+02:00 (CEST)
- ISO 3166 code: NO-3238
- Website: Official website

Nannestad is a municipality in Akershus county, Norway. It is part of the traditional region of Romerike. The administrative centre of the municipality is the village of Teigebyen.

== History ==
Nannestad was established as a municipality on 1 January 1838 (see formannskapsdistrikt).

Store norske leksikon writes that "At søndre Låke gård (a farm), South of Nannestad Church, Skule Bårdsson beat Birkebeinar (a political group), [... on a battlefield] South of the farm".

== Name and coat-of-arms ==
The municipality (originally the parish) is named after the old Nannestad farm (Old Norse: Nannastaðir), since the first church was built here. The first element is the genitive case of Nanni (an old Norse male name) and the last element is staðir which means "homestead" or "farm".

The coat-of-arms is from modern times. They were granted in 1990. The arms show three yellow coltsfoot flowers on a green background. This is a flower that is prevalent in the area.

== Geography ==
Nannestad is located in northwestern Akershus county, with inhabitants concentrated at Romerikssletta. It includes the villages of Maura, Åsgreina, Eltonåsen, Steinsgård and Teigebyen, that last being the administrative centre.

== Demographics ==
In 2017, 539 inhabitants had Polish parents and/or were Polish (themselves); 239 had Lithuanian parents and/or were Lithuanian.

Ancestry	Number
Poland	539
Lithuania	239
Pakistan	179
Sweden	156
Philippines	143
Thailand	117
Germany	61
Romania	56
Iran	56
Syria	53

== Notable people ==
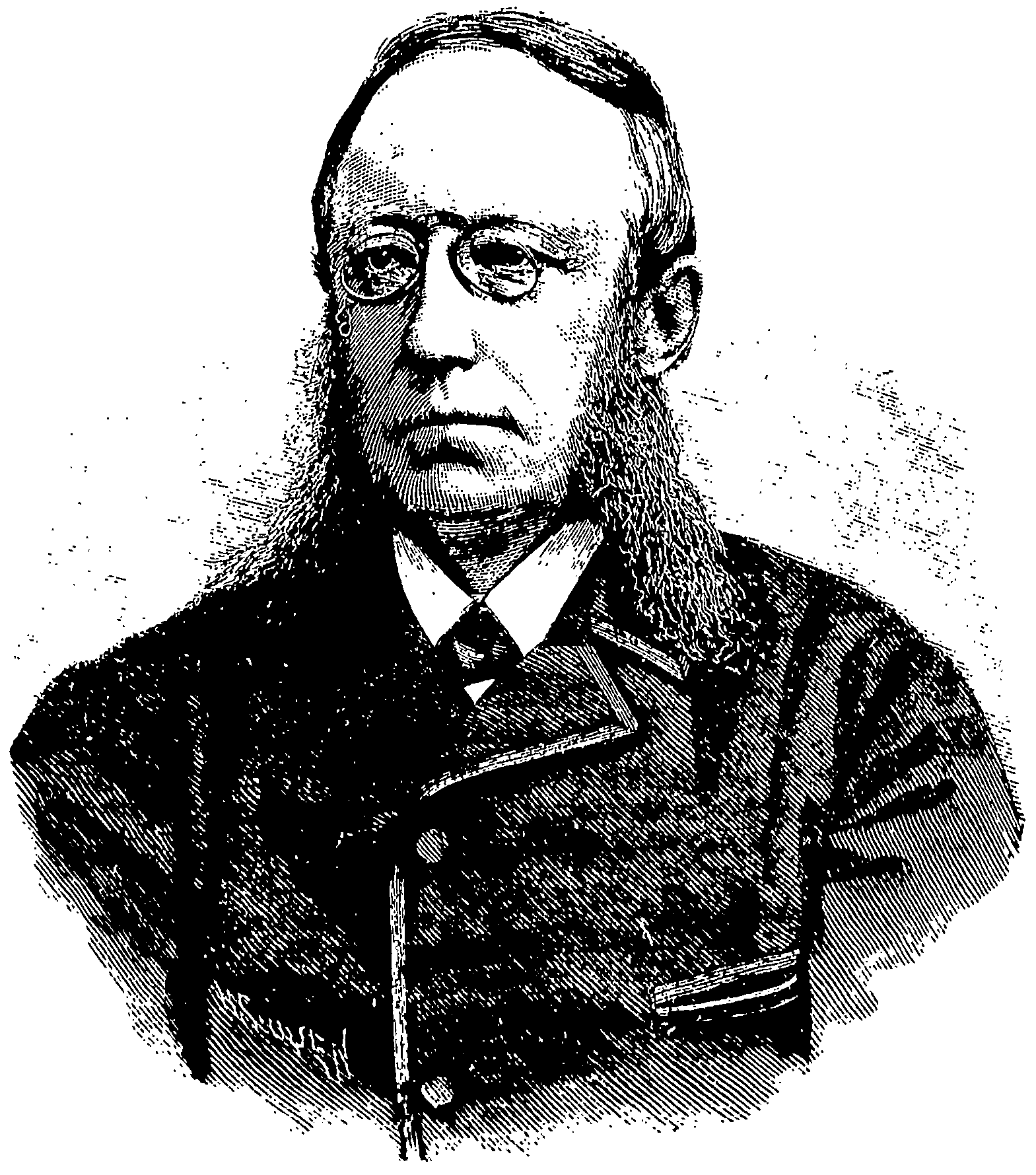
Jacob Stang, 1884

- Hans Georg Jacob Stang (1830 in Nannestad – 1907) a Norwegian attorney and Norway's Prime Minister in Stockholm from 1888–1889
- Oluf Wesmann-Kjær (1874 in Nannestad – 1945) a shooter, competed at the 1920 & 1924 Summer Olympics
- Olaf Helset (1892 in Nannestad – 1960) an Army Major General and sports administrator
- Håkon Christie (1922 in Nannestad – 2010) an architectural historian, antiquarian and author
- Bjarne Røtterud (1929 in Nannestad – 2011) a Norwegian abstract painter
- Gard Kristiansen (born 1972 in Nannestad) a retired football defender with 269 club caps
- Katrine Moholt (born 1973 in Nannestad) a Norwegian TV personality and singer
- Sven Atle Kopperud (born 1977 in Nannestad) stage name Silenoz, guitarist, founded the symphonic black metal band Dimmu Borgir in 1993
- Posthum (founded 2004) a black metal band founded by Jon Kristian Skare and Morten Edseth

== Gallery ==
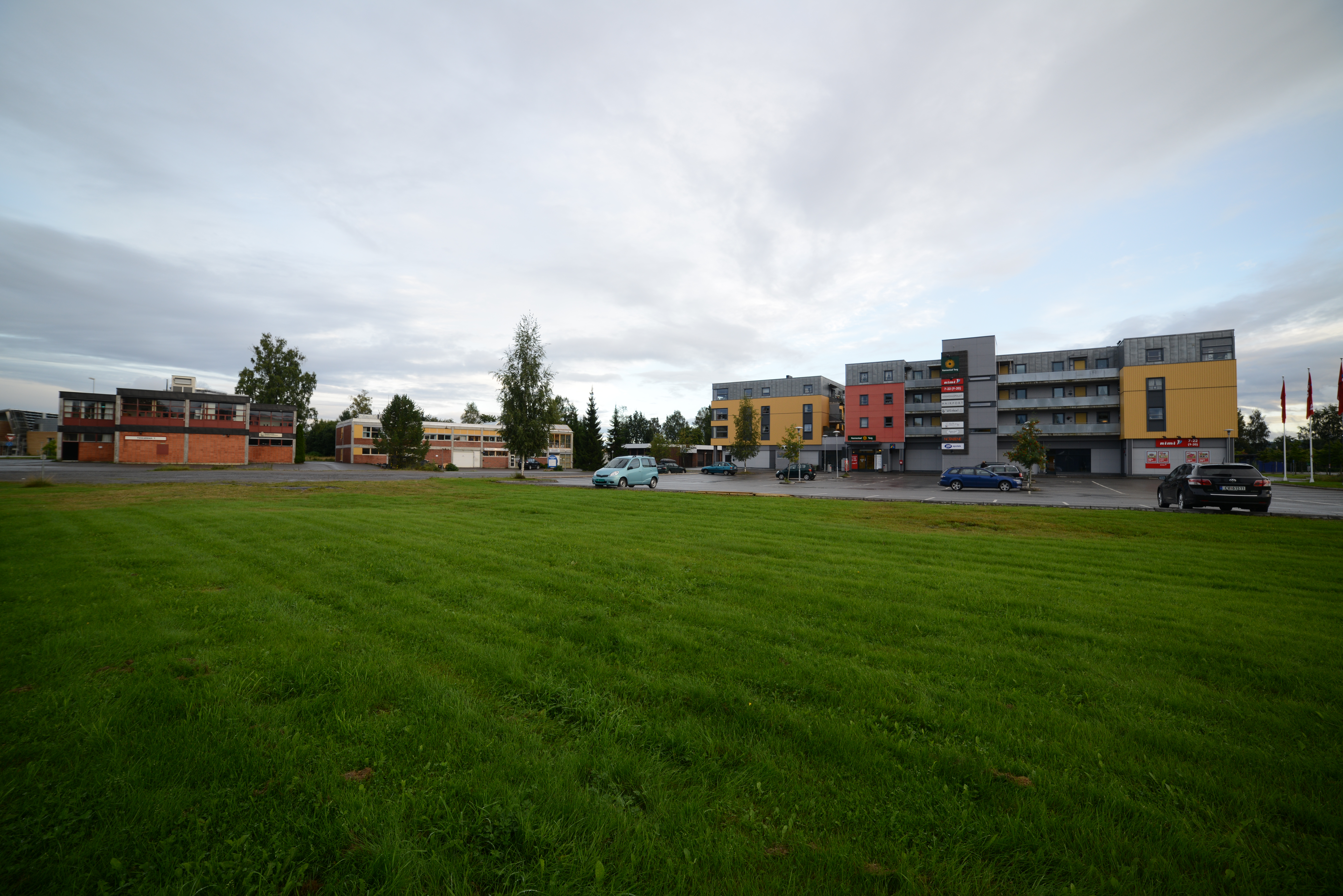
Nannestad plaza

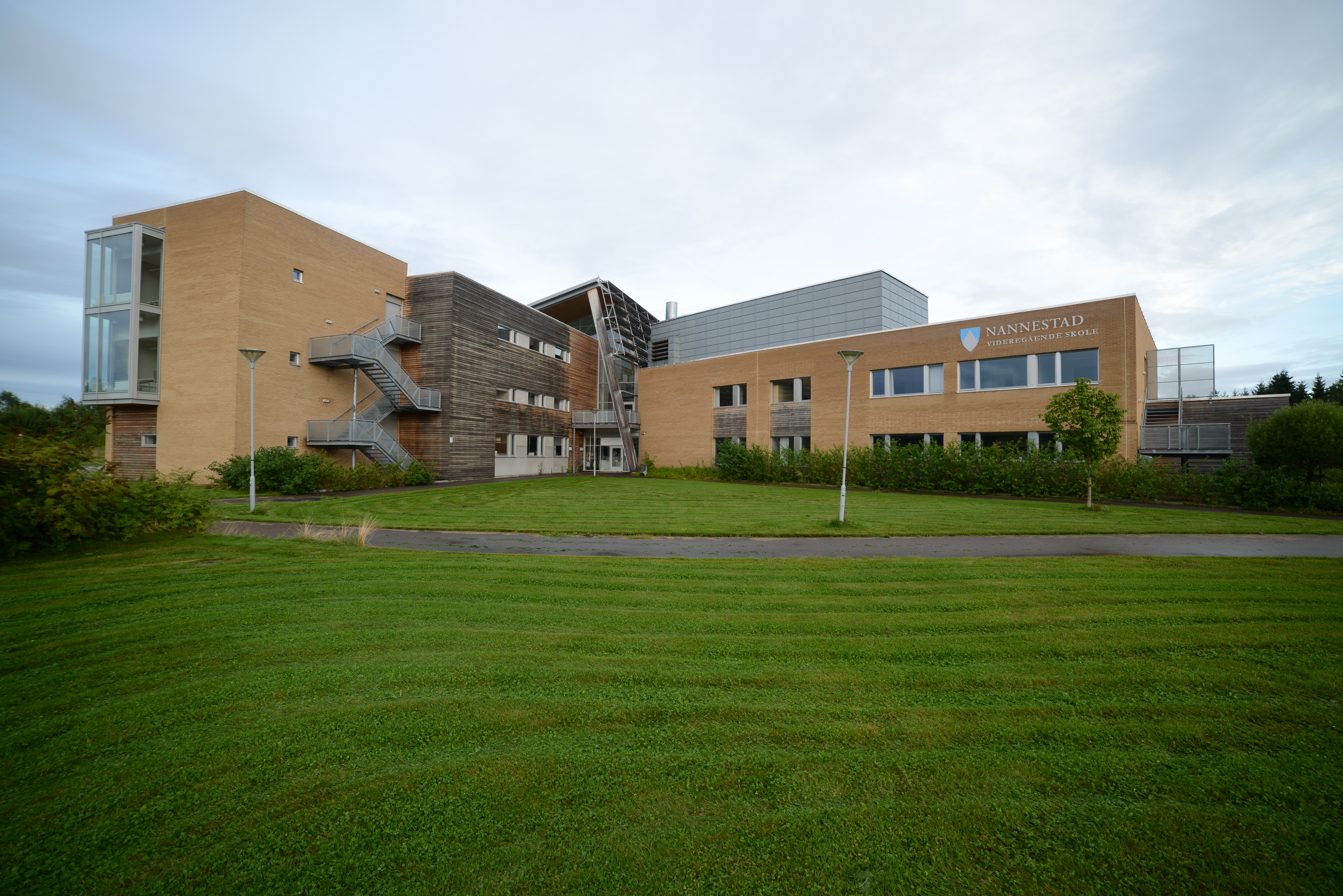
Nannestad upper secondary school

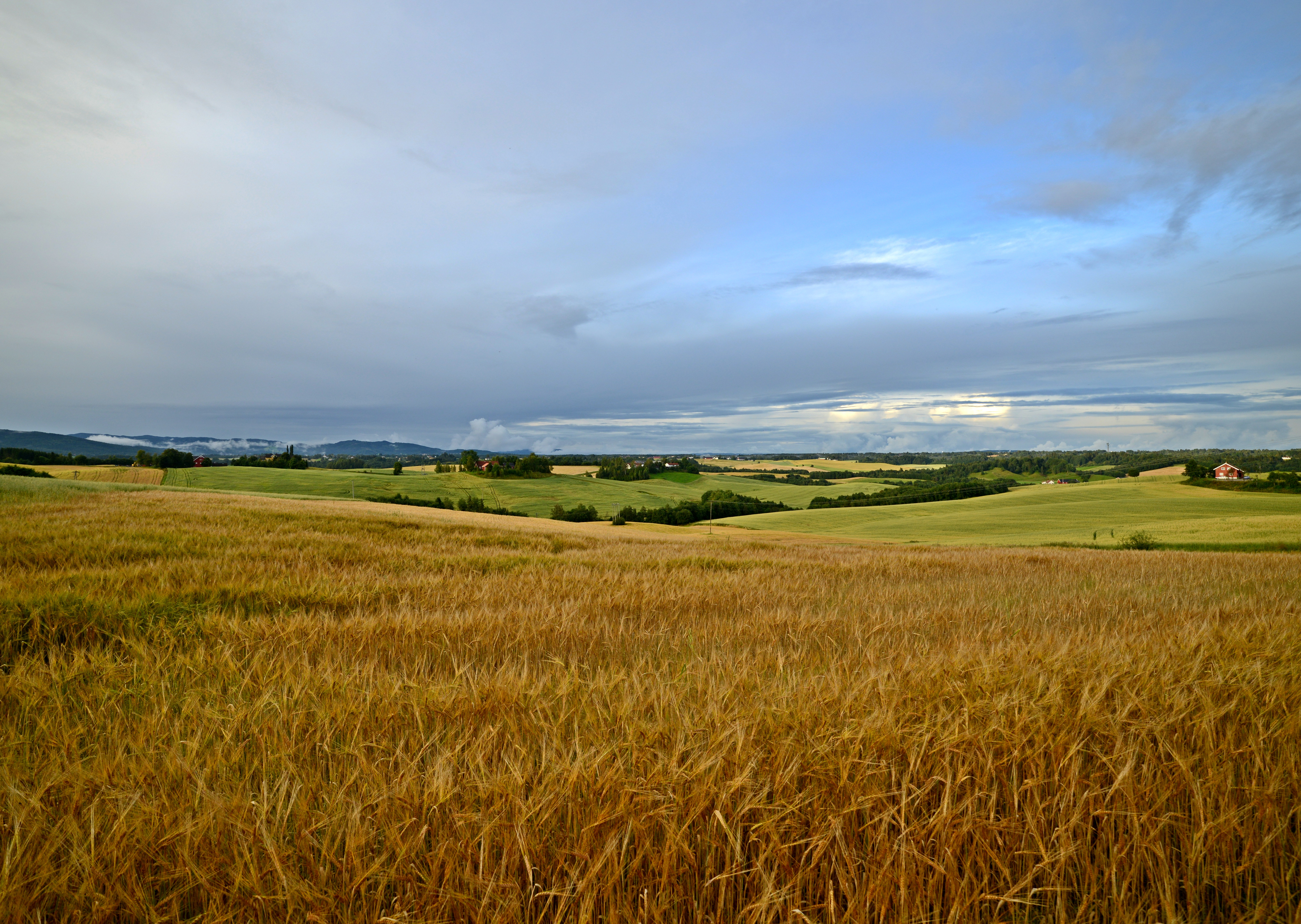
Field of Nannestad
