= Vormsund =

- Village
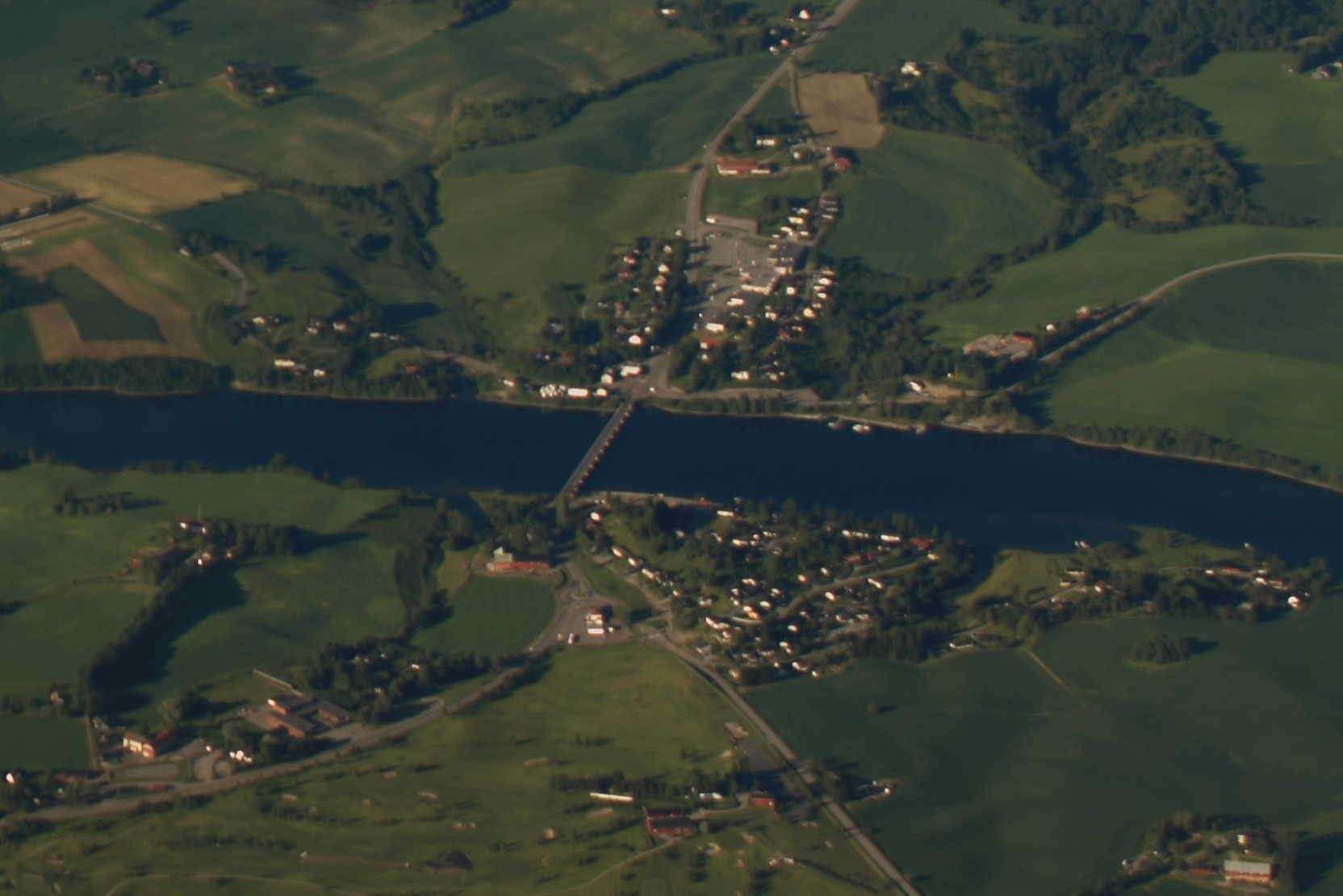

- Location in Akershus
- Coordinates: 60°09′N 11°26′E
- Country: Norway
- Region: Østlandet
- County: Akershus
- District: Nes
- Time zone: UTC+01:00 (CET)
  - Summer (DST): UTC+02:00 (CEST)

Vormsund is a village in the municipality of Nes, Akershus, Norway. Its population (2005) is 461.
