= Nes Municipality (Akershus) =

Nes Municipality Nes kommune
- Municipality
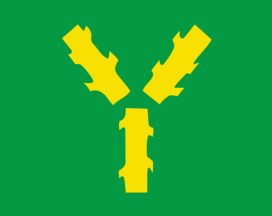
- Flag Coat of arms

- Akershus within Norway

- Nes within Akershus
- Coordinates: 60°7′51″N 11°29′21″E
- Country: Norway
- County: Akershus
- District: Romerike
- Administrative centre: Årnes

Government
  - Mayor (2007): Oddmar Blekkerud (Ap)

Area
  - Total: 637 km^{2} (246 sq mi)
  - Land: 609 km^{2} (235 sq mi)
  - Rank: #177 in Norway

Population (2017)
  - Total: 21,513
  - Rank: #53 in Norway
  - Density: 35/km^{2} (91/sq mi)
  - Change (10 years): ▲ +15.7%
- Demonym: Nesbu

Official language
  - Norwegian form: Bokmål
- Time zone: UTC+01:00 (CET)
  - Summer (DST): UTC+02:00 (CEST)
- ISO 3166 code: NO-3228
- Website: Official website

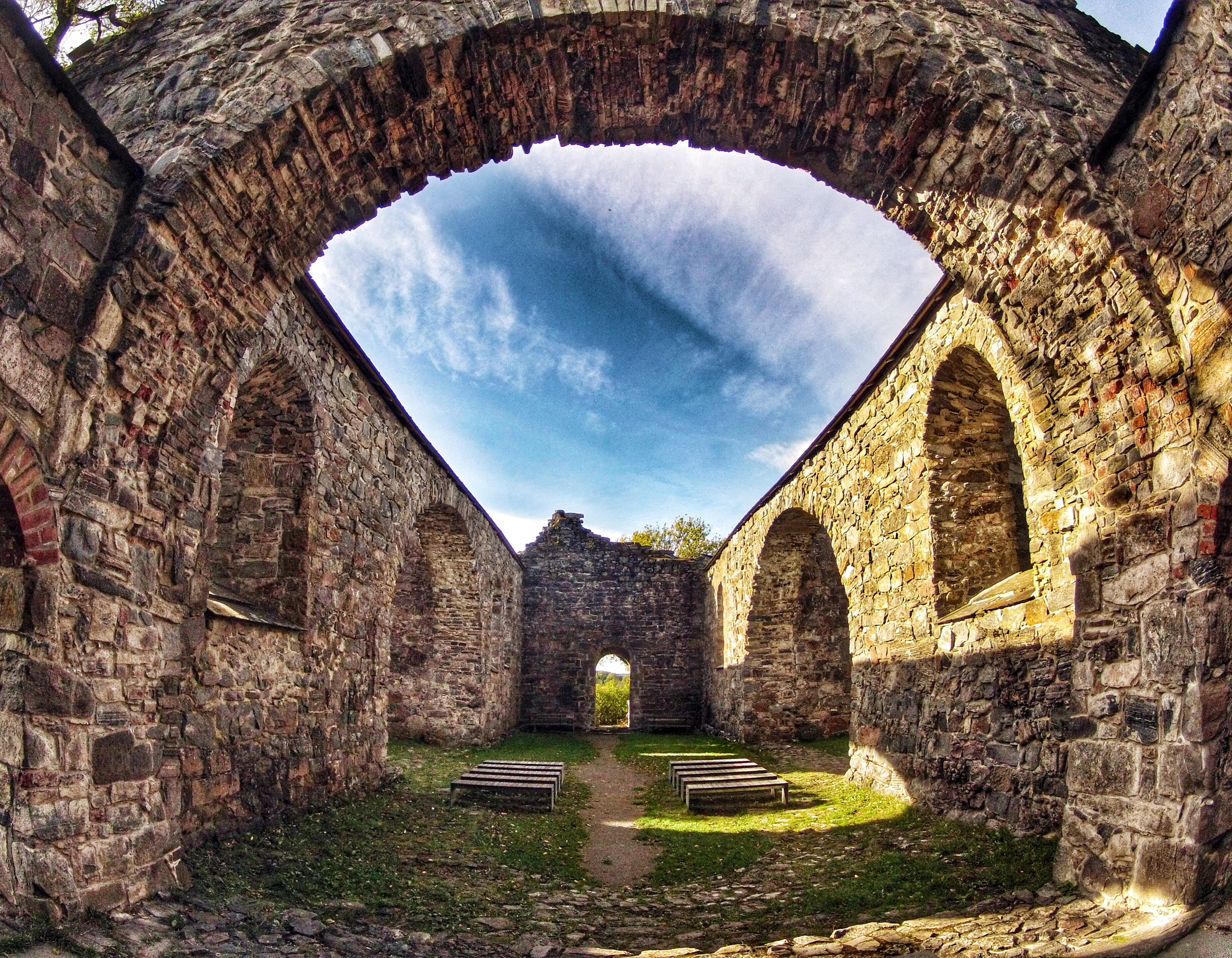
Nes Church ruins

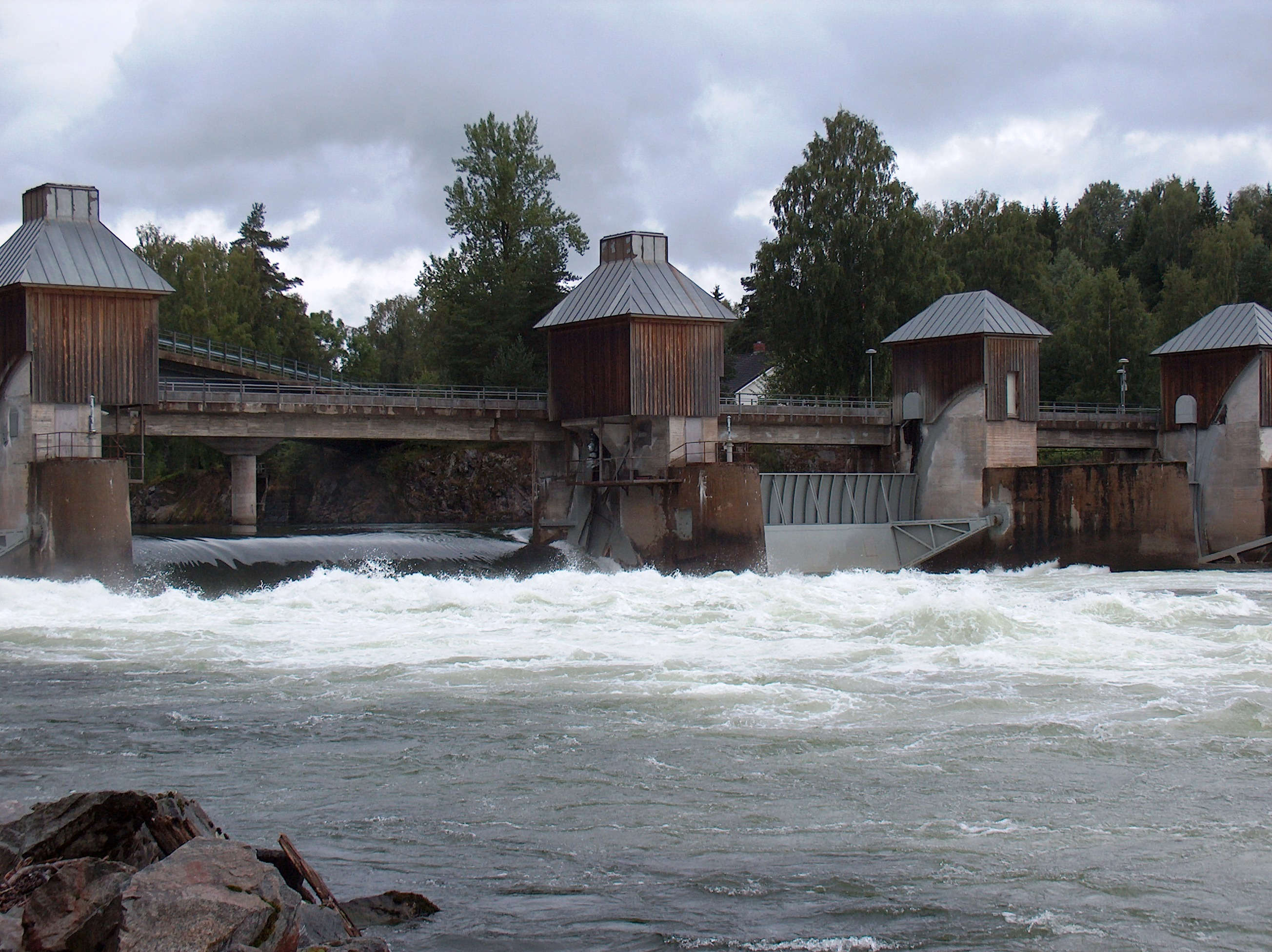
Svanfossen on the river Vorma in Fenstad

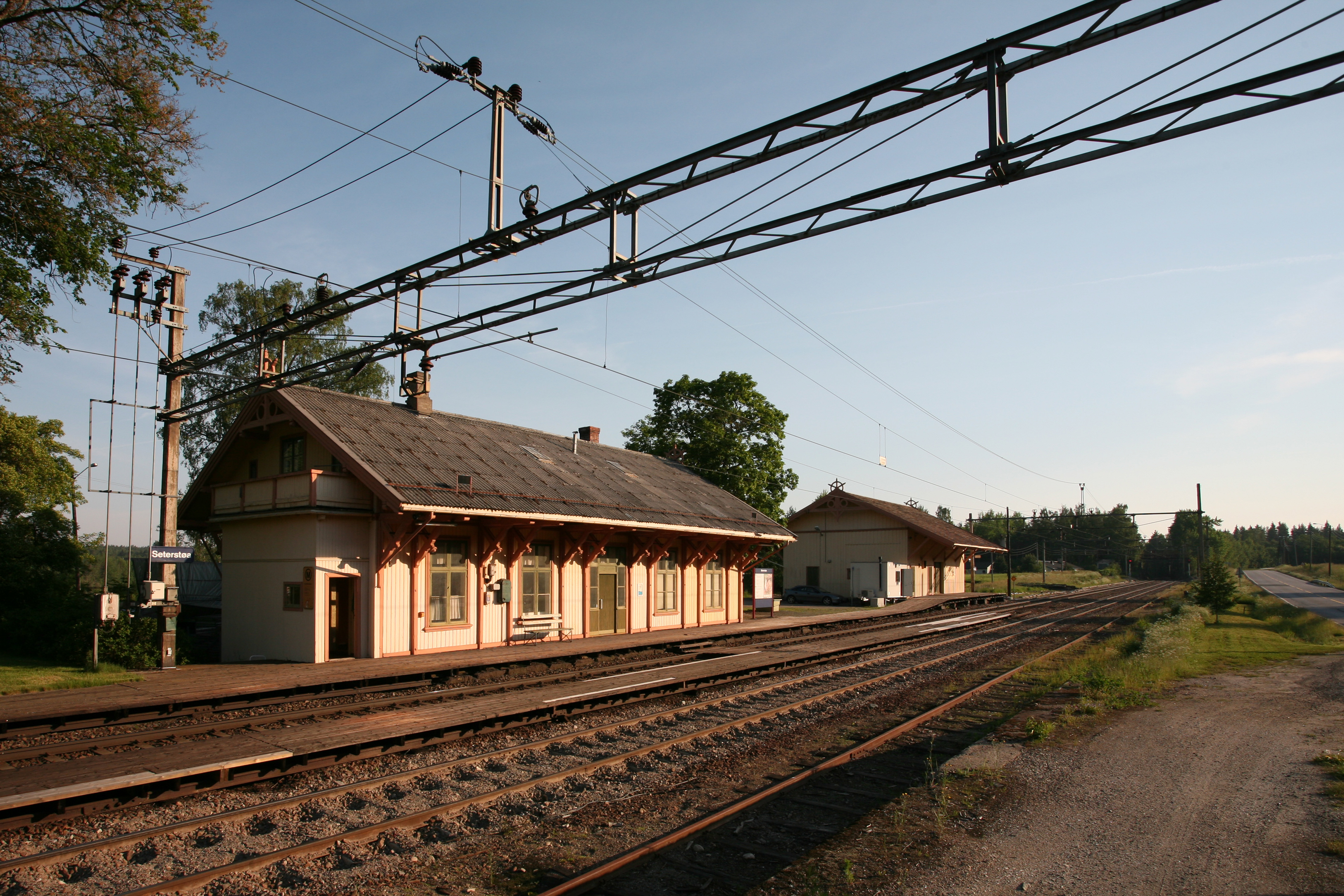
Seterstøa station in Nes was built in 1862

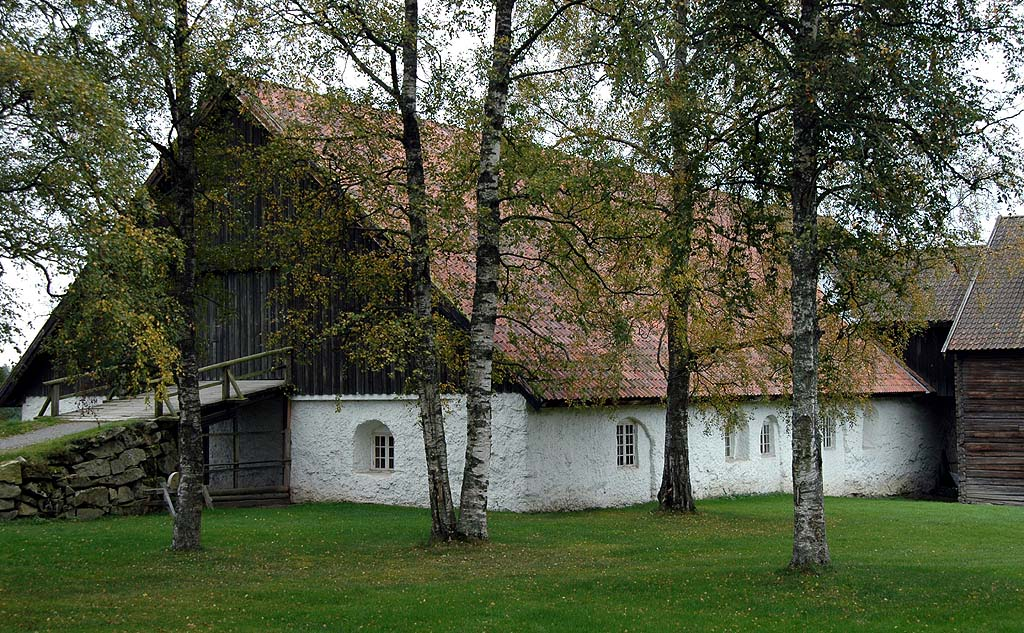
Gamle Hvam Museum in Nes

Nes is a municipality in Akershus county, Norway. It is part of the traditional region of Romerike. The administrative centre of the municipality is the village of Årnes.

== Name ==
The municipality (originally the parish) is named after the old Nes farm (Old Norse: Nes which means "headland"), since the first church was built here. The actual nes is the headland made by the two great rivers Glomma and Vorma, which have their meeting point just south of the farm. Prior to 1889, the name was spelled "Næs".

== Coat-of-arms ==
The coat-of-arms is from modern times. They were granted in 1988. The arms show three yellow logs (to represent forestry) on a green background (to symbolize youth and hope). The position of the logs represents the meeting of the rivers Glomma and Vorma, creating the headland of Nes.

== History ==
The parish of Næs was established as a municipality of its own on 1 January 1838 (see formannskapsdistrikt).

== Nes Church Ruins ==
Nes Church ruins (Nes kirkeruin) are one of Norway's best preserved church ruins. The church which dated from ca 1100 was designed in Romanesque style and was extended into a cruciform church in 1697. The old medieval stone was located near the juncture of two rivers; Glomma and Vorma. The church suffered fire damage in 1854. After the fire the walls were preserved as ruins. The new Nes Church was completed in 1860.

== Geography ==
The municipality borders Eidsvoll, Ullensaker, Lillestrøm, and Aurskog-Høland in Akershus county and Eidskog, Sør-Odal, and Nord-Odal in Innlandet county.

Nes includes many natural attractions, such as parts of the river Glomma, as well as 168 lakes. Elk, beaver, wolf, and lynx can be found here. Hunting and sportfishing are very prevalent.

Eight hundred farms make the area one of the largest producers of wheat in the country.

=== Villages ===
- Årnes
- Vormsund
- Skogrand
- Aulifeltet
- Neskollen
- Fenstad
- Brårud
- Fjellfoten
- Haga

== Demography ==
Number of minorities (1st and 2nd generation) in Nes by country of origin in 2017
| Ancestry | Number |
|---|---|
| Poland | 461 |
| Lithuania | 257 |
| Sweden | 141 |
| Russia | 134 |
| Germany | 116 |
| Eritrea | 115 |
| Thailand | 106 |
| Denmark | 105 |
| Pakistan | 97 |
| Philippines | 85 |

== Notable people ==
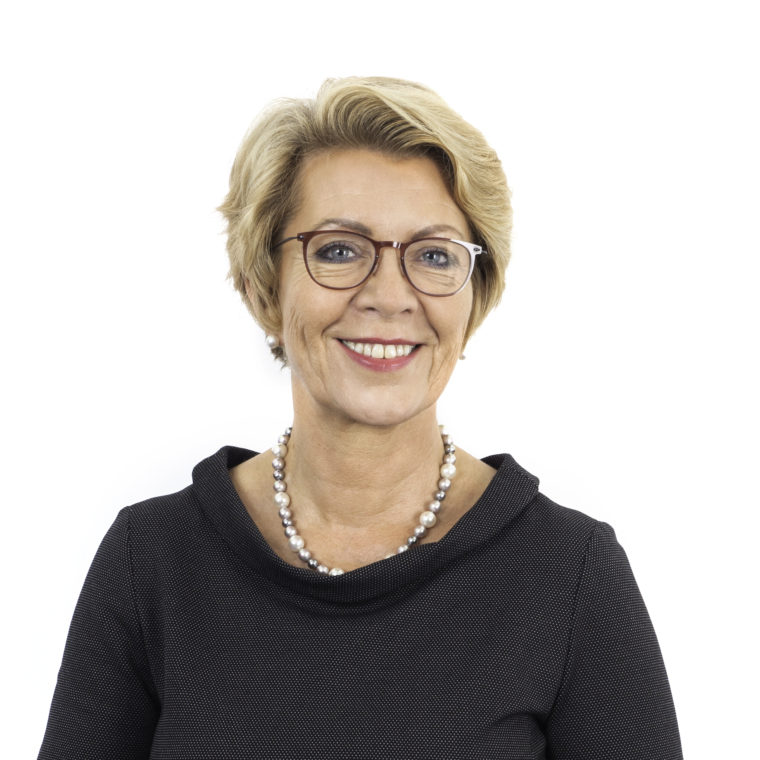
Åslaug Marie Haga, 2016

- Gudbrand Bøhn (1839 in Nes – 1906) a violinist, concertmaster and music teacher
- Ivar Throndsen (1853 in Nes – 1932) an engraver, worked at the Royal Mint in Kongsberg
- Harald Otto (1865 in Nes – 1928) a Norwegian actor and theater director
- Åsmund Esval (1889 in Nes – 1971) a Norwegian landscape painter
- Odd Fossengen (1945 in Nes – 2017) a Norwegian international motorcycle speedway rider
- Åslaug Haga (born 1959 in Nes) diplomat, politician and international civil servant

=== Sport ===
- John Møller (1866 in Nes – 1935) a rifle shooter, team silver medallist at the 1906 Summer Olympics
- Geir Frigård (born 1970 in Vormsund) a former professional footballer with 339 club caps and 5 for Norway
- twins Lotta Udnes Weng & Tiril Udnes Weng (born 1996 in Nes) Norwegian cross-country skiers
