= P. bidentata =

P. bidentata may refer to:

- Paramoera bidentata, an amphipod crustacean
- Perforatella bidentata, a land snail
- Phaonia bidentata, a fly first described in 1933
- Phoneyusa bidentata, a large arachnid
- Piranga bidentata, an American songbird
- Pyrene bidentata, a sea snail
