= Paramoera walkeri =

Scientific classification
- Domain: Eukaryota
- Kingdom: Animalia
- Phylum: Arthropoda
- Class: Malacostraca
- Order: Amphipoda
- Family: Pontogeneiidae
- Genus: Paramoera
- Species: P. walkeri

Binomial name
- Paramoera walkeri (Stebbing, 1906)

Synonyms
- Atylus antarcticus (Walker, 1903); Atylus walkeri (Stebbing, 1906); Bovallia walkeri (Stebbing, 1906); Paramoera antarcticus (Walker, 1903)

Species of crustacean

Paramoera walkeri is an amphipod of the genus Paramoera. It lives around Antarctica.

== Description ==
Like all amphipods, P. walkeri are sexually dimorphic: the males may grow up to 21.7 millimetres (0.85 in); females, 22.8 millimetres (0.90 in). Newborns are approximately 2.5 millimetres (0.098 in). Males mature after 14–15 months, at about 50% their final size. Juvenile P. walkeri are more sensitive to hydrocarbons, such as from oil spills, than older specimens.

== Distribution ==
P. walkeri live in the benthic zone of the Southern Ocean, all around Antarctica, down to a depth of 310 metres (1,020 ft). During the early winter, P. walkeri migrate upward to the ice, and many congregate around patches of algae, in such abundance that they nearly cover the underside of the sea ice sheets. They are also found in the sublittoral zone, and the bottom level of other shallow locations around the Antarctic coast.

== Behavior ==
As omnivores, they eat phytoplankton, cryophilic flora, and Diphyllobothrium tapeworms, among other organisms, under the top level of ice. During the summer, their metabolism increases by 80% compared to winter levels. Predators include Trematomus borchgrevinki, T. newnesii, T. bernacchii, Notothenia corriiceps neglecta, and Adélie penguins.

During a female's second (occasionally third) winter, she releases pheromones, picked up by a male's antennae, signaling that readiness to mate. The male then clings on to the female until she molts. The male releases its sperm into the female's marsupium, and the female releases up to 200 eggs. When the sea water becomes diluted, the eggs may swell up, to keep the total salinity around the embryos constant. They develop for four-and-a-half months, then hatch in the marsupium. The brooding young remain there for up to a month.

== Taxonomic history ==
This species was discovered by Thomas Roscoe Rede Stebbing in 1878, named Atylus antarcticus in 1903, and described as Atylus walkeri in 1906. It was named after Alfred O. Walker, a fellow of the Linnean Society.
