= Liga Nacional de Fútbol Profesional =

Spanish national association football organization

- Formation: 27 July 1984; 42 years ago
- Type: Sports association
- Headquarters: Calle Torrelaguna 60, Ciudad Lineal, Madrid, Spain
- Region served: Spain, Andorra
- Members: 42 football clubs
- President: Javier Tebas
- Main organ: General Assembly
- Affiliations: European Leagues

The Liga Nacional de Fútbol Profesional (Note: Spanish pronunciation: [ˈliɣa naθjoˈnal de ˈfuðβol pɾofesjoˈnal].) (transl. National Professional Football League), also known as LALIGA (the abbreviation LFP was used until the 2015–16 season), is a sports association responsible for administering the two professional football leagues in Spain, the Primera and Segunda Divisions, or LALIGA EA SPORTS and LALIGA HYPERMOTION for sponsorship reasons. Movistar+ and DAZN hold the broadcasting rights until 2032 and can each screen five matches per day.

Founded in 1984, the organisation has independent legal status from the Spanish Football Federation (RFEF) and it is autonomous in its operations. Its main role, in addition to defending its members' interests, is to organise the National League Championship in conjunction with the RFEF.

LaLiga has been detecting and denouncing attitudes of racism, xenophobia and violence to the RFEF Competition Committee and the Spanish State Anti-Violence Commission for years. Faced with what LaLiga considered to be inaction on the part of these bodies, it filed a complaint with the Hate Prosecutor's Office some time ago. However, due to the disparate criteria and the lack of convictions by the prosecutor's office, LaLiga went a step further and since the 2022–23 season has gone directly to court in the case of racist insults. This route, although it is starting to produce results, is slow. That is why, given the lack of sanctions and sentences for what LaLiga denounces, LaLiga has requested sanctioning powers to decree the total or partial closure of sports venues, the prohibition of access to the same and the imposition of economic sanctions. LaLiga has also stated that if they are given the sanctioning powers, they will put an end to racism in football in a matter of months.

The Liga Nacional de Fútbol Profesional rejected the European Super League from the outset, considering it an exclusive and exclusionary championship that did not reward sporting merit, eliminated national leagues as a vehicle for earning a place in the European elite, and based its governance model on the power of wealthy clubs.

LaLiga is headquartered at the Murano Building, in Calle de Torrelaguna 60, Madrid. Since 2013, Javier Tebas serves as the chairman of the organisation.

== Competition: National League Championship ==
The 42 member clubs of LaLiga are grouped into two divisions: Primera División or LALIGA EA SPORTS (20 clubs) and Segunda División or LALIGA HYPERMOTION (22 clubs). In any given season a club plays each of the others in the same division twice, once at their home stadium and once at that of their opponents. This makes for a total of 38 games played each season in Primera División and 42 in Segunda División. Clubs gain three points for a win, one for a draw, and none for a defeat. At the end of each season, the club with the most points in Primera División is crowned Spanish champions. If points are equal, the head-to-head records determine the winner. If still equal, the goal difference and then goals scored become the deciding factors. As for Segunda División, at the top end three clubs win promotion to Primera, with the bottom three LALIGA clubs taking their places. At the lower end, four clubs are relegated to Primera Federación, while four teams from Primera Federación join Segunda instead.

The National League Championship has only been interrupted on two occasions throughout its history, during the Spanish Civil War (1936–1939) and in 2020 due to the COVID-19 pandemic. The competitions were suspended between 9 March and 11 June 2020, when they began again without spectators.

== LaLiga Teams ==
Primera División LALIGA EA SPORTS	Segunda División LALIGA HYPERMOTION
Alavés; Athletic Club; Atlético de Madrid; Barcelona; Celta Vigo; Elche; Espanyol; Getafe; Girona; Levante; Mallorca; Osasuna; Rayo Vallecano; Real Betis; Real Madrid; Real Oviedo; Real Sociedad; Sevilla; Valencia; Villarreal	Albacete; Almería; Andorra; Burgos; Cádiz; Castellón; Ceuta; Córdoba; Cultural Leonesa; Deportivo La Coruña; Eibar; Granada; Huesca; Las Palmas; Leganés; Málaga; Mirandés; Racing de Santander; Real Sociedad B; Real Zaragoza; Sporting Gijón; Real Valladolid

== Organisation ==
Headquartered in Madrid, the institution is also present in 55 countries through its 11 offices and 46 delegates. The majority of the association's social outreach work is carried out by its Foundation. Featuring amongst LaLiga's main responsibilities is the organisation of the professional football competitions, the implementation of a financial control system, managing the centralised sale of the audiovisual rights and overseeing an internationalisation and technology leadership strategy. During the COVID-19 pandemic and in light of the announcement of a state of alarm that saw citizens confined to their homes, LaLiga organised various cultural and sports events online.

=== General Assembly ===
The General Assembly is the deliberative assembly of la "Liga Nacional de Fútbol Profesional". It is composed of the 42 football clubs and public limited sports companies (Sociedad Anónima Deportiva, S.A.D.) that make up the Primera and Segunda División. Each club/S.A.D. is usually represented by its respective president.

=== President ===
The president, along with the other members of the executive committee, is responsible for the day-to-day running of the organisation. The current president is Javier Tebas, who was elected to the post in April 2013 and re-elected in October 2016 and in December 2019.

President	Club	Term
Manuel Vega-Arango Alvaré	Sporting Gijón	1983–1984
Antonio Baró Armengol	Espanyol	11 December 1984 – 11 February 2001
Pedro Tomás Marqués	Espanyol	11 February 2001 – 9 June 2004
José Luis Astiazarán (interim)	Real Sociedad	9 June 2004 – 22 June 2005
Guillermo Cabello Valero (interim)	Terrassa	22 June 2005
Carlos del Campo Cola (interim)	N/A	2005
José Luis Astiazarán	Real Sociedad	15 July 2005 – 26 April 2013
Javier Tebas Medrano	N/A	26 April 2013 – present

== Name and sponsorships ==
In its first statutes, which were passed in 1984, the organisation was officially named as the Liga Nacional de Fútbol Profesional, although amongst the media and supporters the institution's name was shortened and informally referred to as "La Liga" or "Liga de Fútbol Profesional", with the acronym "LFP" commonly used.

In the 1996/97 season, the media began to refer to the competition by its nickname, "Liga de las estrellas" ('League of the stars'). The onset of financial prosperity, conversion of clubs to SADs, sale of audiovisual rights and the Bosman ruling, which enabled greater movement of European Union footballers (and other foreigners, including South American and African players), attracted the best foreign footballers and saw the Spanish game take off once and for all. At this time, the competition was often referred to as the Liga de Fútbol Profesional (LFP), despite this not being its official name.

This unofficial moniker, which didn't represent any issue amongst the Spanish media, did begin to prove problematic, given that it was identical to and featured the same acronym as France's Ligue de Football Professionnel (LFP).

The competition's first sponsorship agreement was signed with BBVA. From 2008, the top flight's name featured BBVA, its lead sponsor, and was known as the Liga BBVA, whilst the second rung was referred to as the Liga Adelante. The sponsorship deal with BBVA ran up until the 2015/16 campaign.

On 21 July 2016, the association signed a three-year sponsorship deal with Santander Bank. This saw the name of the league regain independence as it came to be known as LaLiga whilst the organisation's corporate identity was revamped. The sponsorship agreement with Santander Bank resulted in new names for the institution's two main competitions. The top flight was renamed as LaLiga Santander, whilst the second tier would now be known as LaLiga 1|2|3. The latter underwent another name change in August 2019, when it became known as LaLiga SmartBank.

Following the sponsorship agreement signed with Electronic Arts in 2022, LALIGA EA SPORTS and LALIGA HYPERMOTION are the names of the Primera and Segunda Divisions, starting in the 2023–24 season and for the following four seasons.

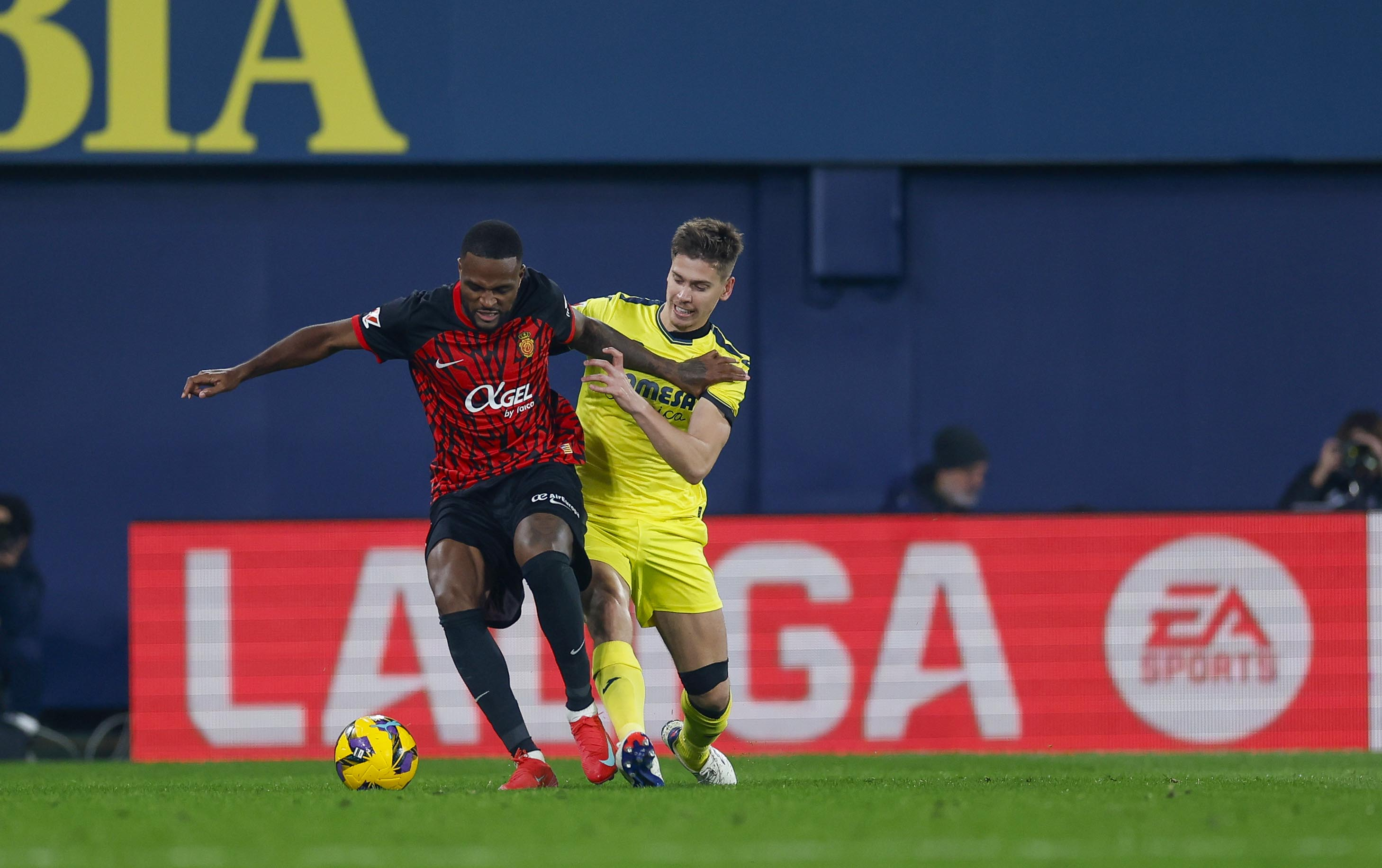
Match between Villarreal CF and RCD Mallorca, 2024–25 season, Estadio de la Cerámica

=== Ball Sponsorship ===
Nike was the official ball supplier of LaLiga for more than 10 seasons between the 1996/97 season and the 2018/19 season, taking over from Adidas. From 2019 to 2020, German sportswear company Puma became the official provider of match balls.

=== Official match ball ===
- 1996–1998: Nike 850 Geo
- 1998–2000: Nike 800 Geo
- 2000–2002: Nike Geo Merlin
- 2002–2004: Nike Geo Merlin Vapor
- 2004–2006: Nike T90 Aerow I
- 2006–2008: Nike T90 Aerow II
- 2008–2009: Nike T90 Omni
- 2009–2010: Nike T90 Ascente
- 2010–2011: Nike T90 Tracer
- 2011–2012: Nike Seitiro
- 2012–2013: Nike Maxim
- 2013–2014: Nike Incyte
- 2014–2015: Nike Ordem 2
- 2015–2016: Nike Ordem 3
- 2016–2017: Nike Ordem 4
- 2017–2018: Nike Ordem 5
- 2018–2019: Nike Merlin
- 2019–present: Puma

== Financial management ==
=== Cleaning up finances and financial controls ===
A process involving a clean-up of Spanish football's finances and the implementation of financial control measures began in 2013 in response to the critical financial plight of the majority of the clubs. In an assembly meeting held on 21 May 2014, the clubs approved the Financial Control Regulations for the National Professional Football League Member Clubs and Public Limited Sports Companies, which saw the clubs and SADs self-impose a series of stricter regulations than those enforced by UEFA and establish that LaLiga would be responsible for overseeing a financial control system and monitoring of its member clubs and SADs.

This saw the clubs and SADs embark on a process during which they settled outstanding player wages and reduced their debts with the Spanish tax authorities (AEAT) and social security. This led to improved financial solvency and established fair competition between clubs, avoiding financial doping.

=== Audiovisual Rights ===
LaLiga's progress and consolidation is also the result of the centralised marketing of the audiovisual rights of the top-flight and second-tier clubs (LALIGA EA SPORTS and LALIGA HYPERMOTION) and public limited sports companies. The centralised sale of audiovisual rights, which represents the clubs' primary source of revenue, was approved during the Congress of Deputies held on 14 May 2015, with the regulations established in the Royal Decree-Law 5/2015.

This legal framework replaced the previous system of individual negotiation by clubs and consolidated the joint marketing of audiovisual rights for competitions organised by LaLiga. The decree law put an end to the tug-of-war between LaLiga, the RFEF and the government, which began in 1997 with the ruling that one game per week must be shown free.

In November 2025, LaLiga awarded Movistar Plus+ (Telefónica) and DAZN the audiovisual rights for the 2027–2032 cycle. This includes the rights to broadcast First and Second Division matches in Spain, as well as associated content. The forecast for domestic audiovisual revenues for the period from 2027–28 to 2031–32 exceeds €6.135 billion, representing an approximate increase of 9% over the previous cycle (2022–27). This figure encompasses both Divisions and the entire five-season cycle, with an aggregate annual amount of around €1 billion per season. In the case of LALIGA EA Sports, Telefónica and DAZN both have the rights to broadcast five matches per matchday, with the matches being distributed equally between them.

=== Socio-economic impact ===
The financial activity generated by LaLiga represents a strategic sector. According to a study published by Price Waterhouse Coopers (PwC) in 2019, the competition generated €15.7 billion in the 2016/17 season, which represented 1.37% of Spain's GDP and provided 185,000 direct and indirect job positions.

The PwC report reveals that the financial impact of the professional football industry in the 2016/17 season was double the levels recorded in the 2012/13 campaign, when its impact was valued at €7.6bn and accounted for 0.75% of Spain's GDP. Meanwhile, the industry's impact on employment opportunities experienced a 28% increase during this same period (rising from 140,000 to 184,600 job positions) and tax receipts rose by 41%, from €3bn to €4.1bn.

Football generates revenue for other businesses that use the game as a lever to generate activity. This 'tractor impact' reveals that of the €2.4bn that supporters spent on matchdays, €1.07bn was spent inside the stadium, €1.23bn in bars and €100bn on tourist activities; €561 million was spent on pay-TV channels and media consumption apiece, whist €261m was spent on betting and €217m on video games.

Every euro of revenue earned by LaLiga generated €4.20 across the rest of the activities and each of the competition's job positions created another four roles in other sectors. In terms of the contribution to Spain's tax coffers, the professional football industry contributed €4.1bn.

STADIUM ATTENDANCE
Season	People	Percentage
2018-2019	14,8 millions of spectators	▲3,77
2019-2020	11,1 millions of spectators	▼25,22
2020-2021*	—	—
2021-2022*	—	—
2022-2023	15,8 millions of spectators	—
2023-2024	16,0 millions of spectators	▲1,27
2024-2025	17,4 millions of spectators	▲8,75

*No official data is available due to the COVID-19 pandemic Source: LaLiga.com

According to the Economic-Financial Report for the 2019–2020 season, the first season affected by the confinement and restrictions of the COVID-19 pandemic, Spanish soccer manifested its strength and sustainability, exceeding 5 billion in revenues for the first time, despite the impact of the pandemic. LaLiga was the only major league competition to achieve a positive net result (77 million euros), and the one that generates the most revenue per capita. All of this was thanks to the responsibility shown by Spanish clubs in containing costs.

According to the Economic and Financial Report for the 2024/25 season, total standardised revenue reached an all-time high of €5.464 billion, an 8.1% increase on the previous season. This growth was driven by record commercial revenue, which exceeded €1.5 billion, as well as the full recovery of stadium activity, with attendance surpassing 17 million for the first time. All of this occurred amid significant investment in infrastructure, cost control, and financial stability.

=== Seasonal Income ===
REVENUE HISTORY BY SEASON
Income	Season
2018-2019	4.877,7 M€
2019-2020	5.065,5 M€
2020-2021	3.945,4 M€
2021-2022	4.255,3 M€
2022-2023	4.892,0 M€
2023-2024	5.053,6 M€
2024-2025	5.464,0 M€

Source: LaLiga

In 2021 LaLiga contributed more than €125 million to other entities for the development of non-professional soccer and other sports. Of this amount, the RFEF received 52% (€65.6 million), the CSD 39.5% (€48.8 million) and the players' unions 8.9% (€11.3 million). This means an increase of 13% with respect to the 19/20 season and 202% with respect to the 14/15 season.

=== LaLiga – CVC agreement ===
In August 2021, LaLiga agreed on the creation, together with the private equity fund CVC Capital Partners, of a holding company and a joint accounts agreement, whereby the fund contributed €2.7 billion in exchange for 10.95% of the profits generated from the commercial exploitation of the different LaLiga products, to be repaid by the clubs over 50 years. The project was called LaLiga Impulse.

LaLiga Impulse was unanimously approved by the clubs at the Delegate Commission of 4 August 2021 and approved at the General Assembly by a majority of 39 clubs (out of 42 in total) on 12 August. At this assembly, Real Madrid CF, FC Barcelona, Athletic Bilbao and Real Oviedo voted against, although the Asturian club finally decided to sign up to the agreement days later to guarantee its sporting project. However, in June 2023, Fútbol Club Barcelona withdrew from the lawsuit against LaLiga and the clubs, leaving only Real Madrid and Athletic Bilbao as the only clubs opposed to the agreement.

The agreement between CVC and LaLiga foresees the possibility of any club opting out or joining at a later date, where the sums corresponding to these clubs are subtracted from the initial amount. Following the decision by the aforementioned clubs not to form part of it, the final amount was set at around €2.1 billion in exchange for a percentage of almost 10.95% of the commercial profits. As for the use made of the funds by the clubs, 70% must be destined to infrastructure, 15% to settling debt, and the remaining 15% for increasing the wage limit for players in the first three years.

=== Sponsorships ===
MAIN SPONSOR: EA SPORTS (2023-2028)
Partners	Type	Partners	Type
Microsoft	Technology partner	Puma	Official ball
BKT	Official tyre	Moeve	Official sponsor
Volkswagen	Official car	Mahou	Official beer
Uber Eats	Official delivery	Riyadh Season	Official sponsor
Montelez	Official flavour	Airbnb	Official accommodation platform
Luckia	Official sponsor	El Corte Inglés	FMCG partner
Haier	Official sponsor	Solán de Cabras	Official water
Feeberse	Official contributor	Legends	Museum
Panini	Global licence	Fanatics	Global licence
Avery Dennison	Global licence	Sorare	Global licence

== Technological resources ==
=== Digitalisation ===
The digitalisation within society has been mirrored in the professional ranks of the Spanish game, resulting in an enhanced audiovisual product and multimedia development. LaLiga boasts a digital ecosystem that revolves around three elements: channels, services and data, which enable clubs and supporters to interact. Through its website, mobile apps and LaLigaSportsTV, the over-the-top platform launched in early 2019, the institution has achieved the participation of those supporters who interact with all of these devices, whilst the services speed up and simplify fan access. All of the data generated as a result of this interaction is used to customise content, affording the association the opportunity to tailor content across all of the channels in the ecosystem.

Data has become an essential element of LaLiga's strategy when it comes to centralising, organising, preparing and providing all of the necessary information to make decision-making more effective and efficient. Over time, the clubs have been provided with the various tools and technological applications based on artificial intelligence, which, amongst other purposes, serve to detect cases of match-fixing and assist when making decisions about kick-off times to ensure optimum stadium attendance and viewing figures.

In 2021, LaLiga developed LaLiga Tech, a digital ecosystem based on artificial intelligence data and digital processes that offers technological solutions for sports and entertainment.

=== Audiovisual production ===
The biggest games in each round of fixtures are recorded using a 4k High Dynamic Range (HDR) system with 20 HDR cameras, whilst for special fixtures (El Clasico or finals) 30 cameras are employed. Since the 2017/18 season, all of the LaLiga stadiums have been equipped with a tactical camera that automatically follows the play and produces a live tactical overview that is made available to the teams' analysts. In addition, the stadiums also boast an aerial camera that is positioned 21 metres above the pitch, and 38 ultra-high definition cameras are located around the stadiums to generate 360º volumetric video clips and provide replays of each move from every angle. In addition, Replay 360 technology is also used to generate virtual graphics during live broadcasts.

=== Technological tools ===
Artificial intelligence, a plentiful supply of data and the use of specific tools serve to assist clubs when it comes to making decisions on certain issues.

Mediacoach offers the 42 top-flight and second-tier teams statistical and analytic data (supplied by GPS cameras that monitor each player) regarding the performance levels of every player. This allows for analysis of the play and the technical-tactical and fitness aspects involved in a game.

Players are provided with access to the Players APP, an exclusive application developed for LaLiga players in conjunction with the Club del Deportista magazine, which provides them with the data collected by Mediacoach and personalised information at the end of every game.

Calendar Selector is a LaLiga-developed tool used to optimise stadium attendance and TV audience figures. An algorithm uses tens of historical variables including kick-off times, TV audiences, stadium attendance figures, league standings, etc. to help to optimise decision-making when it comes to scheduling kick-off time.

Sunlight Broadcasting Planning: This tool involved the reconstruction of the LaLiga stadiums in detailed 3D images. The software allows for a date and kick-off time to be input into the system, which offers a completely accurate picture of the sunlight, light, shade, brightness, etc. and provides a prediction of how this will impact on the supporters and the TV image. This tool is also used to make improved decisions regarding kick-off times.

=== Applications and games ===
As of October 2021, the LaLiga apps had registered over 116 million downloads, of which 80% were from beyond Spain's borders. LaLiga has developed the following apps: the official LaLiga App, Quiniela (football pools), club apps (available for 23 LaLiga clubs), LaLiga Fantasy, Head Football, Tiny Striker LaLiga, LaLiga Top Cards, LaLiga Educational Games and voice assistants (Google, Cortana, Skype, Samsung Bixby, Movistar Home).

In the 2017/18 season, LaLiga entered the virtual world of eSports. During the 2019/20 campaign, the eLaLiga Santander tournament was held as a part of the official EA Sports TM FIFA 20 Global Series in Spain competition, which involved the participation of 33 LaLiga Santander and LaLiga SmartBank teams.

=== Social media ===
In 2024, LaLiga surpassed 230 million followers across its social media channels (in the 2013/14 season its followers numbered just 3.9m).

The institution has 22 accounts across 16 platforms: Facebook, Twitter (LaLiga, LaLigaEN, LaLigaArab, LaLigaBRA, LaLigaFRA, LaLigaJP, LaLigaID, LaLigaTH, LaLigaSports, eSportsLaLiga, Fundación LaLiga), Instagram, YouTube, TikTok, four networks in China (Weibo, WeChat, Douyin, Toutiao); two social media channels in Russia (OK, VK); Line (three accounts: one for Japan, another for Thailand and one for Indonesia).

LaLiga boasts a global audience that spans across the world. The country with the highest number of followers is Spain (7m), followed by Indonesia (over 5.2m); India (more than 5.1m); Mexico (over 5m); Brazil (more than 4.7m) and China and Egypt (over 4m apiece).

When interacting with all of these users, LaLiga communicates in over 20 languages. In addition to addressing followers in Spanish, the institution also communicates its message in English, Arabic, Chinese, French, Japanese, Portuguese, Turkish, Russian, Hindi, Bengali, Indonesia, Thai, Filipino, Danish, Vietnamese, Pidgin English, Swahili, Wolof, Lingala, and Hebrew, amongst other languages.

== Measures against violence, match-fixing ==
One of the objectives actively pursued by LaLiga is to eradicate violence, xenophobia and racism, match-fixing and audiovisual piracy. In December 2023, the LALIGAVS platform brought together the various actions to prevent hate in professional football. Together with the clubs, LaLiga has promoted more than 700 initiatives aimed at education, prevention and action. It has also created the Monitor for the Observation of Hate in Sport (MOOD) to measure the effectiveness and success of its strategies among fans.

Racist conduct is reported to the Spanish courts, to the State Commission against Violence, Racism, Xenophobia and Intolerance in Sport and to the Royal Spanish Football Federation (RFEF) after each matchday. LaLiga's Legal and Integrity and Security departments apply a system of prevention, detection and reporting. LaLiga also acts as a prosecutor in any criminal proceedings related to violence and racism in football. To speed up the identification of these behaviours, the institution has created a reporting channel on its website.

LaLiga submits a weekly report to the RFEF and the Anti-violence Committee with information regarding chants heard during matches that incite violence or feature content that is insulting in nature. The aforementioned bodies are the only ones possessing the authority to impose sanctions.

With regards to match-fixing, in addition to the use of technology, talks on integrity and security are given to all players involved in both leagues. The technology monitors all bookmakers throughout the world and detects any abnormal betting patterns, which are analysed by experts, and where any suspicion arises, the case is referred to the police and legal authorities. In the fight against match-fixing and the detection of cases through the use of technology, clubs have been equipped with tools such as Tyche 3.0. There have been instances where complaints brought by LaLiga have resulted in legal proceedings, as was the case with Operacion Oikos.

== Anti-piracy measures ==
In relation to audiovisual piracy, as well as boasting a specific anti-piracy department of fifty professionals that works alongside other European leagues, the institution advocates legal action, lobbies and works to establish institutional relations to favour the implementation of anti-piracy legislation (both in Spain and abroad). Various legal measures are in place, including fines of up to €450 for consumers who watch pirated football matches on unauthorized channels. The digital tools employed by LaLiga in the pursuit of cases of piracy, including the Marauder software, have been shared with the Spanish Ministry of Culture, which has made significant strides in tackling fraud and intellectual property crime.

On December 18, 2024, Commercial Court No. 6 of Barcelona ruled that La Liga could request the blocking of certain IP addresses used to illegally distribute its audiovisual content.

=== Legal action ===
==== Operation Kratos ====
Led by the Republic of Bulgaria and Europol, it was discovered that the network illegally distributed some 2,500 television channels and reached more than 22 million users worldwide. 560 resellers of the pirated service were identified and drugs and weapons were seized during the raids.

Kratos 2

Operation Kratos 2, was coordinated by Bulgarian authorities with Europol’s support. Between September 2025 and April 2026. Europol reported 29 arrests, 86 identified suspects, nine organised crime groups dismantled and 27,332 URLs removed.

==== Magis TV ====
By 2024, Liga had obtained an order from Argentinian courts for Google to shut down Magis TV platform and all its applications, "to stop it from continuing to operate as a fraudulent Internet TV platform offering access to games".

==== DuckVision ====
LaLiga requested that, in February 2025, telephone operators block IP address ranges belonging to Cloudflare that host websites illegally broadcasting football matches. As a result, the piracy platform DuckVision was shut down before the derby between Real Madrid and Atlético Madrid. The platform had 200,000 users and was backed by Cloudflare.

==== Cloudflare ====
Relying on the court ruling from December 2024, LaLiga began demanding that telephone operators block IP address ranges belonging to Cloudflare for illegally broadcasting soccer matches. Legal IP blocks affected numerous customers using Cloudflare's security and content distribution services during the broadcast of the matches. In response to the blockades, the cybersecurity organization RootedCON and Cloudflare filed a petition to annul the measure due to its indiscriminate blocking of IP addresses. However, the Barcelona court continued to defend the blockades. La Liga defended these actions by accusing Cloudflare of collaborating with piracy for refusing to block sites that La Liga identifies as infringers.

Cloudflare considered that the block was affecting innocent customers and websites that had nothing to do with piracy. Some experts considered that the situation undermined net neutrality.LaLiga provided those affected with an email address to which they could report access issues. It also explained that the disruptions to legitimate services were due to shared IP addresses and Cloudflare’s technical configuration.

There were also incidents affecting Vercel and Netlify. Both had offered to cooperate and had requested to be notified in advance in the event of any service disruptions. Other organisations affected included X, Vimeo, Steam, GitHub and the Royal Spanish Academy. LaLiga reached agreements with Akamai, Twitch, Vercel, Google and Fastly to detect and remove pirated broadcasts.

== Support for sport and society ==
=== LaLiga Sports ===
LaLigaSports was founded in 2016 in response to the commitments made under the Royal Decree-Law 5/2015 and as a means to support other Spanish sports apart from football and boost the sports industry in general. The organisation is made up of 64 federations and receives 1% of the revenue from the sale of football's audiovisual rights. One of the association's objectives is to cover the social security payments of elite athletes who compete in other sporting disciplines, as well as funding their participation in international competitions. The financial assistance, which amounts to 1% of the audiovisual rights, is administered by the CSD, which in the 2018/19 season paid out €13,350,000 across the following three areas: social security, grants and international competitions.

=== LaLigaSportsTV ===
At the start of 2019, LaLiga launched the LaLigaSportsTV platform, an over-the-top service which offers live coverage of a variety of Spanish sports competitions, and that, in addition to football, provides viewers with the latest news of the other sports which receive less media coverage. The platform broadcasts the competitions via streaming, which means that they are available to all users, although some of the coverage is open access and other content requires the payment of a fee. In terms of the football coverage, users must make a prior payment to gain access to LaLiga Hypermotion matches, whilst the rest of the sports are available at no cost (with exceptions). Top-flight football fixtures are not available via the platform, although match highlights and pre- and post-match interviews are offered. In short, the platform provides coverage of a great number of Spanish sports and competitions, but content which is typically paid for (basketball leagues, tennis tournaments, etc.) is not included. At the close of 2019, the platform boasted over 400,000 registered users and featured coverage of 30 sporting disciplines.

=== Women's football ===
A LaLiga department to study and promote the female game and support the clubs in their decision-making in relation to the professionalization and visibility of female players and women's football fixtures was opened in 2015. This department was also a driving force behind the creation of the Spanish Association of Women's Football Clubs, which works to promote a broad range of activities that contribute to the development of ladies' football. When created in 2015, the association had 13 founder members, with this number having risen to 69 participating clubs in 2020.

=== Foundation ===
The Professional Football League's Foundation is a private, cultural organisation, created following a unanimously approved initiative proposed by the National Professional Football League's general assembly. The institution, which is an independent legal entity and a non-profit-making organisation with full functional autonomy, was legally constituted on 5 February 1993.

The Foundation's main objective is the promotion, development, funding, investigation and organisation of cultural activities in general and, in particular, those relating to physical culture and football.

In the pursuit of its objectives, the Foundation runs cultural activities through the awarding of scholarships and study grants for the purposes of sports training, learning and research, artistic competition and promotion, exhibitions, conferences, publications, youth football competitions and any other cultural and sporting events.

Since 2017, the Foundation has organised LaLiga Genuine, a football league for intellectually challenged footballers that features the participation of 36 LaLiga clubs. Among other socio-educational activities, LALIGA Za'atari Social Project has been organised in the Za'atari refugee camp in Jordan since 2020.

=== LaLiga Business School ===
The institution, created to contribute to the training of leaders in the football industry and across other global sports, opened its doors in 2018. Run in conjunction with the Universidad Francisco de Vitoria, the school offers postgraduate studies and a range of other training courses. The school runs the following master's programmes: Law Applied to Professional Football; Management, Methodology and Analysis in Football; and Global Sports Marketing, whilst also providing the following courses: LaLiga eSport, Digital Strategy & Data, and Behind the scenes at a sports event. All of these courses include both theoretical and practical elements and are imparted by seasoned industry professionals.

=== Stay at home: COVID-19 ===
During the course of the COVID-19 crisis, which brought the competition to a temporary standstill, LaLiga organised a series of activities as a part of the Quédate En Casa (Stay At Home) campaign as it created entertainment content that could be enjoyed at home.

The first of these initiatives was LaLiga Santander Challenge, a FIFA 20 tournament contested by one representative from each of the LaLiga squads, with Real Madrid's Marco Asensio ultimately prevailing as victor. Followed by over a million users, the competition raised €180,000 towards the battle against COVID-19.

The institution also organised LaLiga Santander Fest, a music festival featuring a line-up of famous artists and footballers, who took part from their homes as they contributed to raising funds for the purchase of medical supplies.

Elsewhere, LaLiga's partners in China assisted during the health crisis by donating 170,000 facemasks. All of these initiatives saw LaLiga make the following donations to Spanish society: 1,435,000 high-risk facemasks, 115 non-invasive respirators, 12,595 disposable, sterile gowns and 500,000 sets of gloves.

== International growth ==
The rise in interest in the Spanish game has prompted the global expansion of the National Professional Football League, which has been grounded on three fundamental cornerstones: its international offices, the Global Network and the joint-venture partnerships that the institution has established across the world. The institution's international offices are located in: Belgium (Brussels), China (Shanghai and Beijing), South Africa (Johannesburg), the United States (New York), the United Arab Emirates (Dubai), India (New Delhi), Nigeria (Lagos), Mexico (Mexico City), Singapore (Singapore), the UK (London) and Spain (Madrid and Barcelona).

The LaLiga Global Network is formed by 44 delegates, who are based in locations throughout 41 countries. Featuring amongst the joint-venture partnerships signed by the institution are LaLiga North America, in conjunction with RELEVENT, that aims to introduce the Spanish game into the United States. LaLiga was recognised at the WFS Industry Awards 2019 for Best Internationalisation Strategy.

In 2020, LaLiga was named as the Honorary Ambassador of Brand Spain in the international relations category, "on account of its contribution to offering a positive image of Spain across the world through football" and "assisting the internationalisation of both Spanish companies and athletes."

== See also ==
- Spanish football league system
- Royal Spanish Football Federation
