= José Luis Astiazarán =

Spanish football player and administrator (born 1963)

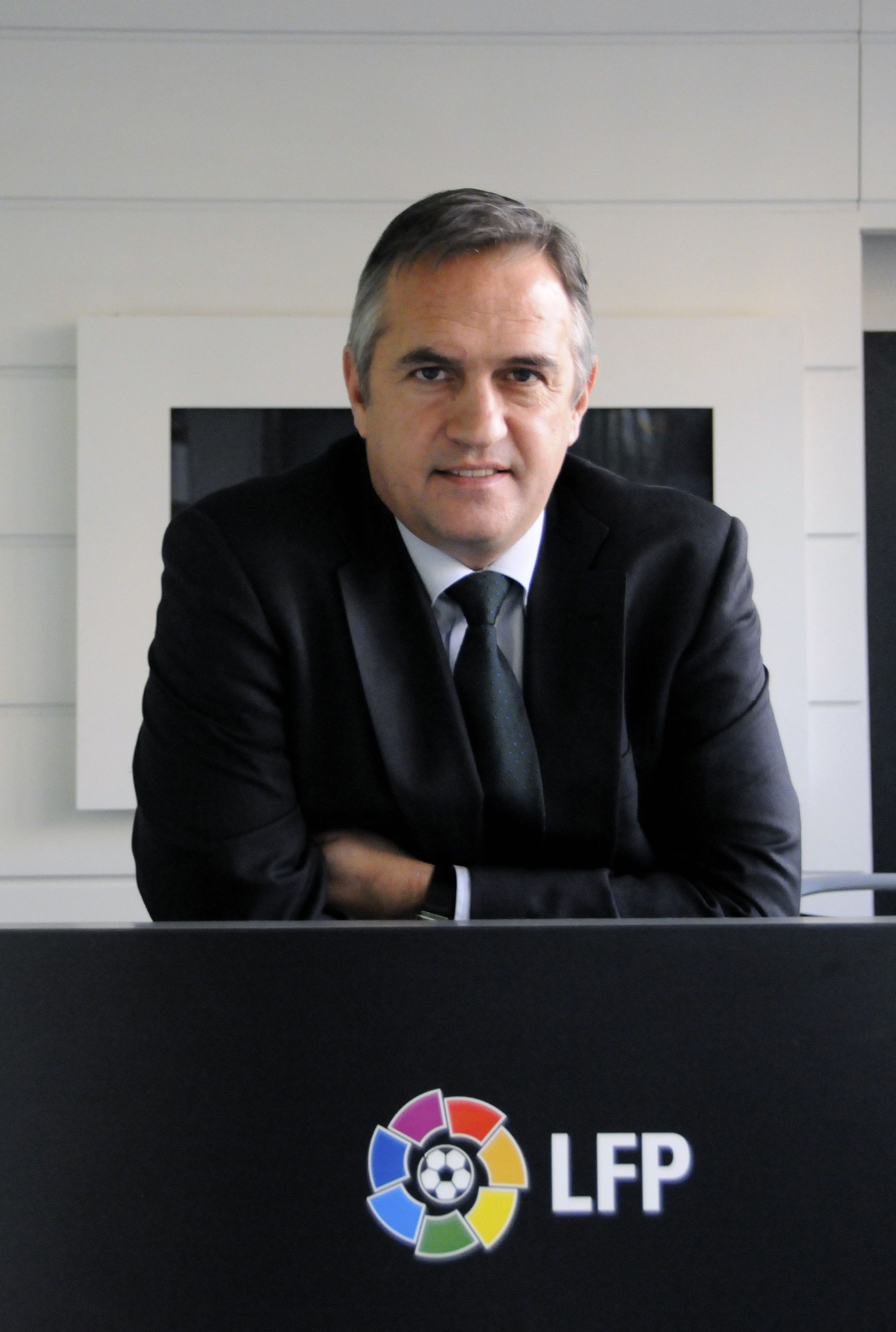

President of the Liga de Fútbol Profesional
- In office 15 July 2005 – 26 April 2013
- Vice President: Javier Tebas
- Preceded by: Pedro Tomás
- Succeeded by: Javier Tebas

Personal details
- Born: José Luis Astiazarán Iriondo; 31 October 1963 (age 62) Mexico City, Mexico
- Occupation: Lawyer

José Luis Astiazarán Iriondo (born 31 October 1963) is a Spanish lawyer specializing in sport and commercial and civil law, and between 2005 and 2013 president of Liga Nacional de Fútbol Profesional.

== Football career ==
Astiazarán was born in Mexico City, Mexico to a Spanish couple of Basque descent, returning to his parents' region of birth shortly after. A forward, he graduated from Real Sociedad's youth academy but only represented its reserves as a senior, the same happening at his following team, Athletic Bilbao.

Astiazarán played professionally for Sestao Sport Club– also in his native region – and Bilbao Athletic, appearing in a total of 43 Segunda División matches during his short career (four goals). In 1992 he returned to his first club, working with its board of directors until 2001.

== Law career ==
While still working with Real Sociedad as a director, Astiazarán also acted as legal adviser for athletes, companies and institutions in the sports sector. He became president of the club on 22 March 2001 and left the position in 2005, leaving the club in a poor sporting and economic situation – €10 million worth of debt.

On 15 July 2005, Astiazarán was appointed president of the Liga de Fútbol Profesional (Professional Football League), the body governing both La Liga and the second division. Having earlier served as vice president and member of the board of directors in the organization, he won the election unanimously, with all but three clubs – Real Sociedad, SD Eibar and CA Osasuna – showing him support; he was re-elected in April 2009 for another period of four years, and in 2013 Javier Tebas took over as president after he did not present himself for reelection.

Astiazarán was a member of the European Professional Football Leagues board of directors, and a member of the FIFA Player's Status Committee sub-committee which verified the transfers of minor players. In mid-May 2009, he claimed the 6+5 rule would not have a negative impact on Spanish football.
