= EU status (football) =

European Union citizen status for labour law purposes

EU status in association football is whether a football player is considered a citizen of the European Union (EU) for the purposes of labour law within domestic European football leagues. There are different rules for which players are eligible for EU status in different European leagues, and leagues have different rules on how many players from outside the EU may be registered. Players within European league systems who are not considered European citizens are known as "non-EU".

== History ==
In the 1995 Bosman ruling, the conclusion of a case regarding freedom of transfers, restrictions on foreign EU players in EU national leagues were banned. A previous 1992 ruling had determined that EU states could not distinguish between EU citizens born in an EU nation and those born abroad who had jus sanguinis citizenship. The 2003 Kolpak ruling ruled in favour of EU status in sports applying also to EU-based citizens of nations which have an Association Agreement with the EU but are not members; the major effect of this was due to the Cotonou Agreement, which spurred European naturalisation of players from the Organisation of African, Caribbean and Pacific States. A major football market to recognise the Cotonou Agreement as EU qualifying is Spain; it was ratified in Spain when La Liga allowed teams to have only three non-EU players registered.

Though the United Kingdom signed a Trade and Cooperation Agreement with the EU following Brexit, British players are not automatically considered EU qualified: in 2023, British footballer Tosin Adarabioyo reportedly applied for a Nigerian passport so that he could transfer to an EU league, while in 2022 dual-national England international Lucy Bronze was registered as Portuguese when moving to Barcelona. Switzerland also has a series of agreements with the EU, but its players are not automatically considered EU qualified. In EU leagues that do not recognise British and Swiss as EU, young players may be restricted on joining, and players who join will take an international squad spot. Spain considers Swiss players as EU players and, since July 2023, Italy has treated both British and Swiss players as EU players.

The concern of EU status predominantly affects young players who may otherwise find it hard to meet visa requirements.

== Nationalities eligible for EU status ==
National citizenship providing EU status
Group	Nation	EU status	Notes
European Union	Austria	Yes	
European Union	Belgium	Yes	
European Union	Bulgaria	Yes	
European Union	Croatia	Yes	
European Union	Cyprus	Yes	
European Union	Czech Republic	Yes	
European Union	Denmark	Yes	Including e.g., Faroe Islanders and Greenlanders.
European Union	Estonia	Yes	
European Union	Finland	Yes	
European Union	France	Yes	Including Overseas France.
European Union	Germany	Yes	
European Union	Greece	Yes	
European Union	Hungary	Yes	
European Union	Ireland	Yes	Irish nationality law: Generational inheritance of Irish citizenship requires a person be born to (or adopted by) a parent or grandparent entitled to Irish citizenship, regardless of where they were born, as long as births outside Ireland are registered.
European Union	Italy	Yes	Italian nationality law: Generational inheritance of Italian citizenship is, for most practical purposes, automatic and unlimited, regardless of where someone was born or if their ancestors in the generations since one was Italian-born ever claimed this citizenship.
European Union	Latvia	Yes	
European Union	Lithuania	Yes	
European Union	Luxembourg	Yes	
European Union	Malta	Yes	
European Union	Netherlands	Yes	
European Union	Poland	Yes	
European Union	Portugal	Yes	
European Union	Romania	Yes	
European Union	Slovakia	Yes	
European Union	Slovenia	Yes	
European Union	Spain	Yes	
European Union	Sweden	Yes	
EAA or EUCU	Andorra	Yes	
EAA or EUCU	Iceland	Yes	
EAA or EUCU	Liechtenstein	Yes	
EAA or EUCU	Monaco	Yes	
EAA or EUCU	Norway	Yes	
EAA or EUCU	San Marino	Yes	
Special agreement	Switzerland	Yes	
United Kingdom, its Territories and Dependencies	Northern Ireland	Usually	Irish nationality law: Since 2005, people born anywhere on the island of Ireland, including UK country Northern Ireland, are entitled to Irish citizenship if: at least one of their parents is British, or Irish, or entitled to live in Ireland; or: at least one of their parents was resident on the island of Ireland for three of the four years prior to their birth; or: they are not entitled to any other citizenship. Prior to 1999, people born in Northern Ireland were entitled to Irish citizenship by declaration. In the intervening years, people born in Northern Ireland were entitled to Irish citizenship by birth. Therefore, most people born in Northern Ireland are entitled to Irish nationality, and so eligible for EU status.
United Kingdom, its Territories and Dependencies	England	Maybe	Since 2023, the Italian Football Federation recognises British citizens as having EU status.
United Kingdom, its Territories and Dependencies	Gibraltar	Maybe	Since 2023, the Italian Football Federation recognises British citizens as having EU status.
United Kingdom, its Territories and Dependencies	Scotland	Maybe	Since 2023, the Italian Football Federation recognises British citizens as having EU status.
United Kingdom, its Territories and Dependencies	Wales	Maybe	Since 2023, the Italian Football Federation recognises British citizens as having EU status.
Cotonou Agreement	Angola	Maybe	As of 2018, players in Europe under the Cotonou Agreement are recognised as EU eligible in Denmark, Finland, France, Hungary, Romania, and Spain.
Cotonou Agreement	Antigua and Barbuda	Maybe	As of 2018, players in Europe under the Cotonou Agreement are recognised as EU eligible in Denmark, Finland, France, Hungary, Romania, and Spain.
Cotonou Agreement	Bahamas	Maybe	As of 2018, players in Europe under the Cotonou Agreement are recognised as EU eligible in Denmark, Finland, France, Hungary, Romania, and Spain.
Cotonou Agreement	Barbados	Maybe	As of 2018, players in Europe under the Cotonou Agreement are recognised as EU eligible in Denmark, Finland, France, Hungary, Romania, and Spain.
Cotonou Agreement	Belize	Maybe	As of 2018, players in Europe under the Cotonou Agreement are recognised as EU eligible in Denmark, Finland, France, Hungary, Romania, and Spain.
Cotonou Agreement	Benin	Maybe	As of 2018, players in Europe under the Cotonou Agreement are recognised as EU eligible in Denmark, Finland, France, Hungary, Romania, and Spain.
Cotonou Agreement	Botswana	Maybe	As of 2018, players in Europe under the Cotonou Agreement are recognised as EU eligible in Denmark, Finland, France, Hungary, Romania, and Spain.
Cotonou Agreement	Burkina Faso	Maybe	As of 2018, players in Europe under the Cotonou Agreement are recognised as EU eligible in Denmark, Finland, France, Hungary, Romania, and Spain.
Cotonou Agreement	Burundi	Maybe	As of 2018, players in Europe under the Cotonou Agreement are recognised as EU eligible in Denmark, Finland, France, Hungary, Romania, and Spain.
Cotonou Agreement	Cameroon	Maybe	As of 2018, players in Europe under the Cotonou Agreement are recognised as EU eligible in Denmark, Finland, France, Hungary, Romania, and Spain.
Cotonou Agreement	Cape Verde	Maybe	As of 2018, players in Europe under the Cotonou Agreement are recognised as EU eligible in Denmark, Finland, France, Hungary, Romania, and Spain.
Cotonou Agreement	Central African Republic	Maybe	As of 2018, players in Europe under the Cotonou Agreement are recognised as EU eligible in Denmark, Finland, France, Hungary, Romania, and Spain.
Cotonou Agreement	Chad	Maybe	As of 2018, players in Europe under the Cotonou Agreement are recognised as EU eligible in Denmark, Finland, France, Hungary, Romania, and Spain.
Cotonou Agreement	Comoros	Maybe	As of 2018, players in Europe under the Cotonou Agreement are recognised as EU eligible in Denmark, Finland, France, Hungary, Romania, and Spain.
Cotonou Agreement	Congo	Maybe	As of 2018, players in Europe under the Cotonou Agreement are recognised as EU eligible in Denmark, Finland, France, Hungary, Romania, and Spain.
Cotonou Agreement	Cook Islands	Maybe	As of 2018, players in Europe under the Cotonou Agreement are recognised as EU eligible in Denmark, Finland, France, Hungary, Romania, and Spain.
Cotonou Agreement	Cuba	Maybe	As of 2018, players in Europe under the Cotonou Agreement are recognised as EU eligible in Denmark, Finland, France, Hungary, Romania, and Spain.
Cotonou Agreement	Djibouti	Maybe	As of 2018, players in Europe under the Cotonou Agreement are recognised as EU eligible in Denmark, Finland, France, Hungary, Romania, and Spain.
Cotonou Agreement	Dominica	Maybe	As of 2018, players in Europe under the Cotonou Agreement are recognised as EU eligible in Denmark, Finland, France, Hungary, Romania, and Spain.
Cotonou Agreement	Dominican Republic	Maybe	As of 2018, players in Europe under the Cotonou Agreement are recognised as EU eligible in Denmark, Finland, France, Hungary, Romania, and Spain.
Cotonou Agreement	DR Congo	Maybe	As of 2018, players in Europe under the Cotonou Agreement are recognised as EU eligible in Denmark, Finland, France, Hungary, Romania, and Spain.
Cotonou Agreement	East Timor	Maybe	As of 2018, players in Europe under the Cotonou Agreement are recognised as EU eligible in Denmark, Finland, France, Hungary, Romania, and Spain.
Cotonou Agreement	Equatorial Guinea	Maybe	As of 2018, players in Europe under the Cotonou Agreement are recognised as EU eligible in Denmark, Finland, France, Hungary, Romania, and Spain.
Cotonou Agreement	Eritrea	Maybe	As of 2018, players in Europe under the Cotonou Agreement are recognised as EU eligible in Denmark, Finland, France, Hungary, Romania, and Spain.
Cotonou Agreement	Eswatini	Maybe	As of 2018, players in Europe under the Cotonou Agreement are recognised as EU eligible in Denmark, Finland, France, Hungary, Romania, and Spain.
Cotonou Agreement	Ethiopia	Maybe	As of 2018, players in Europe under the Cotonou Agreement are recognised as EU eligible in Denmark, Finland, France, Hungary, Romania, and Spain.
Cotonou Agreement	Fiji	Maybe	As of 2018, players in Europe under the Cotonou Agreement are recognised as EU eligible in Denmark, Finland, France, Hungary, Romania, and Spain.
Cotonou Agreement	Gabon	Maybe	As of 2018, players in Europe under the Cotonou Agreement are recognised as EU eligible in Denmark, Finland, France, Hungary, Romania, and Spain.
Cotonou Agreement	Gambia	Maybe	As of 2018, players in Europe under the Cotonou Agreement are recognised as EU eligible in Denmark, Finland, France, Hungary, Romania, and Spain.
Cotonou Agreement	Ghana	Maybe	As of 2018, players in Europe under the Cotonou Agreement are recognised as EU eligible in Denmark, Finland, France, Hungary, Romania, and Spain.
Cotonou Agreement	Grenada	Maybe	As of 2018, players in Europe under the Cotonou Agreement are recognised as EU eligible in Denmark, Finland, France, Hungary, Romania, and Spain.
Cotonou Agreement	Guinea	Maybe	As of 2018, players in Europe under the Cotonou Agreement are recognised as EU eligible in Denmark, Finland, France, Hungary, Romania, and Spain.
Cotonou Agreement	Guinea-Bissau	Maybe	As of 2018, players in Europe under the Cotonou Agreement are recognised as EU eligible in Denmark, Finland, France, Hungary, Romania, and Spain.
Cotonou Agreement	Guyana	Maybe	As of 2018, players in Europe under the Cotonou Agreement are recognised as EU eligible in Denmark, Finland, France, Hungary, Romania, and Spain.
Cotonou Agreement	Haiti	Maybe	As of 2018, players in Europe under the Cotonou Agreement are recognised as EU eligible in Denmark, Finland, France, Hungary, Romania, and Spain.
Cotonou Agreement	Ivory Coast	Maybe	As of 2018, players in Europe under the Cotonou Agreement are recognised as EU eligible in Denmark, Finland, France, Hungary, Romania, and Spain.
Cotonou Agreement	Jamaica	Maybe	As of 2018, players in Europe under the Cotonou Agreement are recognised as EU eligible in Denmark, Finland, France, Hungary, Romania, and Spain.
Cotonou Agreement	Kenya	Maybe	As of 2018, players in Europe under the Cotonou Agreement are recognised as EU eligible in Denmark, Finland, France, Hungary, Romania, and Spain.
Cotonou Agreement	Lesotho	Maybe	As of 2018, players in Europe under the Cotonou Agreement are recognised as EU eligible in Denmark, Finland, France, Hungary, Romania, and Spain.
Cotonou Agreement	Liberia	Maybe	As of 2018, players in Europe under the Cotonou Agreement are recognised as EU eligible in Denmark, Finland, France, Hungary, Romania, and Spain.
Cotonou Agreement	Madagascar	Maybe	As of 2018, players in Europe under the Cotonou Agreement are recognised as EU eligible in Denmark, Finland, France, Hungary, Romania, and Spain.
Cotonou Agreement	Malawi	Maybe	As of 2018, players in Europe under the Cotonou Agreement are recognised as EU eligible in Denmark, Finland, France, Hungary, Romania, and Spain.
Cotonou Agreement	Mali	Maybe	As of 2018, players in Europe under the Cotonou Agreement are recognised as EU eligible in Denmark, Finland, France, Hungary, Romania, and Spain.
Cotonou Agreement	Mauritania	Maybe	As of 2018, players in Europe under the Cotonou Agreement are recognised as EU eligible in Denmark, Finland, France, Hungary, Romania, and Spain.
Cotonou Agreement	Mauritius	Maybe	As of 2018, players in Europe under the Cotonou Agreement are recognised as EU eligible in Denmark, Finland, France, Hungary, Romania, and Spain.
Cotonou Agreement	Mozambique	Maybe	As of 2018, players in Europe under the Cotonou Agreement are recognised as EU eligible in Denmark, Finland, France, Hungary, Romania, and Spain.
Cotonou Agreement	Namibia	Maybe	As of 2018, players in Europe under the Cotonou Agreement are recognised as EU eligible in Denmark, Finland, France, Hungary, Romania, and Spain.
Cotonou Agreement	Niger	Maybe	As of 2018, players in Europe under the Cotonou Agreement are recognised as EU eligible in Denmark, Finland, France, Hungary, Romania, and Spain.
Cotonou Agreement	Nigeria	Maybe	As of 2018, players in Europe under the Cotonou Agreement are recognised as EU eligible in Denmark, Finland, France, Hungary, Romania, and Spain.
Cotonou Agreement	Papua New Guinea	Maybe	As of 2018, players in Europe under the Cotonou Agreement are recognised as EU eligible in Denmark, Finland, France, Hungary, Romania, and Spain.
Cotonou Agreement	Rwanda	Maybe	As of 2018, players in Europe under the Cotonou Agreement are recognised as EU eligible in Denmark, Finland, France, Hungary, Romania, and Spain.
Cotonou Agreement	Saint Lucia	Maybe	As of 2018, players in Europe under the Cotonou Agreement are recognised as EU eligible in Denmark, Finland, France, Hungary, Romania, and Spain.
Cotonou Agreement	Saint Kitts and Nevis	Maybe	As of 2018, players in Europe under the Cotonou Agreement are recognised as EU eligible in Denmark, Finland, France, Hungary, Romania, and Spain.
Cotonou Agreement	Saint Vincent and the Grenadines	Maybe	As of 2018, players in Europe under the Cotonou Agreement are recognised as EU eligible in Denmark, Finland, France, Hungary, Romania, and Spain.
Cotonou Agreement	Samoa	Maybe	As of 2018, players in Europe under the Cotonou Agreement are recognised as EU eligible in Denmark, Finland, France, Hungary, Romania, and Spain.
Cotonou Agreement	São Tomé and Príncipe	Maybe	As of 2018, players in Europe under the Cotonou Agreement are recognised as EU eligible in Denmark, Finland, France, Hungary, Romania, and Spain.
Cotonou Agreement	Senegal	Maybe	As of 2018, players in Europe under the Cotonou Agreement are recognised as EU eligible in Denmark, Finland, France, Hungary, Romania, and Spain.
Cotonou Agreement	Seychelles	Maybe	As of 2018, players in Europe under the Cotonou Agreement are recognised as EU eligible in Denmark, Finland, France, Hungary, Romania, and Spain.
Cotonou Agreement	Sierra Leone	Maybe	As of 2018, players in Europe under the Cotonou Agreement are recognised as EU eligible in Denmark, Finland, France, Hungary, Romania, and Spain.
Cotonou Agreement	Solomon Islands	Maybe	As of 2018, players in Europe under the Cotonou Agreement are recognised as EU eligible in Denmark, Finland, France, Hungary, Romania, and Spain.
Cotonou Agreement	Somalia	Maybe	As of 2018, players in Europe under the Cotonou Agreement are recognised as EU eligible in Denmark, Finland, France, Hungary, Romania, and Spain.
Cotonou Agreement	South Africa	Maybe	As of 2018, players in Europe under the Cotonou Agreement are recognised as EU eligible in Denmark, Finland, France, Hungary, Romania, and Spain.
Cotonou Agreement	Sudan	Maybe	As of 2018, players in Europe under the Cotonou Agreement are recognised as EU eligible in Denmark, Finland, France, Hungary, Romania, and Spain.
Cotonou Agreement	Tanzania	Maybe	As of 2018, players in Europe under the Cotonou Agreement are recognised as EU eligible in Denmark, Finland, France, Hungary, Romania, and Spain.
Cotonou Agreement	Togo	Maybe	As of 2018, players in Europe under the Cotonou Agreement are recognised as EU eligible in Denmark, Finland, France, Hungary, Romania, and Spain.
Cotonou Agreement	Tonga	Maybe	As of 2018, players in Europe under the Cotonou Agreement are recognised as EU eligible in Denmark, Finland, France, Hungary, Romania, and Spain.
Cotonou Agreement	Trinidad and Tobago	Maybe	As of 2018, players in Europe under the Cotonou Agreement are recognised as EU eligible in Denmark, Finland, France, Hungary, Romania, and Spain.
Cotonou Agreement	Tuvalu	Maybe	As of 2018, players in Europe under the Cotonou Agreement are recognised as EU eligible in Denmark, Finland, France, Hungary, Romania, and Spain.
Cotonou Agreement	Uganda	Maybe	As of 2018, players in Europe under the Cotonou Agreement are recognised as EU eligible in Denmark, Finland, France, Hungary, Romania, and Spain.
Cotonou Agreement	Vanuatu	Maybe	As of 2018, players in Europe under the Cotonou Agreement are recognised as EU eligible in Denmark, Finland, France, Hungary, Romania, and Spain.
Cotonou Agreement	Zambia	Maybe	As of 2018, players in Europe under the Cotonou Agreement are recognised as EU eligible in Denmark, Finland, France, Hungary, Romania, and Spain.
Cotonou Agreement	Zanzibar	Maybe	As of 2018, players in Europe under the Cotonou Agreement are recognised as EU eligible in Denmark, Finland, France, Hungary, Romania, and Spain.
Cotonou Agreement	Zimbabwe	Maybe	As of 2018, players in Europe under the Cotonou Agreement are recognised as EU eligible in Denmark, Finland, France, Hungary, Romania, and Spain.
Euro-Mediterranean agreement	Algeria	Maybe	As of 2018, Algerian, Moroccan and Tunisian players are recognised as EU eligible in Finland, Greece, and Spain.
Euro-Mediterranean agreement	Morocco	Maybe	As of 2018, Algerian, Moroccan and Tunisian players are recognised as EU eligible in Finland, Greece, and Spain.
Euro-Mediterranean agreement	Tunisia	Maybe	As of 2018, Algerian, Moroccan and Tunisian players are recognised as EU eligible in Finland, Greece, and Spain.
Euro-Mediterranean agreement	Israel	Maybe	As of 2018, Israelis are recognised as EU eligible in Germany and Hungary.
SAA	Albania	Maybe	As of 2018, Albanian, Bosnian-Herzegovinian and Serbian players are recognised as EU eligible in Greece and Spain.
SAA	Bosnia and Herzegovina	Maybe	As of 2018, Albanian, Bosnian-Herzegovinian and Serbian players are recognised as EU eligible in Greece and Spain.
SAA	Serbia	Maybe	As of 2018, Albanian, Bosnian-Herzegovinian and Serbian players are recognised as EU eligible in Greece and Spain.
SAA	North Macedonia	Maybe	As of 2018, Macedonians are recognised as EU eligible in Hungary and Spain.
DCFTA	Georgia	Maybe	As of 2018, Georgians, Moldovans and Ukrainians are recognised as EU eligible in Hungary and Spain.
DCFTA	Moldova	Maybe	As of 2018, Georgians, Moldovans and Ukrainians are recognised as EU eligible in Hungary and Spain.
DCFTA	Ukraine	Maybe	As of 2018, Georgians, Moldovans and Ukrainians are recognised as EU eligible in Hungary and Spain.
	Russia	Maybe	As of 2018, Russian and Turkish players are recognised as EU eligible in Greece, Hungary and Spain.
	Turkiye	Maybe	As of 2018, Russian and Turkish players are recognised as EU eligible in Greece, Hungary and Spain.
	Kazakhstan	Maybe	As of 2018, Kazakh players are recognised as EU eligible in Hungary.
	Kyrgyzstan	Maybe	As of 2018, the French Football Federation recognises Kyrgyz and Uzbek citizens as EU eligible.
	Uzbekistan	Maybe	As of 2018, the French Football Federation recognises Kyrgyz and Uzbek citizens as EU eligible.

== National league restrictions ==
Various European leagues maintain rules related to EU status: as of 2008, Swedish teams may only have three non-EU players on the pitch, and German lower divisions could only have three non-EU players. The same year, clubs in Belarus' first division could register four non-EU players and have three on the pitch, while there were no restrictions in its second division. Conversely, clubs in Bulgaria's second division could not have any non-EU players; in its first division they could register five non-EU players and all could play. Italy's third division did not allow non-EU players, while its second division clubs could sign one and in the first division they could have five. Spain's third division did not allow non-EU players except those already registered in teams that were relegated; first division teams could have three players and second division teams could have two.

In Finland, Iceland and the Czech Republic, there were no registration limits for professional non-EU players, but a club could only field three. Ukraine had no registration limits; its first division clubs could field seven non-EU players and its second division clubs could field three. In Slovakia and Croatia they could field four; Denmark could field only three, but treated Cotonou players as EU players. French first division clubs could sign four non-EU players, while its second and third divisions were limited to two; Romanian, Swiss, Israeli and Greek first division teams could have five non-EU players, and in their second divisions they could have three. Similarly, in Hungary clubs had no registration limits but first division teams could field five non-EU players, with second division teams able to play three. Russian clubs had no registration limits, with its first division teams able to field seven non-EU players, and the second division could field three. Turkish first division clubs could sign eight foreign players and field six, while its second division could only sign two foreign players under the age of 21. Norway allowed up to eleven non-Norwegian players of any origin, providing the club had at least two homegrown players in its remaining squad. In 2008, the Netherlands, Serbia, Poland, Portugal, the Republic of Ireland, Northern Ireland, Wales, Scotland and England had no restrictions on non-EU players. Following Brexit, all non-British players must meet requirements of a points-based system to play in British leagues.

== See also ==
- Non-EU players in Serie A
- EU eligibility in La Liga
- Homegrown Player Rule (UEFA)
- 6+5 rule
