= Mendizorrotza Stadium =

Football stadium in Vitoria-Gasteiz, Spain

Campo de Fútbol de Mendizorrotza
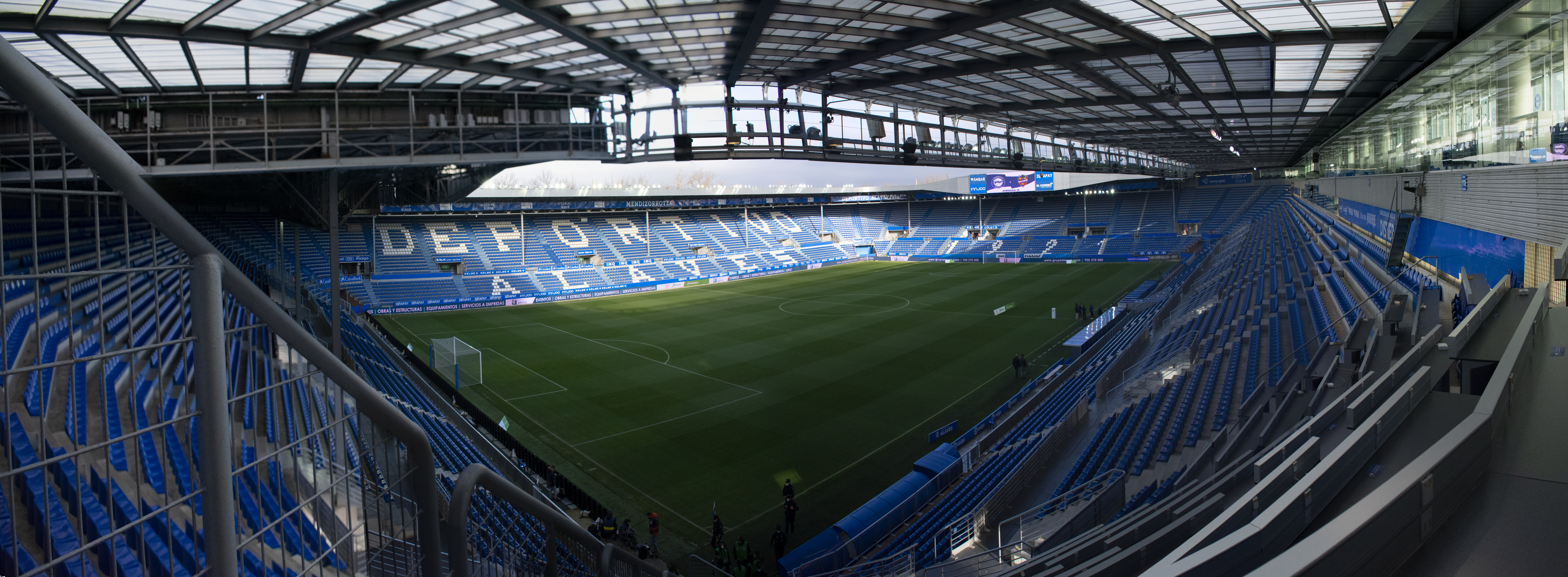
- Interactive map of Campo de Fútbol de Mendizorrotza
- Location: Vitoria-Gasteiz, Spain
- Coordinates: 42°50′14″N 2°41′17″W
- Owner: Ayuntamiento de Vitoria-Gasteiz
- Operator: Deportivo Alavés
- Capacity: 19,840
- Surface: Grass
- Field size: 105 x 68 m

Construction
- Opened: 27 April 1924
- Expanded: 1998

Tenant
- Deportivo Alavés

Campo de Fútbol de Mendizorrotza is a football stadium in Vitoria-Gasteiz, in the province of Álava, Basque Country, Spain. With a capacity of 19,840, the stadium is the home ground of Deportivo Alavés.

== History ==
Opened on 27 April 1924, just one day before of Saint Prudence's Day (the day of the patron of Alava), it is currently the third oldest football stadium in the Spanish Professional Football, behind El Molinón and Mestalla. The first match to happen at the stadium was between Deportivo Alavés and Union Deportiva Deusto and the first player to score was Pérez Muga.

During its history, the stadium had several renovations. The most important one was the expansion made in 1998, making new stands in the corners for increasing the capacity of the stadium to the current 19,840 seats.

The stadium hosted 2 games of Basque Country national team, one in 1980 against Hungary with a 5-1 victory for Basque Country, and one in 2018 against Venezuela that also finished with a victory with a final score 4-2.

In December 2016, the club president Josean Querejeta announced a plan of modernisation and expansion of the stadium, possibly bringing its capacity to 28,000. Due to the economic problems caused by the COVID-19 pandemic in Spain, in June 2020 the club confirmed the project would be delayed for at least a year.

== Gallery ==
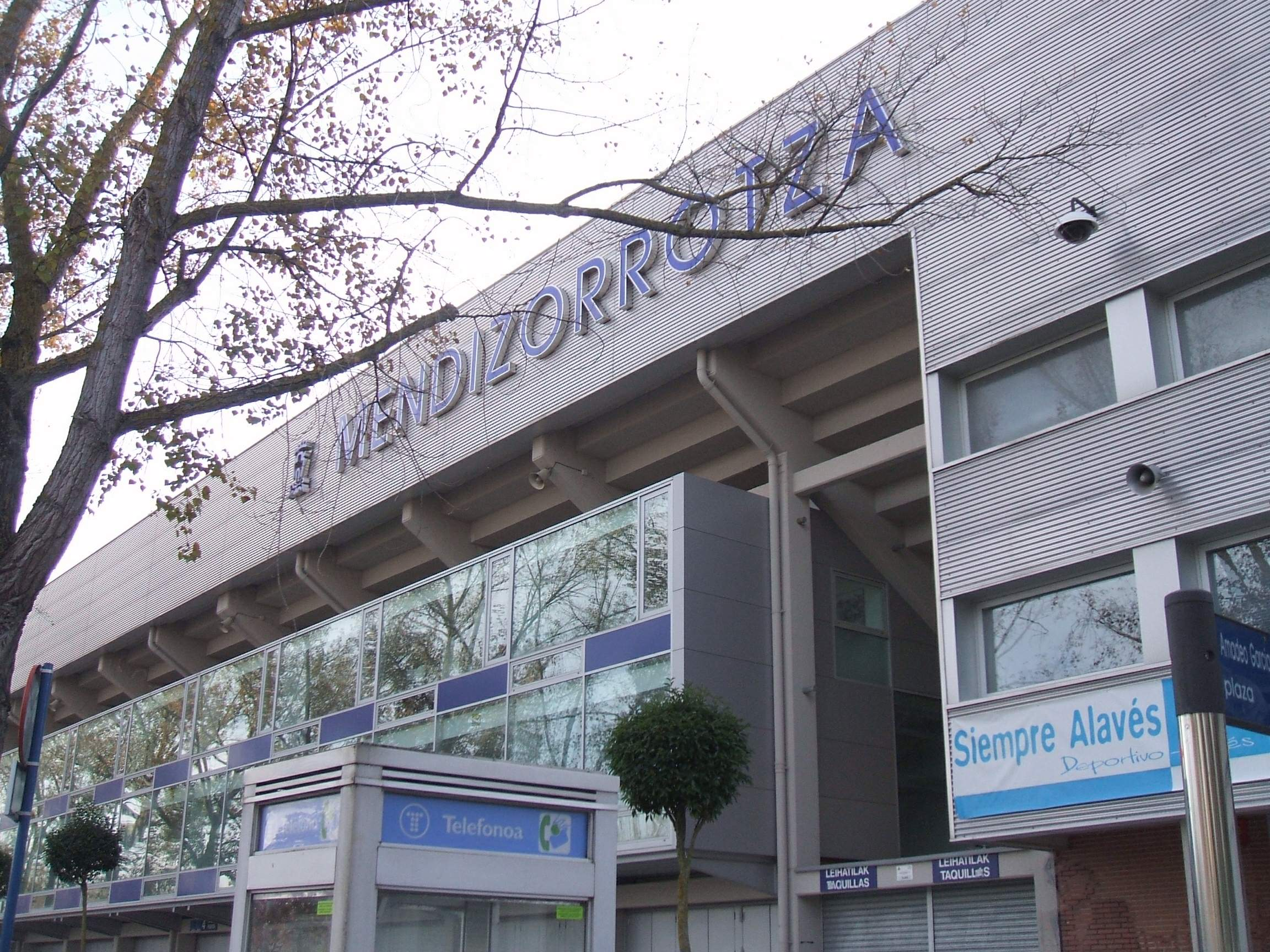
Exterior of the main stand

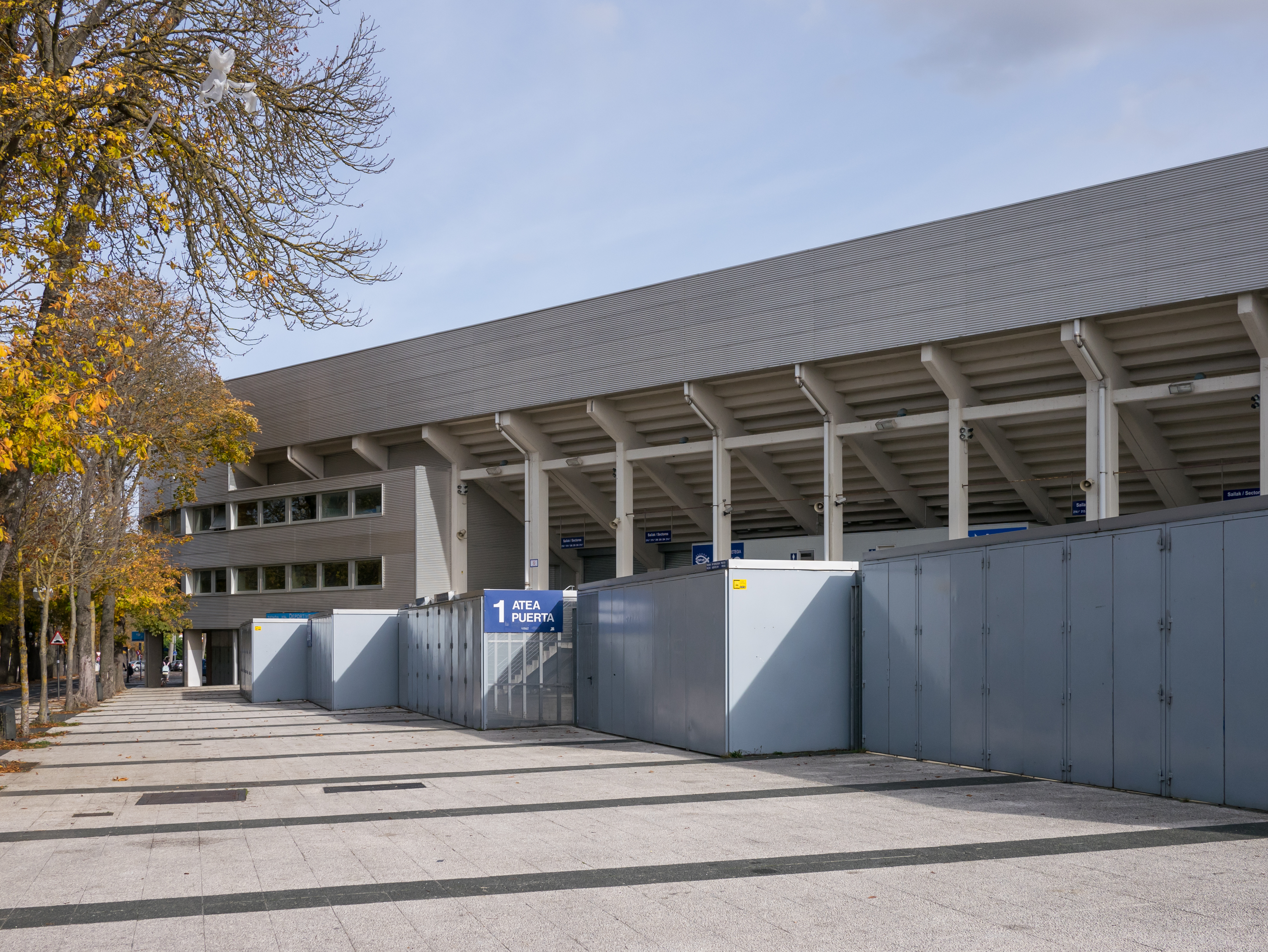
Exterior of the stadium

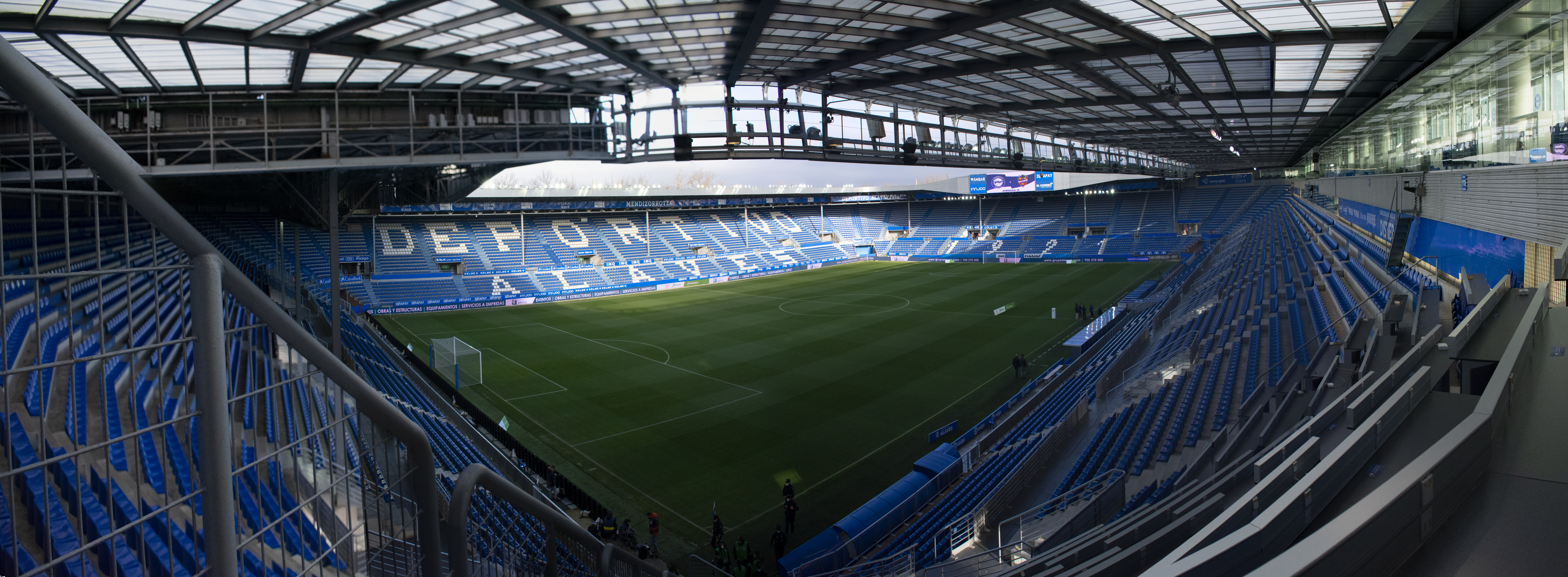
Interior in 2021

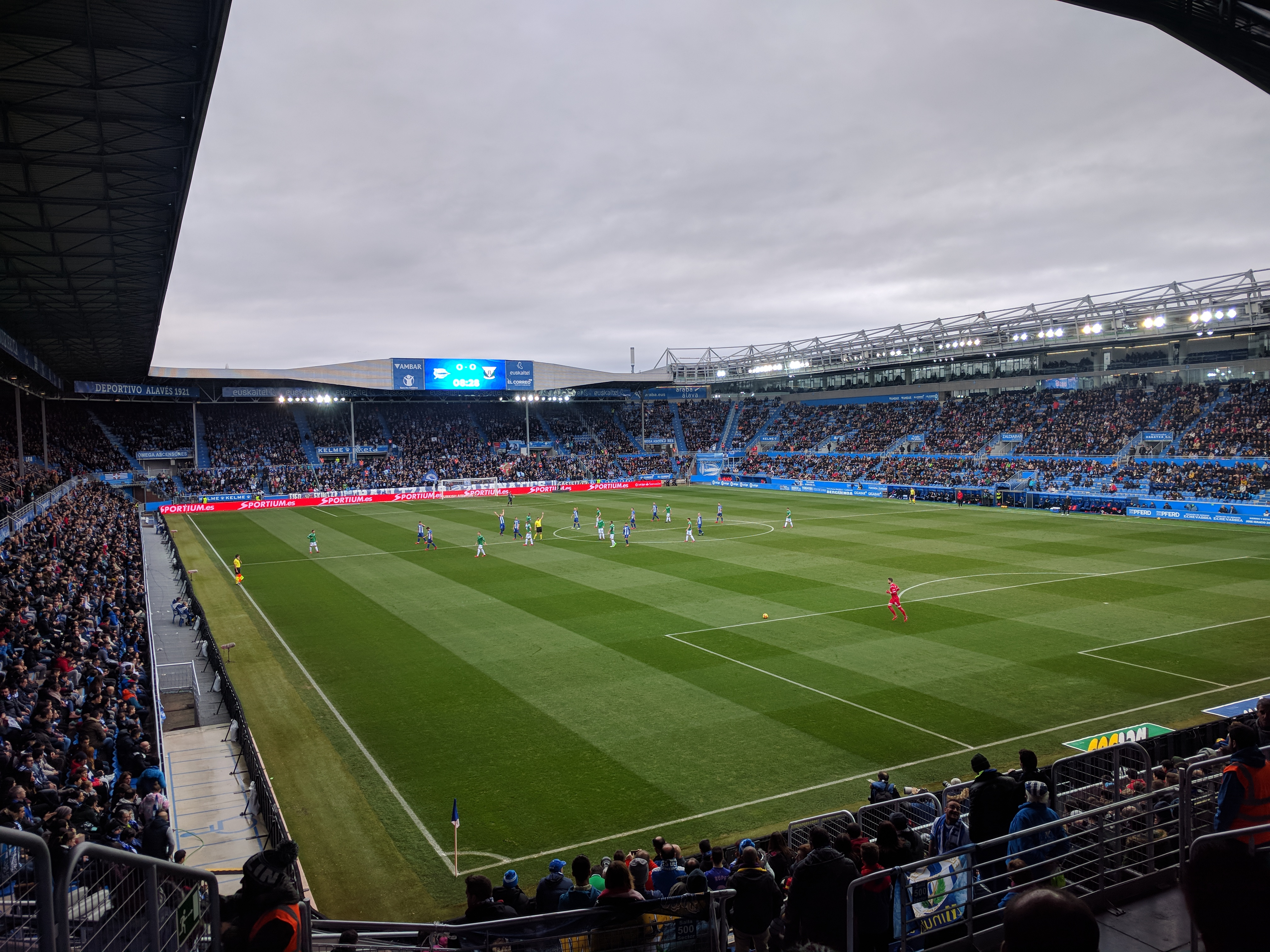
The stadium in 2017

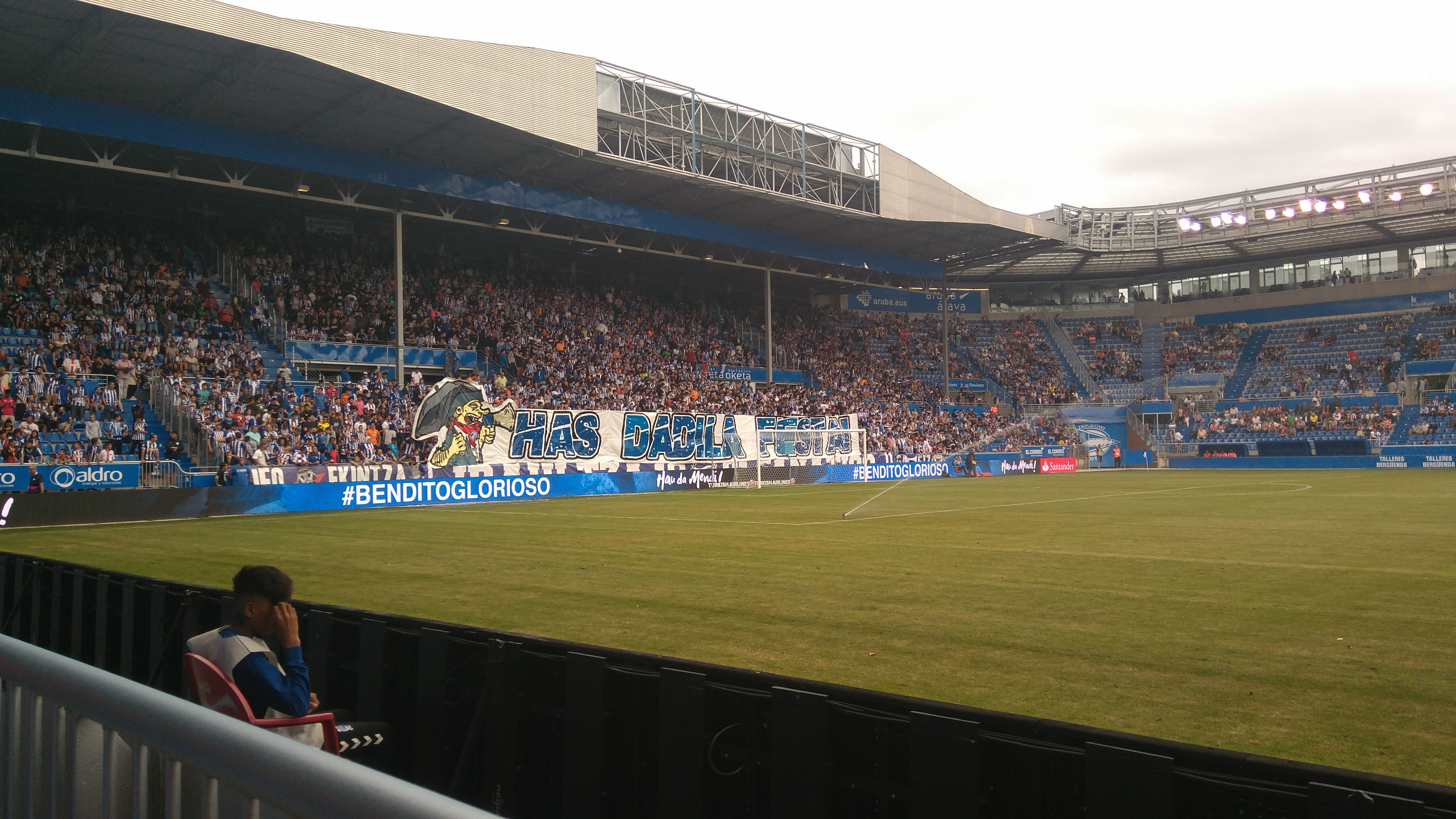
Interior of the stadium
