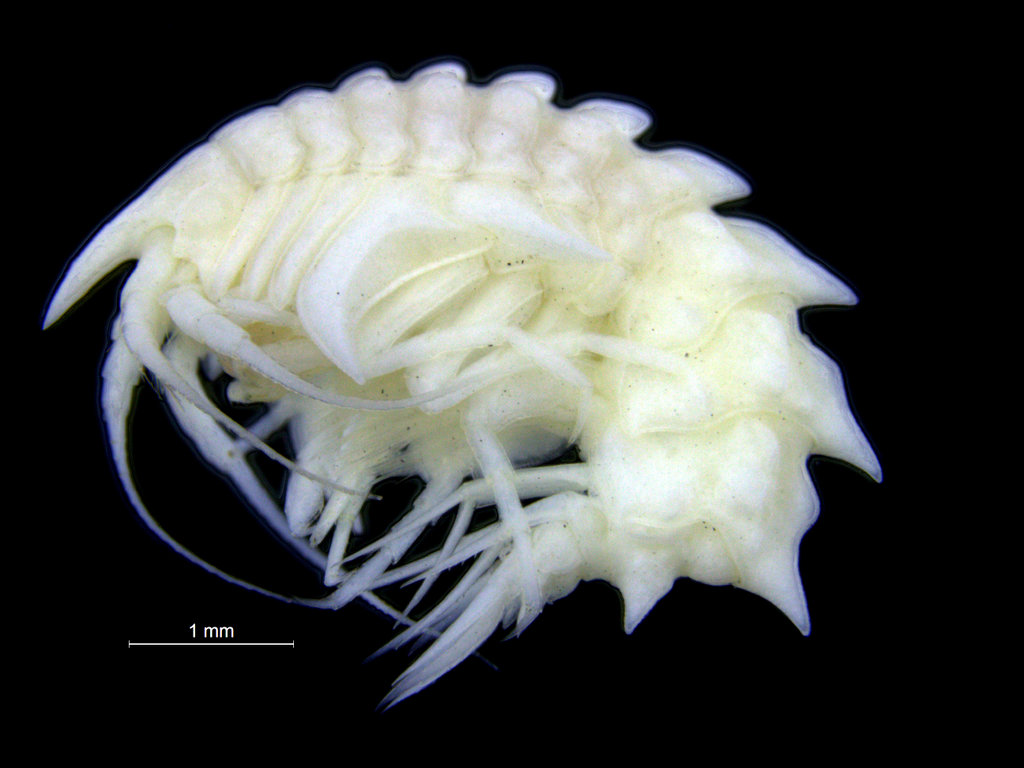

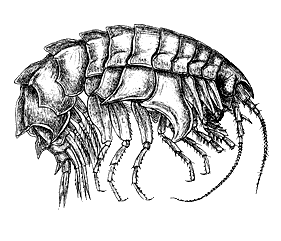
- Epimeria cornigera (above), Epimeria parasitica (below). Both are reddish in life

Scientific classification
- Kingdom: Animalia
- Phylum: Arthropoda
- Clade: Pancrustacea
- Class: Malacostraca
- Order: Amphipoda
- Parvorder: Amphilochidira
- Superfamily: Iphimedioidea
- Family: Epimeriidae; Boeck, 1871

Genera
- 2, see text

= Epimeriidae =

Family of crustaceans

Epimeriidae is a family of relatively large amphipods found in cold oceans around the world.

== Distribution, habitat and abundance ==
Members of this family range from the intertidal zone to a depth of 5,695 m (18,684 ft), but overall mostly 150–2,500 m (490–8,200 ft) and in the Southern Ocean mostly 100–700 m (330–2,300 ft). The highest species richness is in the Southern Ocean south of the Antarctic Convergence, followed by deep parts of the Pacific Ocean, with only a few elsewhere, including the Magellanic region, Indian Ocean, Atlantic Ocean (both north and south) and Mediterranean Sea. In tropical and warm-temperate regions they only occur in deep, cold waters. The vast majority are generally slow-moving and benthic, but can move fast for short distance and a few species are pelagic or semi-pelagic.

The family includes both species that are widespread and species with small ranges (typically restricted to an island, seamount or ridge), and very common species and rare species. Their abundance is often directly related to the epifauna abundance: Where the epifauna is rich and diverse, so are Epimeriidae.

A few species have been kept, bred and studied in cold-water (−1 to 1.5 °C or 30.2 to 34.7 °F) aquariums by scientists.

== Appearance and behavior ==
They are relatively large amphipods, with adults of the various species ranging from 0.8 to 8 cm (0.3–3.1 in) in head-and-body length. They are typically white, yellowish, orange, pinkish, red or purplish, and some have quite striking colour patterns. Some have a spiny crest along their mid-back and spines on their sides, which may serve as a protection against fish or serve as a "disruptive shape" (similar to disruptive colouration) that camouflages the amphipod.

Most species are predators or scavengers that feed on benthic invertebrates (such as small crustaceans, brittle stars, sea cucumbers, sponges, cnidarians and polychaetes), or suspension feeders that take plankton (such as diatoms, radiolarians and foraminifers). Some are opportunistic feeders that will take a wide range of prey-types, while other species are specialists on one or a few prey types, like hydroids. Epimeria parasitica is a parasite on sea cucumbers.

The newly hatched young resemble miniature versions of the adults (there is no larvae stage). They may climb onto their mother and stay with her for a period, but in other species they leave immediately.

== Taxonomy and genera ==
Two genera are placed in this family by the World Register of Marine Species. A few others were formerly included, but are now regarded as subgenera (not full genera) or placed in other families (Actinacanthus in family Acanthonotozomellidae and Paramphithoe in family Paramphithoidae).

- Epimeria Costa, 1851
- Uschakoviella Gurjanova, 1955

With more than 80 described species, Epimeria is by far the most diverse genus in the family, has been the target of several studies and is considered among the most iconic taxa in Southern Ocean. Nevertheless, many aspects of their life is poorly known, several new species have been described in the last decade and it is likely that several undescribed species remain. There is only a single species in the genus Uschakoviella.
