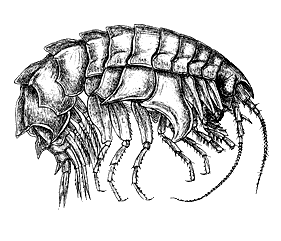
- Epimera parasitica

Scientific classification
- Domain: Eukaryota
- Kingdom: Animalia
- Phylum: Arthropoda
- Class: Malacostraca
- Order: Amphipoda
- Family: Epimeriidae
- Genus: Epimeria; Costa, 1851

= Epimeria =

Genus of crustaceans

Epimeria is a genus of amphipods in the family Epimeriidae. There are more than 80 described species in Epimeria.

== Species ==
These 85 species belong to the genus Epimeria:

- Epimeria abyssalis Shimomura & Tomikawa, 2016
- Epimeria acanthochelon dAcoz & Verheye, 2017
- Epimeria acanthurus (Schellenberg, 1931)
- Epimeria adeliae dAcoz & Verheye, 2017
- Epimeria amoenitas dAcoz & Verheye, 2017
- Epimeria angelikae (Lörz & Linse, 2011)
- Epimeria anguloce dAcoz & Verheye, 2017
- Epimeria annabellae Coleman, 1994
- Epimeria anodon dAcoz & Verheye, 2017
- Epimeria ashleyi (Lörz, 2012)
- Epimeria atalanta D'Udekem D'Acoz & Verheye, 2017
- Epimeria bathyalis Wakabara & Serejo, 1999
- Epimeria bispinosa Ledoyer, 1986
- Epimeria bruuni J.L.Barnard, 1961
- Epimeria callista dAcoz & Verheye, 2017
- Epimeria cinderella dAcoz & Verheye, 2017
- Epimeria cleo Verheye, Lörz & dAcoz, 2018
- Epimeria colemani dAcoz & Verheye, 2017
- Epimeria concordia Griffiths, 1977
- Epimeria cora J. L. Barnard, 1971
- Epimeria corbariae dAcoz & Verheye, 2017
- Epimeria cornigera (Fabricius, 1779)
- Epimeria cyphorachis dAcoz & Verheye, 2017
- Epimeria cyrano dAcoz & Verheye, 2017
- Epimeria debroyeri dAcoz & Verheye, 2017
- Epimeria emma Lörz & Coleman, 2014
- Epimeria extensa Andres, 1985
- Epimeria frankei Beermann & Raupach, 2018
- Epimeria gargantua dAcoz & Verheye, 2017
- Epimeria geodesiae (Bellan-Santini, 1972)
- Epimeria georgiana (Schellenberg, 1931)
- Epimeria glaucosa J.L.Barnard, 1961
- Epimeria grandirostris (Chevreux, 1912)
- Epimeria havermansiana dAcoz & Verheye, 2017
- Epimeria heldi (Coleman, 1998)
- Epimeria horsti Lörz, 2008
- Epimeria inermis (Walker, 1903)
- Epimeria intermedia (Schellenberg, 1931)
- Epimeria iota dAcoz & Verheye, 2017
- Epimeria kharieis dAcoz & Verheye, 2017
- Epimeria larsi (Lörz, 2009)
- Epimeria leukhoplites dAcoz & Verheye, 2017
- Epimeria linseae dAcoz & Verheye, 2017
- Epimeria loerzae dAcoz & Verheye, 2017
- Epimeria longispinosa K. H. Barnard, 1916
- Epimeria loricata G. O. Sars, 1879
- Epimeria macrodonta (Walker, 1906)
- Epimeria monodon Stephensen, 1947
- Epimeria morronei Winfield, Ortiz & Hendrickx, 2012
- Epimeria norfanzi Lörz, 2011
- Epimeria obtusa Watling, 1981
- Epimeria ortizi Varela & García-Gómez, 2015
- Epimeria oxicarinata (Coleman, 1990)
- Epimeria pacifica Gurjanova, 1955
- Epimeria pandora dAcoz & Verheye, 2017
- Epimeria parasitica (M.Sars, 1858)
- Epimeria pelagica Birstein & M.Vinogradov, 1958
- Epimeria pulchra (Coleman, 1990)
- Epimeria puncticulata K.H.Barnard, 1930
- Epimeria pyrodrakon dAcoz & Verheye, 2017
- Epimeria quasimodo dAcoz & Verheye, 2017
- Epimeria rafaeli Coleman & Lowry, 2014
- Epimeria reoproi (Lörz & Coleman, 2001)
- Epimeria rimicarinata (Watling & Holman, 1980)
- Epimeria robertiana dAcoz & Verheye, 2017
- Epimeria robusta (K.H.Barnard, 1930)
- Epimeria robustoides Lörz & Coleman, 2009
- Epimeria rotunda Wakabara & Serejo, 1999
- Epimeria rubrieques (De Broyer & Klages, 1991)
- Epimeria scabrosa (K.H.Barnard, 1930)
- Epimeria schiaparelli (Lörz, Maas, Linse & Fenwick, 2007)
- Epimeria semiarmata K.H.Barnard, 1916
- Epimeria similis (Chevreux, 1912)
- Epimeria sophie Lörz & Coleman, 2014
- Epimeria subcarinata Nagata, 1963
- Epimeria teres dAcoz & Verheye, 2017
- Epimeria truncata (Andres, 1985)
- Epimeria tuberculata G. O. Sars, 1893
- Epimeria ultraspinosa Wakabara & Serejo, 1999
- Epimeria urvillei dAcoz & Verheye, 2017
- Epimeria vaderi (Coleman, 1998)
- Epimeria victoria (Hurley, 1957)
- Epimeria walkeri (K.H.Barnard, 1930)
- Epimeria xesta dAcoz & Verheye, 2017
- Epimeria yaquinae McCain, 1971
