= Lucky Strike (disambiguation) =

Lucky Strike is a brand of American cigarettes.

Lucky Strike may also refer to:

== Entertainment and media ==
- "Lucky Strike" (song), by Maroon 5, 2012
- Lucky Strike (2026 film), an American film directed by Rod Lurie
- "Lucky Strike" (CSI), an episode of the television show CSI
- A Lucky Strike, a 1915 film featuring Oliver Hardy
- Lucky Strikes (album), a 1964 album by jazz saxophonist Lucky Thompson
- "Lucky Strike", an episode of the TV show 90210
- "Lucky Strike", an episode of the British sitcom Oh, Doctor Beeching!
- "Lucky Strike", a 2018 song by the singer Troye Sivan from his album Bloom
- The Lucky Strike, a World War II alternate history novella by Kim Stanley Robinson

== Places ==
- Lucky Strike, Alberta, a town in Canada
- Lucky Strike, Belize, a village located in the Belize District
- Lucky Strike, in the Mid Atlantic Ridge, where Luckia striki was discovered

== Other uses ==
- Lucky Strike Lanes, a chain of bowling lanes
- Lucky Strike Entertainment Corporation, formerly Bowlero, which acquired Lucky Strike Lanes in 2023
- Camp Lucky Strike, a World War II rehabilitation camp; see Stalag Luft I
