= Uschakoviella =

Scientific classification
- Domain: Eukaryota
- Kingdom: Animalia
- Phylum: Arthropoda
- Class: Malacostraca
- Order: Amphipoda
- Family: Epimeriidae
- Genus: Uschakoviella; Gurjanova, 1955
- Species: U. echinophora

Binomial name
- Uschakoviella echinophora Gurjanova, 1955

Genus of crustaceans

Uschakoviella is a genus of amphipods in the family Epimeriidae. There is one described species in Uschakoviella, U. echinophora.
