= Pontogeneia =

Pontogeneia may refer to:

- Pontogeneia (fungus), a genus in the Sordariomycetes
- Pontogeneia (crustacean), a genus in the Amphipoda
