= Schraderia mardeni =

Scientific classification
- Domain: Eukaryota
- Kingdom: Animalia
- Phylum: Arthropoda
- Class: Malacostraca
- Order: Amphipoda
- Family: Pontogeneiidae
- Genus: Schraderia
- Species: S. mardeni

Binomial name
- Schraderia mardeni (T. E. Bowman, 1974)

Species of crustacean

Schraderia mardeni is a species of amphipod in the family Pontogeneiidae. It was originally described as Dolobrotus mardeni, and was the only species in the genus Dolobrotus, but that genus is now considered a synonym of Schraderia. Discovered by Luis Marden, after whom it is named, Schraderia mardeni is a deep-water Atlantic lobster-bait scavenger or parasite.
