= Javier Tebas =

Spanish lawyer (born 1962)

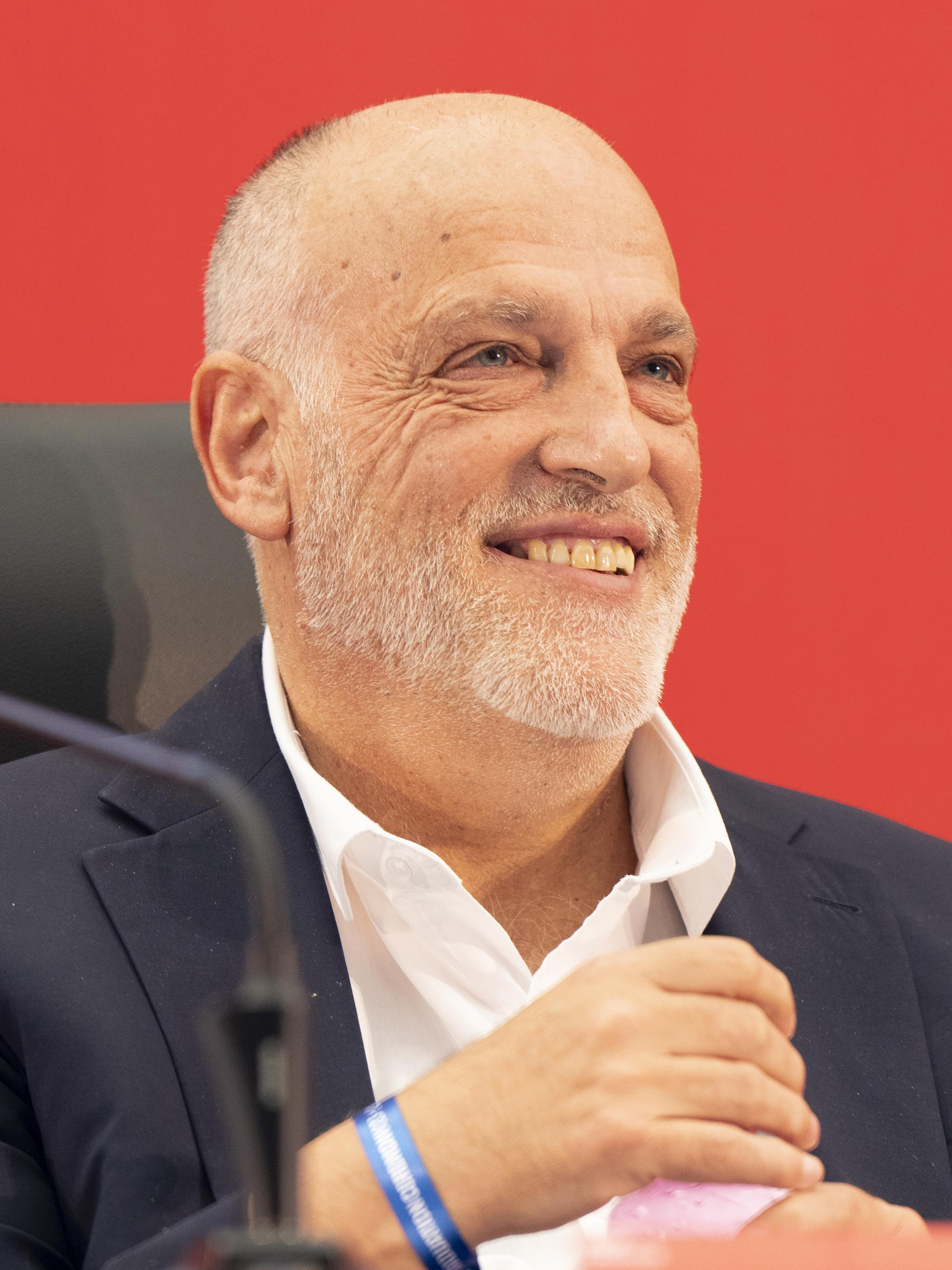
- Tebas in 2024

President of Liga Nacional de Fútbol Profesional
- Incumbent
- Assumed office 26 April 2013
- Preceded by: José Luis Astiazarán

Personal details
- Born: Xavier Tebas Medrano; 31 July 1962 (age 64) San José, Costa Rica
- Education: University of Zaragoza

Xavier Tebas Medrano, better known as Javier Tebas (Spanish pronunciation: [xaˈβjeɾ ˈteβas]; born 31 July 1962), is a Spanish lawyer and the president of Liga Nacional de Fútbol Profesional, the association responsible for administering Spain's two highest-tier professional football leagues. First elected in April 2013, he was re-elected for a fourth term in December 2023 until 2027. Tebas has promised that this will be his last term, ending in 2027. He is a supporter of the far-right Spanish Vox party.

== Biography ==
=== Early life ===
Born in Costa Rica, Tebas moved to Spain with his family at the age of 4. He came from a Catholic family in Huesca: his father was a soldier and his mother, a psychologist and pedagogue, Gloria Medrano Mir, was a professor at the University of Zaragoza. During La Vanguardia's Forum "Defense of the European Football Ecosystem" in March 2023, when asked by the moderator of the debate to Javier Tebas if his real and official name is "Xavier" in Catalan, Tebas answered yes. He said that his whole family called him Xavi and that at school they also called him "Xavi".

Tebas studied law at the University of Zaragoza. During his student days, he was a provincial delegate of the Fuerza Nueva, a far-right Spanish party founded during the final years of Francisco Franco's regime. In January 2019, Tebas publicly stated his support for the Vox party, which is generally described as right-wing or far-right by various analysts. Tebas has recently been involved in a major controversy for comparing Real Madrid's communication methods to those of Nazi propaganda minister Joseph Goebbels.

== Career ==
His expertise in business, sports and bankruptcy law was decisive in advising and representing numerous football clubs throughout his career and in creating a law firm specializing in the world of sport. Tebas has worked for eleven La Liga clubs, with his first role being president of SD Huesca in 1993. He served three terms as the vice-president of Liga Nacional de Fútbol Profesional, being elected for the first time in 2001, and also worked for the G30 group of clubs, where he helped the clubs negotiate their television deals.

=== President of La Liga ===
In 2013, Tebas was appointed the president of La Liga after an uncontested election in which he was supported by 32 of the 42 La Liga and Segunda División clubs. Prior to the election, Tebas had promised to clean up the Spanish game after match-fixing allegations, and also to make match tickets affordable.

The arrival of Javier Tebas as president introduced multiple reforms to La Liga, particularly in financial restructuring and broadcasting rights. Among the key initiatives to have been introduced since he took the role of vice president (and later president) are: economic restructuring of the clubs and financing of La Liga, achieved by the centralised sale of television broadcasting rights; tough measures against match-fixing; establishing policies to tackle violence or abuse in the stadiums; and digitalization and multimedia development that allows fans to interact with the clubs across multiple channels.

Regarding the centralized sale of television rights, this was a process that was achieved following the formation of the G-30, a group of clubs that united for the sale of their television rights, of which Javier Tebas was one of the main promoters. Since 2003, Tebas has taken a stance in favor of the centralized sale of television rights through La Liga. Under Tebas' leadership, revenue distribution among clubs became more balanced, with smaller clubs reportedly receiving a larger share of TV rights income than before.

Another of his achievements within La Liga has been the financial restructuring of the clubs. The large amounts of debt the football clubs had, led to the members themselves, the clubs, to self-impose strict economic and financial control measures that would be applied by La Liga. For this task, Tebas called upon Javier Gomez, former vice president of Valencia, appointing him as his second in command and managing director with the responsibility of enforcing the new internal regulations.

Following the implementation of economic control from 2013 onwards, La Liga reported that during the first four years of Tebas's tenure, debts to the treasury were reduced by 71% (from €647 million to €184 million) and total revenues increased by 48% (from €2.236 million to €3.327 million) in June 2017. In this regard, former football player and coach Jorge Valdano said of him:

Although we differ ideologically, I will say that Tebas did more for Spanish football than all his critics combined. Whatever his future holds, he won't go backwards, because his style is to be on front line. Since his arrival, LaLiga has become richer, more democratic in its distribution of money, more rigorous with its contracts, more professional in how it stages matches and more respectful of its sense of identity. No one did more or risked more to make sure LaLiga could reach these ends.

The centralized management of audiovisual rights led to revenue growth for La Liga clubs, with reports indicating an X% increase in broadcasting income over X years. In order to increase its television audience, match schedules were adapted so that the games did not coincide with each other and could each have a distinct kick-off time; these measures were applauded internationally but drew criticism among Spanish viewers. At the Business Football Summit in February 2026, he sharply criticized Nasser Al-Khelaïfi and the financial management of Paris Saint-Germain, alleging a lack of transparency and calling for harmonized European regulation of club finances.

== Controversies ==
During his tenure, Tebas has said that Spanish league matches could be held outside of Spain in places such as the United States, following the path of leagues such as the US-based National Football League, National Basketball Association, Major League Baseball, and National Hockey League in playing regular season matches abroad. The plans are to hold one match per season outside of Spain, and Tebas has said that El Clásico would not be one of the matches selected. La Liga's attempts to organize and hold a match in Miami have so far been stopped by the Spanish Football Federation (RFEF), who are against it. The La Liga match in Miami due to take place on December 20, 2025 was cancelled on October 22, 2025 after backlash from players and several La Liga clubs. He has also said that if the Catalonia region became independent from Spain, then its football teams, including Barcelona and Espanyol, would not be allowed to compete in the Spanish football leagues.

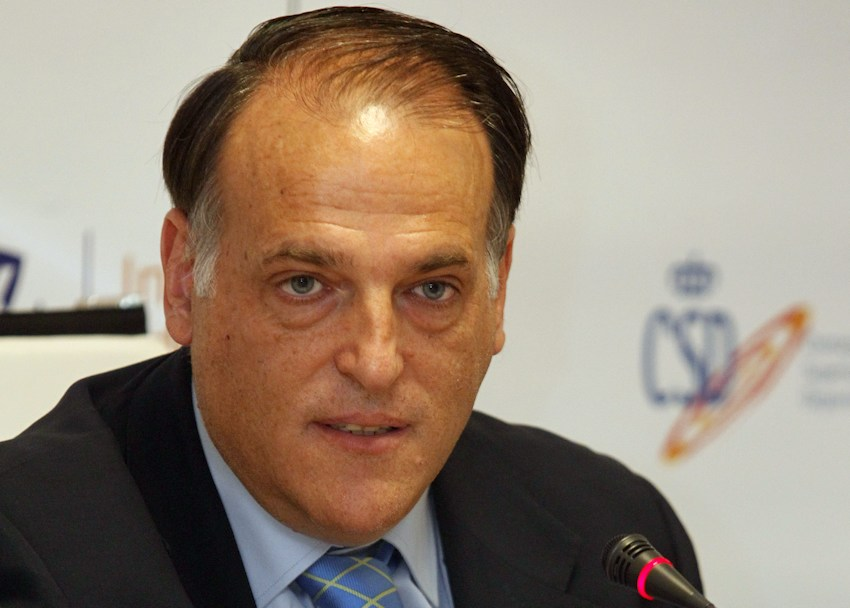
Tebas in 2013

According to Le Monde, Tebas is "often at the forefront of clashes with global football authorities". He was critical of former UEFA acting president Ángel María Villar, who also headed the Royal Spanish Football Federation for many years. In 2017, Villar was arrested and jailed on corruption charges. Tebas has also been critical of FIFA, saying that they need an overhaul of personnel in order to regain the trust of the footballing community. Tebas has publicly criticized FIFA, alleging that it was responsible for contract information leaks from the Football Leaks website.

Tebas has opposed the European Super League, arguing that it would disproportionately benefit larger clubs while reducing opportunities for smaller teams. His reasoning is that these proposals would mean the end of football "as we know it today" and would be very harmful to national leagues and clubs, as well as fans, who could see their local clubs disappear. Tebas also argues that the plans would be damaging to the big clubs and organizers of these proposed 'superleagues'. Tebas argues that, in his view, such plans could risk reducing fan engagement and club revenues over time.

The European Super League debate has been ongoing in the football industry since 2019. In May 2019, all of the national leagues in Europe met in Madrid, at an event coordinated by La Liga, to express their disapproval of any such plans. Tebas has been an outspoken opponent of state-backed football club funding, often referring to it as 'financial doping'. He has stated that state-run football clubs, such as Manchester City and Paris Saint-Germain, are a "danger" to the sport.

On 21 May 2023, Real Madrid striker Vinicius Jr stated that Spain was seen as "a nation of racists" in Brazil after being racially abused by Valencia fans earlier that day. Tebas responded by claiming that Vinicius did not turn up for meetings to discuss what La Liga "can do in cases of racism", adding: "Before you criticise and slander La Liga, you need to inform yourself properly." Tebas has also been critical of the expanded FIFA Club World Cup, stating that it breaks the flow of the club schedule, the matches are more like friendlies, and that it would continue financial imbalance between clubs. He has stated that he would like to see the tournament revert to its old format. In July 2026, he publicly called for Gianni Infantino's resignation, accusing him of "destroying the football industry" through the continual expansion of international tournaments at the expense of domestic leagues. In October 2026, calls were made for Tebas to resign by Real Madrid after he made comments comparing the club's media strategy to Nazi propaganda minister Joseph Goebbels.
