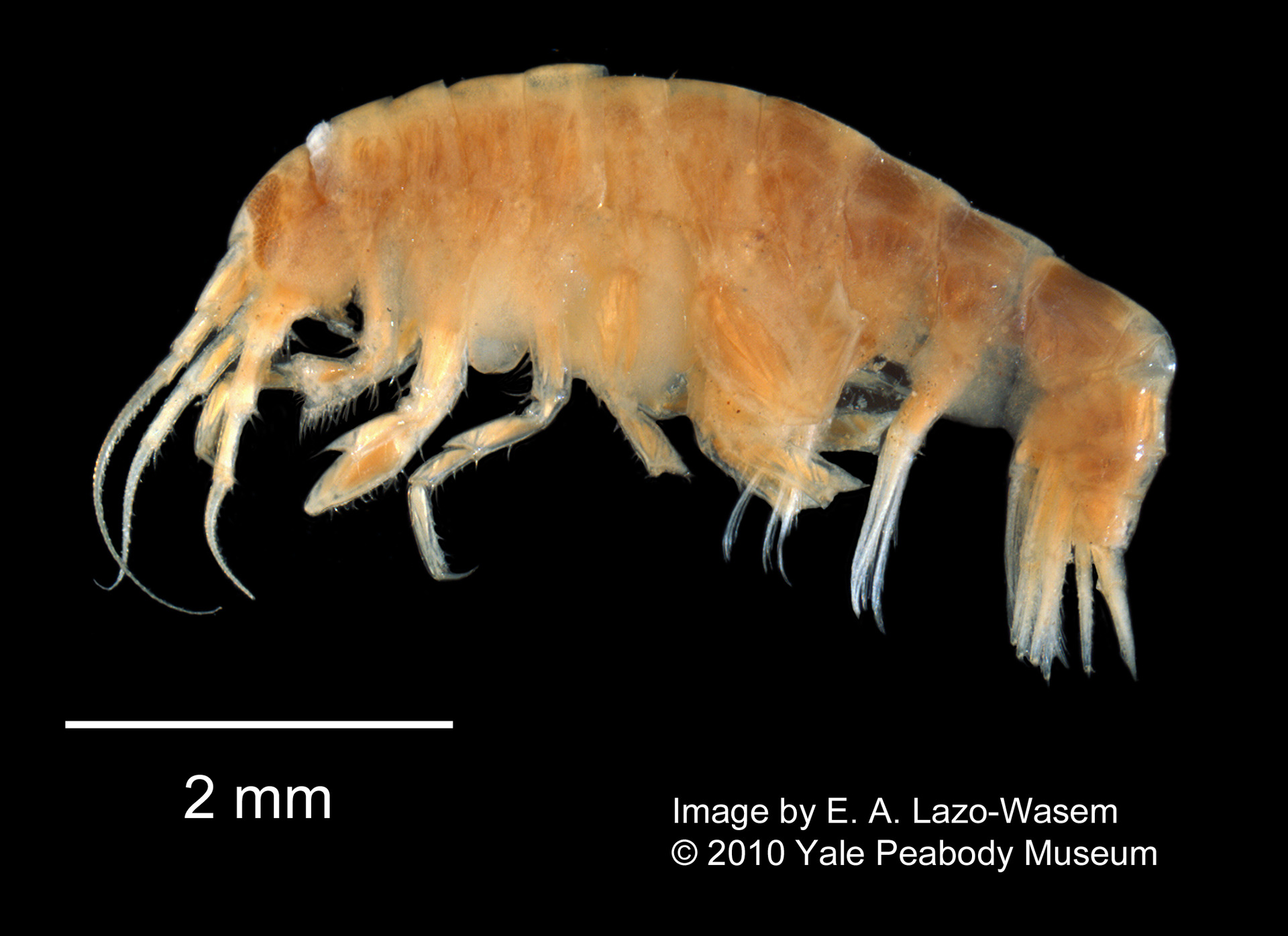
- Pontogeneia verrilli

Scientific classification
- Kingdom: Animalia
- Phylum: Arthropoda
- Clade: Pancrustacea
- Class: Malacostraca
- Order: Amphipoda
- Family: Pontogeneiidae
- Genus: Pontogeneia; Boeck, 1871

Species
- See text

= Pontogeneia (crustacean) =

Genus of crustaceans

o

Pontogeneia is a genus of amphipods in the family Pontogeneiidae. It contains the following species:

- Pontogeneia andrijashevi Gurjanova, 1951
- Pontogeneia arenaria Bulycheva, 1952
- Pontogeneia bartschi Shoemaker, 1948
- Pontogeneia inermis (Kroyer, 1838)
- Pontogeneia intermedia Gurjanova, 1938
- Pontogeneia ivanovi Gurjanova, 1951
- Pontogeneia kondakovi Gurjanova, 1951
- Pontogeneia littorea Ren, 1992
- Pontogeneia melanophthalma Gurjanova, 1938
- Pontogeneia opata J. L. Barnard, 1979
- Pontogeneia redfearni Thurston, 1974
- Pontogeneia rostrata Gurjanova, 1938
- Pontogeneia stocki Hirayama, 1990

== Overview ==
Pontogeneia is a genus of amphipod crustaceans within the family Pontogeneiidae. First described by Norwegian biologist Axel Boeck in 1871, members of this genus are small, laterally compressed marine invertebrates distributed across cold and temperate coastal waters, with high densities documented in the North Atlantic, Arctic Ocean, and North Pacific. They primarily inhabit shallow subtidal environments, including rocky intertidal zones, macroalgal kelp beds, and seagrass meadows, where they cling to submerged vegetation. Functioning as omnivorous scavengers and detritivores, Pontogeneia species consume microalgae, epiphytes, and organic debris. This places them as an intermediary link in marine food webs, converting primary organic matter into biomass that is subsequently preyed upon by juvenile fish, marine birds, and larger predatory invertebrates. Due to their sensitivity to shifting parameters such as water temperature, salinity, and contaminants, certain species within the genus are utilized in ecological research as bioindicators to monitor nearshore environmental health and the impacts of climate change.
