= Luis Marden =

American photographer, explorer, writer, filmmaker, diver, navigator, and linguist

- Born: Annibale Luigi Paragallo; January 25, 1913; Chelsea, Massachusetts, U.S.
- Died: March 3, 2003 (aged 90); Arlington, Virginia, U.S.
- Spouse: Ethel Cox Marden

Luis Marden (born Annibale Luigi Paragallo) (January 25, 1913 – March 3, 2003) was an American photographer, explorer, writer, filmmaker, diver, navigator, and linguist who worked for National Geographic Magazine. He worked as a photographer and reporter before serving as chief of the National Geographic foreign editorial staff. He was a pioneer in the use of color photography, both on land and underwater, and also made many discoveries in the world of science.

Though he officially retired in 1976, Marden continued to write occasional stories. In total, he wrote more than 60 articles for the magazine.

== Background ==
Born in Chelsea, Massachusetts, of Italian heritage, Marden went by the name Louis Paragallo while growing up in nearby Quincy. Marden was introduced to photography at a chemistry class while attending Quincy Senior High School. His interest was intense and lasting. In 1932, at the age of 19, he wrote a book called Color Photography with the Miniature Camera, which may be the first book ever published on 35mm color photography.

Marden began his career at the WMEX radio station in the Boston area, where he had a photography program called Camera Club of the Air. On his station manager's recommendation, he changed his name to Luis Marden, his new surname a random selection from a phone book. He then worked as a freelance photographer for The Boston Herald.

His expertise in color photography subsequently brought him to National Geographic magazine, where he was officially hired on July 23, 1934. The magazine prided itself on publishing quality color photography, and Marden was making good use of a lightweight Leica, which could hang from a single neck strap. Marden persuaded the magazine to see the benefits of using the small 35mm cameras loaded with the new Kodachrome film over the bulky cameras with tripods and glass plates that were being used by the magazine's photographers at the time.

Marden's first assignment as a reporter was in the Yucatán Peninsula. After sailing on a tramp steamer, Marden explored the peninsula with a Model T Ford. He then acquired a mule.

Marden died of complications from Parkinson's disease in Arlington, Virginia, at the age of 90.

== Underwater photography and diving ==
In 1941, Marden dove off Antigua, where he saw his first coral reef. Marden's knowledge of Spanish led to his appointment during World War II as National Geographic's "Latin America man," and Marden was sent on assignments throughout Central America, most notably In Nicaragua, which he visited for almost an entire month in mid July 1944, then South America, and the Caribbean.

Deciding he wanted to photograph the riches of the deep, Marden worked with Jacques Cousteau aboard the Calypso in the mid-1950s. A pioneer of underwater color photography, Marden developed many techniques in this field that are still used today, such as the use of filters and auxiliary lighting in order to enhance color.

Marden and fellow National Geographic photographer Bates Littlehales suffered decompression sickness after diving in the Cenote Xlacah, the holy Mayan well at Dzibilchaltun in the Yucatán. An attempt to treat Marden with an improvised recompression chamber at a power plant in Mérida failed, and the two men were airlifted to Panama City, Florida, where they were successfully treated at the Navy Mine Defense Laboratory.

Marden discovered the remains of Captain Bligh's HMS Bounty in January 1957. After spotting a rudder from this ship in a museum on Fiji, he persuaded his editors to let him dive off Pitcairn Island, where the rudder had been recovered. Despite the warnings of one islander—"Man, you gwen be dead as a hatchet!"—Marden dived for several days in the dangerous swells near the island and found the remains of the fabled ship. He subsequently met with Marlon Brando to counsel him on his role as Fletcher Christian in the 1962 film Mutiny on the Bounty. Later in life, when he stuck with his tailored English suits while his colleagues wore more casual attire, Marden also wore cuff links made of nails from the Bounty. MGM had a reconstruction of the Bounty built for their 1962 film, also named Bounty. This vessel was built, of wood, to the original plans, in a traditional manner in a shipyard in Lunenburg, Nova Scotia. However, all the dimensions were increased by approximately one third to accommodate the large cameras in use at that time.

At the island of Tofua (Bligh spelled it Tofoa), Bligh and 18 loyalists had sought refuge in a cave in order to augment their meager provisions. In the March 1968 issue of the National Geographic Magazine, Marden claimed to have found this cave as well as the grave of John Norton, a crewman stoned to the death by the Tofuans. Both findings were later disproved by Bengt Danielsson (who had been a member of the 1947 Kon-Tiki expedition) in the June 1985 issue of the Pacific Islands Monthly. Danielsson identified Bligh's cave as lying on the sheltered northwest coast, where Bligh identified it; Marden's cave lies on the exposed southeast coast. Additionally, Danielsson thought it highly unlikely that the Tofuans would have allotted any grave site to Norton, or that the grave, if allotted, would have been preserved for two centuries.

For the October 1985 story "In Bounty's Wake: Finding the Wreck of the HMS Pandora," Marden dove off the coast of Cape York Peninsula, Australia, in 1984 to cover the wreck of HMS Pandora, the ship sent to capture the Bounty mutineers. Pandora had foundered on an Australian reef with manacled prisoners still inside a deckhouse cell.

== Marden and the Guanahani debate ==
In 1986 Marden and his wife Ethel Cox Marden, who was trained as a mathematician, attempted to replot the route they believed Christopher Columbus must have taken across the Atlantic. Though officially retired, Marden set sail from the Canary Islands to retrace Columbus's voyage to the New World. The Mardens concluded that Columbus made his first landfall—Columbus's "Guanahani"—at Samana Cay, not at San Salvador Island, also posited as Columbus's landfall, arguing that Columbus had landed much farther south than was initially believed.

== Activities as a linguist ==
As a teenager, Marden had taught himself at least five languages as well as Egyptian hieroglyphs and later studied many others. His office is reported to have had stacks of dictionaries and grammars in different languages, including Tahitian, Fijian, Latin, Spanish, French, Italian, Danish, Arabic, Tongan, Turkish, and Māori Marden is cited as an authority in Webster's Third New International Dictionary for words such as "snick," "tot," and "sevillana."

== Fly-rods and bamboo ==
Marden was an avid fly-fisherman, which led to his interest in bamboo, of which finer fly rods are made. This love led him to the bamboo groves of China's Guangdong, thereby becoming, in 1974, the first National Geographic representative since the Communist Revolution of 1949 to return to this country. Marden observed and photographed the cultivation and processing of Tonkin bamboo in its restricted growing area in southern China.

This assignment produced the article "Bamboo, The Giant Grass" (1980). "Raw material for implements of peace and war, this botanical cousin to rice, corn, and Kentucky bluegrass may be the world's most useful plant," Marden would write. Marden also recounted the under-the-table maneuverings he engaged in for entry to Maoist China.

Marden made his own bamboo fishing rods. In 1997, he published his second book, The Angler's Bamboo, which not only describes the cultivation and processing of Tonkin bamboo, but also traces the history of the split-bamboo fishing rod.

== Other activities ==
Marden worked for NASA for a time, taking innovative photographs of rocket launches and the activities of the Project Mercury astronauts.

He was a founding member of the Sea Research Society and served on its board of advisers. In 1972 he participated in the creation of the research/professional degree of doctor of marine histories.

He also made 11 travelogue films for the Society's lecture series.

In the early 1990s, he flew ultralight aircraft. Marden owned and piloted a Quicksilver MX from Whitman's Strip, a small airport in the Virginia countryside.

== Friendships and honors ==
Marden served as chief of the National Geographic foreign editorial staff, in which capacity he met and maintained friendships with King Hussein of Jordan and the King of Tonga and was knighted by the Italian government.

== Marden House ==
Marden and his wife, Ethel Cox Marden, lived in "Fontinalis" (also known as Marden House), a house overlooking the Potomac built by Frank Lloyd Wright between 1952 and 1959. The spot had caught Marden's eye in 1944 when he and his wife and had been fishing for hickory shad (Alosa mediocris) along the Potomac, near Chain Bridge. After purchasing a plot of land, Marden continued the correspondence he had maintained with Wright since 1940, asking the architect to design a home for them. In 1938 Marden had seen a "dream house" in Life that Wright had designed for the typical American family.

It was not until 1952 that the designs from Wright finally came. The house is a flat-roofed, cinderblock home trimmed in mahogany that curves into the side of a hill; it comes to an abrupt point upriver, like the bow of a boat. "Our beautiful house ... stands proudly just under the brow of the hill, looking down always on the rushing water which constantly sings to it, day and night, winter and summer," Ethel wrote to Wright in 1959.

After Marden moved to a nursing home in 1998, the house was purchased and refurbished by Jim Kimsey, co-founder of AOL, in 2000 for $2.5 million.

== Discoveries ==
Marden was credited with the discovery of the remains of the HMS Bounty off the coast of Bounty Bay, Pitcairn Island, in January 1957.

The National Geographic Society in Washington holds a specimen of an Aepyornis egg that was discovered by Marden in 1967 in Madagascar. The specimen is intact and contains an embryonic skeleton of the unborn bird.

Marden discovered the orchid Epistephium mardenii in Brazil, which is described in his April 1971 article on orchids, "The Exquisite Orchids." The name is actually a synonym for Epistephium duckei.

He also discovered a deepwater lobster parasite deep in the Atlantic that was a new species of crustacean. It was later called Dolobrotus mardeni (Amphipoda order, Gammaridea suborder, Eusiridae family).

His reporting of a sea anemone in the Red Sea flashing different colors became the first published report of submarine or underwater fluorescence.

== Named after Marden ==
- The orchid species Epistephium mardenii
- The sea flea Dolobrotus mardeni
