= Nasageneia =

Scientific classification
- Kingdom: Animalia
- Phylum: Arthropoda
- Clade: Pancrustacea
- Class: Malacostraca
- Order: Amphipoda
- Family: Pontogeneiidae
- Genus: Nasageneia; Barnard & Karaman, 1987

Genus of amphipods

Nasageneia is a genus of amphipods belonging to the family Pontogeneiidae.

The species of this genus are found in Northern and Central America.

Species:

- Nasageneia bacescui Ortiz & Lalana, 1994
- Nasageneia comisariensis Ortiz & Lemaitre, 1997
