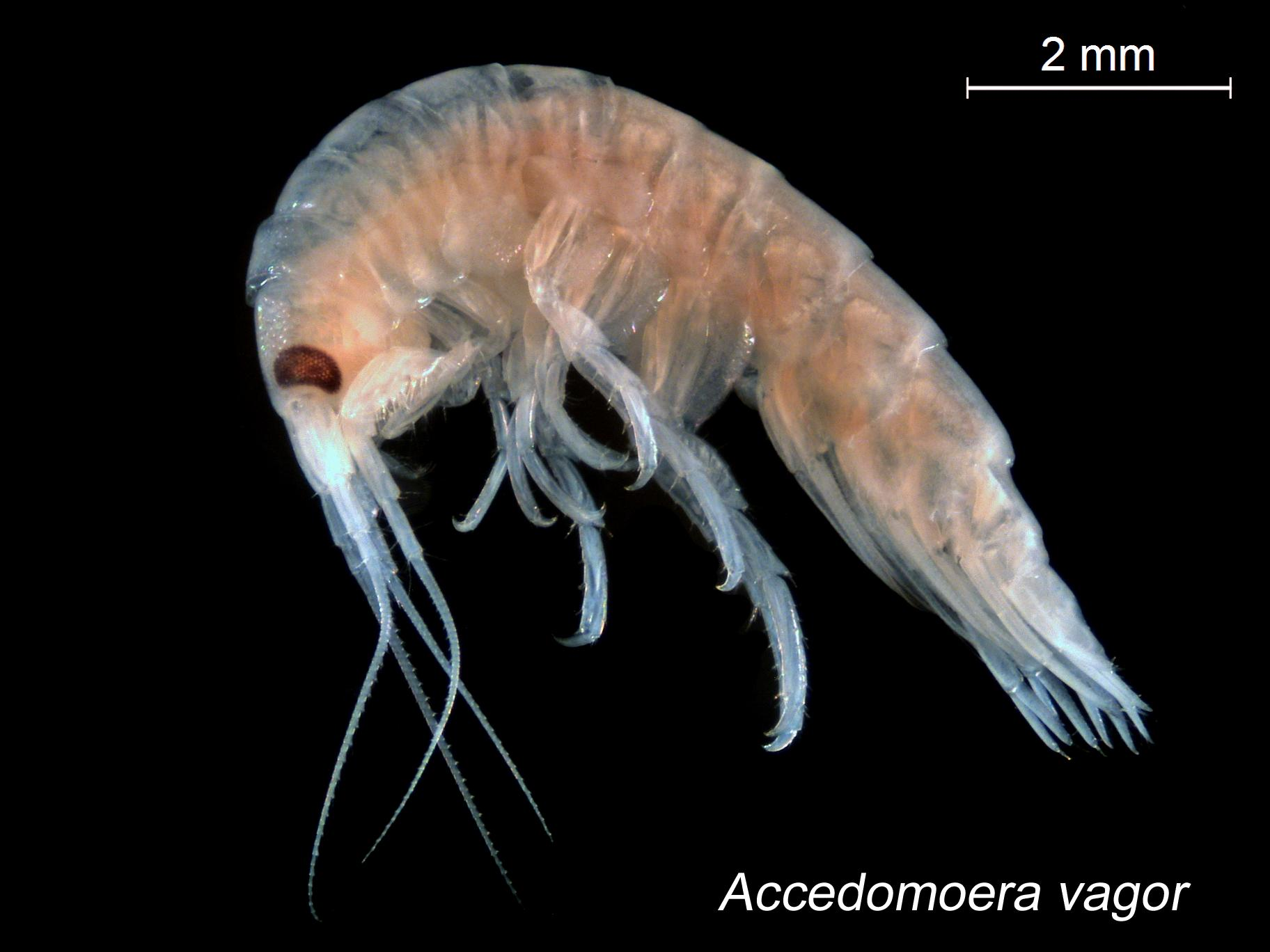
- Accedomoera vagor

Scientific classification
- Kingdom: Animalia
- Phylum: Arthropoda
- Clade: Pancrustacea
- Class: Malacostraca
- Order: Amphipoda
- Suborder: Senticaudata
- Infraorder: Hadziida
- Parvorder: Hadziidira
- Superfamily: Calliopioidea
- Family: Pontogeneiidae; Stebbing, 1906

= Pontogeneiidae =

Family of crustaceans

Pontogeneiidae is a family of amphipod crustaceans, containing the following genera:

- Abdia Barnard & Karaman, 1987
- Accedomoera J. L. Barnard, 1964
- Antarctogeneia Thurston, 1974
- Atyloella Schellenberg, 1929
- Awacaris Uéno, 1971
- Bathyschraderia Dahl, 1959
- Bovallia Pfeffer, 1888
- Dautzenbergia Chevreux, 1900
- Djerboa Chevreux, 1906
- Eurymera Pfeffer, 1888
- Eusiroides Stebbing, 1888
- Gondogeneia J. L. Barnard, 1972
- Haliogeneia Lowry & Stoddart, 1998
- Inhaca Ortiz, Berze-Freire & Wasikete, 1990
- Liouvillea Chevreux, 1911
- Luckia Bellan-Santini & Thurston, 1996
- Nasageneia Barnard & Karaman, 1987
- Paramoera Miers, 1875
- Paramoerella Ruffo, 1974
- Pleusiroides Ortiz, Lalana & Varela, 2007
- Pontogeneia Boeck, 1871
- Prostebbingia Schellenberg, 1926
- Pseudomoera Schellenberg, 1929
- Pseudopontogeneia Oldevig, 1959
- Relictomoera Barnard & Karaman, 1991
- Ronco J. L. Barnard, 1965
- Rozinante Stebbing, 1894
- Schraderia Pfeffer, 1888
- Sennaia Bellan-Santini, 1997
- Sternomoera Barnard & Karaman, 1991
- Tethygeneia J. L. Barnard, 1972

== See also ==
- Schraderia mardeni
