= Paramoera =

Scientific classification
- Kingdom: Animalia
- Phylum: Arthropoda
- Clade: Pancrustacea
- Class: Malacostraca
- Order: Amphipoda
- Family: Pontogeneiidae
- Genus: Paramoera; Miers, 1875

Species
- See text

Genus of amphipod crustaceans

Paramoera is a genus of amphipods in the family Pontogeneiidae. It contains the following species:

- Paramoera aucklandica (Walker, 1908)
- Paramoera bidentata K. H. Barnard, 1932
- Paramoera brachyura Schellenberg, 1931
- Paramoera capensis (Dana, 1853)
- Paramoera chevreuxi (Stephensen, 1927)
- Paramoera edouardi Schellenberg, 1929
- Paramoera falklandica Vader & Krapp, 2005
- Paramoera fasciculata (Thomson, 1880)
- Paramoera fissicauda (Dana, 1852)
- Paramoera gregaria (Pfeffer, 1888)
- Paramoera hamiltoni Nicholls, 1938
- Paramoera hermitensis K. H. Barnard, 1932
- Paramoera hurleyi Thurston, 1974
- Paramoera husvikensis Thurston, 1974
- Paramoera incognita Bushueva, 1986
- Paramoera kergueleni Bellan-Santini & Ledoyer, 1974
- Paramoera macquariae Nicholls, 1938
- Paramoera obliquimana K. H., Barnard 1932
- Paramoera parva Ruffo, 1949
- Paramoera pfefferi Schellenberg, 1931
- Paramoera schellenbergi Nicholls, 1938
- Paramoera tristanensis K. H. Barnard, 1932
- Paramoera walkeri (Stebbing, 1906)
