= Homegrown Player Rule =

Homegrown Player Rule may refer to:

- Homegrown Player Rule (Major League Soccer), USA
- Homegrown Player Rule (England)
- Homegrown Player Rule (UEFA)
