= Sportian =

Spanish sports technology organization

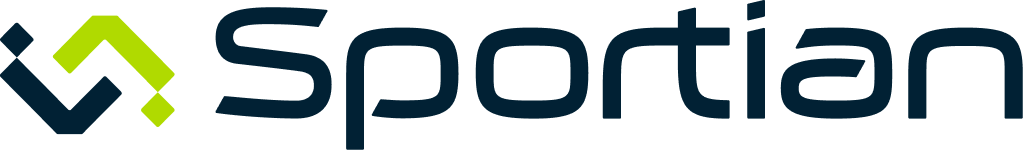
- Headquarters: Madrid
- Leader: Luis Ureta
- Website: https://www.sportian.com/

Sportian is an international sports technology company and the specialized sports tech division of Globant and LALIGA. Headquartered in Spain and operating across regional offices across five continents, the company provides unique products, software platforms and artificial intelligence tools to sports organizations worldwide.

Originally launched in September 2021 as LALIGA Tech, the business was rebranded as Sportian in October 2023 following the joint venture agreement between Spanish football league LALIGA and multinational technology consultancy Globant.

== Origins and History ==
In 2013, LALIGA initiated an internal technology initiative under President Javier Tebas to develop proprietary software for competition management, anti-piracy enforcement, content streaming and fan engagement. Having built an internal portfolio of digital platforms over the following years, LALIGA commercialized its technology stack in September 2021 by establishing LaLiga Tech as a standalone entity under CEO Miguel Ángel Leal.

In September 2022, LALIGA formed a joint venture with global AI and software development company Globant to scale the business globally. The company formally launched its current brand in October 2023.

== Client Base ==
Sportian serves more than 75 active sports clients, reaching over 500 million monthly active users across major international leagues, clubs, federations and broadcasters. Prominent sports properties utilizing Sportian technology include LALIGA and the 42 professional clubs in Spain, Serie A, the Saudi Pro League, MotoGP, the Belgian Pro League, Euroleague Basketball, the Mexican Football Federation, Club America and USMNT coach Mauricio Pochettino.

== Product Portfolio ==
Sportian offers modular products from a single sports operating system, designed to bring efficiency and data transparency to sports organizations while uncovering new growth opportunities. Its solutions are broadly categorized under three verticals: fan engagement, sports performance and business operations.

=== Fan Engagement and Digital Platforms ===
- Maker: A sports CMS platform for connected app and web experiences, used to create custom platforms and digital touchpoints for fans.
- Fantasy: A second-screen gaming platform that enables leagues and clubs to build their official fantasy sports competitions.
- Sports Marketing Services: A dedicated team helping to grow, engage and monetize fanbases through multichannel marketing strategies.
- Game Hub: Connected suite of gamification platforms such as predictions, live voting and quizzes.
- Smart Venues: An end-to-end technology framework to build unique personalized fan journeys across sports venues.

=== Sports Performance ===
- Sportian Performance: The sports data, live video and AI platform used by world-leading coaches to gain a sporting edge. Performance combines high-resolution camera feeds, positional tracking and predictive analytics to provide clear insights to coaching teams in live match, pre-match or post-match scenarios.
- Competition Management: A suite of tools to streamline manual processes including match scheduling, kit and lineup selection, player registrations and club finances.

=== Business Operations ===
- One Venue: An integrated stadium management system unifying access control, ticketing, venue configuration and back-office operations.
- Piracy Guard: 24/7 content protection services that fight against sports piracy through a series of detection, analysis and removal tools.
- Minds: A unified data platform that aggregates user identities, consent choices and interaction history into centralized profiles.
