= Luckia =

Scientific classification
- Kingdom: Animalia
- Phylum: Arthropoda
- Clade: Pancrustacea
- Class: Malacostraca
- Order: Amphipoda
- Family: Pontogeneiidae
- Genus: Luckia; Bellan-Santini & Thurston, 1996
- Species: L. striki

Binomial name
- Luckia striki Bellan-Santini & Thurston, 1996

Genus of crustaceans

Luckia is a genus of amphipod crustaceans in the family Pontogeneiidae, with the sole species Luckia striki. It is found in hydrothermal vents in the Atlantic Ocean.

== Description ==
Luckia have compressed bodies and short rostra. Hatchlings are around 1.5 millimetres (0.1 in) long. Adult females measure approximately 8 millimetres (0.31 in), the length of their first antenna; the second antenna is about half that length. Their body is smooth, and they have no eyes. The joints are slender and linear, with a cleft triangular telson. Their flagella have two parts, and their labrum is whole, with triturative molars. The outer rami are shorter than the inner ones, and they have a smooth third epimeral plate.

== Distribution ==
Luckia striki are found in hydrothermal vents in the Mid-Atlantic Ridge, between depths of 1,670 metres (5,480 ft) and 2,250 metres (7,380 ft), in temperatures around 4.26 °C (39.7 °F). The species has been found in the Lucky Strike site (37°17′N 32°16′W), over the Rainbow Hydrothermal Field (36°14′N 33°54′W), and at the Menez Gwen field (37°50′N 31°31′W).

== Taxonomy ==
Amphipods are more common in Pacific hydrothermal vents than in Atlantic ones, and before 1996, only two species, Andaniotes ingens and Hirondellea brevicaudata were known to exist in the Atlantic. The genus was discovered by Denise Bellan-Santini and Michael H. Thurston in 1996, when it was collected in a vent along with shrimps, gastropods, crabs, and limpets at the Lucky Strike site above the Mid-Atlantic Ridge, the species's namesake.
