= Eupraxie Gurjanova =

Soviet hydrobiologist, carcinologist and zoogeographer

- Born: Eupraxie Fedorovna Gurjanova; 25 January 1902; Cherepovets, Russian Empire
- Died: 27 January 1981 (aged 79); Leningrad, USSR (now St. Petersburg, Russia)
- Citizenship: Russian citizenship, Soviet citizenship
- Awards: Order of the Red Banner of Labour, Order of Friendship (Vietnam)
- Scientific career
- Fields: hydrobiology, carcinology, zoogeography

Eupraxie Fedorovna Gurjanova (25 January 1902, Cherepovets – 27 January 1981, Leningrad) was a Soviet hydrobiologist, carcinologist and zoogeographer, specialist in the systematics of isopod crustaceans and amphipods, doctor of biological sciences.

== Life and education ==
Eupraxie Gurjanova was born on 12 (25) January 1902 in Cherepovets, Novgorod province. Her father, Fedor Gurjanov, was originally from Kiev. He taught mathematics in Cherepovets real college for over 30 years and then became an inspector and received personal nobility. Gurjanova's mother, Tatiana, was originally from Tver region. Gurjanova was the eighth of eleven children in the family.

In 1919, Gurjanova entered Kazan University, where she attended lectures by Professor Nikolay Livanov, successfully passed the exams, but soon she contracted typhus and had to interrupt studies. After the illness the following year, Gurjanova was transferred to the biological department of the Physics and Mathematics Faculty of Petrograd University where she started her scientific work in the field of hydrobiology under Professor Konstantin Deryugin. In summer 1921, together with a group of Professor Deryugin's other students, Gurjanova went to the Murmansk Biological Station of the Petrograd Society of Naturalists and was engaged in the study of coastal areas of the Kola Bay. In 1922, Gurjanova participated in a large scale and complex expedition to the White Sea. In 1923, Gurjanova continued studying the coastal areas of the Kola Bay, and from 1922 until 1925 she was an employee of Murmansk biological station where she received her first pedagogical experience.

Gurjanova graduated from Leningrad University in 1924.

From 1925 until 1929, Gurjanova studied at the graduate school of the hydrobiology laboratory of the Peterhof Institute of Natural Sciences. During this time, she was helping Professor Deryugin to conduct practical classes with students. Soon she began a course of lectures on hydrobiology.

== Work ==
In 1929, Gurjanova graduated from the graduate school and was transferred to work at the Zoological Institute. At the Zoological Institute Gurjanova studied two groups of crustaceans – Isopoda and Amphipoda – becoming one of world's specialists in the field and writing capital monographies on this subject. In the 1930–1960s Gurjanova took part in many expeditions in the western part of the Pacific Ocean.

She explored marine biology, working in the White and Bering seas, Kuril and Sakhalin islands areas, and the northwestern Pacific Ocean. From 1939 to 1952 Gurjanova was a member of the department of hydrobiology and ichthyology at Leningrad State University. After the death of Professor Deryugin, she took over responsibility for the department.

Since 1946, Gurjanova was in charge of the Department of Higher Crustaceans at the Zoological Institute of the Academy of Sciences of the USSR. In 1946–1949, Gurjanova was working as a deputy chief in the Kuril-Sakhalin expedition.

In 1951, her capital report on amphipods Bokoplavy morey SSSR (Amphipoda-Gammaridea of the seas of the USSR and adjoining waters) was published.) In 1962, one more Gurjanova's monography was published Bokoplavy sevemoi chasti Tikhogo okeana (Amphipoda Gammaridea). Chasti I. (Scud shrimps (Amphipoda Gammaridea) of the northern part of the Pacific Ocean. Part 1).

In 1956–1960, Gurjanova worked as part of the Soviet-Chinese expedition in the Yellow Sea. In 1961, she began to study the Gulf of Tonkin in the Soviet-Vietnamese expedition. Her last expeditions were on Cuba in 1963, 1965 and 1968.

Gurjanova repeatedly represented Soviet science abroad. In 1963, she was a part of the organizing committee for the Institute of Oceanology for the Cuban Academy of Sciences. In 1966, at the invitation of the Royal Society of England, Gurjanova gave a number of lectures on hydrobiology in London. In 1967, she chaired in the section of the International biological symposium in Norway and participated in the work of the IX Pacific Scientific Congress in Thailand.

During her scientific career, Gurjanova described over 260 species and subspecies of amphipods new for science (including 27 independent genera and 4 families) and published about 200 scientific papers on various issues of fauna, bionomy and biogeography of the sea. Eupraxie Gurjanova died on 27 January 1981 in Leningrad.

Following marine organisms were named in her honour: Gurjanovella Uschakov, 1926, Rhizellobiopsis eupraxiae (Zachs, 1923), Lineus gurjanovae Korotkevich, 1977, Lepidepecreum gurjanovae Hurley, 1963, Metridia gurjanovae Epstein, 1949, Vitjaziana gurjanovae Birstein & Vinogradov, 1955, Amicula gurjanovae Jakovleva, 1952, Rhizolepas gurjanovae Zevina, 1968, Lithacrosiphon gurjanovae Murina, 1967, Protomedeia gurjanovae Bulycheva, 1951, Eugerda gurjanovae Malyutina & Kussakin, 1996, Eohaustorius gurjanovae Bousfield & Hoover, 1995, Onchidiopsis gurjanovae Derjugin, 1937, Glycinde gurjanovae Uschakov & Wu, 1962, Samytha gurjanovae Ushakov, 1950, Ritterella gurjanovae Beniaminson, 1974.

== Publications (selection) ==
- 1933 - Contribution to the Fauna of Crustacea-Malacostraca of the Obj-Enisej Bay. Explor. de la Mer U.S.S.R
- 1936 - Fauna SSSR : novaja serija 6 Rakoobraznye; T. 7, Vyp. 3 : Ravnonogie dalʹnevostočnych morej
- 1951 - Bokoplavy Morei SSSR i Sopredel’nykh Vod. (Amphipoda-Gammaridea). Izd. Akademia Nauk SSSR, Moscow & Leningrad.
- 1962 - Bokoplavy severnoj časti Tichogo Okeana: (Amphipoda-Gammaridea). Č. 1
