= Ture =

Ture may refer to:

== Names ==
- Ture (Zande character), a trickster character from North Central Africa

=== Personal name ===
- Ture Bengtz (1907–1973), Finnish-American artist
- Ture Hedman (1895–1950), Swedish gymnast
- Ture Holmberg (1886–1954), Swedish sports shooter
- Ture Isberg (1900–1989), Swedish footballer
- Ture Junttu (1911–1981), Finnish actor
- Ture Kailo (d. 2009), Vanuatuan politician
- Ture Malmgren (1851–1922), Swedish journalist and politician
- Ture Nerman (1886–1969), Swedish author and politician
- Ture Ödlund (1894–1942), Swedish curler
- Ture Persson (1892–1956), Swedish sprinter
- Ture Rangström (1884–1947), Swedish composer
- Ture Rosvall (1891–1977), Swedish rower
- Ture Sjölander (born 1937), Swedish animator
- Ture Turesson (Bielke) (1425–1489/90), Swedish statesman
- Ture Wersäll (1883–1965), Swedish gymnast
- Ture Zahab (born David HaLevi Segal, c. 1586–1667), Polish rabbinical authority

=== Family name ===
- Joseph Ture Jr. (born 1951), American serial killer
- Kwame Ture or Stokely Carmichael (1941–1998), American civil rights organizer
- Muhammad Ture (1443–1538), ruler of the Askia Dynasty of the Songhai Empire
- Norman Ture, American researcher
- Samori Ture (c. 1830–1900), founder of the Wassoulou Empire
- Seku Ture (1922–1984), president of Guinea
- Shahrul Azhar Ture (born 1985), Malaysian footballer

== Fictional characters ==
- Ture Sventon, a fictional detective

== Places ==
- Ture River or Turcu, a tributary of the Jolotca in Romania
- Ture, Drumlane a townland in County Cavan
- Türe, the Hungarian name for Turea village, Gârbău Commune, Cluj County, Romania
- Tureholm Castle, a listed building in Trosa Municipality, Sweden
- Tureholm, Sweden, a locality in Ekerö Municipality

=== Ture Malmgren ===
Places named for Ture Malmgren, all located in Uddevalla, Sweden:

- Tureborg Castle, a mock castle built by Malmgren atop Fjällsätern
- Tureborg, a district of Uddevalla
- Ture Valleys, a nature reserve
- Tureholm, an artificial island
- Tomb of Ture Malmgren

== See also ==
- Turing
- Thure
- Touré
- Amadu Turé (born 1993), Bissau-Guinean footballer
