= Tureholm (island) =

River island in Sweden

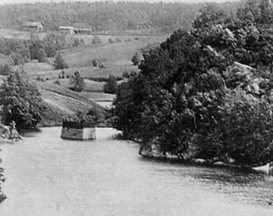
- Tureholm, as it looked in the early 20th century.
- Interactive map of Tureholm

Geography
- Location: Bäveån, Uddevalla
- Coordinates: 58.3453°N 11.9536°E

Administration
- Sweden
- County: Västra Götaland
- Province: Bohuslän

Tureholm is a small and uninhabited artificial river island in Bäveån, which runs through the city of Uddevalla in Bohuslän, Sweden. It was created in the late 19th century or early 20th century by the local politician and publicist Ture Malmgren (1851–1922), close to his residence Villa Elfkullen. According to his newspaper Bohusläningen (writing many years after he died), the process of land reclamation took place because Malmgren enjoyed water, and wanted to be closer to the river. According to another author (who also notes that Malmgren would angle fish from Tureholm, where his "grandiose thoughts had free play"), it partially functioned as a wave breaker, preventing the ice of the late winters from pulling the nearby bridge with it. A small bridge is said to have formerly led from the mainland to its now overgrown embankments. The islet was named in reference to Malmgren by his friends. Other places named for him include the ruined Tureborg Castle and the nature reserve Ture Valleys.

== See also ==
- Fjällsätern
- Tomb of Ture Malmgren
- Fjällhyddan
