= Tomb of Ture Malmgren =

Empty tomb in Sweden

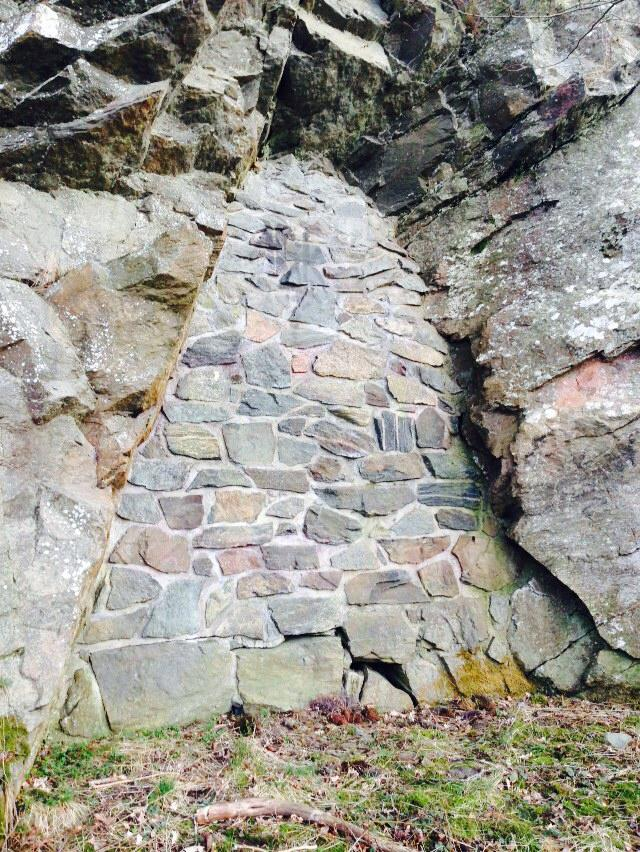
The empty tomb of Ture Malmgren, 2015

The tomb of Ture Malmgren (referred to in Swedish as Tures grav) is a structure located in Uddevalla, Bohuslän, Sweden. It is located by the foot of Fjällsätern, near the center of the residential district of Tureborg (which is named for Tureborg Castle, a ruin atop the mountain's summit). Carved into the sheer cliff face, it was intended as the final resting place of the local politician and publicist Ture Malmgren. Despite his own wishes, Malmgren was instead interred elsewhere after his death in 1922, effectively rendering the empty rock-cut tomb a cenotaph of sorts.

== History ==
Ture Malmgren (born in 1851) is primarily known as the founder of the regional newspaper Bohusläningen, which remains in publication today. Other than his career as a publicist and journalist, he maintained extensive business connections, and was involved in many fields of politics, often radical. Among other things, he was the first chairman of the Uddevalla Suffrage Association, chaired the Uddevalla City Council for many years, and campaigned as a candidate for the Riksdag. In addition to these engagements he was also a keen builder, and constructed several large buildings. Of these, only Villa Elfkullen still stands – his large mock castle Tureborg burned down in 1950, and the faux-medieval summer residence Fjällhyddan was demolished later in the 20th century.

Aside from these three main buildings, many other minor structures created by Malmgren are dotted around the surrounding landscape. One of these is a vaulted cavern cut into the grey rock of Fjällsätern at some point between the 1890s and the 1920s. Following his death on 3 August 1922, the local authorities decided against burying him in his intended final resting place, and instead he was buried at the nearby Eastern Cemetery. There, where he was joined by his wife Hilma Malmgren following her death in 1942, a large tombstone bearing his portrait was raised. The old tomb is now bricked up.

== See also ==
- Tureholm
- Ture Valleys
