= Einar Dahl (Esperantist) =

Swedish politician and esperantist (1904–1979)

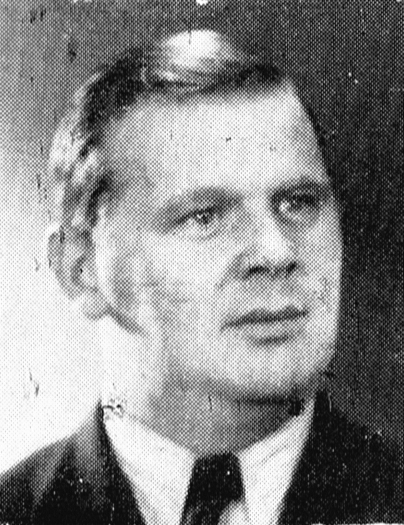

Personal details
- Born: 1 March 1904 Falun, Dalarna, Sweden
- Died: 17 January 1979 (aged 74) Uddevalla, Bohuslän, Sweden

Einar Dahl (1 March 1904, in Falun – 17 January 1979, in Uddevalla, Sweden) was a Swedish Social Democratic politician, temperance man, Esperantist and author.

Dahl was a member of the Swedish parliament from 1954 to 1970. He worked as a school principal in Uddevalla, and was prominent in the Esperanto movement both in Sweden and internationally. He was elected president of the World Esperanto Pacifist League in 1931. For many years he was a member of the executive committee of World Esperanto Association, an organisation he also became an honorary member of.

In 1970 he was awarded the Swedish gold medal "Pro Socia Merito".

== Career ==
Dahl was an eminent figure in Swedish political life, serving as a Social Democratic member of the Riksdag, the Swedish parliament – the second chamber 1954–1958, and the first 1958–1970 (until the same year the chambers was abolished), both times serving for the western constituency part of Västra Götalands län.

Dahl worked first as an elementary school teacher and later as a school principal in Uddevalla. In the 1940s, he wrote the Swedish lyrics for the scout song I naturen ut vi gå ('Jopp hej di'), which in the 1950s was included in the school song book Vår sångbok. He also authored children's theatre plays, and poems.

In the 1930s, Sweden, as elsewhere, had high unemployment, and the Swedish Social Democratic Party was regularly attacked by both Communist and Nazi sympathizers. In February 1932, for example, Swedish unemployment stood at 108,000 and no regular national unemployment insurance system had yet been established. At Uddevalla's annual May Day demonstration in Kungstorget-Folkets Park that year, municipal workers union chair Axel V. Johansson had addressed the crowd of 2,500. In the lull before the main speaker, Axel Lindqvist, M.P., arrived, Einar Dahl, then still a young elementary school teacher, gave an impromptu speech warning young people against the superficial proposals of extremists, declaring that only with deep reflection and earnestness could they build a brighter future.

From 1933 until 1977, Dahl served as secretary of the Gustafsberg Foundation, which operated a boarding school for secondary students in Uddevalla. He took a keen interest in helping students from Uddevalla and Lysekil qualify for admission to the new University of Gothenburg after it opened in 1954.

In 1944, the Gerlesborg School of Fine Art began operating a summer school for the arts in a boarding house in Gerlesborg. The school offered cultural programs including chamber music evenings and art instruction under artist Arne Isacsson. At the Gerlesborg Foundation's inaugural meeting of 16 June 1963, Bohuslän municipal council chair Einar Dahl became vice-president of the Foundation which, with the help of government grants, financed the arts school. Dahl was appointed as the school's principal, but was also principal of Gräskärrs Yrkesskola, a trade school.

After his election on 16 September 1956, Dahl was a member of the Riksdag's second chamber for Bohuslän until the election of 1 June 1958, when he was elected to represent Bohuslän (mandate period 1958–1965) in the first chamber.

== Esperanto activities ==
He learned the international language Esperanto as early as 1921, becoming active within Sweden and also internationally in the Esperanto movement. He wrote Swedish Esperanto learning material and authored booklets of Esperanto dialogues and skits.

He was a director and member of the committee of the World Esperanto Association (Universala Esperanto-Asocio, UEA), director of the Swedish Esperanto Teachers Federation and in 1931 became president of the World Esperanto Pacifist League (Universala Esperantista Pacifista Ligo). In 1949 he was elected secretary-treasurer of the newly founded international League of Esperanto Teachers.

For several years Dahl gathered a strong support among members of the Swedish parliament for nominating the World Esperanto Association as a candidate for the Nobel Peace Prize. In 1965, he was the chief proponent in the Swedish Riksdag of a common Scandinavian proposal that UNESCO should undertake a fundamental inquiry into the need for an international communications medium. Dahl took part in many universal congresses.

He was an honorary member of the World Esperanto Association, and during his many years as a member of the UEA executive committee he helped to pioneer parliamentary activity on behalf of the Esperanto movement.

== Works ==
- 1932: Dialogoj en Esperanto: por kursoj kaj grupaj kunvenoj ("Dialogues in Esperanto for Classes and Group Meetings")
- 1933: Dialogoj kaj komedietoj: por kursoj kaj grupaj kunvenoj ("Dialogues and Comedic Skits for Classes and Group Meetings")
- 1933: Huru leder man fortsättningskurser i Esperanto? ("How does one lead an intermediate course in Esperanto?", Swedish)
- 1946: Lärobok i Esperanto för skolan ("Esperanto Textbook for Schools", Swedish)
- 1947: Arbetsbok i Esperanto ("Workbook in Esperanto", Swedish)
