= Fjällsätern =

Mountain in Sweden

Coordinates: 58.341°N 11.953°E

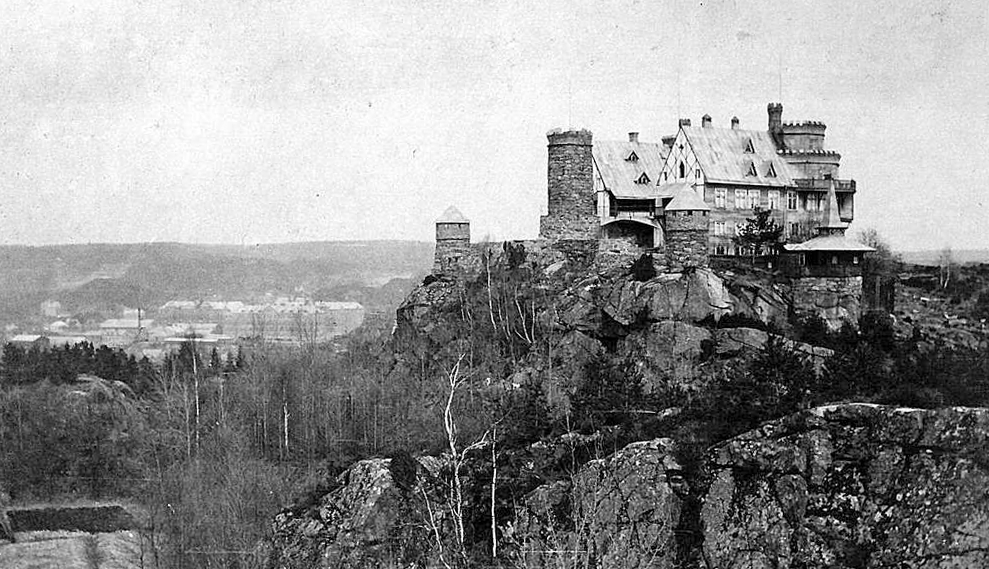
- View of Tureborg Castle in the early 1900s, atop Fjällsätern's highest point

Highest point
- Elevation: 109.5 m (359 ft)

Geography
- Location: Uddevalla, Västra Götaland County, Sweden

Fjällsätern is a minor mountain in southern Uddevalla, Sweden. Its summit reaches 105.9 metres (347 ft) above sea level according to one 1950 estimate (an earlier one from 1903 put it at 300 Swedish feet), making it the area's second highest. There the local politician and publicist Ture Malmgren (1851–1922) began building his grand Tureborg Castle, today a ruin, in 1899. Along its slopes Malmgren constructed several other structures, among them the likewise faux-medieval summer residence Fjällhyddan, and his own would-be tomb. The area was once completely barren, but Malmgren – who was engaged in the tree-planting movement of that time – promised his wife Hilma that she would one day be able to walk beneath trees on Fjällsätern, and set about planting the thick forest of today. A nature reserve named after him, Ture Valleys, is situated on the mountain's eastern side.

During the Second World War, Fjällsätern was used by the Swedish Armed Forces for the town's air defence, as a lookout post. When Tureborg Castle burned down in 1950, the height of the mountain made it difficult for the firemen to reach the fire. No historical remains pre-dating Ture Malmgren's use of the area are known on Fjällsätern, but several Stone Age sites sit by its foot, and the "-säter" suffix often indicates the area was historically used for forest-based livestock grazing.

== See also ==
- Tureholm
