= Tureholm =

Tureholm can refer to:

- Tureholm, Sweden, a locality located in Ekerö Municipality, Sweden
- Tureholm (island), an artificial island located in Uddevalla, Sweden
- Tureholm Castle, a castle located in Trosa Municipality, Sweden
