= Ture Valleys =

Coordinates: 58.341°N 11.961°E

Ture dalar
- Country: Sweden
- Province: Bohuslän

Ture Valleys or Ture's Valleys (Swedish: Ture dalar and Tures dalar) is a nature reserve in the town of Uddevalla, Sweden. Located by the foot of the mountain Fjällsätern, on which Tureborg Castle stands, close to the Tureborg district, the area is named for Ture Malmgren (1851–1922), a prominent, wealthy and highly eccentric local politician and newspaper owner, once chairman of the Uddevalla city council and founder of Bohusläningen. Originally proposed in 1979, a plan to survey the area was put in place in 1988, and the nature reserve was finally created in 1991. The nature reserve – administrated by Uddevalla Municipality, and about seven hectares large – is a popular hiking area.

It consists of a very diverse landscape. In the north, Hålebäcken (A tributary of Bäveån) has cut through the calcareous soil, creating a system of ravines. In the south there is an alder marsh, running through a boulder-covered rift valley. The area is heavily forested, featuring oak, hazel, water elder and elm. The shell-mixed clay provides a habitat for liverwort and toothwort in the springs, and wood stitchwort and giant bellflower in the summers.

== See also ==
- Fjällhyddan
- Tomb of Ture Malmgren
- Villa Elfkullen
