= Fredin =

Fredin is a Swedish surname. Notable people with the surname include:

- Edvard Fredin (1857–1889), Swedish playwright, actor, reviewer, and translator
- Hans Fredin (born 1966), Swedish swimmer
- Ingegärd Fredin (1930–2020), Swedish swimmer
