= Uddevalla Suffrage Association =

Late-19th-century Swedish political movement

The Uddevalla Suffrage Association (Swedish: Uddevalla Rösträttsförening) was a late-19th-century political movement founded in Uddevalla, Sweden. Local historians and the Swedish Social Democratic Party consider it the first political predecessor of the Swedish labour movement in the province of Bohuslän. Its purpose was to bring about universal suffrage in Sweden: At the time, suffrage in the country was restricted to men and based on personal wealth, therefore excluding most of the urban and rural working class from the electoral process. The Uddevalla Suffrage Association was one of many groups throughout Sweden that helped bring democratic thought into the common discourse and make way for the political breakthrough of the labour movement.

== History ==
=== Growth ===
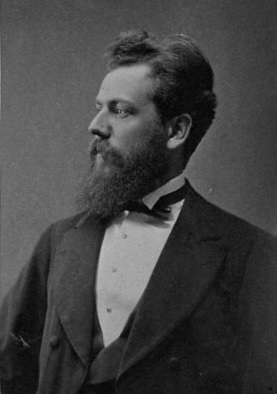
Ture Malmgren, first chairman of the Association, c. 1880s–1900

The foundation of the organization was preceded by an August 1890 election in Gothenburg of a three-person committee intended to foster the creation of regional and local suffrage associations. One of those elected was Ture Malmgren, the owner and editor of the daily newspaper Bohusläningen. On 12 October 1890, the Uddevalla Suffrage Association was formed after a public meeting at the Lancaster School (Lancasterskolan) that was attended by 250 people, described as "mainly men from the manually labouring class". The Association's stated goal was "to gather supporters of the lowering or abolition of the political suffrage limit, and of the equalization of the municipal voting rights".

Malmgren was elected as the Association's first chairman. Other board members were the foreman E. Fredborg as vice chairman, the store manager O. E. Gutke as secretary, the journalist Oskar Malmrot as vice secretary, and the teacher P. Larsson as treasurer. At a formal constituent meeting on 2 November, the membership was reported to exceed 200. Malmgren came to dominate the movement. In speeches, he railed against the graded scale of suffrage, which gave societal and political influence only to the wealthy.

In July 1891, the Association organized its first large rally on Skansberget in central Uddevalla. Between 500 and 600 people attended, and speeches by Malmgren were accompanied by music and singing by the choir of the People's Associations (Folkföreningarna). The same year, the Association joined western Sweden's Suffrage League (Västra Sveriges Rösträttsförbund). In 1893, several prominent members of the Association were elected as delegates to the first People's Riksdag (Folkriksdagen), a national meeting of liberal and socialist supporters of increased voting rights. Three delegates were chosen from Uddevalla: Malmgren, with 2,038 votes; the store owner Albert Andersson, with 1,434 votes; and the locomotive fireman G. A. Dahlqvist, with 615 votes. The debates at the People's Riksdag are said to have been intense, and Malmgren's newspaper stoked the flames. On 18 June 1893, the Association and other pro-democratic forces organized a large rally in central Uddevalla. By this point, Malmgren had resigned as chairman. His successor was Andersson.

=== Decline ===
In the late 1890s, the activities of the Uddevalla Suffrage Association declined as the divide between working-class reformists and more liberally-inclined bourgeoisie became larger. Several working-class activists became prominent in the Association, among them Adolf Bremer and M. A. Ljunggren, as the liberals withdrew. In 1898, the first formal Social Democratic Party branch (Uddevalla arbetarkommun) formed from the merger of several trade union branches, and the Association declined even further. With the decline and the increasing importance of working-class members, it also became more radical. Eventually, the group changed its name to the Uddevalla Suffrage and Discussion Association (Uddevalla Rösträtts- och diskussionsförening), with the purpose of debating social issues.

A prominent member of the Uddevalla branch of the Social Democratic Party, Johannes Hermansson, was assigned to write a new set of statutes for the Association's charter. This didn't happen, possibly because of the demands of the liberal faction. Instead, the Association was dissolved on 12 January 1902, after twelve years of existence. Most of its monetary assets were granted to the Social Democratic Party, which was seen as the ideologically closest movement to the Association. However, 100 kronor were given to the city's theatre association, because the Uddevalla Suffrage Association was one of many local movements that owned shares in the theatre.

== See also ==
- Sweden during the late 19th century
- Timeline of women's suffrage
- Tureborg Castle
