= Fjällhyddan =

Building in Uddevalla, Sweden

Coordinates: 58°20′30″N 11°56′53″E

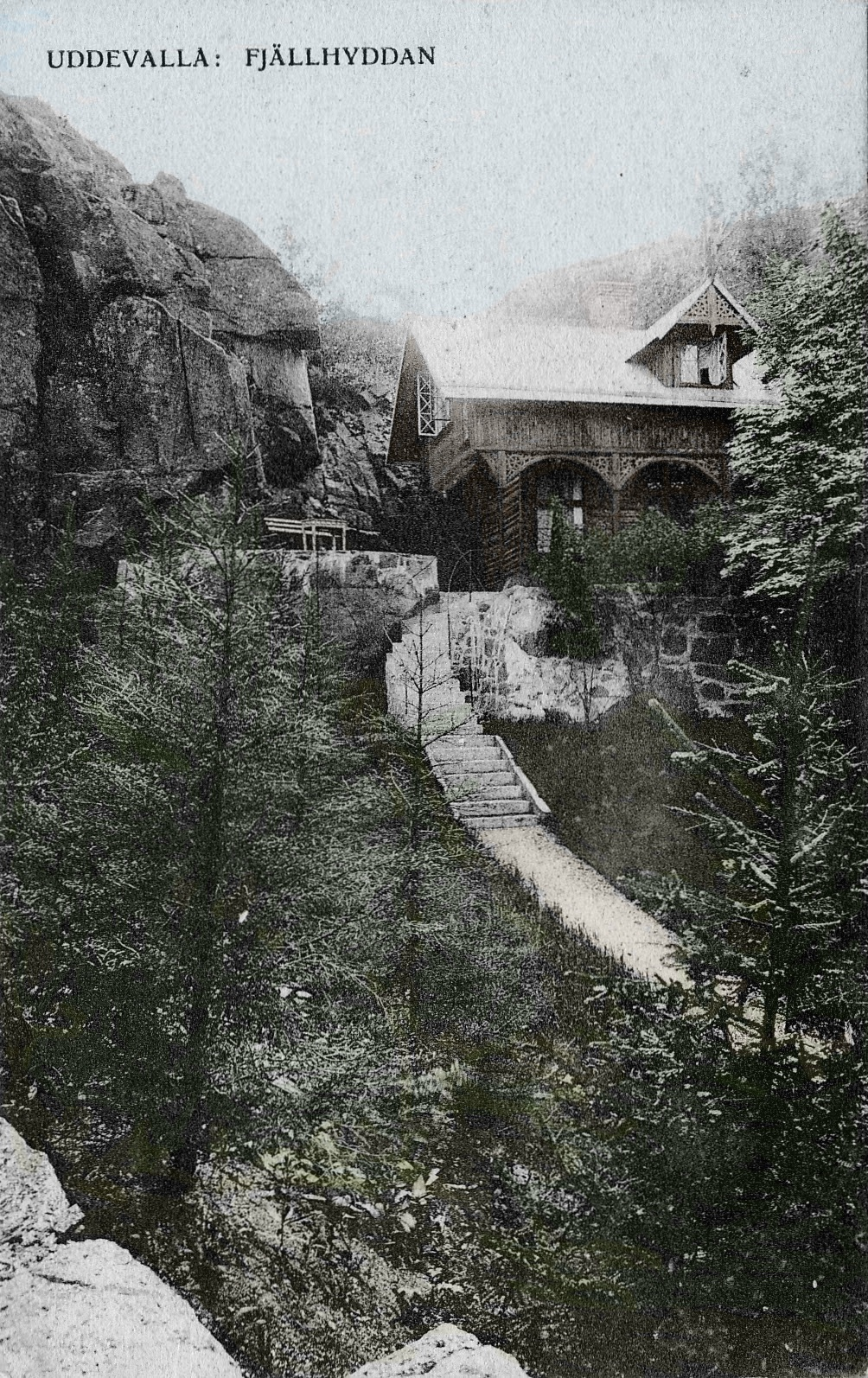
Early 20th-century postcard depicting Fjällhyddan

Fjällhyddan (English: the Mountain Hut), also known as Jakthyddan (English: the Hunting Hut) and other variants of that name, was a building constructed in Uddevalla, Sweden, during the late 19th century. It was created by Ture Malmgren (1851–1922), a prominent – and highly eccentric – local businessman and politician. Today the building is a ruin.

== History ==
Most likely Fjällhyddan's date of construction was somewhere around 1888, a year after Villa Elfkullen and about a decade before Tureborg Castle, its two companion structures. Malmgren, the wealthy founder of the regional Bohusläningen newspaper, as well as a radical politician and general philanthropist, was greatly inspired both by the national romanticism of the era and the long travels of his youth. Journeying through the Rhine Valley, he was captured by the region's grand medieval castles, and decided to build one of his own.

As any lord of a castle, he would however first need a hunting lodge, in his own view. This despite the lack of wild game in the increasingly urbanized Uddevalla outskirts. Constructed in what was then a sunny glade on the slope of the mountain Fjällsätern towards Garvaremyren, Fjällhyddan was a small two-story house located by the foot of a steep cliff and surrounded by lilac bushes. The area could be entered through heavy iron gates in a nearby thick stone wall.

The building was used as a summer home for Carl Gabriel Malmgren, Ture Malmgren's father and a former prominent book printer and newspaper editor. Later some of the younger Malmgren's siblings also lived there for some time. Following his death in 1922 the house was rented out for the next few decades to a number of different families. Exactly when Fjällhyddan was demolished is unknown, but it was most likely during the 1960s or the early 1970s. As of today, the building's ruined foundations still stand, as does the stone archway leading to it.

== See also ==
- History of Bohuslän
- Medieval hunting
- Tureborg Castle
- Ture Valleys
- Tomb of Ture Malmgren
