= Ring Out, Wild Bells =

1850 poem by Alfred Tennyson

- by Alfred, Lord Tennyson
- Country: UK
- Language: English
- Subject(s): New Year
- Publication date: 1850

"Ring Out, Wild Bells" is a poem by Alfred, Lord Tennyson. Published in 1850, the year he was appointed Poet Laureate, it forms part of In Memoriam, Tennyson's elegy to Arthur Henry Hallam, his sister's fiancé who died at the age of 22.

According to a story widely held in Waltham Abbey, and repeated on many websites (see two examples below), the 'wild bells' in question were the bells of the Abbey Church. According to the local story, Tennyson was staying at High Beech in the vicinity and heard the bells being rung on New Year's Eve.

It is an accepted English custom to ring English Full circle bells to ring out the old year and ring in the new year over midnight on New Year's Eve. Sometimes the bells are rung half-muffled for the death of the old year, then the muffles are removed to ring without muffling to mark the birth of the new year. In some versions of the story it was a particularly stormy night and the bells were being swung by the wind rather than by ringers, but this is highly unlikely given the method of ringing English full circle bells, which requires a considerable swinging arc before the clappers will strike the bell.

== The poem ==
- The full text of Ring Out, Wild Bells at Wikisource

== Allusions ==
The Gresham's School chapel bell is inscribed with the last line of the poem, plus an attribution to the donor: "Ring in the Christ that is to be, Donum Dedit J. R. E."

Manchester Town Hall's hour bell, completed in 1850, which is called "Great Abel" after the Town Clerk, Abel Heywood, who oversaw the construction of the building, has the lines "Ring out the false, ring in the true" cast upon its surface.

== Translations ==
A translation into Swedish by Edvard Fredin called "Nyårsklockan" – "The New Year's Bell" – is recited just before the stroke of midnight at the annual New Year's Eve festivities at Skansen in Stockholm, capital of Sweden. This tradition began in 1897 when the young Swedish actor Anders de Wahl was asked to recite the poem. De Wahl then performed the poem annually until his death in 1956. Since 1977 the Swedish national public TV broadcaster, SVT, has aired the event live, and the first to read the poem on television was the actor Georg Rydeberg. The show turned out to be a major success, and watching it on New Year's Eve quickly became a nationwide tradition. Rydeberg recited the poem until his death in 1983. After that many famous Swedish actors and/or singers have recited the poem, for example Jarl Kulle, Jan Malmsjö and Margaretha Krook. The Swedish translation differs significantly from the English original. Additionally, fourth (purer laws) and last (Christ) stanzas are commonly not read.

Inspired by the Swedish tradition, auto manufacturer Volvo used the poem in a 2016 New Year's Eve advertisement.

== Musical settings ==
Charles Gounod's setting for voice and piano, published in 1880, uses verses one, two, three, five, seven, and eight.

Percy Fletcher's 1914 SATB setting includes all but the fifth stanza of the poem, using the second stanza as a recurring refrain

The second, seventh and eighth stanzas were set to music by Karl Jenkins in the finale ("Better is Peace") of The Armed Man.

The first, second and last stanzas were set to music by Crawford Gates; this setting is included in the Church of Jesus Christ of Latter-day Saints 1985 hymnal (hymn number 215).

Jonathan Ward of Magdalen College School composed a setting, while Wiltshire-based composer Stuart Brown has used it as the opening of his song cycle "Idylls", written in 2014 for the London-based soprano Chen Wang.

The composer Simon Gray, performing as The Winterval Conspiracy, set and performed the whole poem as the final song on his album Now That's What I Call 2020!

Augusta Read Thomas's Ring Out, Wild Bells, to the Wild Sky uses the text of the first, second, and eighth stanzas and excerpts from the fourth, sixth, and seventh stanzas along with text from other sections of In Memoriam A.H.H..

The entire poem comprises the lyrics of the final song, Ring Out Wild Bells, on British musician-songwriter Paul Field’s 2016 album Being Me.

The composer Ron Nelson composed a popular setting of the text for a commission by the Windy City Gay Men's Chorus setting for SATB & TTBB voices featuring the 1st, 2nd, 3rd, 4th, and 8th stanzas.
