= Eastern Cemetery (Uddevalla) =

Coordinates: 57.7776°N 14.2033°E

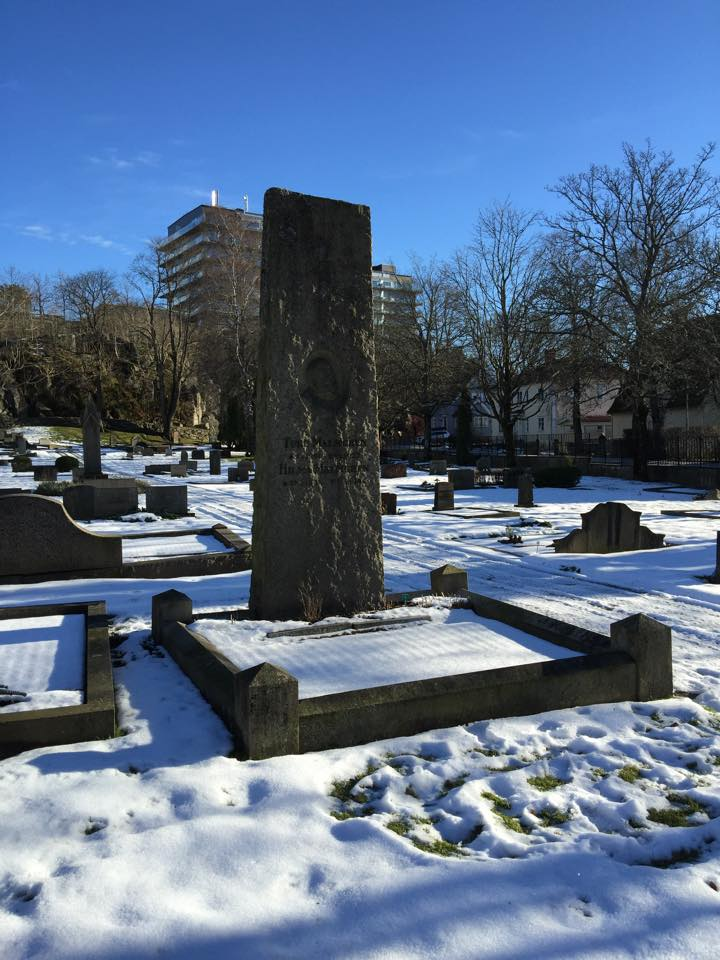
The grave of Ture and Hilma Malmgren, at the Eastern Cemetery.

The Eastern Cemetery (Swedish: Östra kyrkogården) is a cemetery in Uddevalla, Sweden. It belongs to the Church of Sweden, which professes to Lutheranism, and serves as burial grounds for – primarily – the members of Bäve Parish (sv).

== History ==
It is one of the oldest active cemeteries in urban Uddevalla, together with the contemporary Northern Cemetery, which was created 1809–1810. From the medieval period and onwards until the period around the great fire of 1806, most citizens of Uddevalla were buried by the now-lost Saint Mikael's Church. In 1812 land was purchased to house the Eastern Cemetery, which was opened in 1813. The cemetery was expanded southwards in 1892, with an additional land purchase. In 1905 full ownership was handed over to the Church of Sweden, which was the state church at the time.

A number of prominent people from the city have been buried at the Eastern Cemetery, among them the businessman and politician Ture Malmgren, the creator of Tureborg Castle, who died in 1922. His wife Hilma Malmgren survived him by several decades, and was buried next to him following her death in 1942. Other prominent burials include the parish priest Casten Rabe (buried in 1836), the provost Magnus Ullman (1842), the colonel Georg Gillis von Heideman, and a range of members from the historically well-known Bagge family.

In 2015 it was proposed that the walkway by the cemetery would be renamed for the noted Uddevalla historian, Sten Kristiansson, who died in 1957.
