= Thure =

Thure is a masculine given name. Notable people with the surname include:

== Academics and scientists ==
- Thure Björck (1851–1913), Swedish psychiatrist
- Thure Björkman (1895–1989), Swedish agronomist
- Thure Brandrup-Wognsen (1899–1976), Swedish dentist
- Thure E. Cerling (born 1949), American geochemist
- Jarl-Thure Eriksson (born 1944), Finnish professor
- Thure Kumlien (1819–1888), Swedish-American ornithologist, naturalist and taxidermist
- Thure Möller (1859–?), Swedish physician
- Thure Nordenskiöld (1873–1946), Swedish academic
- Thure Nyman (1899–1983) Swedish art historian, author and editor
- Thure Palm (1894–1987), Swedish entomologist
- Thure Reinholds (1906–?), Swedish engineer
- Thure Georg Sahama (1910–1983), Swedish geologist
- Thure Sundberg (1880–1952), Swedish chemist
- Thure Svedlin (1891–1959), Finnish curator, publisher and author
- Thure von Uexküll (1908–2004), German psychosomatic medicine and biosemiotics scholar
- Thure Vidlund (2886–1955), Swedish engineer
- Thure Weidman (1744–1828), Swedish professor and bishop

== Artists ==
- Thure Åslin (1915–1967), Swedish painter
- Thure Cristenson (1911–1981), Swedish painter
- Thure Dahlbeck (1911–1981), Swedish painter
- Thure Hellström (1880–1946), Finnish architect
- Thure Holmgren (1898–1963), Swedish painter
- Thure Löfgren (1921–2002), Swedish painter
- Thure Öberg (1872–1935), Swedish painter
- Thure Rydbeck (1883–1968), Swedish artist
- Thure Stenhed (1915–1982), Swedish painter
- Thure Svensson (painter) (1901–1953), Swedish painter
- Thure de Thulstrup (1848–1930), Swedish-born American illustrator
- Thure Wahlroos (1894–1978), Finnish actor and musician
- Thure Wahlström (1908–1998), Swedish painter

== Film ==
- Thure Alfe (1894–1962), Swedish actor
- Thure Bahne (1909–1956), Finnish singer, actor and director
- Thure Bergentz (1892–1965), Swedish architect
- Thure Floding (1748–1797), Swedish graphic artist
- Thure Lindhardt (born 1974), Danish actor
- Thure Riefenstein, German actor and director
- Thure Thörn (1918–2005), Swedish sculptor

== Politics and law ==
- Thure Andersson (politician) (1908–2002), Swedish politician
- Thure Annerstedt (1806–1880), Swedish politician and bishop
- Thure Dahlberg (1914–1994), Swedish politician
- Thure Drufva (1767–1822), Swedish army officer and politician
- Thure Ekelund (1880–1924), Swedish politician
- Thure Ekenstam (1829–1895), Swedish politician
- Thure Jadestig (1922–2017), Swedish politician
- Thure Leonard Klinckowström (1735–1821), Swedish judge
- Thure Ribbing (1619–1656), Swedish civil servant
- Thure Höglund (1914–1987), Swedish politician

== Sports ==
- Thure Ahlberg (1893–1967), Finnish wrestler and coach
- Thure Ahlqvist (1907–1983), Swedish boxer
- Thure Andersson (1907–1976), Swedish wrestler
- Thure Bengtsson (1921–2003), Swedish cyclist
- Thure Bergvall (1887–1950), Swedish long-distance runner
- Thure Johansson (athlete) (1886–?), Swedish long-distance runner
- Thure Johansson (wrestler) (1912–1986), Swedish wrestler
- Carl Gustaf Moritz Thure Lewenhaupt (1884–1935), Swedish equestrian
- Thure Lindgren (1921–2005), Swedish ski jumper
- Thure Melin (1912–2007), Swedish racing driver and businessman
- Thure Sarnola (1917–1993), Finnish footballer
- Thure Sjöstedt (1903–1956), Swedish wrestler
- Thure Svensson (1902–1988), Swedish footballer

== Writers ==
- Thure Essén (1914–1977), Swedish journalist
- Thure Edvard Höglund (1904–1970), Swedish journalist
- Thure Jansson (1886–1971), Swedish publisher
- Thure Erik Lund (born 1959), Norwegian author and cabinet maker
- Thure Malmberg (1938–2022), Swedish journalist
- Thure Sällberg (1854–1908), Swedish author
- Thure Stenström (born 1927), Swedish journalist

== Other ==
- Gustaf Thure Bielke (1762–1833), Swedish Army officer
- Thure Bielke (1869–1926), Swedish Army officer
- Thure Een (1837–1883), Swedish sailor
- Thure Mannerfelt (1911–1969), Swedish businessman
- Torsten Thure Renvall (1817–1898), Finnish archbishop
- Thure Gabriel Rudenschöld (1759–1839), Swedish real estate owner

== See also ==
- Brian Thure (born 1973), American football player
- Ture
