= Arne Isacsson =

Swedish artist (1917–2010)

- Born: 21 March 1917; Ronneby, Blekinge County, Sweden
- Died: 25 September 2010 (aged 93); Gerlesborg, Bohuslän, Sweden
- Resting place: Laxarby Cemetery
- Occupations: Watercolour painter, educator
- Known for: Founding the Gerlesborg School of Fine Art
- Spouses: Kerstin Renqvist (m. 1947; div. 1958) Mona Dan-Bergman (m. 1958; div. 1965) Margareta Blomberg (m. 1966–2010)
- Children: Magnus Isacsson

Arne Isacsson (21 March 1917 – 25 September 2010) was one of Sweden's most famous watercolour artists and art educators. He was also an author and professor and founded the Gerlesborg School of Fine Art in 1944. Isacsson's well-represented oeuvre explored, among other things, the properties of colour pigments in large amounts of water.

== Biography ==
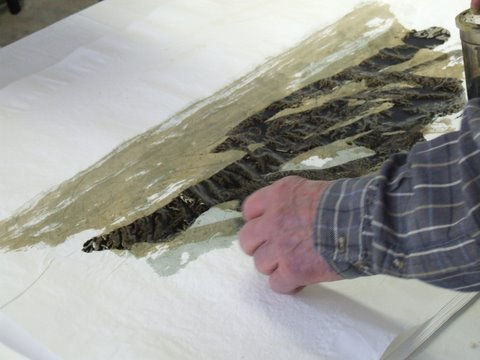
Isacsson demonstrating watercolour monotyping, 2006.

Arne Isacsson was born in Ronneby, Sweden. His grandparents had emigrated from Dalsland to South Bend, Indiana, United States, but returned in the late 19th century. His father enlisted, but had returned to work as a mill worker in Ronneby at the time of Isacsson's birth. A few years later, the family moved to Södermalm in Stockholm and in 1930 to Gothenburg, where Isacsson graduated in 1935.

He was a student of artist Otte Sköld from 1944 to 1946. Isacsson spent his summers in Dalsland, where he came into contact with the artists Georg Suttner and Algot Galle. Together with Carleinar Tellwe and Lizzie Olsson-Arle they formed the Bengtsfors Group.

Isacsson was the originator of the watercolour monotyping technique and used it, among other things, in collages that were laminated between panes of glass. He is represented at the Nationalmuseum with a portrait of Vilhelm Moberg, the National Portrait Gallery at Gripsholm, the Swedish Parliament, the Centre Culturel Suédois in Paris, the Gothenburg Museum of Art, and more. Isacsson also collaborated with sculptor Pål Svensson on the sculptures Pålarne in Fjällbacka and Sote märke in Kungshamn.

Isacsson was the founder of the Gerlesborg School of Fine Art in Gerlesborg (1944), eventually with branches in Stockholm (1948) and Provence (1958), and was appointed professor of watercolour technique in 1983. He is the author of several books on watercolour techniques.

In 2004 the biography Arne Isacsson: nedslag i ett konstnärskap by Gertrud Gidlund and Göran Gustafsson was published. In 2008, a lavishly illustrated licentiate thesis was published: Arne Isacsson – konstnär pedagog folkbildare by Anita Midbjer at Umeå University.

Isacsson was married from 1947 to 1958 to teacher Kerstin Renqvist (1922–2009), sister of artist Torsten Renqvist; from 1958 to 1965 to actress Mona Dan-Bergman (1927–1992); and from 1966 until his death to artist Margareta Blomberg (born 1943). His children include Swedish-Canadian filmmaker Magnus Isacsson (1948–2012) from his first marriage. Arne Isacsson died in 2010 in Gerlesborg and is buried at Laxarby Cemetery.

== Awards ==
In 1970 Isacsson received the Svea Life Guards' merit badge from King Gustaf VI Adolf. He was awarded the Illis Quorum medal and the Dalslandsmedaljen in 1999. He received an honorary doctorate from Umeå University in 2004.

== Bibliography ==
- Akvarell: en handbok (in Swedish). Stockholm: Wahlström & Widstrand. 1982. ISBN 9789146141587.
- Olja: en handbok i oljemålning (in Swedish). Björn Hallström and Georg Suttner. Stockholm: Wahlström & Widstrand. 1986. ISBN 9789146148739.
- Berg i Bohuslän (in Swedish). Partille: Warne. 1991. ISBN 9789186424480.
- Akvarellteknik (in Swedish). Stockholm: Wahlström & Widstrand. 2000. ISBN 9789146175605.

== Works represented at ==
- Nationalmuseum
- National Portrait Gallery at Gripsholm
- State Art Council
- Gothenburg Museum of Art
- Museum of Bohuslän
- Dalsland Art Museum
- Centre Culturel Suédois in Paris
- Nordic Watercolour Museum
