= Murder of Wilma Andersson =

2019 murder in Uddevalla, Sweden

- Native name: Fallet Wilma Andersson
- Date: November 14, 2019
- Location: Uddevalla, Sweden
- Type: Murder
- Perpetrator: Tishko Ahmed Shabaz
- Outcome: Conviction of perpetrator
- Deaths: 1
- Arrests: 1
- Convicted: Tishko Ahmed Shabaz
- Charges: Murder, desecration of a corpse (brott mot griftefriden)
- Trial: May–June 2020
- Verdict: Guilty
- Convictions: Murder, desecration of a corpse
- Sentence: 18 years (reduced from life imprisonment)
- Litigation: Damages of 227,664 SEK ordered to Andersson's family
- The victim's body, except for her head, has not been found as of 2025.

Wilma Andersson was murdered by Tishko Ahmed Sherzad, her Iraqi-Kurdish boyfriend, in November 2019 in Uddevalla, Sweden. Her boyfriend was arrested in his absence on December 3rd 2019, and was later apprehended on December 4th.

== Disappearance and search ==
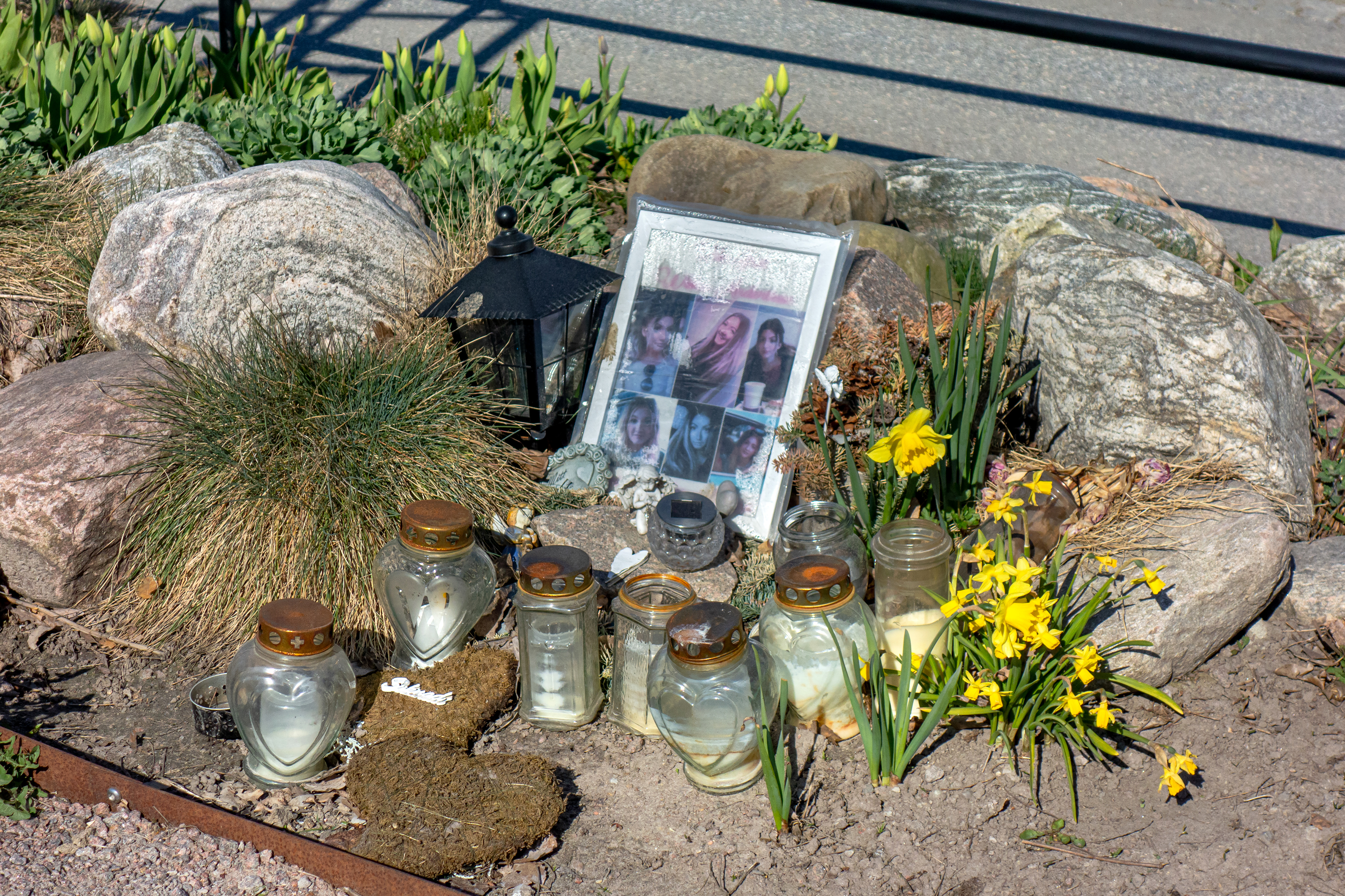
Temporary memorial for Wilma Andersson in Brastad, Lysekil Municipality

Andersson, 17 years old, went missing Thursday November 14 but at the time there was no indication of a crime. A search was commenced and her shoes and eyeglasses were found the following Tuesday night. Later in the day her boyfriend was apprehended as a manslaughter suspect. The following Wednesday a search was conducted in Ljungskile south of Uddevalla.

Late November, police authorities received help from the Swedish armed forces who aided the search for her body with divers and a mini submarine.

On November 28, her severed head was found in the boyfriend's bedroom.

By December, three weeks later, more than 5000 people had taken part in the search for her body which was missing.

== Trial ==
In May 2020, her 23-year-old boyfriend was charged with her murder and with the crime of desecrating by mutilation Wilma Andersson's dead body (Swedish: brott mot griftefriden). In the prosecutor's file it is stated he had beheaded his girlfriend and kept her head wrapped in plastic in a trolley. He pleaded not guilty to the charges, in spite of overwhelming evidence. At the time of prosecution, Andersson's body had not been found and therefore a cause of death could not be established.

In mid July, the Swedish National Board of Forensic Medicine found that the accused did not suffer from a serious or invalidating mental illness, but rather showed what experts have described as narcissistic personality traits, ascribable to a narcissistic personality disorder, epitomized by a grandiose, inflated self which according to the psychiatric evaluation is neither consistent with what Tishko Ahmed Shabaz actually has accomplished throughout his life nor in line with factual reality and its objective perception. According to the examination, the defendant displayed as well a shallow and flat range of emotions, other than a remarkable lack of empathy.

During the trial, the accused denied guilt in her death.

July 27 he was found guilty in Uddevalla District Court (Swedish: tingsrätt) of murder as well as violating the victim's corpse and named as Tishko Ahmed Shabaz. He was sentenced to life in prison. The convict was also ordered to pay 227 664 SEK in damages (about 22 thousand euro) to Andersson's family. The convict continued to deny the accusations after the conclusion of the trial.

=== Appeals court ===
The Court of Appeal for Western Sweden lowered the sentence for Ahmed from life in prison to a prison term of 18 years. In practice the sentence is subject to the Swedish legal system which by default releases convicts early after two thirds of the prison term. Ahmed continued to maintain his innocence despite remains of the victim being found in his closet.

== Perpetrator ==
Tishko Ahmed Sherzad was born January 22, 1997, in Sulaymaniyah, Iraq, to a Kurdish family, and was 9 years old when he came to Sweden with his father in 2006. Ahmed obtained Swedish citizenship in 2014 and lived in Uddevalla during his stay in Sweden.

== Media ==
Public service broadcaster SVT did not publish the name of the perpetrator after the trial concluded, saying it was not "indisputably in public interest" and that publishing name or picture of the perpetrator would not create understanding on why this serious crime had been carried out. SVT published the name and picture of the 17-year-old female victim.
