= Egor G. Kraft =

Russian artist (born 1986)

Egor (Georgie) Kraft
- Егор Крафт
- Born: 1986 (age 39–40); Leningrad, USSR
- Education: Gerlesborg School of Fine Art (2008); Rodchenko School (2011); Academy of Fine Arts Vienna (2014); Central Saint Martins; Strelka Institute; Tokyo University of the Arts
- Occupations: artist, art-based researcher
- Notable work: Content Aware Studies
- Awards: New Technological Art Award (2022), Lumen Prize (2023)
- Website: kraft.studio

Egor (Georgie) Kraft (born 1986, in Leningrad) is an interdisciplinary artist and art-based researcher.

== Biography ==
Kraft was born in Leningrad, USSR, in 1986. His lifelong learning included numerous art schools in Europe and abroad: the Gerlesborg School of Fine Art (Sweden), Rodchenko School (Russia), Academy of Fine Arts Vienna (Austria), Central Saint Martins (UK), Strelka Institute (Russia), and Tokyo University of the Arts (Japan). He participated in Strelka's The New Normal' postgraduate program and think tank, was a research fellow at the University of Southampton (through the EU's S+T+ARTS programme), and a lecturer at the Kunstuniversität Linz. By the mid-2020s, Kraft lived a highly mobile life with studios in Vienna and Tokyo, but retained ties to London and Berlin.

Kraft's artistic practice is formed by technology, computer science, media, critical design, and philosophy, which fuel art-based research, speculative narratives, and artistic interventions. Kraft’s works address the modern world as the outcome of technological and social, informational and material, and econometric self-organizing and self-optimising dynamics. Kraft’s research-driven practice includes thought and physical objects, AI models, films, essays, hardware and software, artistic investigative enquires, hacktivist interventions, speculative proposals, and more. Kraft is often cited among the early wave of artists who works critically and conceptually with AI.

== Artistic works ==
A part of the words.works project, 2010

Over his artistic career, Kraft moved from physical objects to digital interventions and established a balance between the computational art and real-world objects. In the To Say It project (2008—), Kraft used large-format print media for a number of metatextual public space interventions. Within the series of artistic interventions Kickback (2015–2018), Kraft purchased blank tees from the fast fashion chains, added professional-grade printed statements mocking consumerism, and returning items to stores only to find them displayed on the most appealing spaces the day after. The project also ironized on the commercialization of actionist art, provocative by nature, but easily commodified (which is essentially the matter it often protests against).

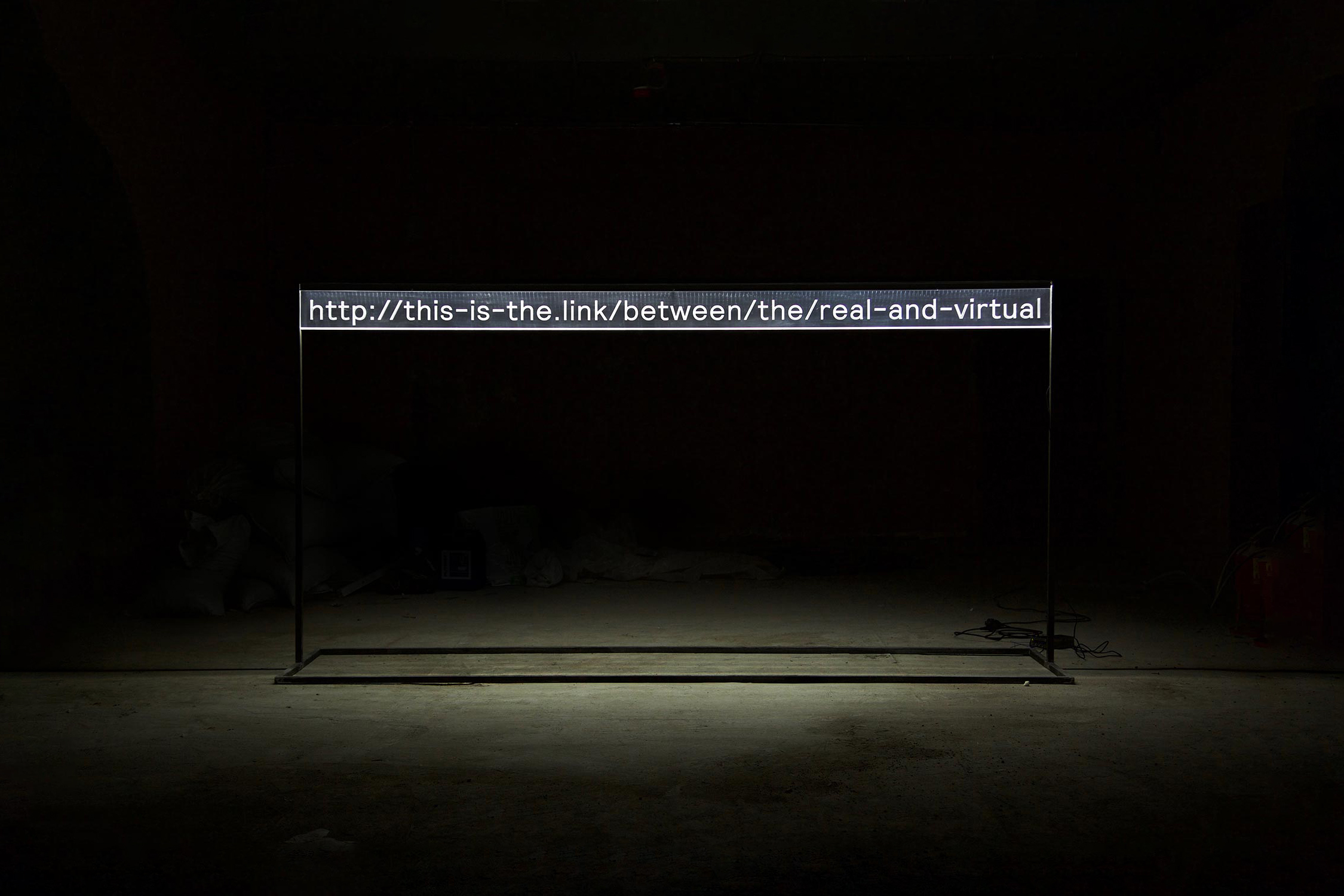
The Link at the Art-Project exhibition in Saint Petersburg, 2016

The New Color (2011—) is an ongoing mystification that consists of a faux website www.thenewcolor.net, ads, and mockumentary interviews for a non-existent US chemical company that allegedly discovered a previously unknown color that can't be experienced through modern digital means. This carnivalesque trick eventually attracted lots of real people eager to receive samples of the new color or invest into the invention. Other post-Internet objects created by Kraft are the URL Stone and The Link (both 2015). The former is an ongoing experiment to study if ancient or contemporary medium better stands the test of time: a URL address carved on a marble plaque leads to the photo of the same plaque uploaded to Wikimedia Commons. The latter is a feedback loop between the real exhibition space and its virtual counterpart created by a luminous hyperlink http://this-is-the.link/between/the/real-and-virtual which leads to a streamed 360° panorama of that location.

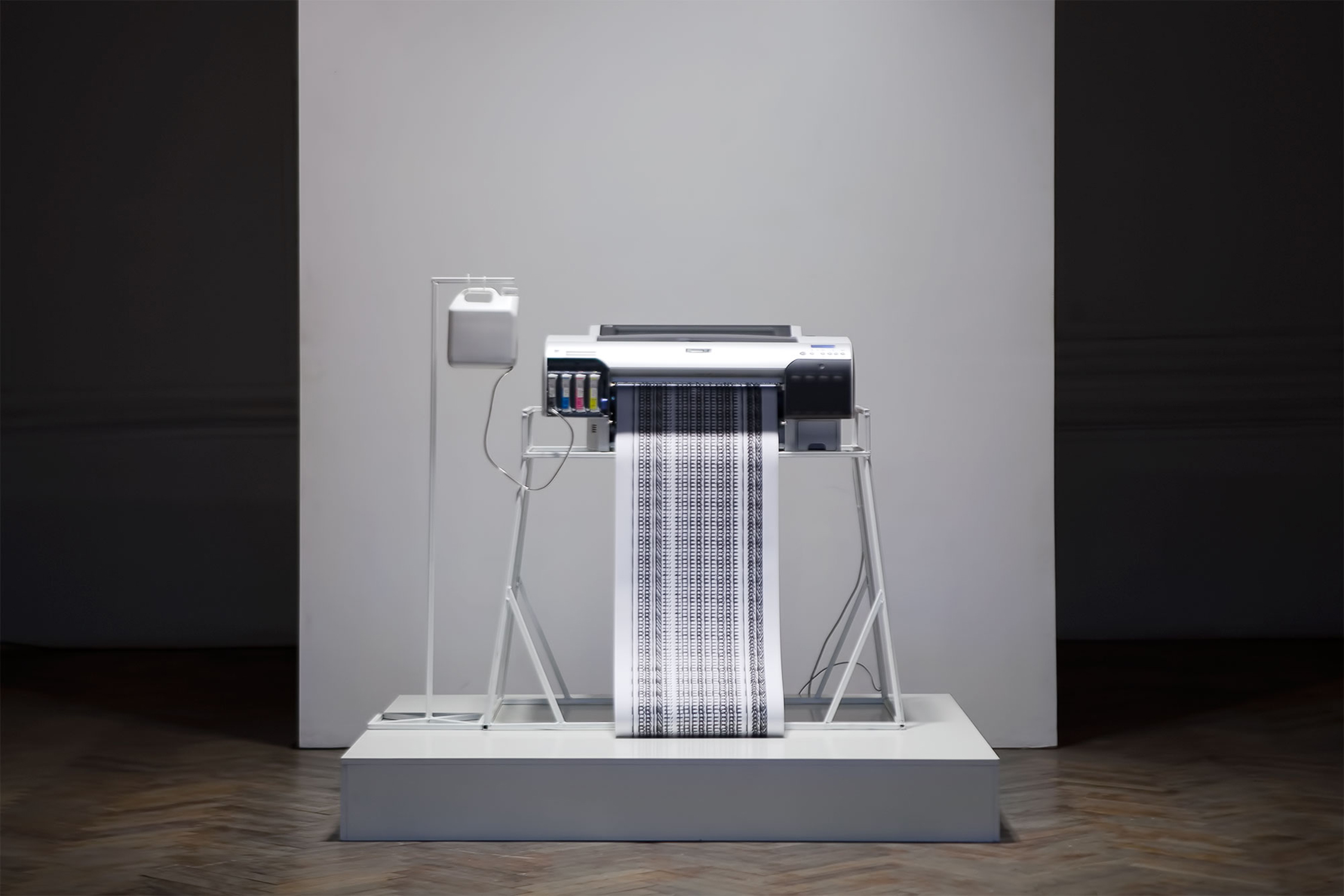
I Print Therefore, I Am project at Manifesta 10

The Printed Matter (2015) project consisted of a wide-format printer instructed to continuously manifest its existence on a looped sheet of paper by reproducing the line of text I print, therefore I am (a reference to the first principle of René Descartes' philosophy). The project was nominated for a 2019 Kandinsky Prize. The Air Kiss (2018) film was created as a part of his postgraduate studies in Strelka Institute to speculate about a possible 2050 Moscow where the governance was largely automated and handled over to an AI. The Chinese Ink (2018) installation used e-ink screens to stream real-time outputs of a computational model trained on images of inkblots splashed on watercolor paper and tasked to create algorithmically unique copies. The project was inspired by Chinese ink painting techniques and reflected on how traditions survive and change with technological advancements.

One & Infinite Chairs by Egor Kraft, 2023

Following the 2022 Russia's invasion of Ukraine, Kraft presented several technical and tactical proposals addressing common wartime censorship, propaganda and misinformation tactics. Uncensored Architecture proposed the use of blockchain technology to distribute banned journalist archives over thousands of individual nodes. The Hashd0x | Proof of War project combined a highly programmable hardware camera compatible with telephoto optics, a mobile app, and a series of smart contracts to issue and automatically register tamper-proof digital watermarks, or as author titles them ‘hashmarks' for images or videos, which could provide a toolkit for professional and citizen journalists in documenting sensitive content, including war crimes. This project was awarded the 2023 Lumen Prize.

=== Content Aware Studies ===
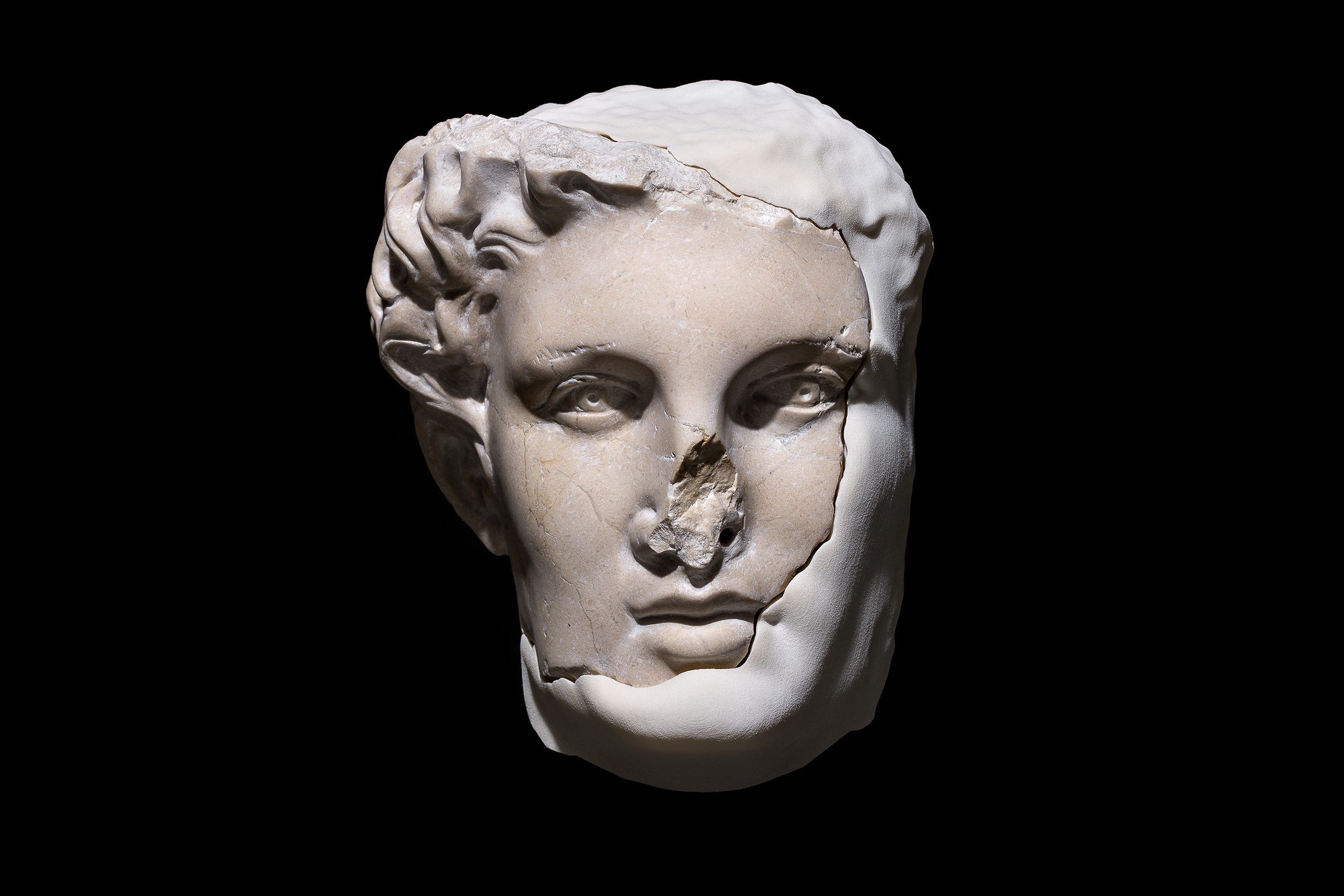
Part of the Content Aware Studies project, 2018

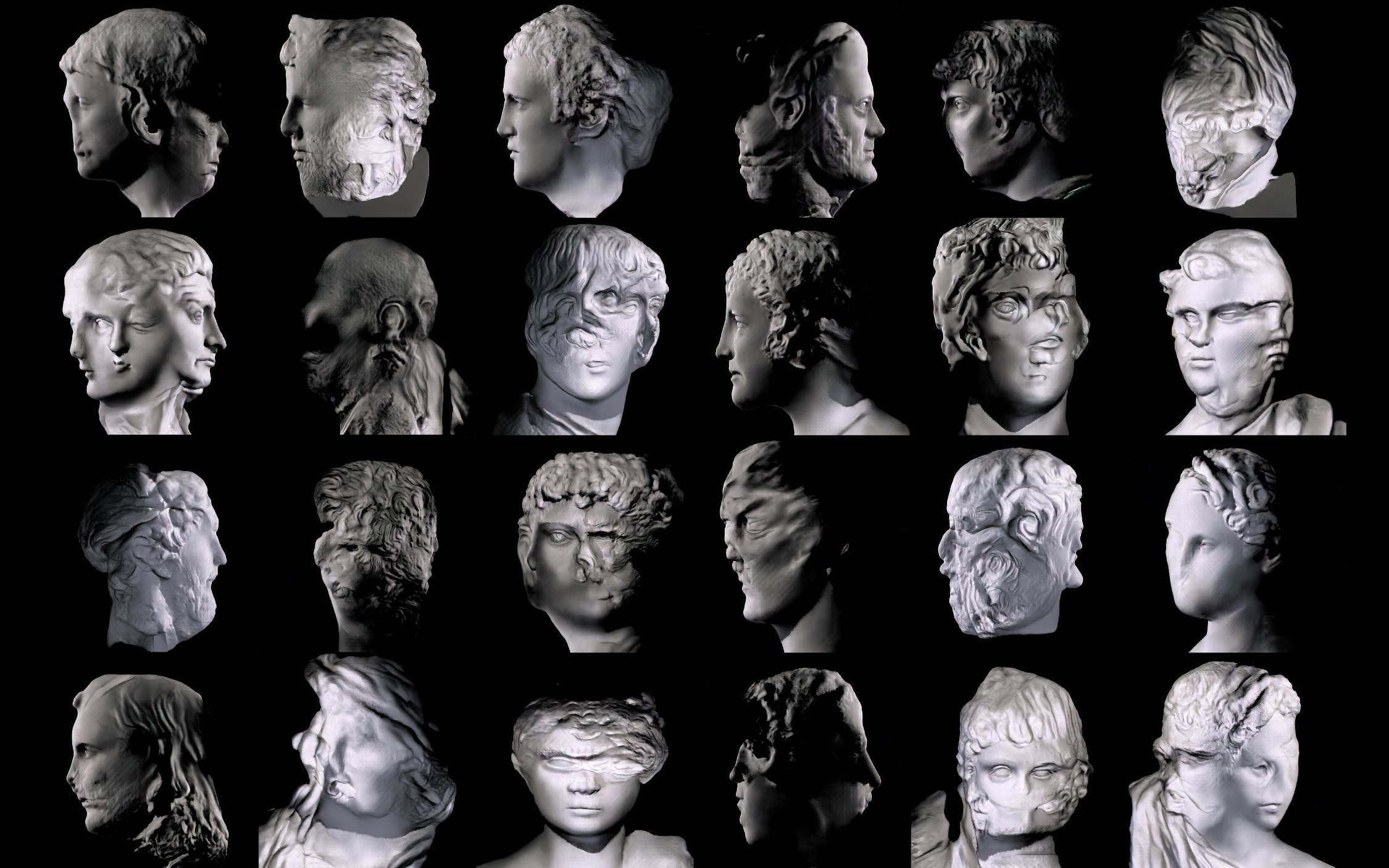
Artifacts created within the Content Aware Studies project, 2018

Solo exhibition at alexander levy Gallery, Berlin, 2019

Artificial intelligence was Kraft's recurring topic since the mid-2010s. His long-lasting project Content Aware Studies (2018—) is a long-lasting project that employs various custom trained Ai models and technics as means to recreate lost parts of the historical artifacts, including Classical marble busts and reliefs, and paleontological documents of natural history.

The AI model was trained on thousands of 3D models of artifacts from the British Museum, Metropolitan Museum, National Roman Museum, and other museums, and tasked to fill the voids in the sculptures. Kraft printed the proposed elements in synthetic materials and combined them with the originals.

The outcomes of algorithmic generation were sometimes pertinent, but often eerie: the faithful authenticity was combined with bizarre errors, such as lack of facial features, extra heads, additional eyes on skull, or an extra mouth on the neck.

Kraft allowed his algorithmically faithful artificial contributor to generate possibilities unseen before rather than scientifically accurate authoritative pieces (the actually missing ones).

== Publications ==
- "Content Aware Studies I. Synthetic Historiography". Paper for International Symposium on Machine Learning and Art. Hong Kong. 2002.
- "Content Aware Studies II. Museum of Synthetic History". Proceedings for Politics of the Machines conference. Berlin. 2021.
- "Cyberdolia. Chihuahuas, Woodgrain Patterns, Cupcakes and Machine Vision". Moscow Art Magazine (127). 2025.
- "The Aura Protocol". Investigating Decentralized Action in Art. Baltan Laboratories. 2024.

== Exhibitions ==
The World According to AI exhibition space, Jeu de Paume, Paris, 2025

Kraft's works were exhibited in major museums and art institutions, such as the State Hermitage museum (Innovation as an Artistic Technique, 2018), Saint Petersburg Stieglitz State Academy of Art and Design (Weather Forecast: Digital Cloudiness, 2018), ZKM Center for Art and Media Karlsruhe (Negative Space. Trajectories of Sculpture, 2019), MAXXI (Italy), Alexander S. Onassis Foundation (Greece), Espacio Fundación Telefónica (Spain), iMAL (Belgium), Jeu de Paume (The World According to AI, 2025), Zeppelin Museum Friedrichshafen (Cryptomania, 2023), MMOMA, MAMM, PERMM, Tretyakov Gallery, and the Polytechnic Museum.

He participated in biennials, festivals, and art shows, including Ars Electronica (Austria), Impakt Festival (Netherlands), WRO Biennale (Poland), Moscow International Biennale for Young Art (Russia), The 5th Ural Industrial Biennale (Russia), The European Fine Art Fair (Netherlands), Vienna Contemporary (Austria), Manifesta X (Russia), WRONG Biennale, Kyiv Biennale (Ukraine), Beijing International Art Biennale (China), Hong Kong International AI Art Festival.

=== Solo shows ===
- 2014 — Wanderings — Rundum, Tallinn, Estonia.
- 2018 — Ákkta, Anna Nova Gallery, St. Petersburg.
- 2019 — Content Award Studies, Alexander Levy Gallery, Berlin
- 2019 — Printed Matter, Museum of Print, Saint Petersburg.
- 2022 — Lies, Half-Truths & Propaganda [The Bad, the Worse, and the Worst]
- 2024 — Engineering Truth, Art Center Ongoing, Tokyo, Japan.

== Collections ==
Kraft's works are the part of institutional collections of Multimedia Art Museum, Moscow, Kuryokhin Center (Russia), Colección Solo (Spain), ZKM Center for Art and Media Karlsruhe (Germany), Ripley's (USA), Cyland Video Archive (USA), and personal collections.

== Awards ==
The New Technological Art Award, group exhibition, Zebrastraat, Ghent, 2021

In 2017, he was included in the New East 100, a list of people and projects shaping the world today by Calvert Journal. In 2020, The Art Newspaper listed him among the most prominent artists of Russian origin.

Kraft was the finalist of the 2021 Re:Humanism Art Prize (Italy), the 2022 Austrian Blockchain Award and the Jury Award at the New Technological Art Award (Belgium), the 2023 Lumen Prize (UK), the 2024 Falling Walls Science Summit Award (Germany). He was awarded the 2019 Garage Arts and Technology grant, S+T+ARTS residency and a S+T+ARTS Prize honorary mention (EU). Previously, he was shortlisted for the Kandinsky Prize and Innovation Prize, the Sergey Kuryokhin Contemporary Art Award (Young Artist of the Year), the Creative Enterprise Award by the University of the Arts London, and Pulsar The Open Art Prize.
