= Gerlesborg School of Fine Art =

Art school in Gerlesborg, Sweden

Coordinates: 58.48876°N 11.34161°E

The Gerlesborg School of Fine Art (Swedish: Gerlesborgsskolan) is an art school located in the village of Gerlesborg, south of Hamburgsund in Tanum Municipality, Bohuslän, Sweden. The school also has a branch in Stockholm and holds courses in Provence, France.

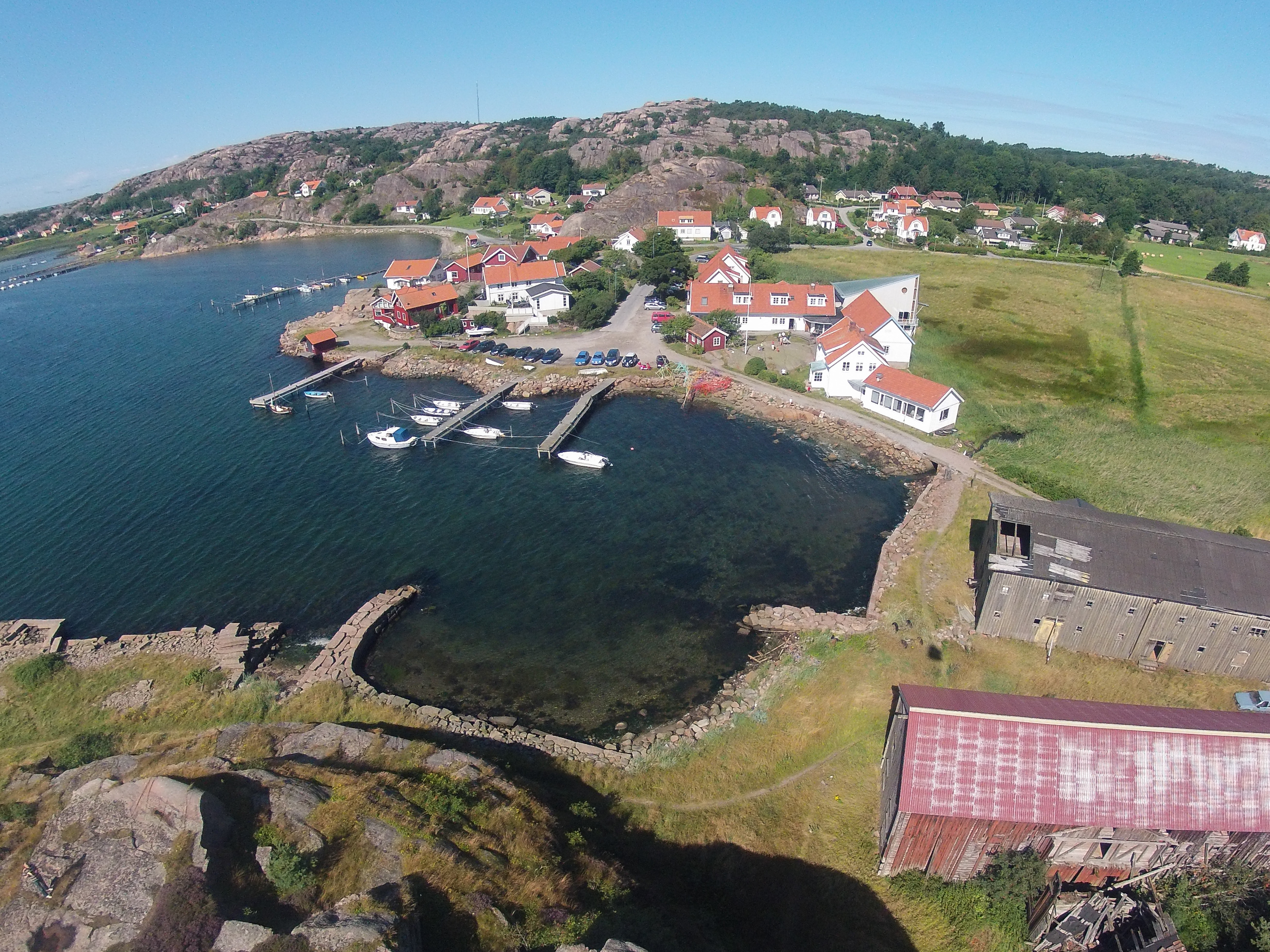
Gerlesborg

== History ==
The Gerlesborg School of Fine Art was founded in 1944 by the painter Arne Isacsson. Hans Fromén, art historian, and Jöran Salmson, artist, were also teachers at that time. The activities grew fast and Isacsson and Fromén bought the boarding-house in Gerlesborg. In 1948, the college had its first course in Provence, France, in collaboration with Georg Suttner.

At the beginning of the 1950s, the college was really established and the basis of the currently important artistic and cultural centre was laid, both nationally and internationally. The contacts with musicians, composers, authors and performing artists were increased.

In 1958, the Gerlesborg School of Fine Art in Stockholm was founded. The head teachers were Georg Suttner and Staffan Hallström. From autumn 1993, the college is housed in the building of a former elementary school in the district of Hjorthagen.

In 1963, the Gerlesborg School of Fine Art Foundation was constituted and was allowed government subsidy. In 1969, at the schools 25-year anniversary, it was considered the largest free art college in Scandinavia.

== Notable alumni ==
- Lennart Rodhe
- Palle Parnevi
- Staffan Hallström
- Vera Nilsson
- Arne Cassel
- Torsten Bergmark
- Per Lindecrantz
- Evert Lundquist
- Torsten Renqvist
- Peter Dahl
- Lars Lerin
- Inger Wihl
- Margareta Blomberg
- Lars Andreasson
- Anna Odell
- Eva Logell Wendel
- Egor Kraft
