= Museum of Bohuslän =

Museum in Sweden

Coordinates: 58.3493°N 11.9278°E

The Museum of Bohuslän (2023)

The Museum of Bohuslän is a museum in the Swedish province of Bohuslän, established in Uddevalla in 1863.

Elsa Garmann Andersen's collection of Street photography is classified in this museum.
