= Edvard Fredin =

Swedish translator and actor

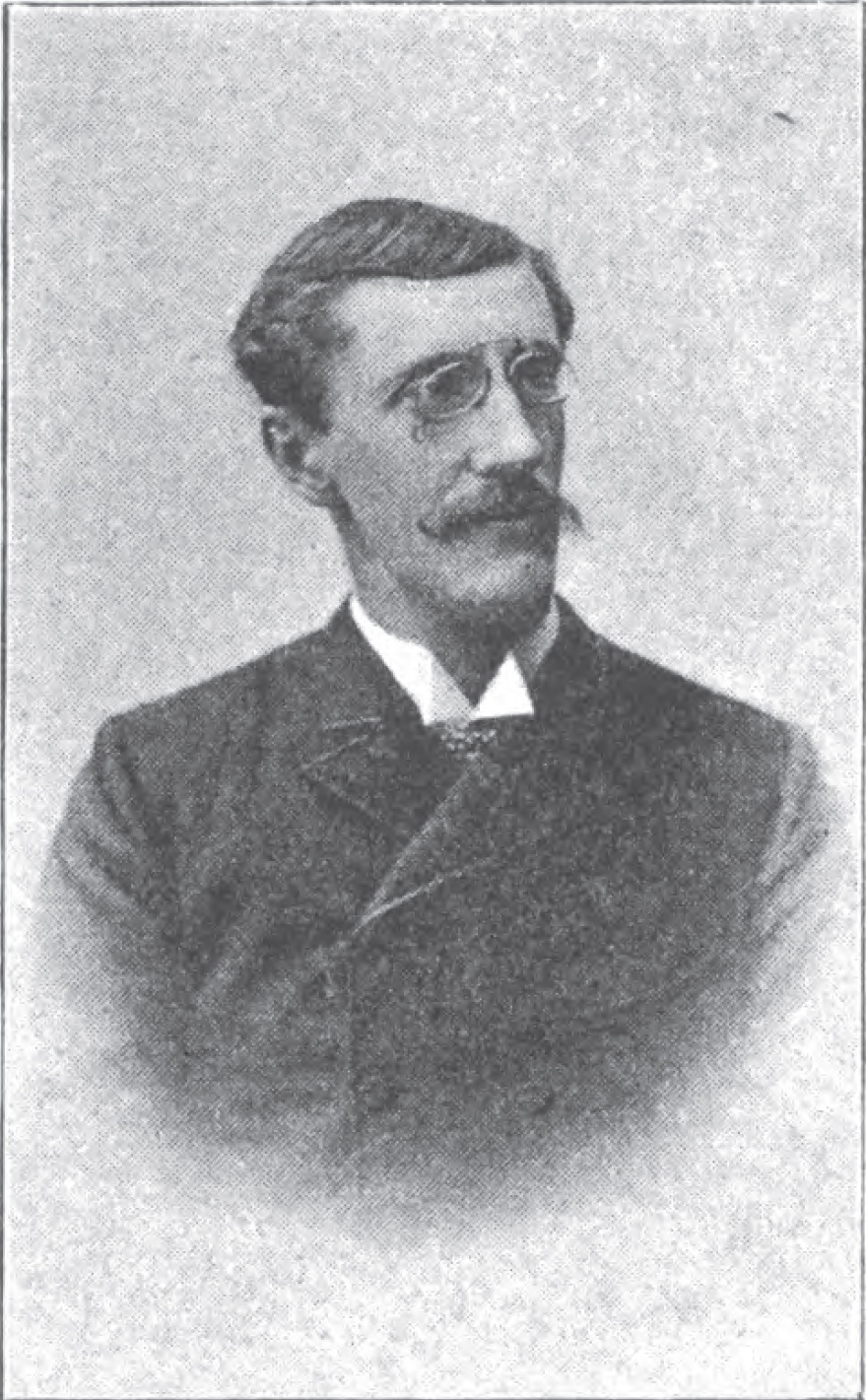
Edvard Fredin

Nils Edvard Fredin (8 June 1857 – 27 June 1889) was a Swedish playwright, actor, reviewer, and translator.

== Biography ==
Nils Edvard Fredin, who used the name Edvard, was born in Stockholm in 1857. The child of an administrator, he was quite sick as a child and quit school during the fifth grade. He continued to study privately, but never learned a trade. He began writing poems as a child, stating that he wished to be a poet. He gained early notoriety as a translator of poems, many of which are collected in a book Skilda stämmor ("different voices"), published in 1884.

He was awarded the "Big Prize" of the Swedish Academy in 1888 for Vår Daniel ("our Daniel"), a poetic cycle about the march of the minister Daniel Buskovius from Mora to Särna in 1644 with a company of soldiers, taking over the city of Särna without bloodshed.

In 1889 Fredin translated the Marseillaise into Swedish. His most famous translation is, however, the Nyårsklockan (New Year's Bells), a loose translation published posthumously in 1890 of Alfred, Lord Tennyson's "Ring Out, Wild Bells" into Swedish. The poem is read aloud at the Skansen museum in Stockholm every year and broadcast by TV and radio.

Fredin never married, and died in Södertälje, he is buried outside of Stockholm at the North Cemetery. Two books of his poems were published after his death.

== Bibliography ==
- Arbete : dikt. Stockholm: Bille. 1883.
- Biltog : drama i fem handlingar. Stockholm: Bonnier. 1890.
- Vår Daniel och andra dikter. Stockholm: Bille. 1889. With J. A. Runström.
- Om Jerfsö kyrka och hennes reparation : Historik och upplysn:r. 1889-1895: Falun. 1889–1895.
- Efterlemnade dikter. Stockholm: Bonnier. 1890.
- Stjärnornas mystik : posthuma dikter. Stockholm: Fröken Anna Fredin. 1920.
- Över Golgata. Robin Hood serien, 99-2022701-3. Haparanda: Daisy. 1993. Libris länk. ISBN 91-971713-2-8
