= Tureholm, Sweden =

Tureholm
- Location within Stockholm Location within Sweden
- Coordinates: 59°19′N 17°43′E
- Country: Sweden
- Province: Uppland
- County: Stockholm County
- Municipality: Ekerö Municipality

Area
  - Total: 0.95 km^{2} (0.37 sq mi)

Population (31 December 2020)
  - Total: 1,097
  - Density: 1,200/km^{2} (3,000/sq mi)
- Time zone: UTC+1 (CET)
  - Summer (DST): UTC+2 (CEST)

Tureholm is a locality situated in Ekerö Municipality, Stockholm County, Sweden, with 260 inhabitants in 2010.
