= Bäveån =

Coordinates: 58°21′N 11°55′E

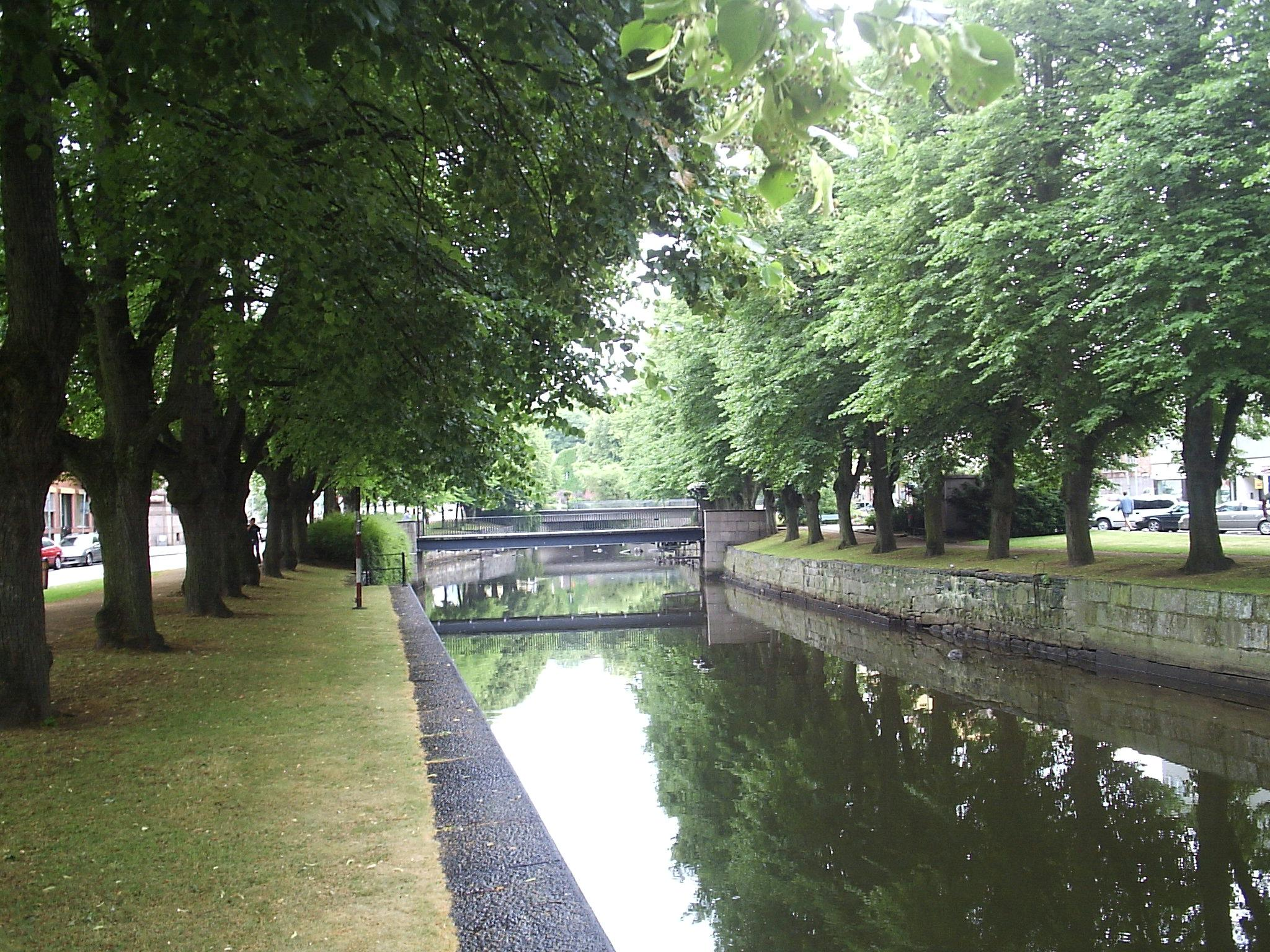

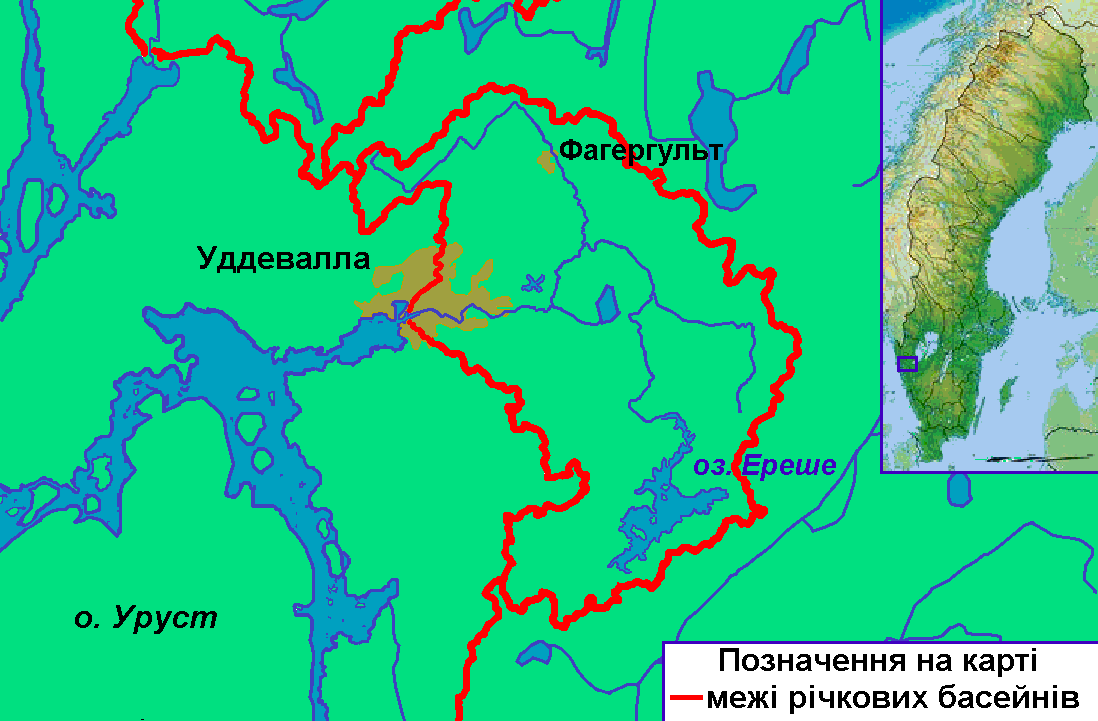
- Map of Bäveån's drainage basin.

Location
- Country: Sweden
- County: Västra Götaland

Physical characteristics
- Basin size: 300.6 km^{2} (116.1 sq mi)

Bäveån is a river in Uddevalla Municipality, Sweden. It starts by flowing northwest from Mjövattnet, a lake on Herrestadsfjället. It then takes a sharp turn to the south and flows through Fagerhult, Lane, Lane-Ryr and Uddevalla before opening up into Byfjorden. It passes under County Road 172 in Fagerhult, National Road 44 and the Älvsborg Line in Kuröd industrial area, as well as the Bohus Line near Agnebergsskolan in central Uddevalla.
