= Ture Malmgren =

Swedish journalist and politician (1851–1922)

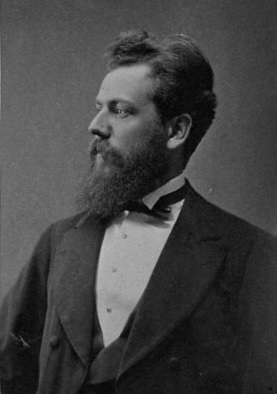
- Ture Malmgren
- Born: Ture Robert Ferdinand Malmgren; 7 June 1851; Uddevalla, Bohuslän, Sweden
- Died: 3 August 1922 (aged 71)
- Occupations: Journalist, publisher, politician

Ture Robert Ferdinand Malmgren (7 June 1851 – 3 August 1922) was a Swedish journalist, book publisher, and municipal politician. A prominent figure in his hometown of Uddevalla, Malmgren became a colorful and well-known part of the city's history through, among other things, his long-lasting ownership of the newspaper Bohusläningen (The Bahusian), work in the local political scene, eccentric and extravagant lifestyle, and faux-medieval Tureborg Castle.

== Early life ==
Born in Uddevalla in 1851, during the time of the Union between Sweden and Norway, he was the son of Anna Cajsa Kruse and Carl Gabriel Malmgren, a local book publisher and owner of Bohus Läns Tidning, the first newspaper native to Uddevalla. His father had taken control of the newspaper – previously named Uddewalla Weckoblad, and founded by the publisher Anders Johansson in 1826 – in 1843, bringing the publication into a new era of liberalism after a period of held-back conservatism. Growing up among printers and publisher, Ture developed an early interest in journalism – during his grammar school education, he achieved poor results in most subjects, but achieved the highest grade possible in "endeavor".

In his youth, Malmgren frequently traveled abroad, where he was inspired by the foreign political ideas of the time. The places he visited ranged from the Kingdom of Italy and the German Confederation (where his steamboat journeys on the Rhine would provide a significant inspiration in his later life), to the Australian colonies of the British Empire and the Pacific Islands.

In early 1878, Malmgren – aged 27 – founded Bohusläns Boktryckeri AB. By August the same year the publishing company had been established in a building owner by the skipper Bengtsson on the corner of the intersecting streets Norra Drottninggatan and Lilla Norrgatan, where the newspaper he soon founded would remain until 2013, a whole 135 years. In September he gained permission to publish Bohusläningen, covering Uddevalla, the province of Bohuslän, and south-western Dalsland. The first issue, a "test" issue, ran on 21 October, and was given out to households for free, followed by a second test issue. On Monday 4 November the hand-operated printing press was fully put into use.

== Career ==
For a brief period of time Malmgren's own father was his main competitor, before the elder Malmgren was outmaneuvered by Ivar Nelin, the new editor of Bohus Läns Tidning, who soon took full control of the publication. After briefly considering starting a third newspaper in the city, C. G. Malmgren joined his son's enterprise instead. Other early contributors to Bohusläningen included the physician R. V. Thorén and the poet August Ahlmenius. The newspaper was issued twice a week during the first years, in a four-page format. Other than editorials and news items, Malmgren wrote and published the feuilleton Under södra hemisferens himmel (English: "Under the sky of the southern hemisphere"), later printed in book form, a romanticized tale of his youthful adventures in the Pacific archipelagos and deserts of Australia, where he reportedly had panned gold. Bohusläningen soon became hugely successful, popular especially among the region's growing liberal and progressive milieu due to Malmgren's firm political editorial guidelines. Already on 10 February 1879, its biweekly issues outnumbered those of its competitor by over a hundred, despite low-quality printing equipment.

On 13 March 1882, Ture married Hilma Olsson, who he had become engaged to in 1881. Politically controversial with the local elite, Malmgren would go on to defeat any and all competitors. When Bohus Läns Tidning closed down in 1884, he purchased what was left of it at a bankruptcy auction, merging it with Bohusläningen. At the same time he bought out the other stock owners, becoming the newspaper's sole owner. He went on to continue the expansion, issuing papers every other day by 1885, and tying the prominent playwright and actor Edvard Fredin to the newspaper (although Fredin had to resign out of health concerns already in 1886). A conservative competitor appeared in 1887, in the form of Bohusläns Allehanda, but it didn't survive past 1891, leaving the region's "preservers of society" unable to make themselves heard against the "dissolving tendency" that, according to them, was the hallmark of the "terribly red" Malmgren. Other minor competitors posed no threat to the dominance of Bohusläningen, and were thoroughly ignored by Malmgren himself.

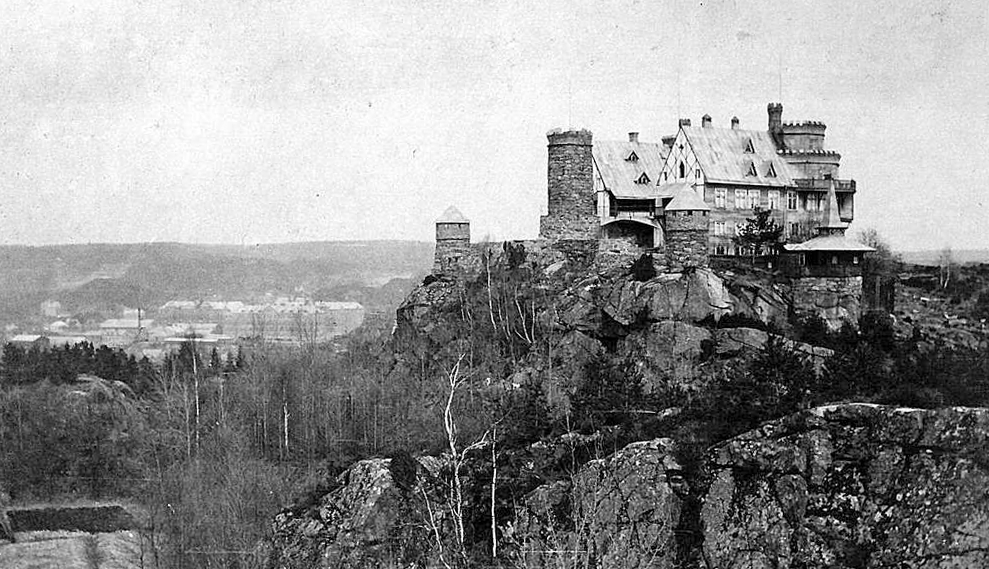
Tureborg Castle, ca. 1910–1925

During this time of journalistic expansionism, with an issue count doubling multiple times and new local editorial offices being founded, Malmgren acquired a significant fortune, the origin of which has been put into question. He set upon a number of extravagant building projects, sometimes together with and sometimes against the will of his wife Hilma, first of all Villa Elfkullen. The villa was, at the time of its creation in 1887, located in the city's rural outskirts. At first intended only as a Summer home, it was extravagantly decorated, and after an expansion in 1901–1902 interiors designed by the artist Vicke Andrén (famous for, among other pieces, ceiling paintings in the Royal Swedish Opera) were among the additions. Other new features included a pagoda-inspired "Chinese tower", a functioning drawbridge, and numerous secret compartments.

In 1899, he began construction on the grand Tureborg Castle, named after himself. The mock castle, inspired by his German voyages in his youth and located atop a hill overlooking Villa Elfkullen, was finished in 1912. It consisted of, among other things, almost forty different rooms, a great hall with rough stone pillars, several towers, balconies, and tall stone walls. Typical of Malmgren's style, a secret passage was included, activated by pressing a hidden button on a wooden panel. All this was built without the use of a proper set of blueprints, employing Rhine Valley postcards instead. Malmgren held many grand feasts inspired by the national romanticism of the time in the castle, featuring for example fully roasted pigs and mead served in wooden tankards. Suffering from strong herpetophobia, Malmgren saw himself forced to clear the site of his castle from snakes, paying 1 krona and 25 öre – the cost of a litre of brännvin at the time – to every local who could produce a dead reptile.

Politically engaged from the very beginning, and somewhat of a localist and regionalist, Malmgren was very active in the politics of Uddevalla Municipality. In 1890 he became the first chairman of Uddevalla Suffrage Association (Uddevalla rösträttsförening), the first predecessor of the developing Swedish labour movement in the city. Decades before the introduction of women's suffrage/universal suffrage in Sweden, Malmgren was a fierce proponent of it. Other measures he supported was the improvement of social care, increased compulsory education, shorter working time, and the introduction of state pensions for workers. He was sympathetic to the right to strike, "as we must admit that the strike at times has been the only means through which the workers have been able to procure justice." Also a staunch republican and opponent of the monarchy, he caused a minor scandal when Gustaf V came to visit Uddevalla on 31 August 1915 by first refusing to attend the King's inauguration of a statue depicting Charles X Gustav leading the March across the Belts during the Second Northern War, and – after being convinced to attend – leaving the ceremony early, ahead of the King's departure. After gradually retiring from the day-to-day business of his increasingly successful newspaper, he spent several years as Chairman of the Uddevalla City Assembly.

Malmgren was also active in a number of nonprofit organizations with more or less political purposes, among them theater groups, tree planting associations, and the massive temperance movement – at least until his candidacy for the movement's Chairmanship in Uddevalla failed, and he became an avid wine connoisseur instead.

== Death and legacy ==
Ture Malmgren died on 3 August 1922 at the age of 71, leaving behind his wife Hilma. The cause of death was a heart attack, after a prolonged period of diabetes. For the last six years of his life he had been unable to visit his castle, admiring it from afar instead. As the couple was childless, his entire fortune was willed to her, which caused a conflict with Malmgren's brother Axel. The dispute was resolved in Hilma's favor in June 1923. Going against his will, in which he asked to be buried in a cavern blown into the hill behind his home (see Tomb of Ture Malmgren), the municipality decided to bury Malmgren at the Eastern Cemetery (Swedish: Östra kyrkogården). Hilma, who never set her foot in Tureborg again after his death and spent the rest of her life in Villa Elfkullen, was buried beside him after her own demise in 1942. Their grave is marked by a massive tombstone, featuring a carved portrait of Ture.

Tureborg, rented out to various individuals by Hilma, gradually fell into disrepair. Villa Elfkullen also became increasingly decrepit after Hilma's death. In 1950, the castle burned to the ground, leaving behind a charred ruin, which today is one of Uddevalla's most well-known landmarks. Villa Elfkullen, on the other hand, was restored in 1980 after being threatened with demolition. It is cared for by Föreningen Villa Elfkullen (English: "the Villa Elfkullen Association"), which has approximately 400 members, and receives thousands of visitors annually. The building, which was given protected status in 2001, houses a large number of Malmgren's personal belongings, put on display.

The residential neighborhood in the vicinity of Villa Elfkullen and Tureborg Castle has been named Tureborg, in honor of Malmgren.

Bohusläningen remains one of the largest publications in the region, with a circulation of about 32 000, with six issues per week, as of 2014.
