= Uddevalla =

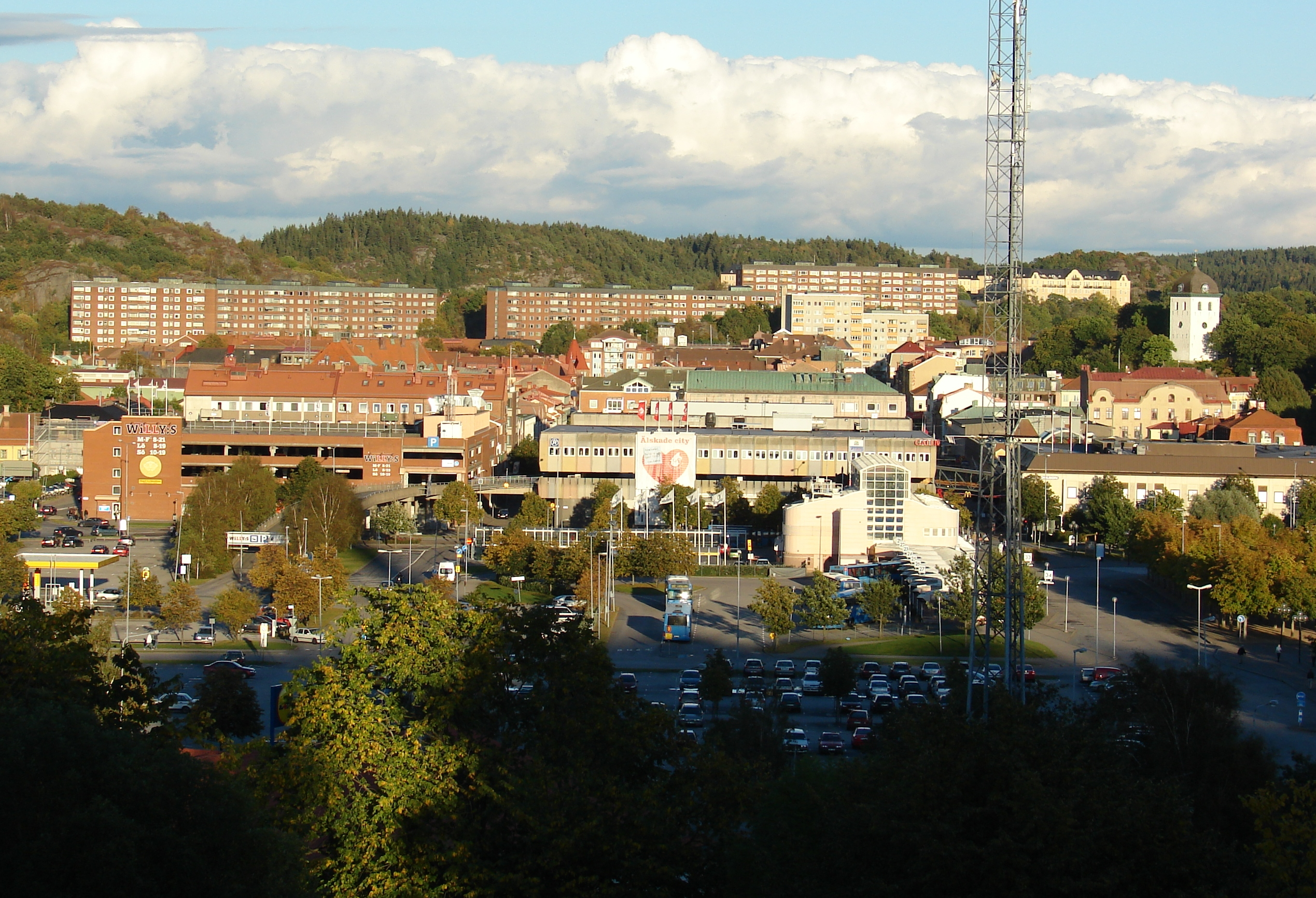
- Overlooking the centre of Uddevalla

- Location within Västra Götaland Location within Sweden
- Coordinates: 58°20′57″N 11°56′17″E
- Country: Sweden
- Province: Bohuslän
- County: Västra Götaland County
- Municipality: Uddevalla Municipality

Area
  - Total: 16.92 km^{2} (6.53 sq mi)

Population (31 December 2015)
  - Total: 34 781
  - Density: 1,845/km^{2} (4,780/sq mi)
- Time zone: UTC+1 (CET)
  - Summer (DST): UTC+2 (CEST)

Uddevalla is a town in Västra Götaland County, Sweden. It's the seat of Uddevalla Municipality. In 2015, it had a population of 34,781, making it the largest town fully in Bohuslän. Uddevalla is located where the river Bäveån opens up into Byfjorden, a fjord in the south-eastern part of Skagerrak.

The beaches of Uddevalla are filled with seashells and Uddevalla has one of the largest shell-banks in the world. Uddevalla also has a port that once was a large shipyard, the Uddevallavarvet ("Uddevalla wharf"), which was the largest employer in Bohuslän during the 1960s.

== History ==
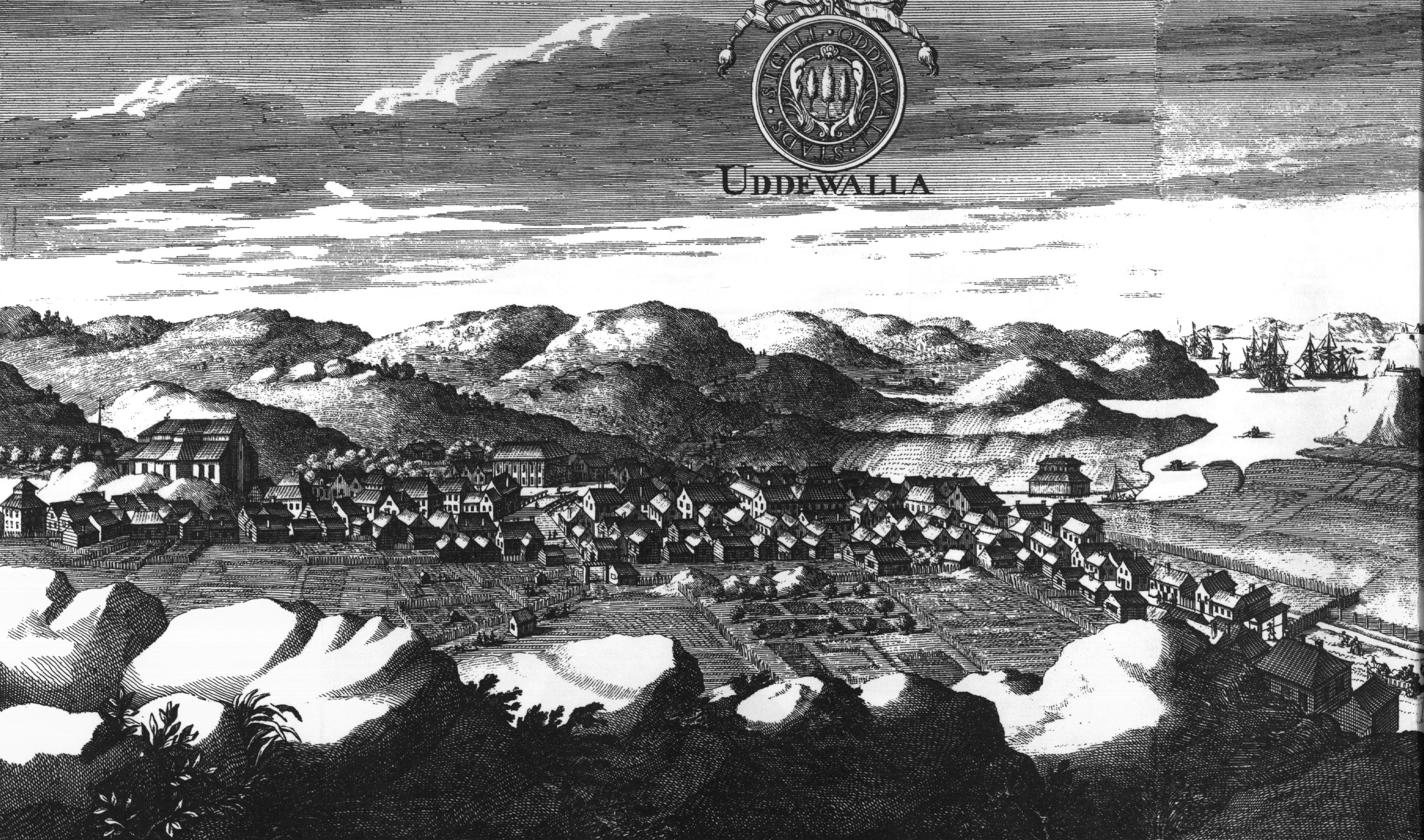
Uddevalla around 1700, from the Suecia Antiqua et Hodierna

Uddevalla originally belonged to Norway and received its town privileges in 1498. It's probable that the town was founded some time before that, but we have no proof about that. The Norwegians originally named the city "Oddevald", which later became "Oddevold".

Due to the town's former proximity to Denmark and Sweden, as well as its strategic position, there were many wars in and around Oddevold. Oddevold has changed nationalities a total of seven times throughout its history. In 1658, Oddevold (and the rest of Bohuslän) was handed to Sweden as part of the Treaty of Roskilde. Norway invaded the city a year later before it was handed back as part of the Treaty of Copenhagen 1660. That was the last time Oddevold changed nationality and it was soon thereafter renamed to Uddevalla. The old name remains today in the form of IK Oddevold, the local football team.

=== City fires ===
Uddevalla has been burned to the ground a total of six times. The first five times were attempts to claim the city by the different Scandinavian nations. After the fifth fire in 1690, the town was rebuilt and became larger than it ever was. Uddevalla was the 5th largest city in Sweden when the sixth great fire started in 1806. The small fire which started in a barn spread quickly and burnt down the entire city. Only a few houses located in the city outskirts remained intact, and the city had to be rebuilt. It is because of this fire that central Uddevalla has a grid-like structure.

=== Industries ===
When the Industrial Revolution reached Sweden, Uddevalla had fully recovered from the fire. Uddevalla's first major industry was a cotton mill named Kampenhof AB. It was built in 1857 and had 10 000 machines driven by a steam engine. A few years later in 1875, Adolf P. Zachau built a match factory called Uddevalla Tändsticksfabrik. The match factory, along with their trademark "Svalan" (translated: “The Swallow"), eventually became successful all over the world. Despite this, it was closed down in 1938. Kampenhof AB remained until 1954, when it too was closed down. The cotton mill however, stood untouched until 1982 when it was demolished. In its place today is Kampenhof Resecentrum, the main bus station of Uddevalla.

Uddevallavarvet was at its time the biggest employer in all of Bohuslän with approximately 4 000 workers at its peak. It was founded in 1946 by Gustav B. Thordén, who bought two Kaiser Shipyards, one from Portland, Maine and one from Providence, Rhode Island, and transported them across the Atlantic. When Uddevallavarvet was closed down in 1986 they had built 221 supertankers. Their biggest ship was the T/T Nanny which, with a length of 364 meters and a width of 79 meters, is the biggest ship ever built in Sweden.

== Education ==
All the high schools in Uddevalla are administered as one school, the Uddevalla Gymnasieskola ("Uddevalla High School"), which is now the largest high school in Sweden. The school has 4,000 students attending the following branches of the high school:

- Agneberg – Social studies
- Sinclair (High school) – The arts and Media studies
- Östrabo 1 – Science studies
- Östrabo Y – Heavy industry schooling
- Margretegärde – Social studies and Science studies

There are also many primary schools in Uddevalla, some of them are:

- Äsperödskolan
- Västerskolan
- Fridaskolan
- Ramnerödsskolan
- Norgårdenskolan
- Norrskolan
- Sommarhemsskolan

== Sports ==
=== Arenas ===
Agnebergshallen is an indoor sports arena for various sports including handball.

The home ground for the IK Oddevold is the outdoor arena Rimnersvallen. A large indoor arena, the Rimnershallen, is next to the Rimnersvallen. It is used for handball and floorball as well as other sports.

=== Sports clubs ===
The following sports clubs are located in Uddevalla:

==== Football ====
- IK Oddevold
- IFK Uddevalla
- IFK Lane
- Herrestad AIF
- IK Rössö
- IK Svane
- Rosseröds IK

==== Swimming ====
- UDDEVALLA SIM

==== Hockey ====
- Uddevalla HC

==== Handball ====
- GF Kroppskultur(GFK)
- Uddevalla HK(UHK)

==== Floorball ====
- Walkesborg 99
- Herrestad AIF

==== Futsal ====
- IFK Uddevalla Futsal Swedish Championship gold season 2016/2017.
- IK Oddevold Futsal

== Sites of interest ==
- Uddevalla Bridge is a 1,7-kilometer long bridge across Byfjorden which was completed in May 2000. It is a part of European route E6.
- Uddevalla Clock Tower stands at the top of a hill above the town square. It was originally built in the 18th century, but had some major renovations in the 1830s.
- The Museum of Bohuslän is located in central Uddevalla.
- The Kuröd Shell Banks are the biggest shell banks in the world. Fossils from more than 100 different species of animals have been found here, and some of said fossils are more than 10 000 years old.
- The ruins of Tureborg Castle can be found in southern Uddevalla. The medieval-style castle was built by Ture Malmgren and was completed 1912, before it was burnt down in 1950.
- Gustavsberg is one of the oldest seaside resorts in Sweden. It is located on the southern coast of Byfjorden, a 30-minute walk from the city centre. Most of the 19th century buildings remain today.

== Transportation ==
=== Highways and major roads ===
The European route E6 passes through Torp Köpcentrum in west Uddevalla. From there, county road 161 goes west towards Lysekil, while national road 44 goes east. The 44 passes through Uddevalla city centre and Kuröd industrial area before continuing to Trollhättan and Götene. County road 172 starts in Kuröd, connects with the 44, and continues north through Dalsland.

=== Bus ===
Most public transport in Uddevalla is operated by Västtrafik since it is a part of Västra Götaland County. Uddevalla has a network of city buses featuring 50 stops and 6 lines, all of which stop at Kampenhof Resecentrum, one of Uddevalla's two bus stations. The other bus station is called Torp Terminalen which is located at Torp Köpcentrum. Most regional buses stop at Torp instead of Kampenhof because of Torp's proximity to four major roads. Some notable destinations Västtrafik offers bus routes to from Uddevalla are Ljungskile, Färgelanda, Bengtsfors, Trollhättan, Munkedal, Kungshamn, Smögen, Tanumshede, Strömstad, Henån, Stenungsund, Lysekil, Kungälv, and Gothenburg. Additionally, Vy bus4you offers long distance buses between Copenhagen and Oslo, which stop at Torp Terminalen.

=== Train ===
Uddevalla has two train stations: Uddevalla Central and Uddevalla Östra (“Uddevalla East”). Both are a part of the Bohus Line, while the Central Station also is a part of the Älvsborg Line.

== Nature Reserves ==
Uddevalla municipality has four nature reserves. The Gustafbergs area nature reserve and Korpbergets nature reserve which are both included in the EU-network Natura 2000. While Emaus and Ture dalar are municipal nature reserves.

== Twin towns – sister cities ==
Uddevalla is twinned with:

- Jõhvi, Estonia
- Loimaa, Finland
- Mosfellsbær, Iceland
- North Ayrshire, Scotland, United Kingdom
- Okazaki, Japan
- Skien, Norway
- Thisted, Denmark

== Notable people ==
- Oscar Akermo – tattoo artist
- Jenny Alm – handballer
- Marianne Aminoff – actress
- Eva Andersson – swimmer
- Håkan Andersson – motocross racer
- Wilma Andersson – murder victim
- Eva Andersson-Dubin – physician and model
- Mikael Appelgren – handballer
- Johan Arneng – footballer
- Percy Barnevik – business executive
- Signe Barth – painter
- Lars Bäckström – politician
- Peter Berggren – swimmer
- Beata Bergström – photographer
- Rebecka Blomqvist – footballer
- Sofie Börjesson – handballer
- Johanna Bundsen – handballer
- Einar Dahl – politician and Esperantist
- Jonas Dahlberg – artist
- Martin Dahlin – footballer
- Robert Dahlqvist – musician
- Klas Eksell – army Major General
- Edvard Evers – Lutheran priest
- Caroline Farberger – business executive
- Lisa Fonssagrives – model and photographer
- Mathias Fredriksson – cross country skier
- Knut Fridell – wrestler
- Joel Gistedt – ice hockey player
- Berndt Grundevik – army Major General
- Liselott Hagberg – politician
- Hans Håkansson – footballer and journalist
- Jack Hermansson – mixed martial artist
- Linnéa Hillberg – actress
- Per Johansson – handballer
- Arnrid Johnston – sculptor
- Jessica Karlsson – golfer
- Karl-Axel Karlsson – sports shooter
- Kim Kärnfalk – singer
- Agneta Klingspor – author
- Johan Philip Korn – painter
- Patrik Liljestrand – handballer
- Carl Linde – football manager
- Birger Ljungström – engineer
- Jonas Patrik Ljungström – cartographer
- Karla López – politician
- Therèse Lundin, swimmer
- Agnes Magnell – architect
- Ture Malmgren – journalist and politician
- Ellen Mattson – writer
- Jonas Olsson – Finnish music producer
- Anders Osborne – American singer-songwriter
- Jeanna Oterdahl – educator and author
- Johan Patriksson – footballer
- Cristina Husmark Pehrsson – politician
- Örjan Persson – footballer
- Angelo Vega Rodriguez – futsal player
- Ester Roeck-Hansen – actress
- Lotten Rönquist- painter
- Lars Schmidt – director and publisher
- Erik Segerstedt – singer
- Birger Simonsson – painter
- Annica Smedius – actress and singer
- Peter Spaak – Protestant reformer
- Thomas Stenström – singer-songwriter
- Anton Niklas Sundberg – Lutheran clergyman
- Peter Sunde – entrepreneur and politician
- Alfred Swahn – sports shooter
- Thomas Thorburn – economist
- Lars Uno Thulin – Norwegian engineer and politician
- Henning von Krusenstierna – Navy admiral
- Jack Vreeswijk – singer and composer
- Sylvia Vrethammar – singer
- Martin Wallström – actor
- Cissi Wallin – actress and radio personality
- Bo Wålemark – football manager
- Axel Wenner-Gren – entrepreneur
- Marie Wennersten-From – golfer
- Herman Zetterberg – jurist and politician

== See also ==
- Fjällhyddan
- Murder of Wilma Andersson
- Ture Valleys
- Eastern Cemetery
- Uddevalla Suffrage Association
