= Bohusläningen =

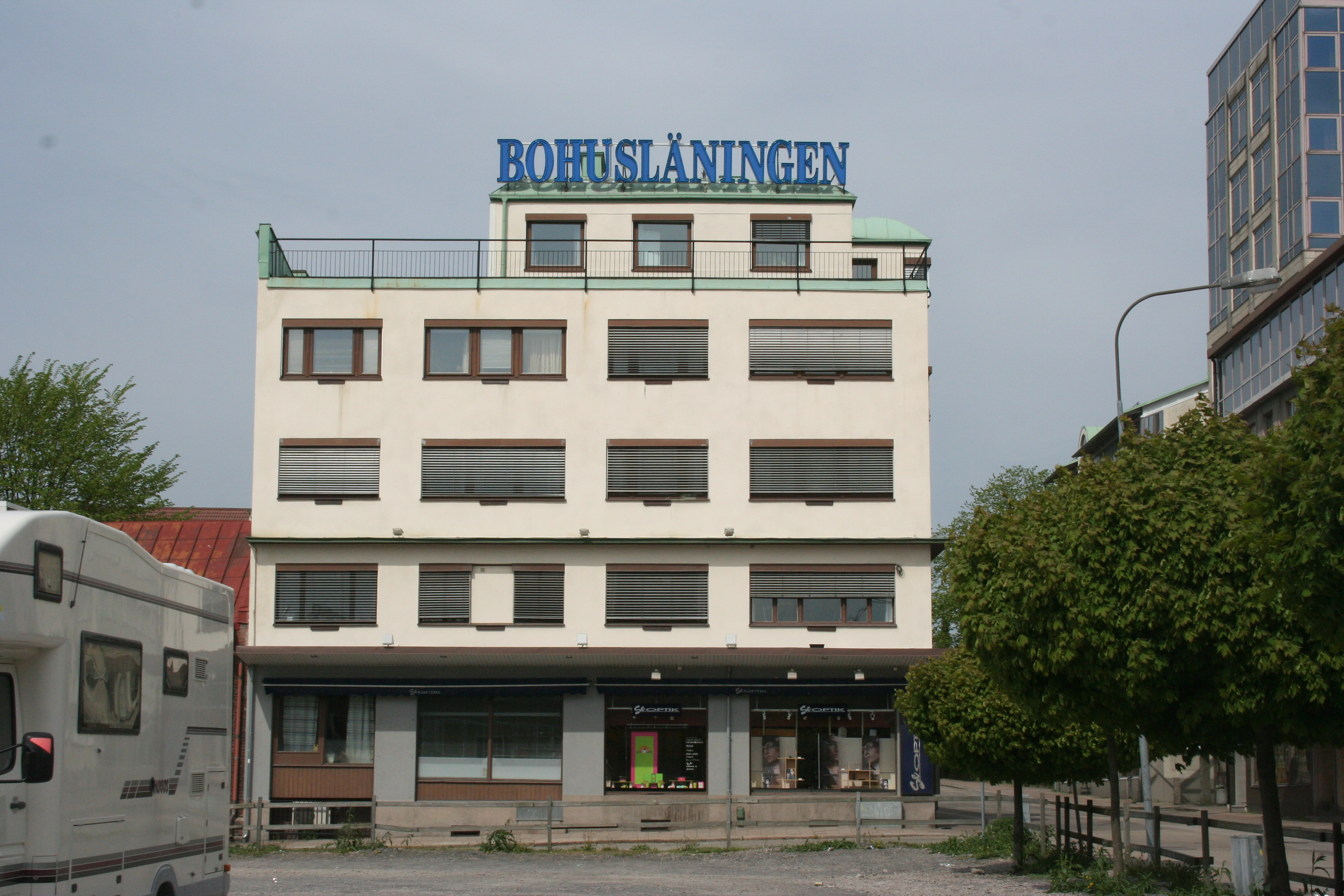
- The newspaper's main office in downtown Uddevalla
- Type: Daily newspaper
- Format: Tabloid
- Owner: Stampen AB
- Editor-in-chief: Ingalill Sundhage
- Founded: 1878; 148 years ago
- Political alignment: Independent Liberal
- Circulation: 26,700 (2013)
- ISSN: 1103-9108
- Website: www.bohuslaningen.se

Bohusläningen (Swedish: Bohusläningen, lit. 'The Bahusian') is a daily newspaper, focusing on central and northern Bohuslän, as well as western Dalsland.

== History and profile ==
The newspaper was founded in 1878 by Ture Malmgren (1851-1922), a local publisher and politician. Bohusläningen considers itself Independent Liberal in regards to politics. Headquartered at Uddevalla, the paper has local editorial offices in Henån, Munkedal, Färgelanda, Tanumshede, Kungshamn and Lysekil.

Bohusläningen was published in broadsheet format until October 2003 when its format was changed to tabloid format.

The circulation of Bohusläningen was 27,800 copies in 2012 and 26,700 copies in 2013.
