= Tureborg Castle =

Faux-medieval castle in Sweden

Coordinates: 58.3405°N 11.9527°E

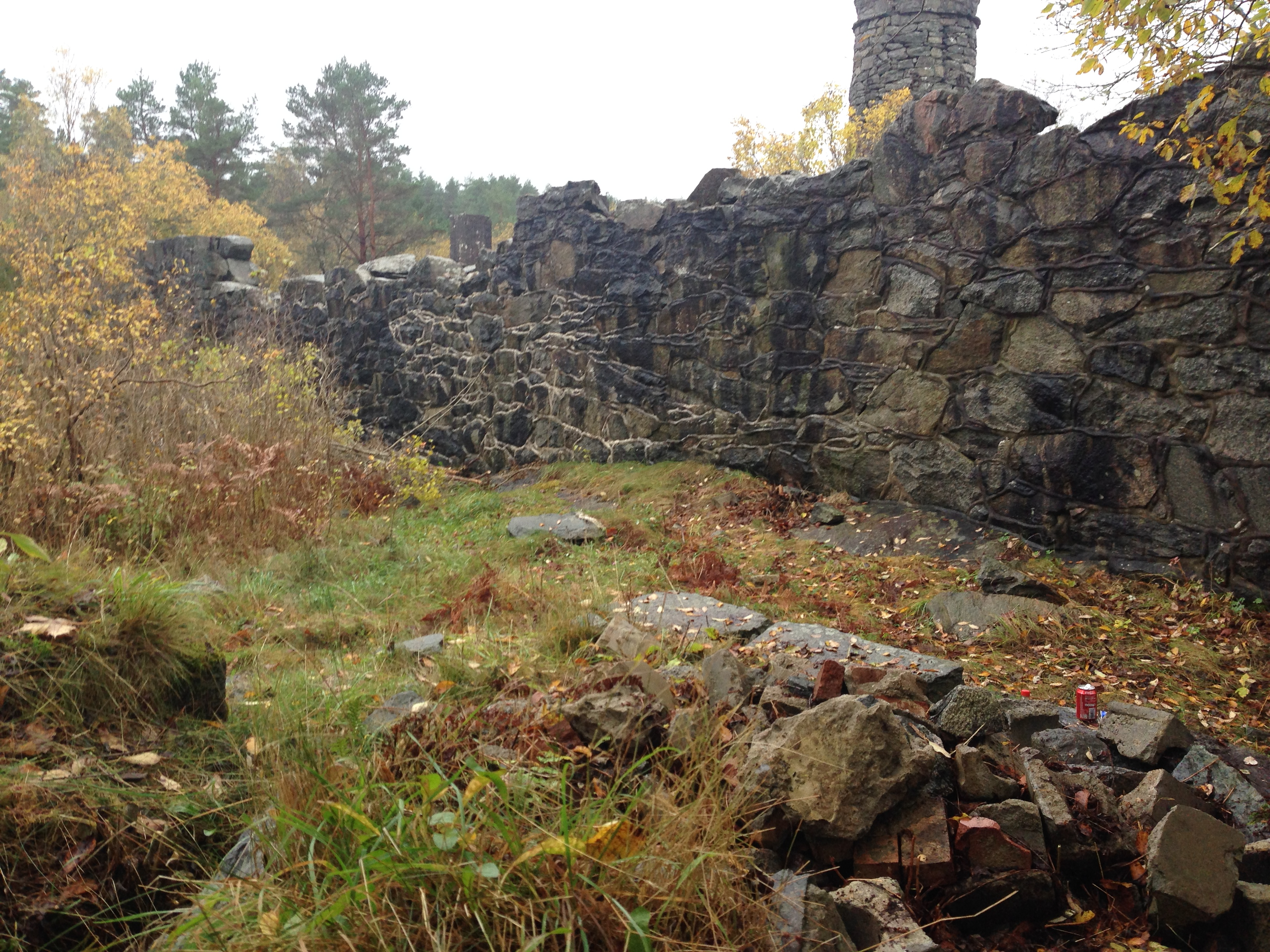
Tureborg Castle ruins

Tureborg Castle is a faux-medieval castle located in Uddevalla Municipality, Sweden, it sits atop a hill overlooking the neighbourhood of Tureborg . It was constructed during the late 19th century and early 20th century. Today a ruin after a fire in the 1950s, the castle remains a prominent landmark in Uddevalla.

== History ==
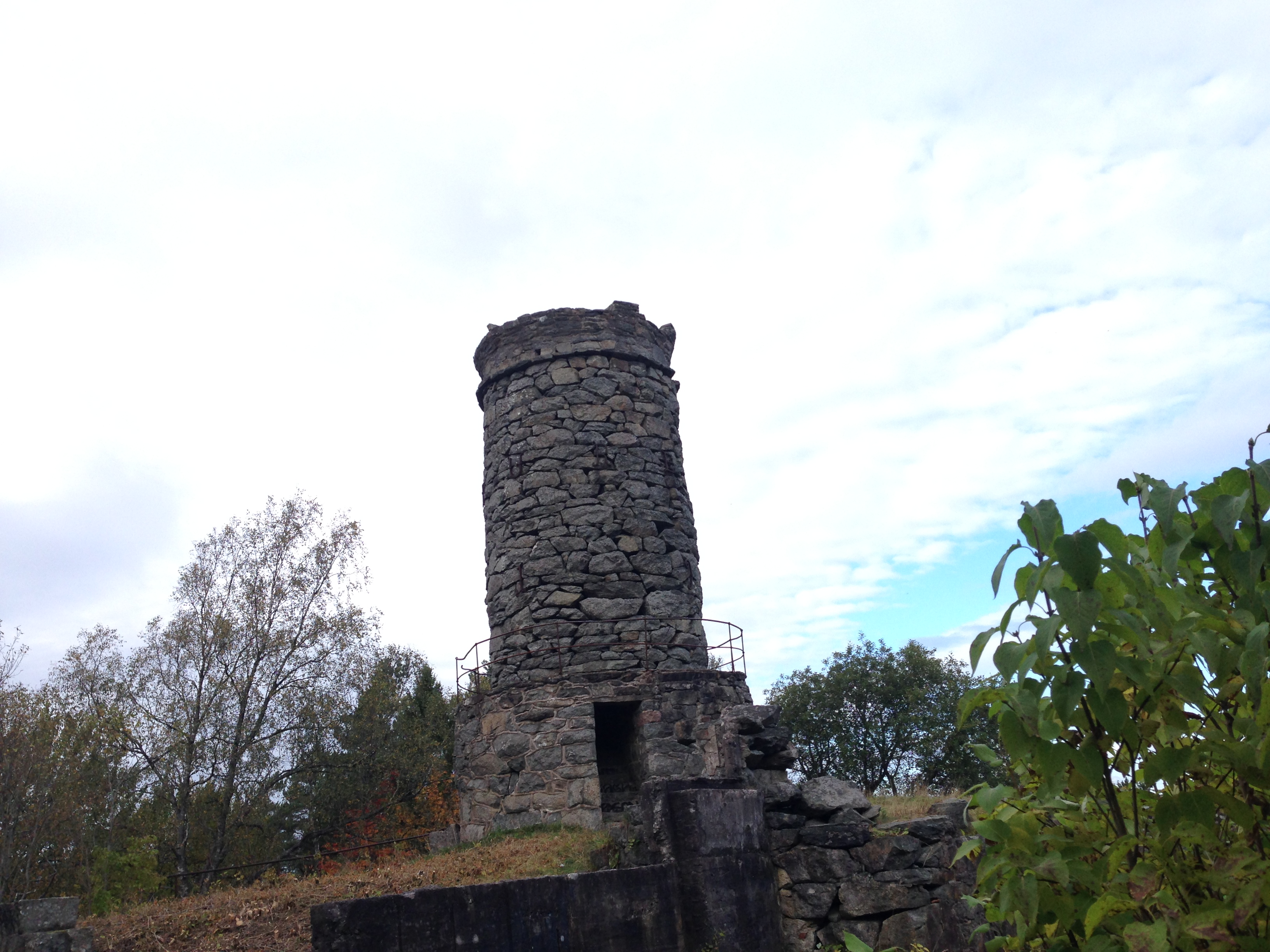
Remaining tower of Tureborg Castle

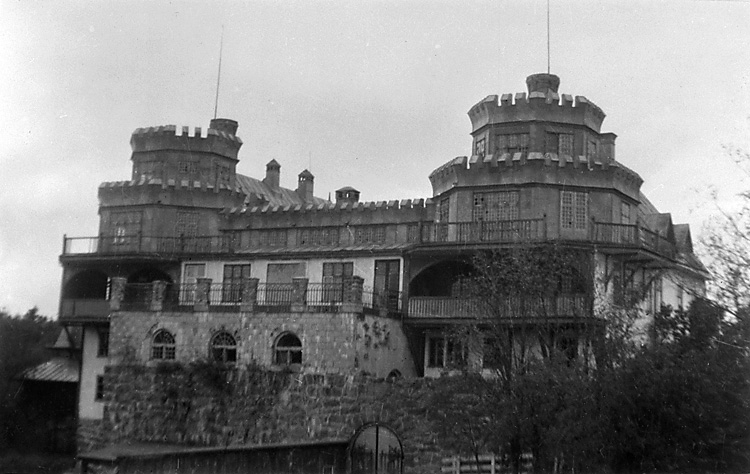
Tureborg Castle, ca. 1930

The castle was built by Ture Malmgren, founder of the newspaper Bohusläningen and liberal local politician. Malmgren appears to have been inspired by medieval castles he saw travelling in Germany. Construction began in 1899, and continued until 1912, although it was never fully finished. An opening ceremony, featuring invited journalists from Gothenburg, was held during the Pentecost of 1911. The faux-medieval castle consisted of, among other things, almost forty different rooms, a great hall with rough stone pillars, several towers, balconies, and tall stone walls. Among the rooms were a bedouin-style room, a bowling alley, a music room with three pianos, and several rooms with artworks by among others the painter Anders Zorn. Typical of Malmgren's style, a secret passage was included, activated by pressing a hidden button on a wooden panel.

No proper blueprints were ever used, instead much of the structure was largely improvised from postcards depicting the castles of the Rhine Valley, with help from Malmgren's close friend, the builder J. A. Widén. While Malmgren had a significant fortune, the construction was still a significant expense – to lower the costs, cheap materials were procured by buying and demolishing old timber houses in the city.

Until his death in 1922, Malmgren held many grand feasts inspired by national romanticism, featuring for example fully roasted pigs and mead served in wooden tankards. During the last six years of his life he was however physically unable to visit the place, admiring it from afar in his home Villa Elfkulla. After he died, Malmgren's widow Hilma never put her foot in the castle again, staying in Villa Elfkullen at the hill's foot. Over the following decades the building gradually fell into disrepair. The land was bought in 1942 by August Löfgren, who divided it into several smaller lots. Several prospective buyers appeared – among them two businessmen whose desires to settle in the castle were dismissed by their wives, the Swedish Author Association which wanted to dismantle the castle and move it to Stockholm, and a communist association in Uddevalla. During the Second World War, soldiers mobilized in case of invasion were housed in the castle. Continued disrepair, combined with vandalism, led to its purchase by the builder Kjell Stolt, who planned to dismantle the castle and reuse its timber. Before he could do so, a fire broke out on 26 November 1950, consuming all of Tureborg.

In the 21st century, the castle is prominent among the city's landmarks. Despite this, the area has only irregularly been taken care of, with the ruins facing slow decay, overgrowth, and vandalism. In September 2014 a newly formed group, the Tureborgen Society (Swedish: Sällskapet Tureborgen) set out to start maintaining the castle. On 22 September a first round of maintenance began, with minor repairs made and encroaching vegetation removed.

== Gallery ==
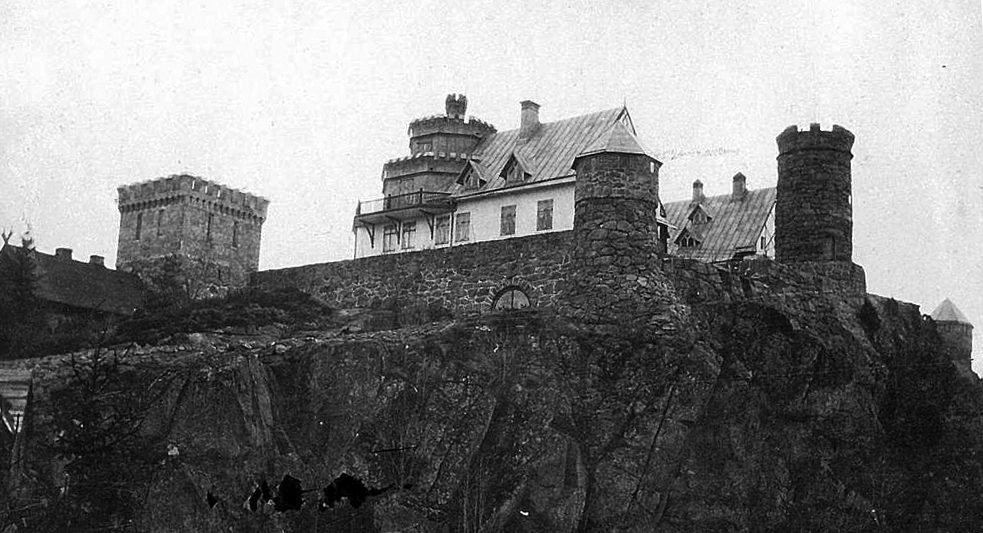

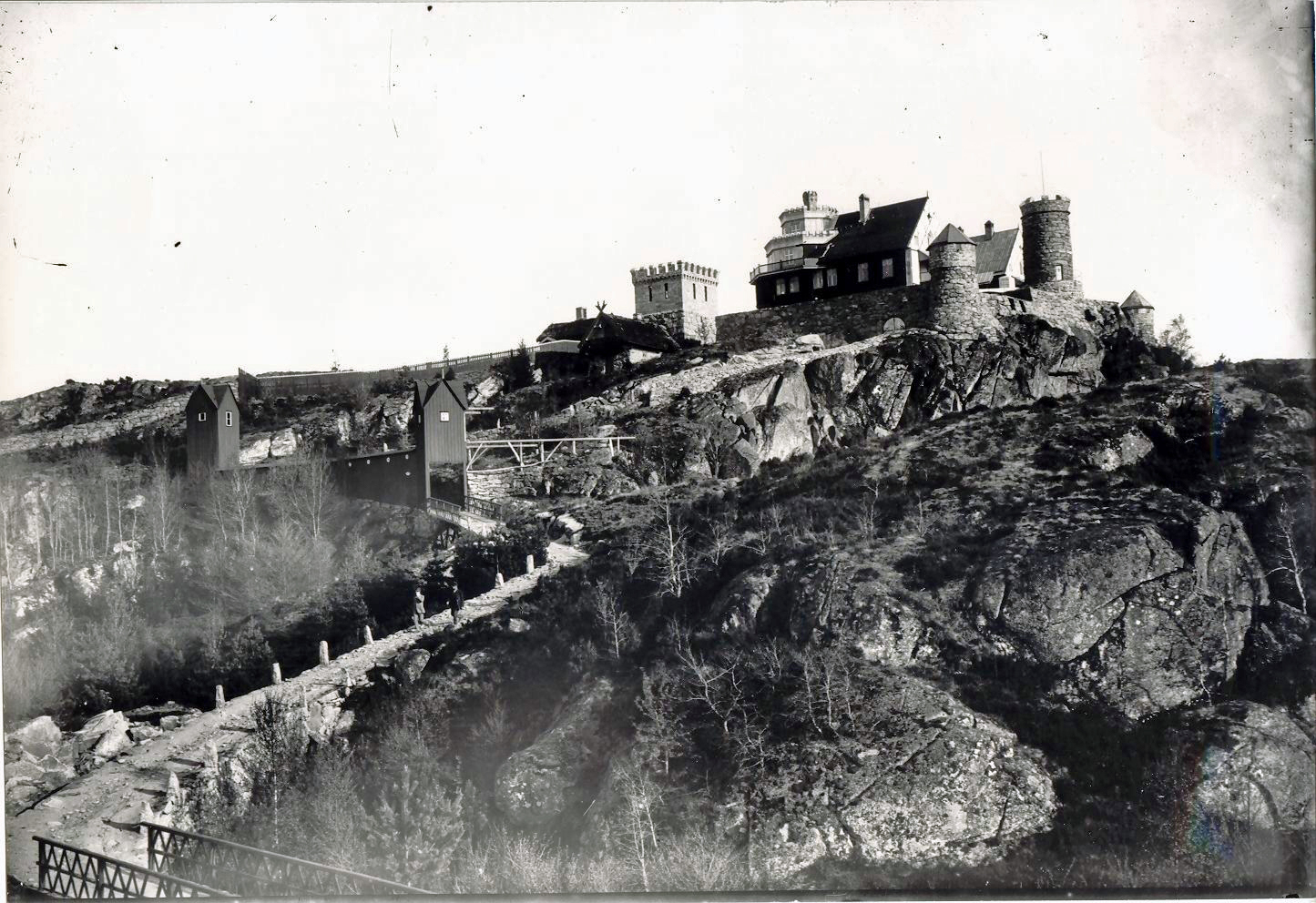

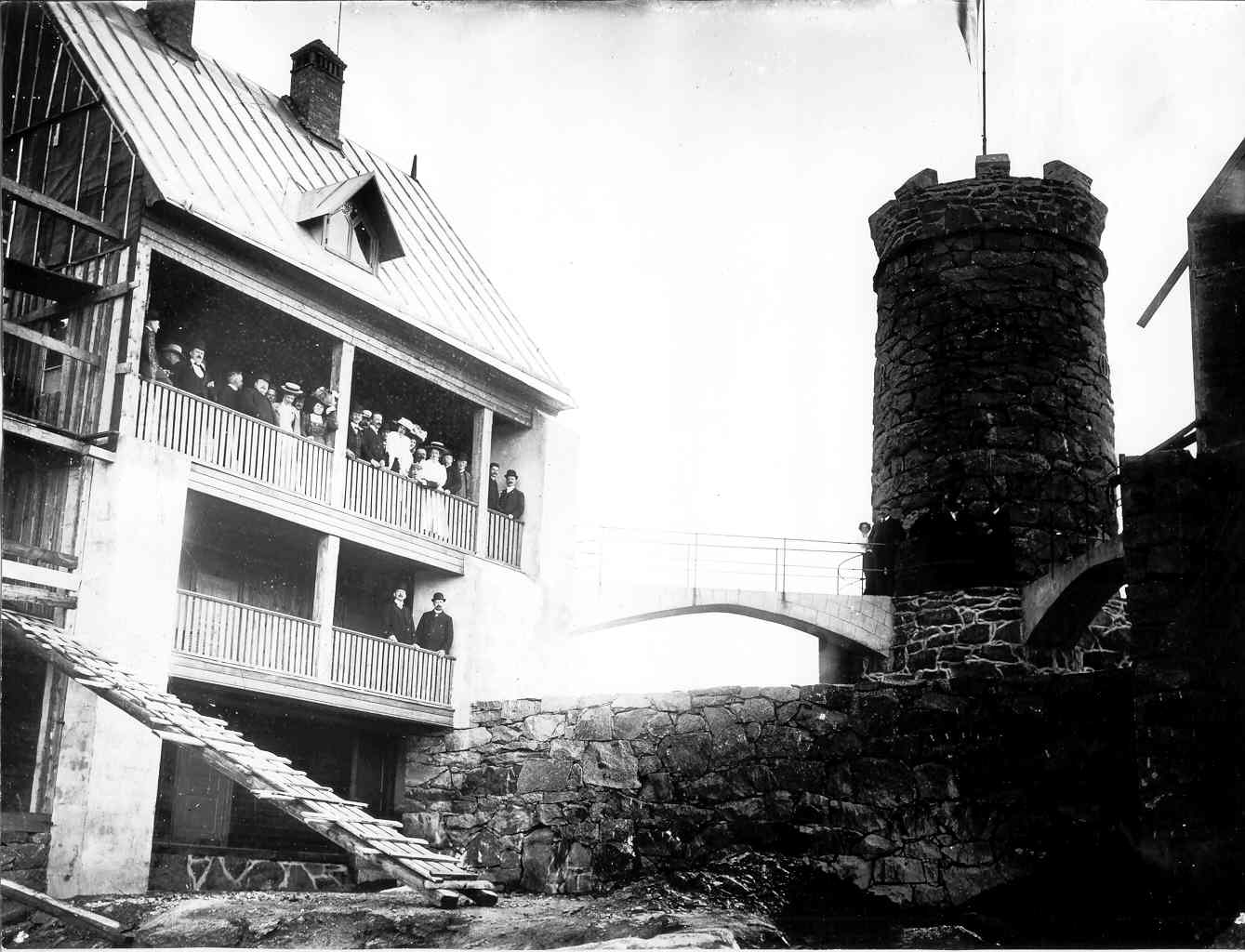

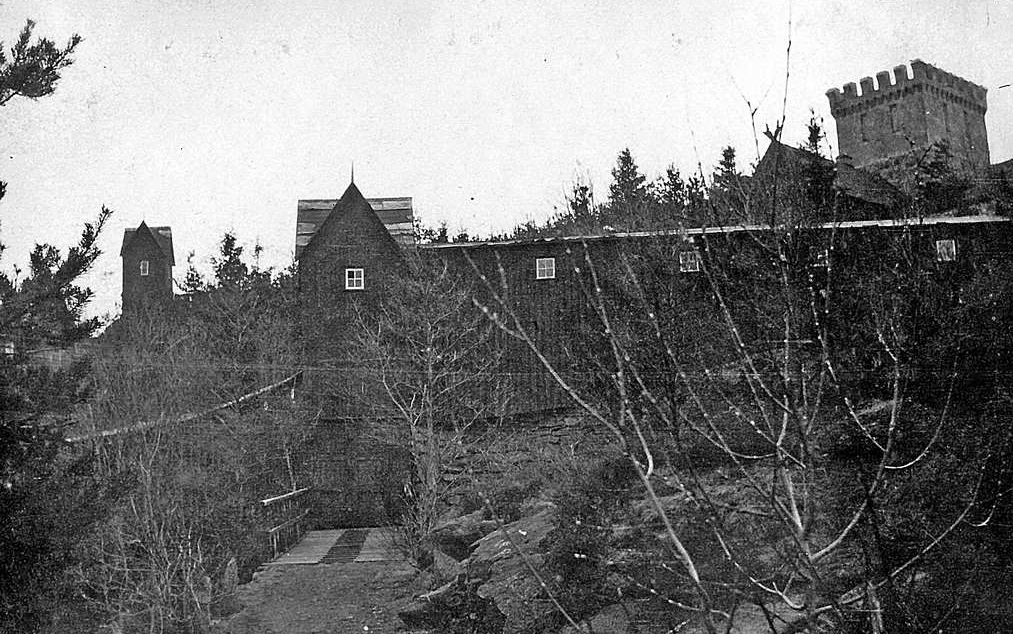

== See also ==
- Dynge Castle
- Fjällhyddan
- Tomb of Ture Malmgren
