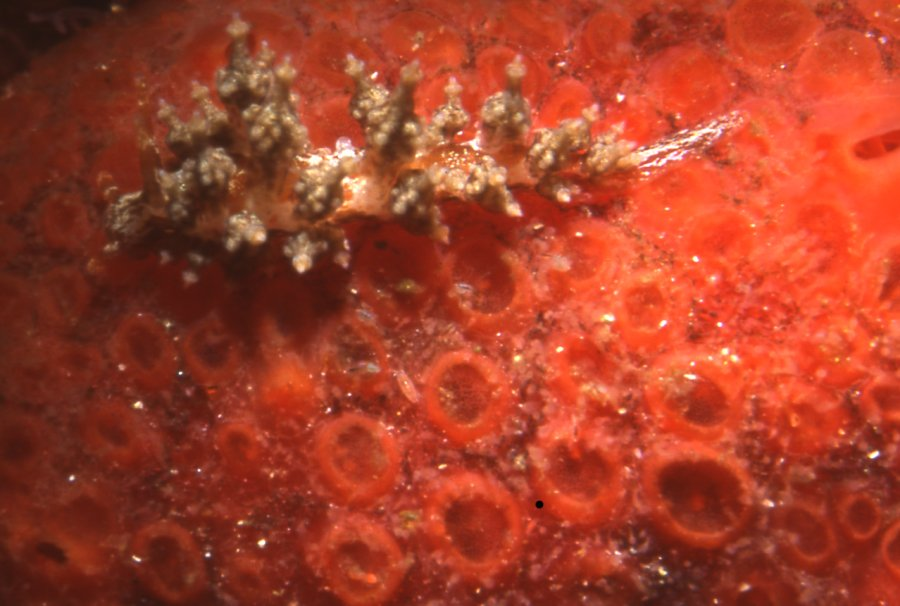
- the candelabra nudibranch, Eubranchus sp.

Scientific classification
- Kingdom: Animalia
- Phylum: Mollusca
- Class: Gastropoda
- Order: Nudibranchia
- Suborder: Aeolidacea
- Family: Eubranchidae
- Genus: Eubranchus; Forbes, 1838

Type species
- Eubranchus tricolor Forbes, 1838

Synonyms
- Egalvina Odhner, 1929; Galvina Alder & Hancock, 1855

= Eubranchus =

Genus of molluscs

Eubranchus is a genus of aeolid nudibranch in the family Eubranchidae.

The name Eubranchus has been placed on the Official List by ICZN Opinion 774.

== Species ==
Korshunova et al. (2025) restricted Eubranchus only to its type species:

- Eubranchus tricolor Forbes, 1838

Species within the genus Eubranchus that were not provided an alternate designation are as follows:

- Eubranchus agrius Er. Marcus, 1959
- Eubranchus arci Ortea, 1981
- Eubranchus capellinii Trinchese, 1879
- Eubranchus conicla Er. Marcus, 1958
- Eubranchus convenientis Ortea & Caballer, 2002
- Eubranchus cucullus Behrens, 1985
- Eubranchus echizenicus Baba, 1975
- Eubranchus eibesfeldti Ortea, Caballer & Bacallado, 2003
- Eubranchus falklandicus Eliot, 1907
- Eubranchus flexus Grishina, Antokhina & Ekimova, 2023
- Eubranchus fuegiensis Odhner, 1926
- Eubranchus inabai Baba, 1964
- Eubranchus leopoldoi Caballer, Ortea & Espinosa, 2001
- Eubranchus mannarensis K. P. Rao, 1968
- Eubranchus mimeticus Baba, 1975
- Eubranchus montraveli Risbec, 1937
- Eubranchus occidentalis MacFarland, 1966
- Eubranchus ocellatus Alder & Hancock, 1864
- Eubranchus productus Farran, 1905
- Eubranchus rubeolus Burn, 1964
- Eubranchus rubrocerata Edmunds, 2015
- Eubranchus rustyus Er. Marcus, 1961
- Eubranchus sp. 4 - fireworks nudibranch
- Eubranchus sp. 5 - candelabra nudibranch
- Eubranchus tanzanensis Edmunds, 1969
- Eubranchus telesforoi Ortea, Caballer & Bacallado, 2002
- Eubranchus toledanoi Ortea & Caballer, 2002
- Eubranchus vascoi Ortea, Caballer & Moro, 2002
- Eubranchus yolandae Hermosillo & Valdes, 2007

Species brought into synonymy

- Eubranchus adarensis Odhner, 1934: synonym of Galvinella adarensis
- Eubranchus alexeii Martynov, 1998: synonym of Aenigmastyletus alexeii
- Eubranchus amazighi Tamsouri, Carmona, Moukrim & Cervera, 2015: synonym of Amphorina amazighi
- Eubranchus cingulatus Alder & A. Hancock, 1847: synonym of Capellinia vittata Alder and Hancock, 1842
- Eubranchus coniclus Er. Marcus, 1958: synonym of Eubranchus conicla
- Eubranchus doriae Trinchese, 1874: synonym of Capellinia doriae
- Eubranchus exiguus Alder and Hancock, 1848: synonym of Nudibranchus exiguus
- Eubranchus farrani Alder & Hancock, 1844: synonym of Amphorina farrani
- Eubranchus fidenciae Ortea, Moro & Espinosa, 1999: synonym of Trinchesia fidenciae
- Eubranchus glacialis Thiele, 1912: synonym of Galvinella glacialis
- Eubranchus horii Baba, 1960: synonym of Nihonbranchus horii
- Eubranchus linensis García-Gómez, Cervera & F. J. García, 1990: synonym of Amphorina linensis
- Eubranchus malakhovi Ekimova, Mikhlina, Vorobyeva, Antokhina, Tambovtseva & Shepetov, 2021: synonym of Corruptobranchus malakhovi
- Eubranchus mandapamensis Rao, 1968: synonym of Annulorhina mandapamensis
- Eubranchus misakiensis Baba, 1960: synonym of Leostyletus misakiensis
- Eubranchus novik Schepetov, Antokhina, Malaquias, Valdés & Ekimova, 2024: synonym of Eubranchulus novik
- Eubranchus odhneri Derjugin & Gurjanova, 1926: synonym of Corruptobranchus odhneri
- Eubranchus olivaceus O'Donoghue, 1922: synonym of Eubranchulus olivaceus
- Eubranchus pallidus Alder & Hancock, 1842: synonym of Amphorina pallida Alder & Hancock, 1842
- Eubranchus prietoi Llera & Ortea, 1981: synonym of Capellinia prietoi
- Eubranchus putnami Fernández-Simón & Moles, 2023: synonym of Longibranchus putnami
- Eubranchus rubropunctatus Edmunds, 1969: synonym of Produnga rubropunctata Edmunds, 1969
- Eubranchus rupium Møller, 1842: synonym of Eubranchulus rupium
- Eubranchus sanjuanensis Roller, 1972: synonym of Corruptobranchus sanjuanensis
- Eubranchus scintillans Grishina, Schepetov & Ekimova, 2022 : synonym of Nudibranchus scintillans
- Eubranchus steinbecki Behrens, 1987: synonym of Capellinia steinbecki
- Eubranchus virginalis Baba, 1949: synonym of Eubranchopsis virginalis
- Eubranchus viriola Korshunova, Malmberg, Prkić, Petani, Fletcher, Lundin & Martynov, 2020 : synonym of Amphorina viriola
- Eubranchus vittatus Alder and Hancock, 1842: synonym of Capellinia vittata Alder and Hancock, 1842
