= Eubranchus vascoi =

Scientific classification
- Kingdom: Animalia
- Phylum: Mollusca
- Class: Gastropoda
- Order: Nudibranchia
- Suborder: Aeolidacea
- Family: Eubranchidae
- Genus: Eubranchus
- Species: E. vascoi

Binomial name
- Eubranchus vascoi Ortea, Caballer & Moro, 2002

Species of gastropod

Eubranchus vascoi is a species of sea slug or nudibranch, a marine gastropod mollusc in the family Eubranchidae.

== Distribution ==
This species was described from São Pedro, São Miguel Island, Azores, Portugal. It is reported from La Tejita, Tenerife, Canary Islands.
