= Capellinia =

Scientific classification
- Kingdom: Animalia
- Phylum: Mollusca
- Class: Gastropoda
- Order: Nudibranchia
- Suborder: Aeolidacea
- Family: Eubranchidae
- Genus: Capellinia; Trinchese, 1873

Type species
- Capellinia doriae Trinchese, 1874

Genus of gastropods

Capellinia is a genus of sea slugs, specifically of aeolid nudibranchs in the family Eubranchidae.

== Species ==
According to Korshunova et al. (2025), species in this genus include:

- Capellinia doriae Trinchese, 1874
- Capellinia fustifera Lovén, 1846
- Capellinia vittata Alder & Hancock, 1842

Additional taxa within Capellinia not provided with an alternate designation by Korshunova et al. (2025) include:

- Capellinia prietoi Llera & Ortea, 1981
- Capellinia steinbecki Behrens, 1987

Taxon inquirendum

- Capellinia fuscannulata K. P. Rao, 1968

Species brought into synonymy

- Capellinia capellinii (Trinchese, 1879): synonym of Eubranchus capellinii (Trinchese, 1879) (synonym)
- Capellinia conicla Er. Marcus, 1958: synonym of Eubranchus conicla (Er. Marcus, 1958) (original combination)
- Capellinia rustya Marcus, 1961: synonym of Eubranchus rustyus (Er. Marcus, 1961)
