= Eubranchus telesforoi =

Scientific classification
- Kingdom: Animalia
- Phylum: Mollusca
- Class: Gastropoda
- Order: Nudibranchia
- Suborder: Aeolidacea
- Family: Eubranchidae
- Genus: Eubranchus
- Species: E. telesforoi

Binomial name
- Eubranchus telesforoi Ortea, Caballer & Bacallado, 2002

Species of gastropod

Eubranchus telesforoi is a species of sea slug or nudibranch, a marine gastropod mollusc in the family Eubranchidae.

== Distribution ==
This species was described from La Tejita, Tenerife, Canary Islands, Spain.
