= Eubranchus falklandicus =

Scientific classification
- Kingdom: Animalia
- Phylum: Mollusca
- Class: Gastropoda
- Order: Nudibranchia
- Suborder: Aeolidacea
- Family: Eubranchidae
- Genus: Eubranchus
- Species: E. falklandicus

Binomial name
- Eubranchus falklandicus (Eliot, 1907)

Synonyms
- Galvina falklandica Eliot, 1907 (basionym)

Species of gastropod

Eubranchus falklandicus is a species of sea slug or nudibranch, a marine gastropod mollusc in the family Eubranchidae.

== Distribution ==
This species was described from the Falkland Islands. It has not been reported since the original description.
