= Eubranchus leopoldoi =

Scientific classification
- Kingdom: Animalia
- Phylum: Mollusca
- Class: Gastropoda
- Order: Nudibranchia
- Suborder: Aeolidacea
- Family: Eubranchidae
- Genus: Eubranchus
- Species: E. leopoldoi

Binomial name
- Eubranchus leopoldoi Caballer, Ortea & Espinosa, 2001

Species of gastropod

Eubranchus leopoldoi is a species of sea slug or nudibranch, a marine gastropod mollusc in the family Eubranchidae.

== Distribution ==
This species was described from Punta Mona, Manzanillo, Costa Rica. It has been reported from the Bahamas.
