= Eubranchus cucullus =

Scientific classification
- Kingdom: Animalia
- Phylum: Mollusca
- Class: Gastropoda
- Order: Nudibranchia
- Suborder: Aeolidacea
- Family: Eubranchidae
- Genus: Eubranchus
- Species: E. cucullus

Binomial name
- Eubranchus cucullus Behrens, 1985

Species of gastropod

Eubranchus cucullus is a species of sea slug or nudibranch, a marine gastropod mollusc in the family Eubranchidae.

== Distribution ==
This species was described from Puerto Refugio, Isla Angel de la Guarda, Baja California, Mexico. It has also been reported from Panama.
