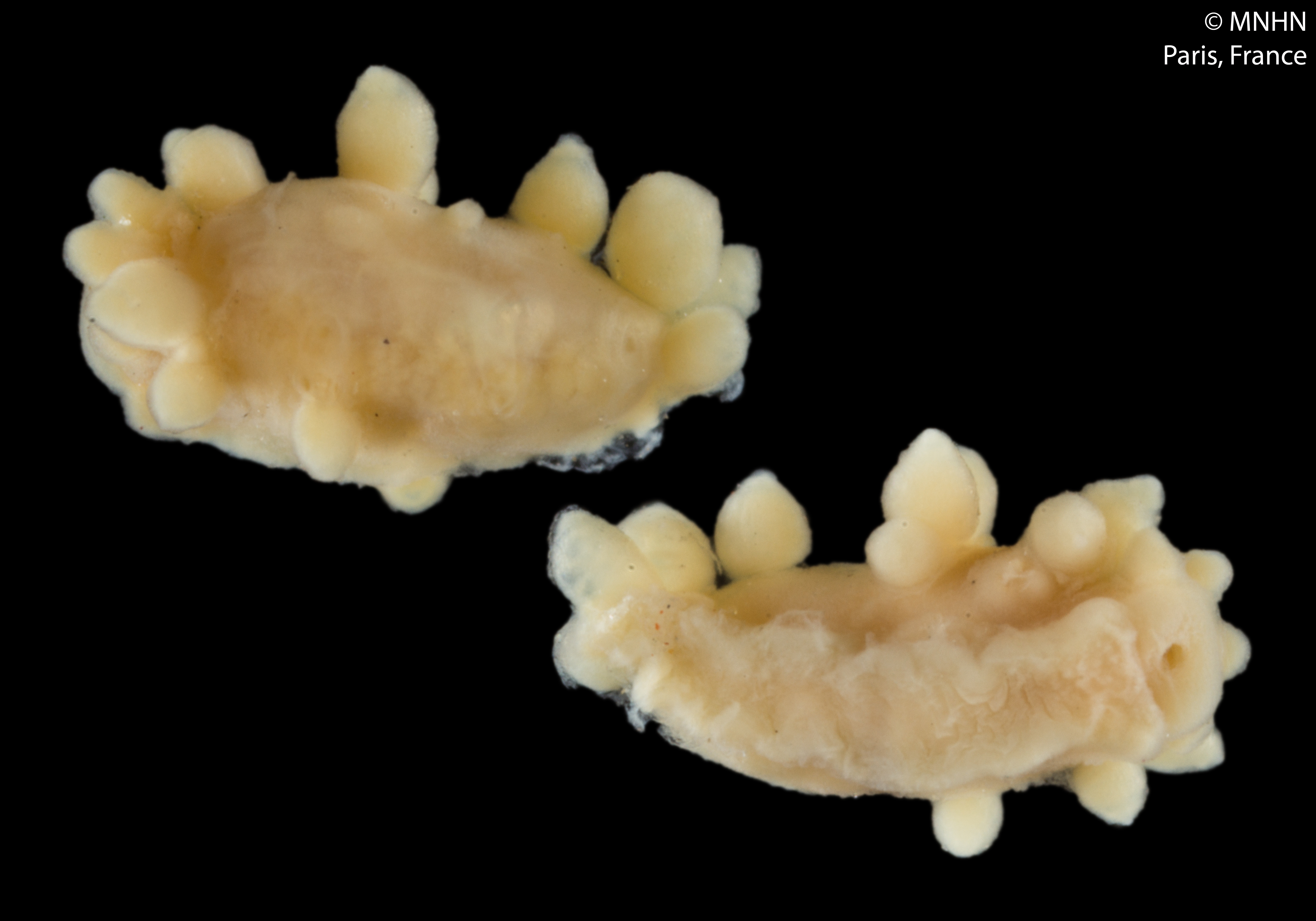
- Eubranchus arci (holotype at MNHN, Paris)

Scientific classification
- Kingdom: Animalia
- Phylum: Mollusca
- Class: Gastropoda
- Order: Nudibranchia
- Suborder: Aeolidacea
- Family: Eubranchidae
- Genus: Eubranchus
- Species: E. arci

Binomial name
- Eubranchus arci Ortea, 1981

= Eubranchus arci =

Species of gastropod

Eubranchus arci is a species of sea slug or nudibranch, a marine gastropod mollusc in the family Eubranchidae.

== Description ==
The length of this marine species attains 5 mm.

== Distribution ==
This species was described from Punta Hidalgo, Tenerife, 28°35′N 16°10′W, Canary Islands.
