= Eubranchus occidentalis =

Scientific classification
- Kingdom: Animalia
- Phylum: Mollusca
- Class: Gastropoda
- Order: Nudibranchia
- Suborder: Aeolidacea
- Family: Eubranchidae
- Genus: Eubranchus
- Species: E. occidentalis

Binomial name
- Eubranchus occidentalis MacFarland, 1966

Species of gastropod

Eubranchus occidentalis is a species of sea slug or nudibranch, a marine gastropod mollusc in the family Eubranchidae.

== Distribution ==
This species was described from Monterey Bay, California. It is considered by some authors to be a synonym of Eubranchus rustyus.

== Biology ==
MacFarland reports that this nudibranch feeds on the hydroid Hydractinia, which grows on the holdfasts of Stephanocystis osmundacea.
