= Eubranchus tanzanensis =

Scientific classification
- Kingdom: Animalia
- Phylum: Mollusca
- Class: Gastropoda
- Order: Nudibranchia
- Suborder: Aeolidacea
- Family: Eubranchidae
- Genus: Eubranchus
- Species: E. tanzanensis

Binomial name
- Eubranchus tanzanensis Edmunds, 1969

Species of gastropod

Eubranchus tanzanensis is a species of sea slug or nudibranch, a marine gastropod mollusc in the family Eubranchidae.

== Distribution ==
This species was described from two animals found amongst roots of eelgrass (Cymodocea sp.) at Ladder Cove, Dar es Salaam, Tanzania.
