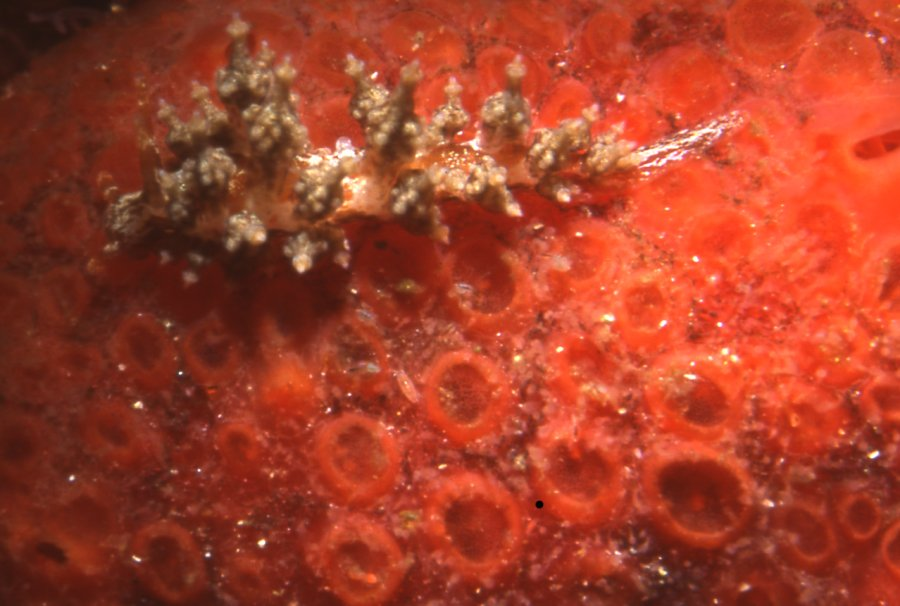

Scientific classification
- Kingdom: Animalia
- Phylum: Mollusca
- Class: Gastropoda
- Order: Nudibranchia
- Suborder: Aeolidacea
- Family: Eubranchidae
- Genus: Eubranchus
- Species: "E. sp. 5" [undescribed]

Binomial name
- "Eubranchus sp. 5" [undescribed]

= Candelabra nudibranch =

Species of gastropod

The candelabra nudibranch (Eubranchus sp. 5 as designated by Zsilavecz, 2007), is a species of sea slug or nudibranch, a marine gastropod mollusc in the family Eubranchidae. It is an aeolid nudibranch, which is known to occur off the South African coast. As of August 2015, it remained undescribed by science.

== Distribution ==
This species has to date only been found off South Africa, from the Atlantic coast of the Cape Peninsula to eastern False Bay, at depths of 5–20 m. It appears to be endemic.

== Description ==
The candelabra nudibranch is a small sea slug, reaching 10–15 mm in total length. It is a slender pale-bodied nudibranch covered with brown blotches and opaque white streaks. Its cerata are shaped rather like burning candles and are all olive coloured. The rhinophores protrude from cup-like sheaths.

== Ecology ==
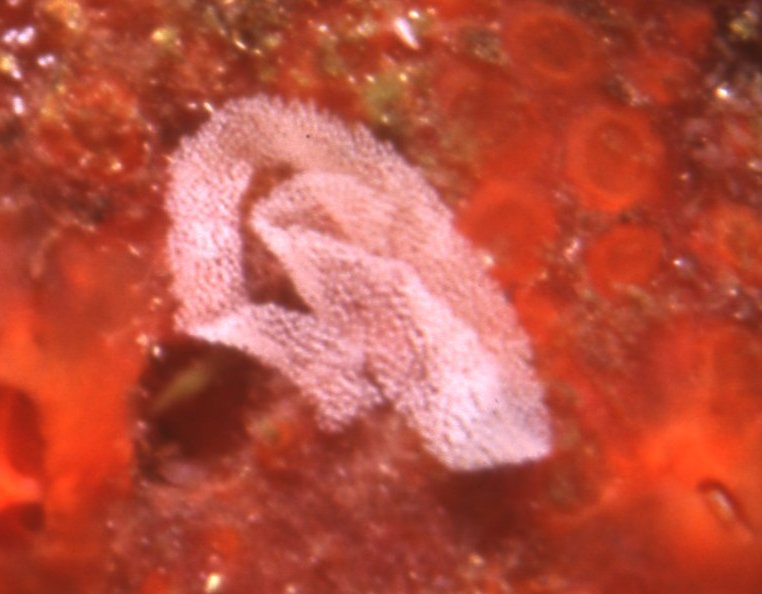
The egg ribbon of the candelabra nudibranch

This species lays a pale semi spiral collar of eggs.
