= Eubranchus rubrocerata =

Scientific classification
- Kingdom: Animalia
- Phylum: Mollusca
- Class: Gastropoda
- Order: Nudibranchia
- Suborder: Aeolidacea
- Family: Eubranchidae
- Genus: Eubranchus
- Species: E. rubrocerata

Binomial name
- Eubranchus rubrocerata Edmunds, 2015

Species of gastropod

Eubranchus rubrocerata is a species of sea slug or nudibranch, a marine gastropod mollusc in the family Eubranchidae.

== Distribution ==
This species was described from 10m depth, Kpone Bay, Greater Accra Region, Ghana.
