= Eubranchus rubeolus =

Scientific classification
- Kingdom: Animalia
- Phylum: Mollusca
- Class: Gastropoda
- Order: Nudibranchia
- Suborder: Aeolidacea
- Family: Eubranchidae
- Genus: Eubranchus
- Species: E. rubeolus

Binomial name
- Eubranchus rubeolus Burn, 1964

Species of gastropod

Eubranchus rubeolus is a species of small sea slug, an aeolid nudibranch, a marine gastropod mollusc in the family Eubranchidae. This species occurs in southeastern Australia and South Island, New Zealand.

== Distribution ==
This species was described from Point Lonsdale, Port Phillip Heads, Victoria, Australia. The species has been reported from New Zealand but there are considerable differences between the specimens.
