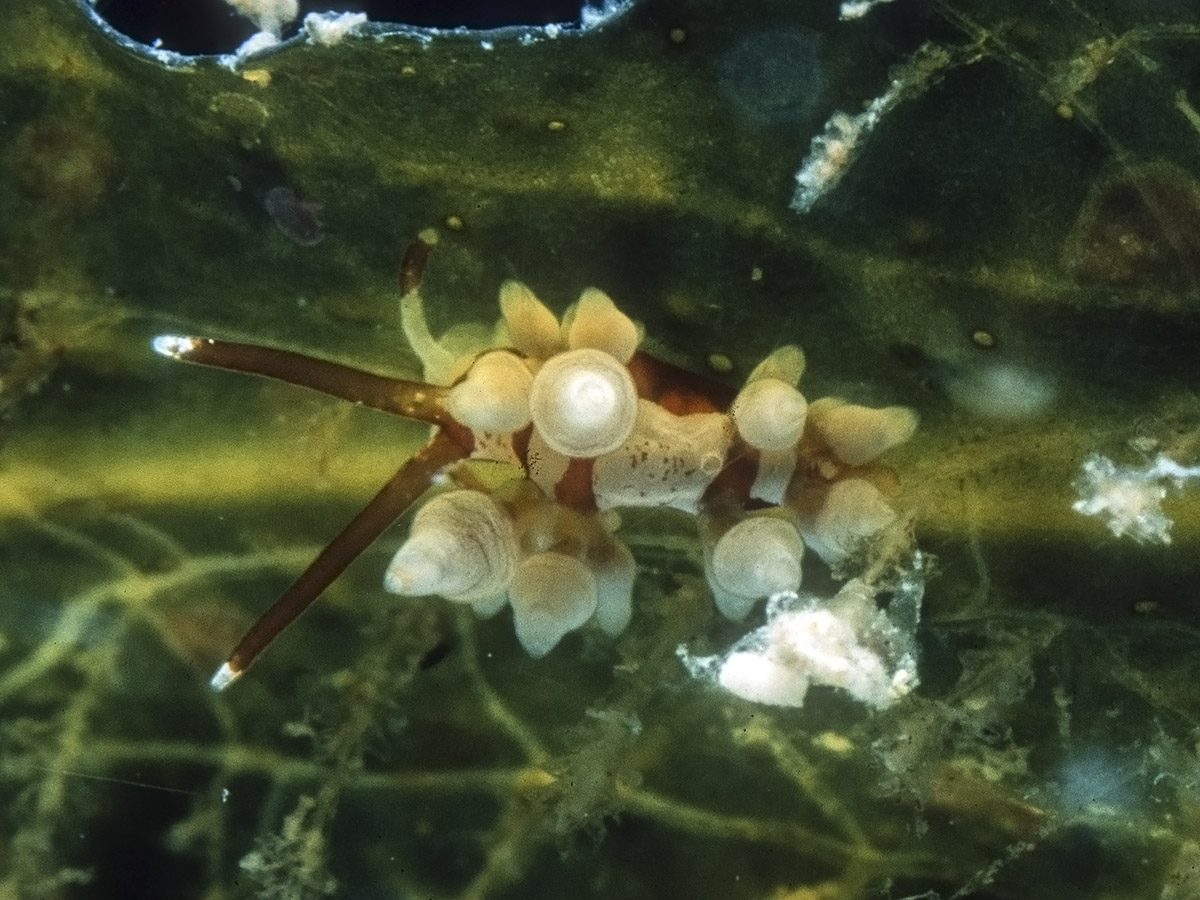
- The nudibranch Eubranchus inabai, Mirs Bay, Hong Kong.

Scientific classification
- Kingdom: Animalia
- Phylum: Mollusca
- Class: Gastropoda
- Order: Nudibranchia
- Suborder: Aeolidacea
- Family: Eubranchidae
- Genus: Eubranchus
- Species: E. inabai

Binomial name
- Eubranchus inabai Baba, 1964

= Eubranchus inabai =

Species of gastropod

Eubranchus inabai is a species of sea slug or nudibranch, a marine gastropod mollusc in the family Eubranchidae.

== Distribution ==
This species was described from Mukaishima, Seto Inland Sea, Japan. It has been reported from Hong Kong and Tuncurry, New South Wales, Eastern Australia.
