= Leostyletus pseudomisakiensis =

Scientific classification
- Kingdom: Animalia
- Phylum: Mollusca
- Class: Gastropoda
- Order: Nudibranchia
- Suborder: Aeolidacea
- Family: Eubranchidae
- Genus: Leostyletus
- Species: L. pseudomisakiensis

Binomial name
- Leostyletus pseudomisakiensis Martynov, 1998

Species of gastropod

Leostyletus pseudomisakiensis is a species of sea slug or nudibranch, a marine gastropod mollusc in the family Eubranchidae.

== Distribution ==
This species was described from the Sea of Japan.
