= Eubranchus fuegiensis =

Scientific classification
- Kingdom: Animalia
- Phylum: Mollusca
- Class: Gastropoda
- Order: Nudibranchia
- Suborder: Aeolidacea
- Family: Eubranchidae
- Genus: Eubranchus
- Species: E. fuegiensis

Binomial name
- Eubranchus fuegiensis Odhner, 1926

Species of gastropod

Eubranchus fuegiensis is a species of sea slug or nudibranch, a marine gastropod mollusc in the family Eubranchidae.

== Distribution ==
This species was described from Tierra del Fuego, Chile. It has been reported from Punta Rico, Beagle Channel.
