= Eubranchus productus =

Scientific classification
- Kingdom: Animalia
- Phylum: Mollusca
- Class: Gastropoda
- Order: Nudibranchia
- Suborder: Aeolidacea
- Family: Eubranchidae
- Genus: Eubranchus
- Species: E. productus

Binomial name
- Eubranchus productus (Farran, 1905)

Synonyms
- Galvina producta Farran, 1905

Species of gastropod

Eubranchus productus is a species of sea slug or nudibranch, a marine gastropod mollusc in the family Eubranchidae.

== Distribution ==
This species was described from the Gulf of Mannar, Ceylon.
