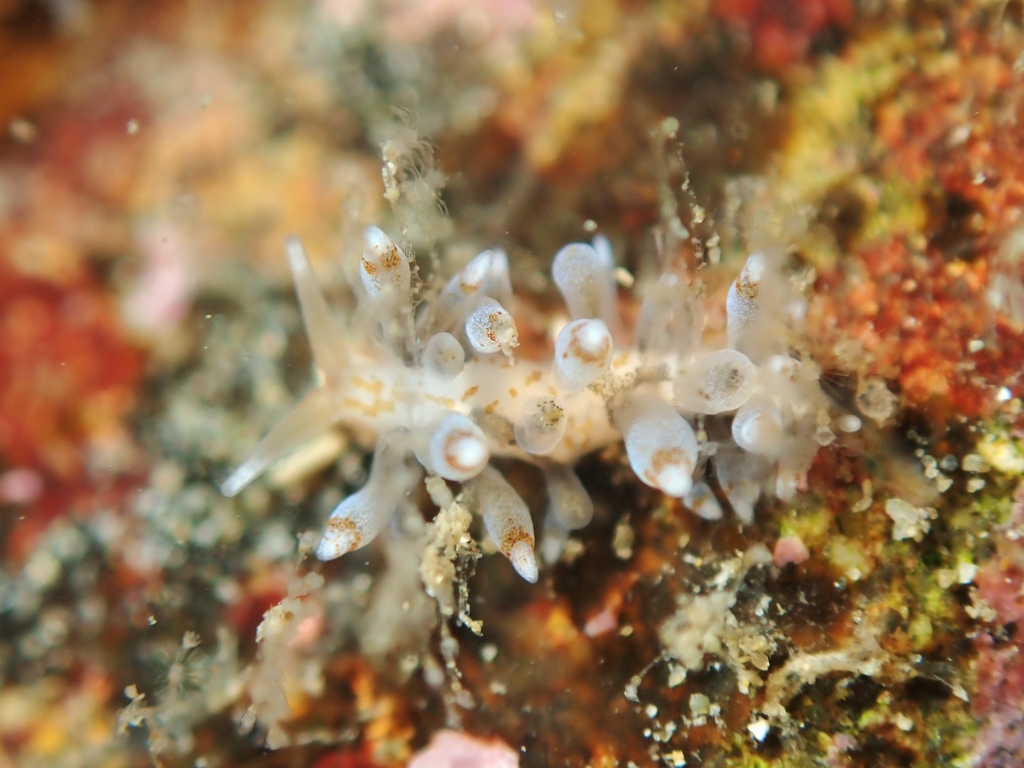

Scientific classification
- Kingdom: Animalia
- Phylum: Mollusca
- Class: Gastropoda
- Order: Nudibranchia
- Suborder: Aeolidacea
- Family: Eubranchidae
- Genus: Eubranchus
- Species: E. agrius

Binomial name
- Eubranchus agrius Marcus, 1959

= Eubranchus agrius =

Species of gastropod

Eubranchus agrius is a species of small sea slug or nudibranch, a marine gastropod mollusc in the family Eubranchidae. It is an aeolid nudibranch, which is thought to occur in New Zealand and Chile.

== Distribution ==
This species was described from Chile. It has been reported from New Zealand.
