= Eubranchus eibesfeldti =

Scientific classification
- Kingdom: Animalia
- Phylum: Mollusca
- Class: Gastropoda
- Order: Nudibranchia
- Suborder: Aeolidacea
- Family: Eubranchidae
- Genus: Eubranchus
- Species: E. eibesfeldti

Binomial name
- Eubranchus eibesfeldti Ortea, Caballer & Bacallado, 2003

Species of gastropod

Eubranchus eibesfeldti is a species of sea slug or nudibranch, a marine gastropod mollusc in the family Eubranchidae.

== Distribution ==
This species was described from Caleta James, Galápagos, Ecuador.
