= Eubranchus capellinii =

Scientific classification
- Kingdom: Animalia
- Phylum: Mollusca
- Class: Gastropoda
- Order: Nudibranchia
- Suborder: Aeolidacea
- Family: Eubranchidae
- Genus: Eubranchus
- Species: E. capellinii

Binomial name
- Eubranchus capellinii (Trinchese, 1879)

Species of gastropod

Eubranchus capellinii is a species of sea slug or nudibranch, a marine gastropod mollusc in the family Eubranchidae. It has been suggested that it is the same species as Eubranchus doriae and that this name should take precedence.

== Distribution ==
This species was described from Genova, Italy.
