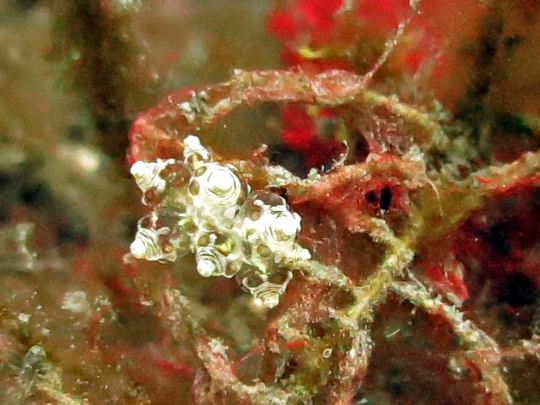

Scientific classification
- Kingdom: Animalia
- Phylum: Mollusca
- Class: Gastropoda
- Order: Nudibranchia
- Suborder: Aeolidacea
- Family: Eubranchidae
- Genus: Eubranchus
- Species: E. ocellatus

Binomial name
- Eubranchus ocellatus Alder & A. Hancock, 1864

Synonyms
- Eolis ocellata Alder & Hancock, 1864; Dunga ocellata (Alder & Hancock, 1864); Dunga nodulosa Eliot, 1902

= Eubranchus ocellatus =

Species of gastropod

Eubranchus ocellatus is a species of sea slug or nudibranch, a marine gastropod mollusc in the family Eubranchidae.

== Distribution ==
This species was described from Waltair, Vizagapatam, Bay of Bengal, India. It is reported from many localities in the Indo-Pacific region.
