= Eubranchus yolandae =

Scientific classification
- Kingdom: Animalia
- Phylum: Mollusca
- Class: Gastropoda
- Order: Nudibranchia
- Suborder: Aeolidacea
- Family: Eubranchidae
- Genus: Eubranchus
- Species: E. yolandae

Binomial name
- Eubranchus yolandae Hermosillo & Valdés, 2007

Species of gastropod

Eubranchus yolandae is a species of sea slug or nudibranch, a marine gastropod mollusc in the family Eubranchidae.

== Distribution ==
This species was described from 16 m depth at Los Arcos, Bahía de Banderas, Jalisco, Mexico, tropical eastern Pacific. It has only been reported from the type locality.
