= Fireworks nudibranch =

Scientific classification
- Kingdom: Animalia
- Phylum: Mollusca
- Class: Gastropoda
- Order: Nudibranchia
- Suborder: Aeolidacea
- Family: Eubranchidae
- Genus: Eubranchus
- Species: E. sp. 4

Binomial name
- Eubranchus sp. 4

Species of gastropod

The fireworks nudibranch, Eubranchus sp. 4, as designated by Zsilavecz, 2007, is a species of sea slug or nudibranch, a marine gastropod mollusc in the family Eubranchidae. It is an aeolid nudibranch, which is known to occur off the South African coast. As at August 2010, it remained undescribed by science.

== Distribution ==
This species has to date only been found off South Africa, near Vulcan Rock, south of Hout Bay, off Cape Town in at least 18m of water. It appears to be endemic.

== Description ==
This is a rather small nudibranch, reaching 15 mm in total length. It is slender and white-bodied, and it is covered with white to red yellow-tipped cerata. The oral tentacles and rhinophores are white, smooth and short.

== Ecology ==
The egg ribbon of this species is a simple upright white coil.
