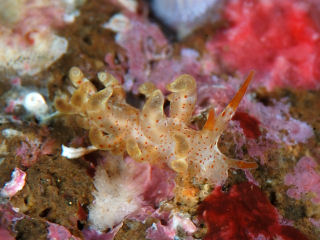

Scientific classification
- Kingdom: Animalia
- Phylum: Mollusca
- Class: Gastropoda
- Order: Nudibranchia
- Suborder: Aeolidacea
- Family: Eubranchidae
- Genus: Eubranchus
- Species: E. echizenicus

Binomial name
- Eubranchus echizenicus Baba, 1975

= Eubranchus echizenicus =

Species of gastropod

Eubranchus echizenicus is a species of sea slug or nudibranch, a marine gastropod mollusc in the family Eubranchidae.

== Distribution ==
This species was described from the Echizen Coast, Japan. It has been reported from Hachijo Islands and Omijima, Yamaguchi Prefecture, Japan, and possibly Moreton Bay, Queensland, Australia.
