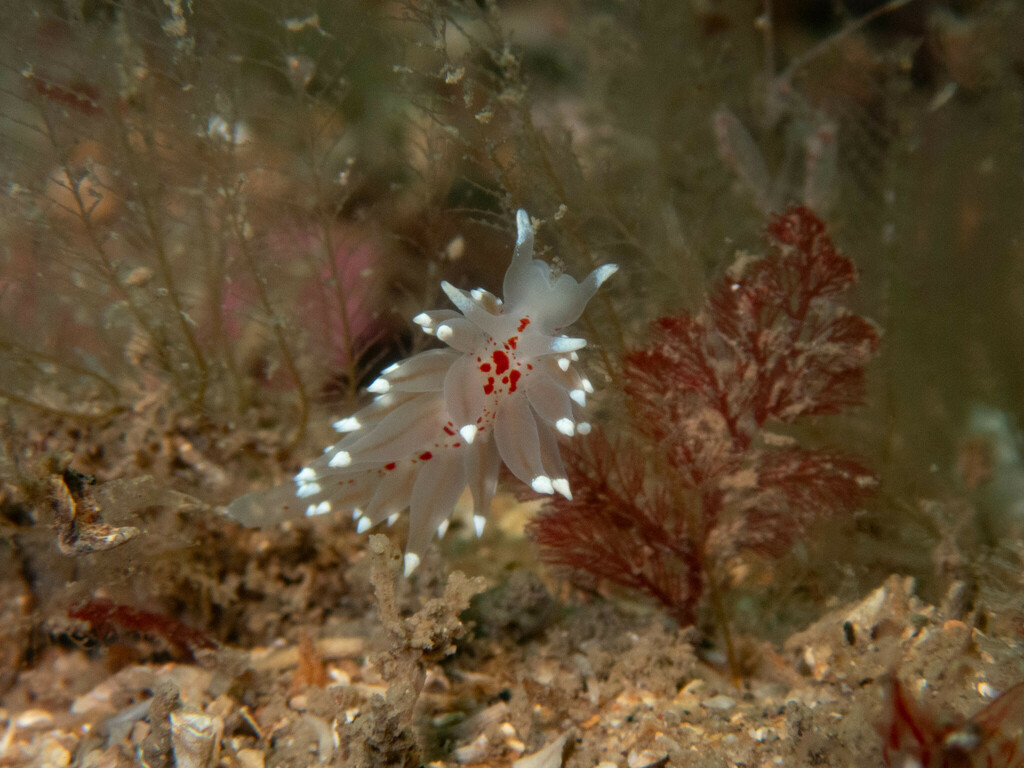

Scientific classification
- Kingdom: Animalia
- Phylum: Mollusca
- Class: Gastropoda
- Order: Nudibranchia
- Suborder: Aeolidacea
- Family: Eubranchidae
- Genus: Amphorina
- Species: A. linensis

Binomial name
- Amphorina linensis (García-Gómez, Cervera & García, 1990)

Synonyms
- Eubranchus linensis García-Gómez, Cervera & García, 1990

= Amphorina linensis =

Species of gastropod

Amphorina linensis is a species of sea slug or nudibranch, a marine gastropod mollusc in the family Eubranchidae. Several species of Eubranchus were transferred to Amphorina in 2020.

== Distribution ==
This species was described from Tarifa, Spain. It has been reported from the Netherlands and Portugal.
