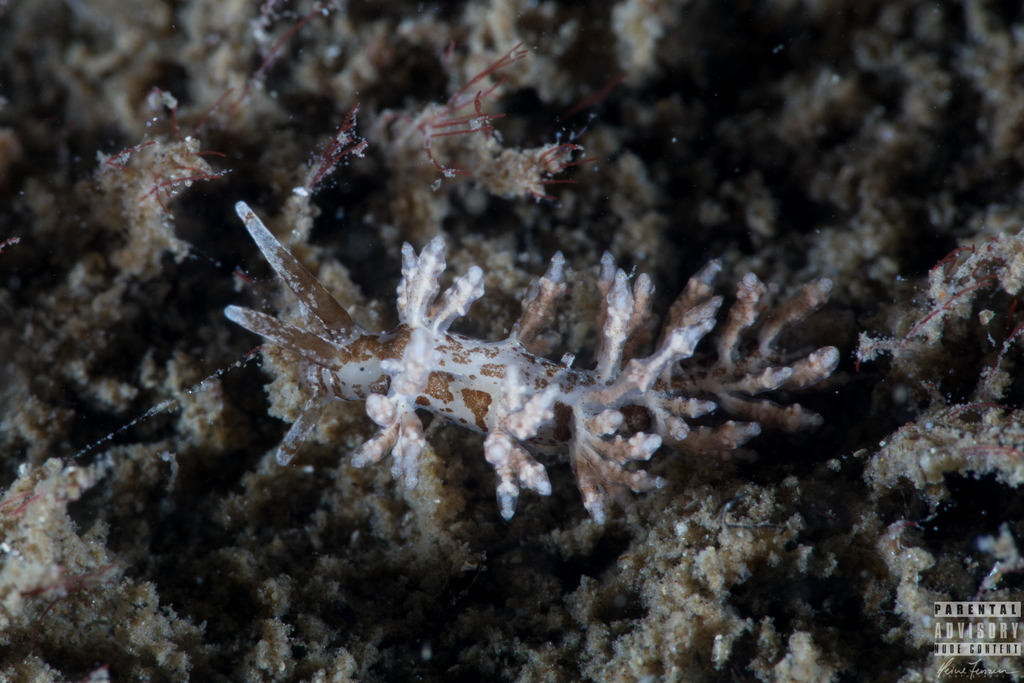

Scientific classification
- Kingdom: Animalia
- Phylum: Mollusca
- Class: Gastropoda
- Order: Nudibranchia
- Suborder: Aeolidacea
- Family: Eubranchidae
- Genus: Capellinia
- Species: C. fustifera

Binomial name
- Capellinia fustifera (Lovén, 1846)

Synonyms
- Tergipes fustifer Lovén, 1846

= Capellinia fustifera =

Species of gastropod

Capellinia fustifera is a species of sea slug or nudibranch, a marine gastropod mollusc in the family Eubranchidae.

== Distribution ==
This species was described from Bohüslan, Norway. It has also been reported from the Atlantic coast of France and the coasts of Great Britain and Ireland as Eubranchus doriae.
