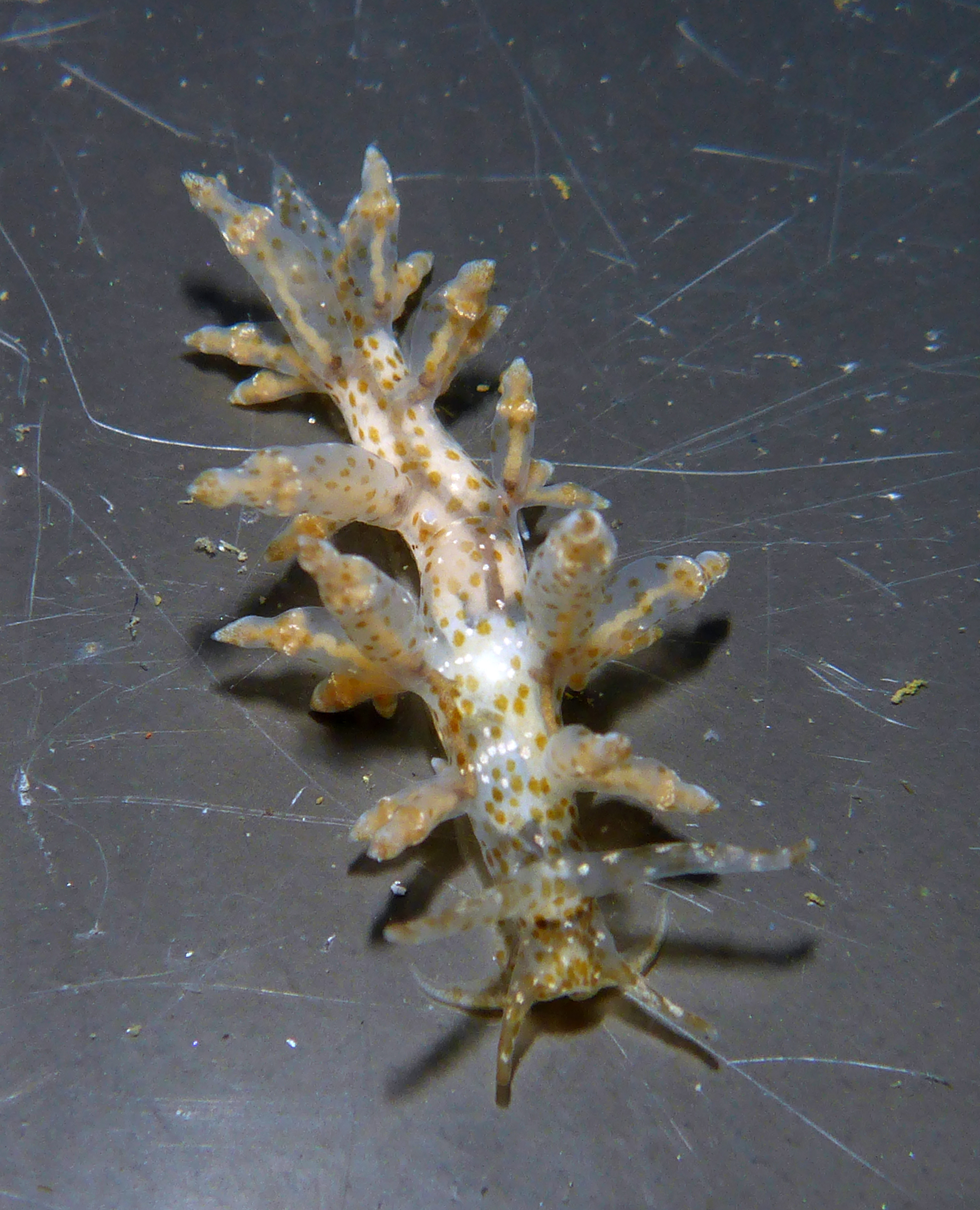

Scientific classification
- Kingdom: Animalia
- Phylum: Mollusca
- Class: Gastropoda
- Order: Nudibranchia
- Suborder: Aeolidacea
- Family: Eubranchidae
- Genus: Leostyletus
- Species: L. misakiensin

Binomial name
- Leostyletus misakiensin (Baba, 1960)

Synonyms
- Eubranchus misakiensis Baba, 1960 (basionym)

= Leostyletus misakiensis =

Species of gastropod

Leostyletus misakiensis, common name Misaki aeolid, is a species of sea slug or nudibranch, a marine gastropod mollusc in the family Eubranchidae.

== Distribution ==
This species was described from Misaki, Sagami Bay, on an Obelia colony, Japan. Additional specimens included in the original description were from Sargassum plants at Mukaishima, Seto Inland Sea. The species has been reported from British Columbia, but it is likely that several distinct species are involved. This species is also found in the San Francisco Bay, California, and in harbors in Princeton, California and Santa Cruz, California.
