= Galvinella adarensis =

Scientific classification
- Kingdom: Animalia
- Phylum: Mollusca
- Class: Gastropoda
- Order: Nudibranchia
- Suborder: Aeolidacea
- Family: Eubranchidae
- Genus: Galvinella
- Species: G. adarensis

Binomial name
- Galvinella adarensis Odhner, 1934

Synonyms
- Eubranchus adarensis Odhner, 1934

Species of gastropod

Galvinella adarensis is a species of sea slug or nudibranch, a marine gastropod mollusc in the family Eubranchidae. Members of the species are hermaphrodites. The species deposits their eggs on a substratum, where they eventually hatch into a larval stage, ultimately reaching adulthood.

== Distribution ==
This species was described from Cape Adare at the mouth of Robertson Bay, Antarctica in 82–92 m of water.
