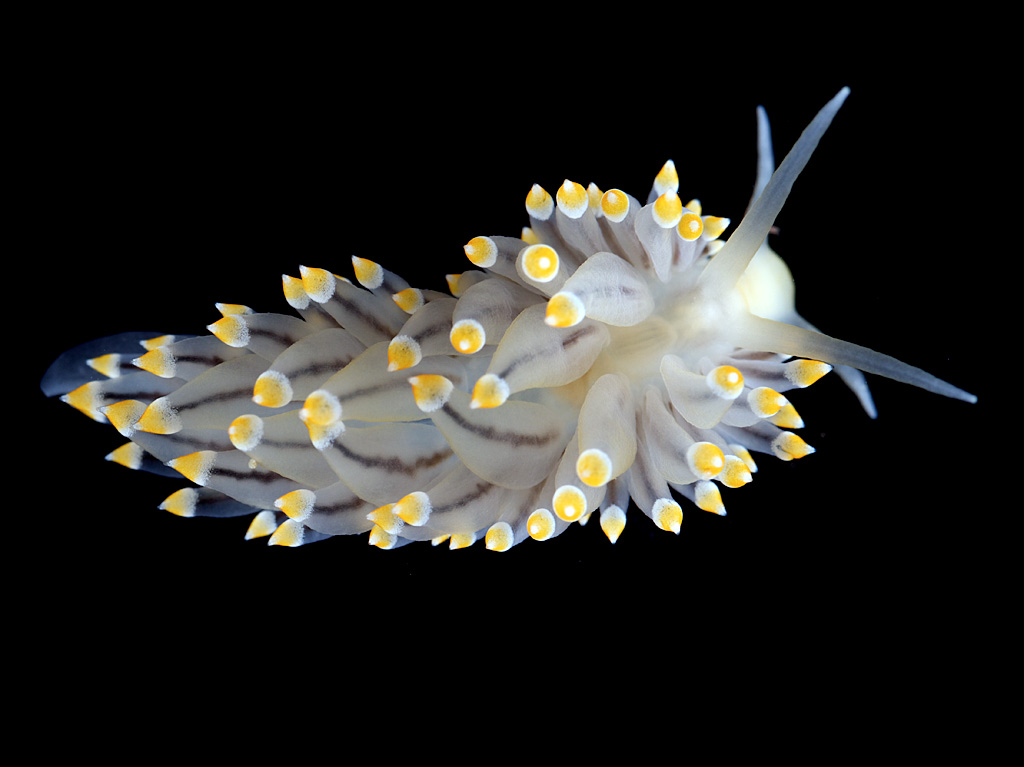
- The nudibranch Eubranchus tricolor, Firth of Lorne, Scotland.

Scientific classification
- Kingdom: Animalia
- Phylum: Mollusca
- Class: Gastropoda
- Order: Nudibranchia
- Suborder: Aeolidacea
- Family: Eubranchidae
- Genus: Eubranchus
- Species: E. tricolor

Binomial name
- Eubranchus tricolor Forbes, 1838

Synonyms
- Egalvina viridula (Bergh, 1873); Eolis amethystina Alder & Hancock, 1845; Eolis tricolor (Forbes, 1838); Eolis violacea Alder & Hancock, 1844; Galvina tricolor (Forbes, 1838); Galvina viridula Bergh, 1873

= Eubranchus tricolor =

Painted balloon aeolis

Species of gastropod

Eubranchus tricolor, common name the painted balloon aeolis, is a species of sea slug, an aeolid nudibranch, a marine gastropod mollusc in the family Eubranchidae. It is the type species of the genus Eubranchus.

== Taxonomy ==
According to Pruvot-Fol (1954) the species Amphorina alberti Quatrefages, 1844 is a synonym of Eubranchus tricolor. Opinion 774 of the ICZN decided that Amphorina alberti was a synonym of Eubranchus farrani and suppressed the names Amphorina and A. alberti.

== Distribution ==
This species was first described from the Isle of Man, Irish Sea, United Kingdom. It has subsequently been reported from all around Britain and Ireland, as well as from continental coasts from Norway to Portugal and into the Mediterranean Sea.

== Description ==
This aeolid nudibranch is translucent white with rings of white, yellow and white at the tips of the cerata. The cerata are swollen and translucent with a narrow digestive gland which is usually dull purple in colour. There is a superficial resemblance to Janolus cristatus.

The maximum recorded body length is 10 mm.

== Ecology ==
Minimum recorded depth is 128 m. Maximum recorded depth is 128 m.

Eubranchus tricolor feeds on several species of hydroids including Nemertesia antennina and Nemertesia ramosa, family Plumulariidae.
