= Galvinella glacialis =

Scientific classification
- Kingdom: Animalia
- Phylum: Mollusca
- Class: Gastropoda
- Order: Nudibranchia
- Suborder: Aeolidacea
- Family: Eubranchidae
- Genus: Galvinella
- Species: G. glacialis

Binomial name
- Galvinella glacialis (Thiele, 1912)

Synonyms
- Eubranchus glacialis Thiele, 1912; Galvina glacialis Thiele, 1912

Species of gastropod

Galvinella glacialis is a species of sea slug or nudibranch, a marine gastropod mollusc in the family Eubranchidae.

== Distribution ==
This species was described from the Gauss-Station, Davis Sea, Antarctica. It has been reported from McMurdo Sound.
