= Nihonbranchus horii =

Scientific classification
- Kingdom: Animalia
- Phylum: Mollusca
- Class: Gastropoda
- Order: Nudibranchia
- Suborder: Aeolidacea
- Family: Eubranchidae
- Genus: Nihonbranchus
- Species: N. horii

Binomial name
- Nihonbranchus horii Baba, 1960

Synonyms
- Amphorina horii Baba, 1960; Eubranchus horii Baba, 1960

Species of gastropod

Nihonbranchus horii is a species of sea slug or nudibranch, a marine gastropod mollusc in the family Eubranchidae.

== Distribution ==
This species was described from Hayama, Sagami Bay, Japan. Additional specimens included in the original description were from Tannowa, Osaka Bay; from among a hydroid colony on Ecklonia leaves at Mukaishima, Seto Inland Sea and from Abugashima, Toyama Bay. It has been photographed at Kurosaki, Toyama Bay.
