= Hermitage of Mãe de Deus =

- Ermida de Mãe de Deus
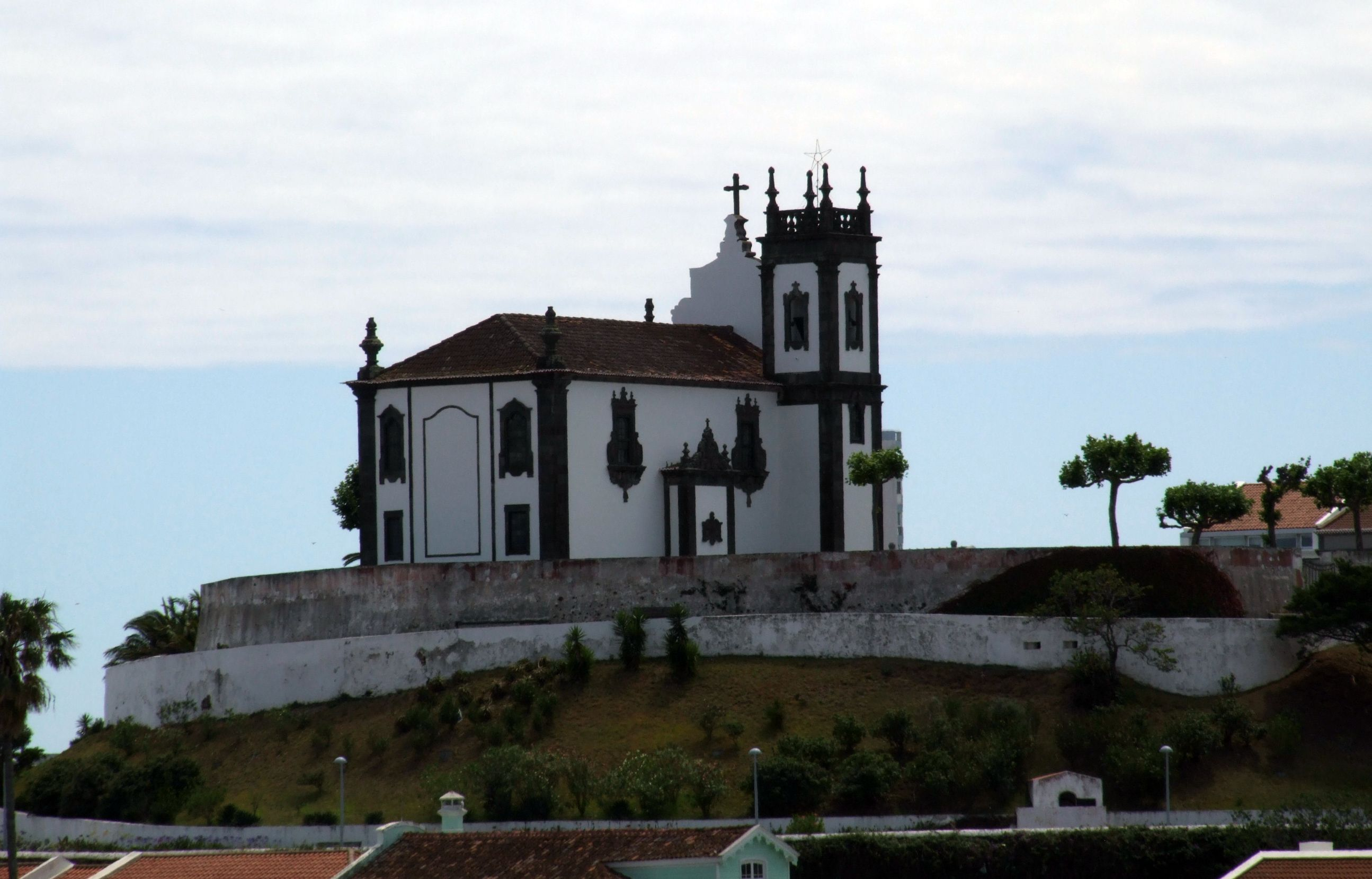
- A perspective of the hermitage of Mãe de Deus located on the hilltop of the same name

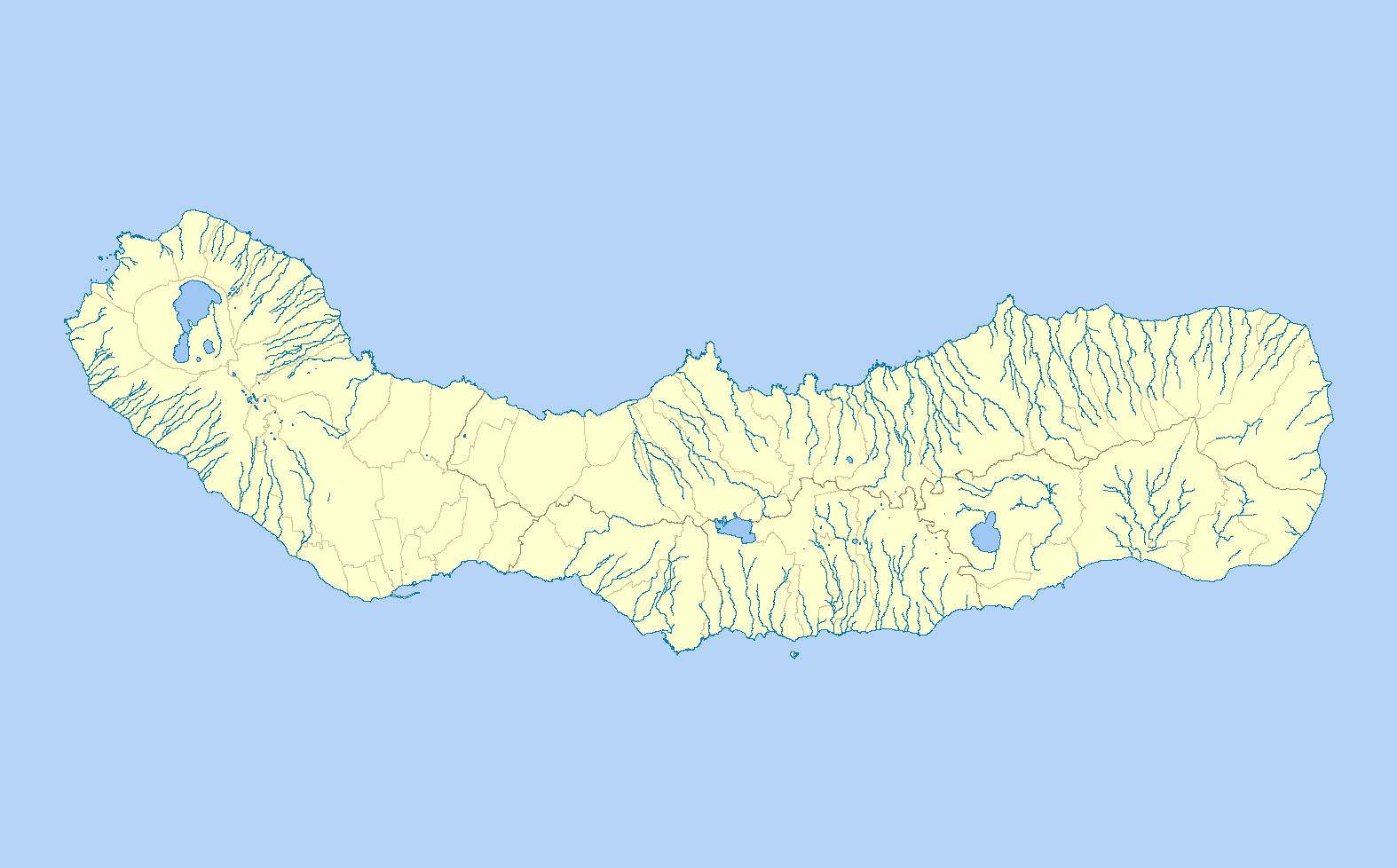
- Location within São Miguel

General information
- Type: Hermitage
- Architectural style: Medieval
- Location: São Pedro, Ponta Delgada, Portugal
- Coordinates: 37°44′37.91″N 25°39′38.65″W
- Owner: Regional Government of the Azores

Technical details
- Material: Basalt

Design and construction
- Architect: Norberto Correia

The Hermitage of Mãe de Deus (Portuguese: Ermida de Mãe de Deus), is a hermitage situated on the hilltop of Ladeira da Mãe de Deus in the civil parish of São Pedro in the municipality of Ponta Delgada.

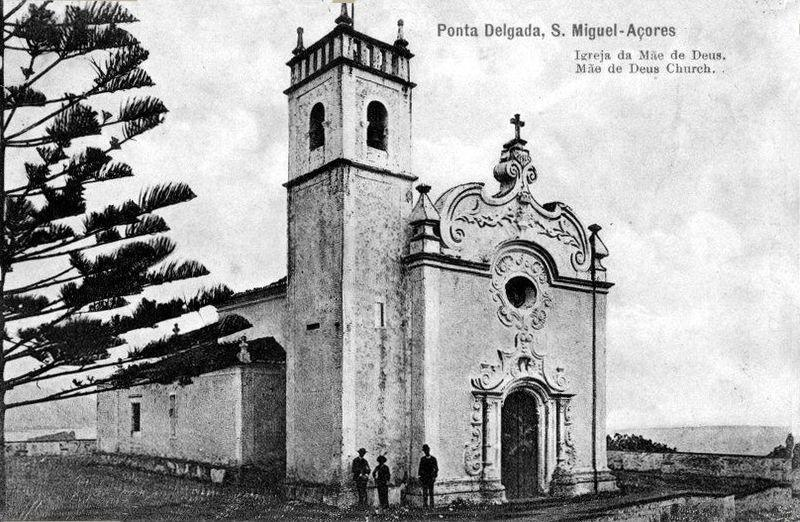
The Baroque era facade of the Chapel of Mãe de Deus at the turn of the century

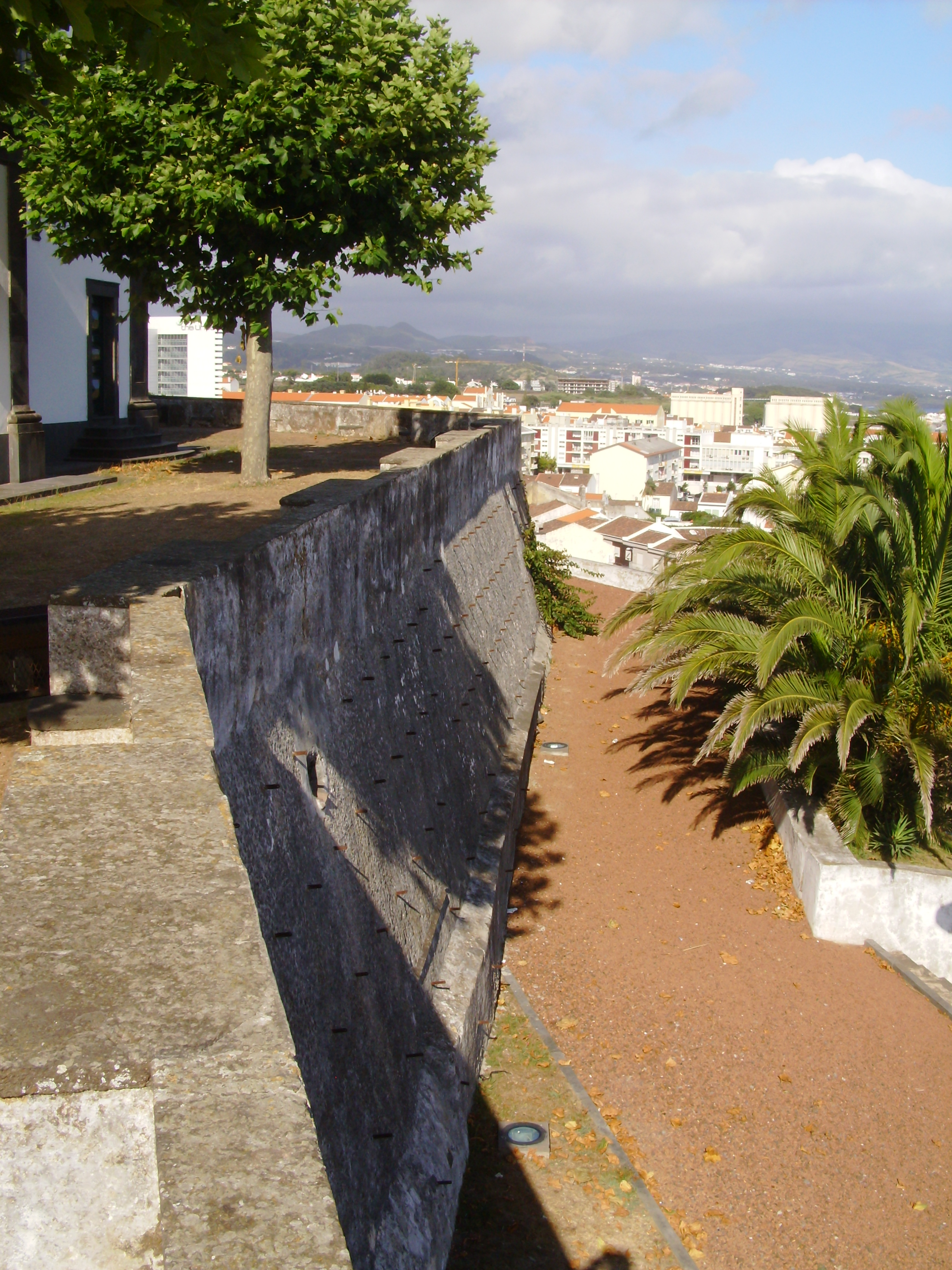
The walls of the old Fort of Mãe de Deus, on which the hermitage is built

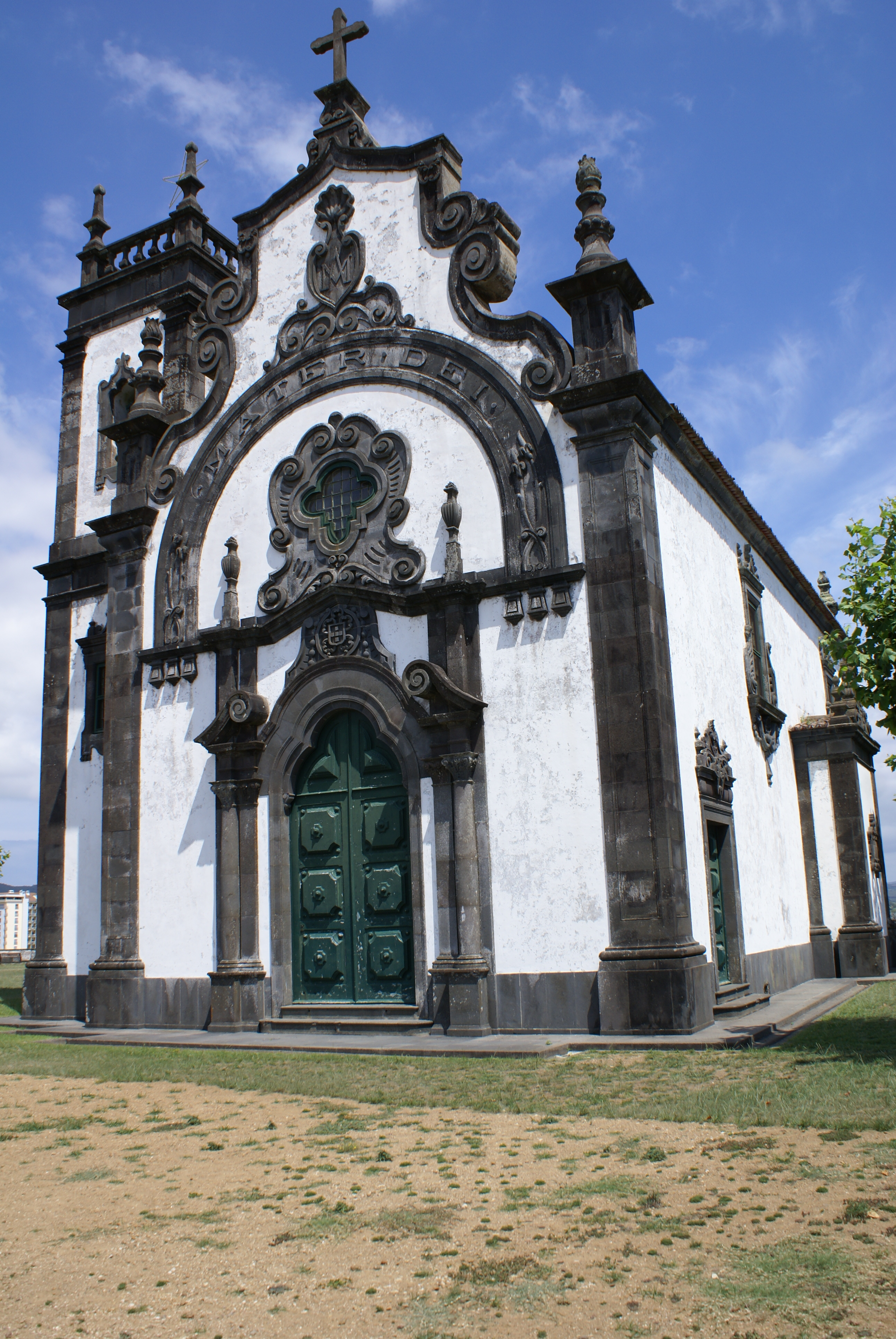
The decorative front facade of the church, with many of the elements that distinguish it
