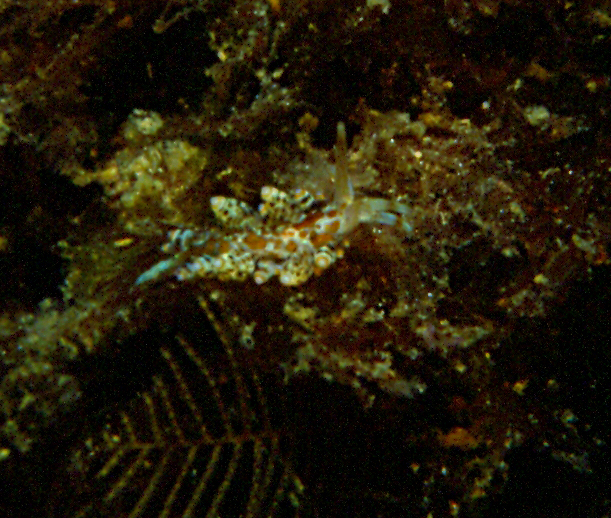

Scientific classification
- Kingdom: Animalia
- Phylum: Mollusca
- Class: Gastropoda
- Order: Nudibranchia
- Suborder: Aeolidacea
- Family: Eubranchidae
- Genus: Nudibranchus
- Species: N. exiguus

Binomial name
- Nudibranchus exiguus (Alder & A. Hancock, 1848)

Synonyms
- Aeolis exigua Alder & Hancock, 1848; Eolis exigua Alder & Hancock, 1848; Eubranchus exiguus Alder & Hancock, 1848; Galvina exiguus Alder & Hancock, 1848; Capellinia exiguus Alder & Hancock, 1848

= Nudibranchus exiguus =

Species of gastropod

Nudibranchus exiguus is a species of small sea slug, an aeolid nudibranch, a marine gastropod mollusc in the family Eubranchidae.

== Distribution ==
The type locality is the harbour at Fowey, in England. It is found all round the British Isles and from the Arctic and Scandinavia to the Mediterranean Sea.

== Description ==
Nudibranchus exiguus was originally discovered and described (under the name Eolis exigua) in 1848, by the British malacologists Joshua Alder and Albany Hancock.

The original text (the type description) reads as follows:

Eolis exigua.

Body slender, yellowish white with olive or pale brown markings. Dorsal tentacles linear, moderately long, with a ring of brown near the top: oral tentacles about one-third shorter and of the same colour. Branchiae generally in a single series of five or six on each side, but in fine full-grown specimens there are two on each side in front or sometimes a cluster of three, the third being placed a little behind the others. There is also frequently an additional papilla united with some of the others behind. They are ovate, tapering abruptly to a point: there is a ring of olive or yellowish brown, sometimes reddish, at a short distance from the apex, and frequently two others, less perfect below, but generally these are only indicated by brown spots or streaks. The body is also blotched and spotted with brown, and there is frequently an interrupted line of that colour on each side. Foot rounded in front and nearly linear, with a slight margin of pale brown at the sides. Length 1½ to 2 lines.

This species was found in considerable abundance in Fowey Harbour on Laminaria saccharina. Mr. Cocks has also found it at Falmouth. It is allied to Eolis despecta, some specimens of which were found in company with it, but it is easily distinguished by not having the waved dorsal line of the latter species. It appears to be the Tergipes lacinulatus of Professor Lovén, but

we cannot concur in referring it to the Limax tergipes of Forskahl (Doris lacinulatus, Gmelin).

The maximum recorded length is 8 mm.

== Habitat ==
Minimum recorded depth is 0 m. Maximum recorded depth is 10 m.
