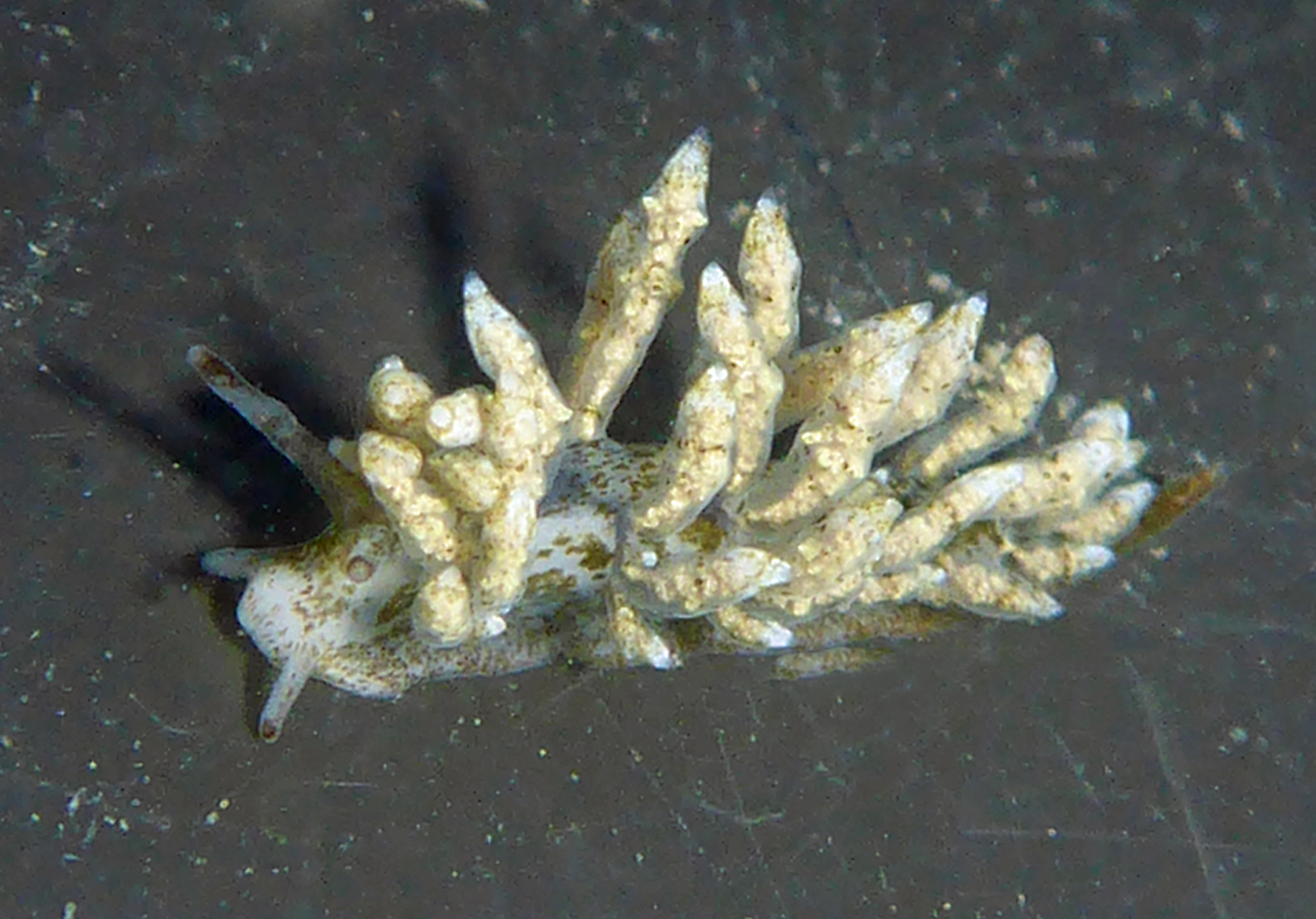

Scientific classification
- Kingdom: Animalia
- Phylum: Mollusca
- Class: Gastropoda
- Order: Nudibranchia
- Suborder: Aeolidacea
- Family: Eubranchidae
- Genus: Eubranchus
- Species: E. rustyus

Binomial name
- Eubranchus rustyus (Er. Marcus, 1961

Synonyms
- Capellinia rustya Er. Marcus, 1961

= Eubranchus rustyus =

Homely aeolid

Species of gastropod

Eubranchus rustyus, the homely aeolid, is a species of sea slug or nudibranch, a marine gastropod mollusc in the family Eubranchidae.

== Distribution ==
This species was described from Monterey Bay, 36°36′20″N 121°53′04″W, California. It is considered by most authors to be a synonym of Eubranchus occidentalis.

== Biology ==
This nudibranch feeds on the hydroids Obelia and Plumularia.
