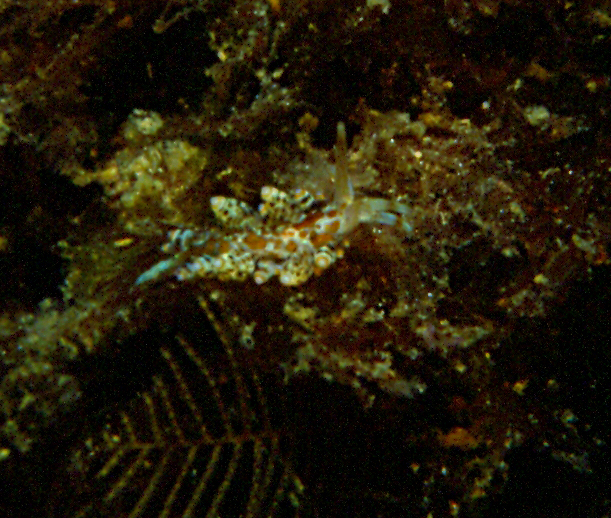
- Nudibranchus exiguus

Scientific classification
- Kingdom: Animalia
- Phylum: Mollusca
- Class: Gastropoda
- Order: Nudibranchia
- Suborder: Aeolidacea
- Family: Eubranchidae
- Genus: Nudibranchus; Martynov, 1998

Type species
- Eolis exigua Alder & Hancock, 1848

= Nudibranchus =

Genus of molluscs

Nudibranchus is a genus of aeolid nudibranchs, belonging to the family Eubranchidae, and known from the oceans around New England and Northern Europe.

== Etymology ==
The genus name, Nudibranchus, like the order Nudibranchia itself comes from the Latin nudus (meaning "naked") and Ancient Greek βράγχια/bránkhia (meaning "gills").

== Taxonomy ==
Nudibranchus contains the following species:

- Nudibranchus exiguus
- Nudibranchus scintillans

Synonym

- Nudibranchus rupium (Møller, 1842): synonym of Eubranchulus rupium (Møller, 1842)
