= Corruptobranchus sanjuanensis =

Scientific classification
- Kingdom: Animalia
- Phylum: Mollusca
- Class: Gastropoda
- Order: Nudibranchia
- Suborder: Aeolidacea
- Family: Eubranchidae
- Genus: Corruptobranchus
- Species: C. sanjuanensis

Binomial name
- Corruptobranchus sanjuanensis Roller, 1972

Synonyms
- Eubranchus sanjuanensis Roller, 1972

Species of gastropod

Corruptobranchus sanjuanensis is a species of sea slug or nudibranch, a marine gastropod mollusc in the family Eubranchidae.

== Distribution ==
This species was described from Friday Harbour, San Juan Island, Washington. It is reported as far north as Mountain Point, Ketchikan, Alaska. It is reported to be fairly common in British Columbia, Canada in two colour forms. It has also been reported from Cobscook Bay on the Atlantic coast of North America.
