= Capellinia prietoi =

Scientific classification
- Kingdom: Animalia
- Phylum: Mollusca
- Class: Gastropoda
- Order: Nudibranchia
- Suborder: Aeolidacea
- Family: Eubranchidae
- Genus: Capellinia
- Species: C. prietoi

Binomial name
- Capellinia prietoi Llera & Ortea, 1981

Synonyms
- Eubranchus prietoi Llera & Ortea, 1981

Species of gastropod

Capellinia prietoi is a species of sea slug or nudibranch, a marine gastropod mollusc in the family Eubranchidae.

== Distribution ==
This species was described from Verdicio, Asturias, Spain, 43°35′N 05°50′W, in the NE Atlantic Ocean. It has been reported from Arcachon Bay, France and Senegal as well as Ghana.

== Biology ==
Capellinia prietoi was found with the hydroid Plumularia setacea, which is presumed to be its food. It lays short egg coils across the midrib of the hydroid.
