= Corruptobranchus odhneri =

Scientific classification
- Kingdom: Animalia
- Phylum: Mollusca
- Class: Gastropoda
- Order: Nudibranchia
- Suborder: Aeolidacea
- Family: Eubranchidae
- Genus: Corruptobranchus
- Species: C. odhneri

Binomial name
- Corruptobranchus odhneri (Derjugin & Gurjanova, 1926)

Synonyms
- Amphorina odhneri Derjugin & Gurjanova, 1926; Eubranchus odhneri Derjugin & Gurjanova, 1926; Galvina odhneri Derjugin & Gurjanova, 1926

Species of mollusc

Corruptobranchus odhneri is a species of sea slug or nudibranch, a marine gastropod mollusc in the family Eubranchidae.

== Distribution ==
This species was described from Russia.
