= Capellinia steinbecki =

Scientific classification
- Kingdom: Animalia
- Phylum: Mollusca
- Class: Gastropoda
- Order: Nudibranchia
- Suborder: Aeolidacea
- Family: Eubranchidae
- Genus: Capellinia
- Species: C. steinbecki

Binomial name
- Capellinia steinbecki Behrens, 1987

Synonyms
- Eubranchus steinbecki Behrens, 1987

Species of gastropod

Capellinia steinbecki is a species of sea slug or nudibranch, a marine gastropod mollusc in the family Eubranchidae.

== Distribution ==
This species was described from specimens collected from boat floats at Dana Landing, Mission Bay, San Diego, 32°42′N 117°33′W and intertidally at Malibu, 34°00′N 118°47′W, California, United States. It has been reported from Palos Verdes south to La Paz, Baja California Sur, Mexico.
