= Leostyletus =

Scientific classification
- Kingdom: Animalia
- Phylum: Mollusca
- Class: Gastropoda
- Order: Nudibranchia
- Suborder: Aeolidacea
- Family: Eubranchidae
- Genus: Leostyletus; Martynov, 1998

Type species
- Leostyletus misakiensis (Baba, 1960)

Genus of gastropods

Leostyletus is a genus of sea slugs, specifically of aeolid nudibranchs in the family Eubranchidae.

== Species ==
Species in this genus include:

- Leostyletus misakiensis (Baba, 1960)
- Leostyletus pseudomisakiensis Martynov, 1998
