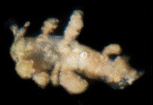
- live Eubranchus conicla

Scientific classification
- Kingdom: Animalia
- Phylum: Mollusca
- Class: Gastropoda
- Order: Nudibranchia
- Suborder: Aeolidacea
- Family: Eubranchidae
- Genus: Eubranchus
- Species: E. conicla

Binomial name
- Eubranchus conicla (Er. Marcus, 1958)

Synonyms
- Capellinia conicla Er. Marcus, 1958 (basionym); Eubranchus coniclus (Er. Marcus, 1958) (misspelling); Eubranchus convenientis Ortea & Caballer, 2002

= Eubranchus conicla =

Species of gastropod

Eubranchus conicla is a species of sea slug or nudibranch, a marine gastropod mollusc in the family Eubranchidae.

== Taxonomy ==
Eubranchus convenientis Ortea & Caballer, 2002 was described from Manzanillo, Limón, Costa Rica. Eubranchus convenientis is considered as a synonym of Eubranchus conicla.

== Distribution ==
This species was described from Ubatuba and Ilhabela, São Paulo state, Brazil. It has been reported from Florida, Honduras, Costa Rica, Venezuela, Jamaica, Barbados, Tobago, Brazil and Panama.

== Description ==
Body is elongate. Rhinophores are smooth. Oral tentacles are short. Cerata are tuberculate, few in number, arranged in two simple rows. Background color is translucent gray or brown with numerous white dots. Rhinophores and oral tentacles are sometimes ringed with brown. Cerata are white, sometimes with brown or green spots. The maximum recorded body length is 4 mm.

== Ecology ==
Minimum recorded depth is 0 m. Maximum recorded depth is 3 m. Found on Sargassum in Panama.
