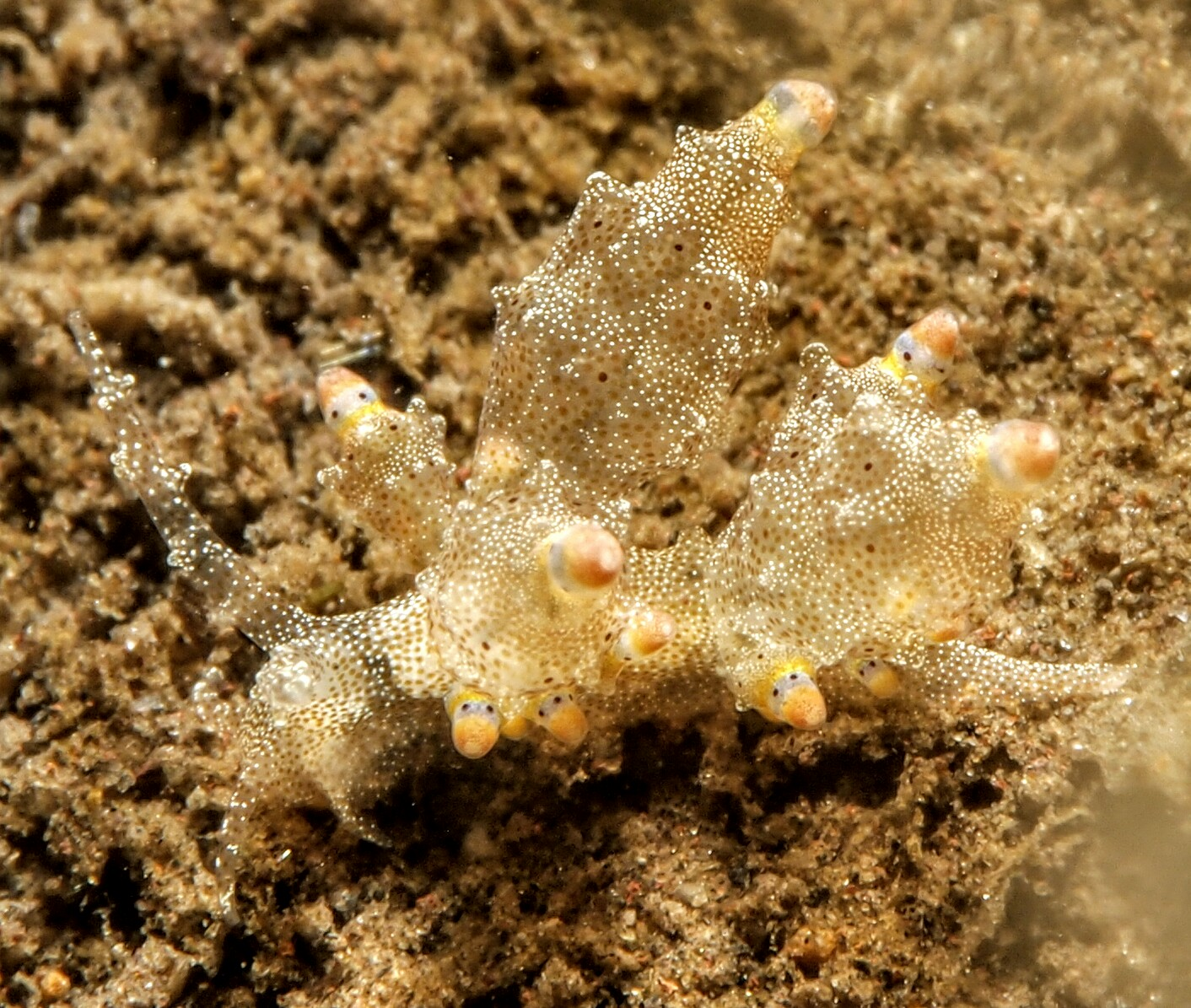

Scientific classification
- Kingdom: Animalia
- Phylum: Mollusca
- Class: Gastropoda
- Order: Nudibranchia
- Suborder: Aeolidacea
- Family: Eubranchidae
- Genus: Produnga
- Species: P. rubropunctata

Binomial name
- Produnga rubropunctata Edmunds, 1969

Synonyms
- Eubranchus rubropunctatus Edmunds, 1969

= Produnga rubropunctata =

Species of gastropod

Produnga rubropunctata is a species of sea slug or nudibranch, a marine gastropod mollusc in the family Eubranchidae.

== Distribution ==
This species was described from among roots of eel grass (Cymodocea ciliata) at Oyster bay, Dar-es-Salaam, Tanzania. It has been reported from Heron Island, Queensland, Australia.
