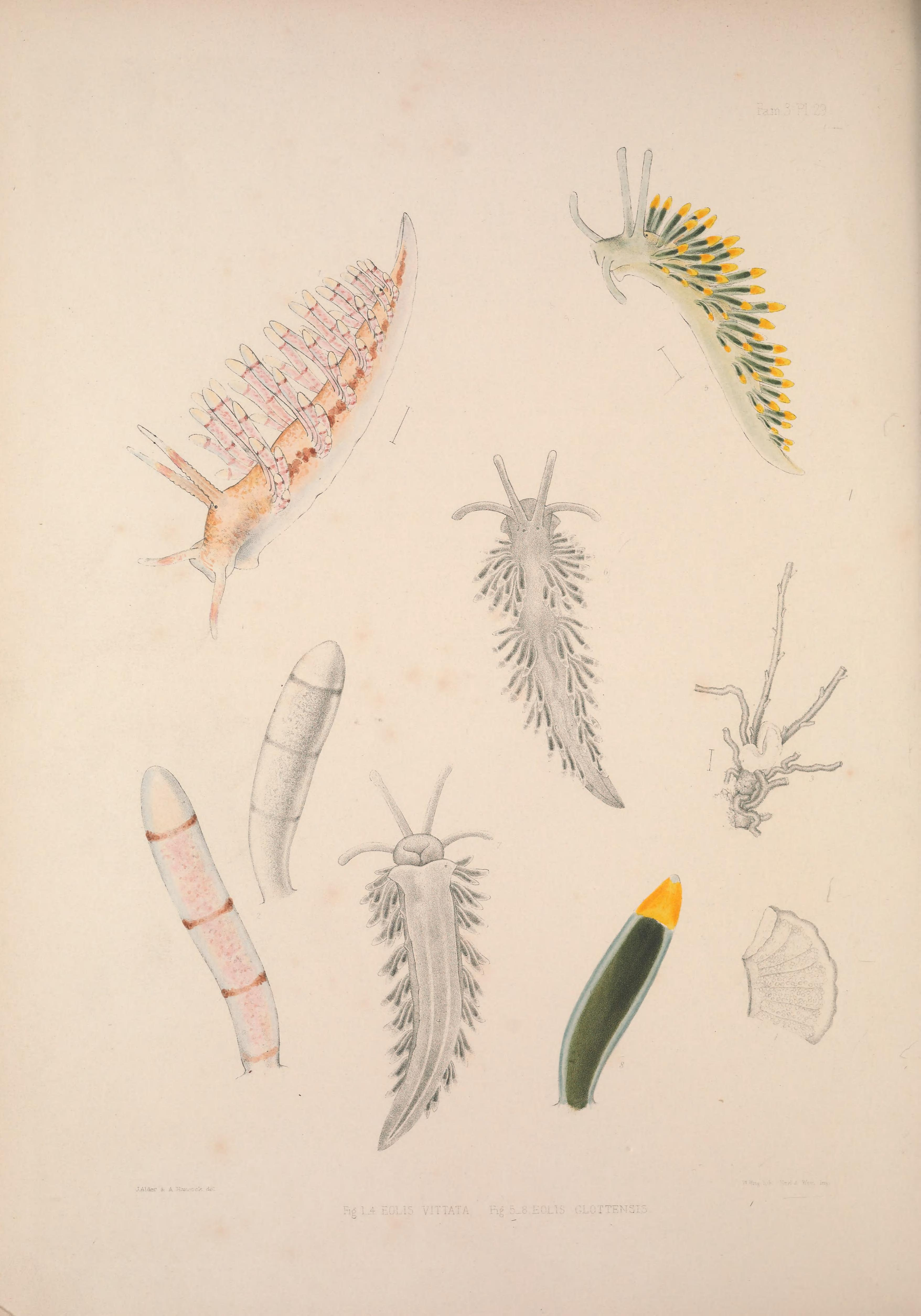
- Plate from Alder & Hancock (1845-1855)

Scientific classification
- Kingdom: Animalia
- Phylum: Mollusca
- Class: Gastropoda
- Order: Nudibranchia
- Suborder: Aeolidacea
- Family: Eubranchidae
- Genus: Capellinia
- Species: C. vittata

Binomial name
- Capellinia vittata (Alder & A. Hancock, 1842)

Synonyms
- List: Cratena vittata (Alder & Hancock, 1842); Eolis cingulata Alder & Hancock, 1847; Eolis hystrix Alder & Hancock, 1842; Eolis hyxtrix Alder & Hancock, 1842; Eolis vittata Alder & Hancock, 1842; Eubranchus cingulatus Alder & Hancock, 1847; Eubranchus vittatus Alder & Hancock, 1847; Galvina cingulata Alder & Hancock, 1842; Galvina vittata Alder & Hancock, 1842

= Capellinia vittata =

Species of gastropod

Capellinia vittata is a species of sea slug or nudibranch, a marine gastropod mollusc in the family Eubranchidae.

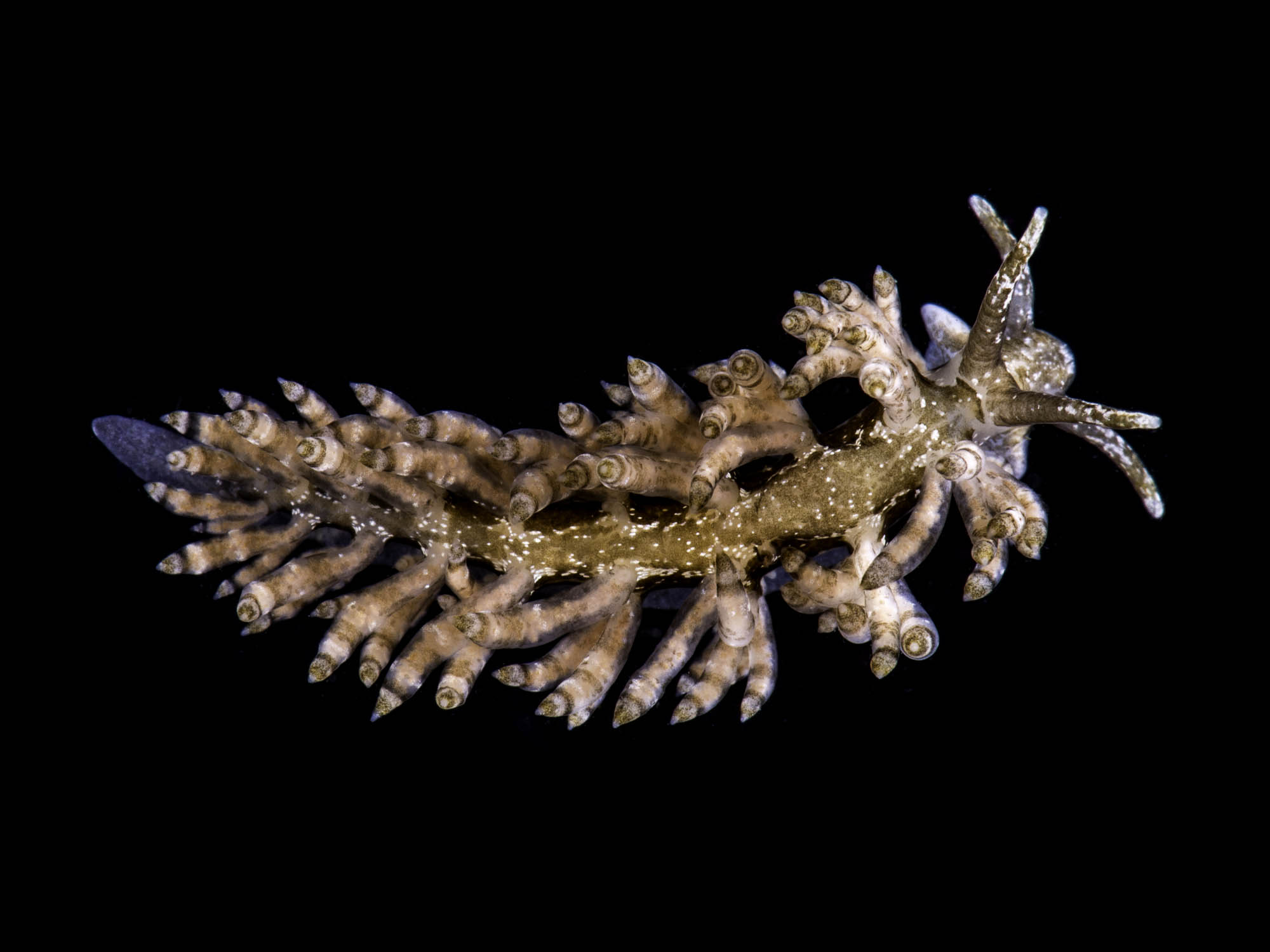
The nudibranch Capellinia vittata, Kione ny Halby, Isle of Man

== Description ==
(Original description) The colour of the slender body of the snail is pale buff speckled with fawn-colour. Its head is rather large and truncated in front. The dorsal tentaculaare slightly conical, wrinkled, fawn-coloured, with pale tips. The oral tentacula are rather shorter than the dorsal ones and of the same colour. The branchiae are somewhat clavate, long, with obtuse terminations, very pale fawn-coloured, with three darker bands of the same colour. They are set in six or seven distant rows down the sides, largest in front, four to seven in each row.

== Distribution ==
This species was described from deep water, off Cullercoats, England. It has been reported from the Atlantic coasts of Europe from Norway south to Galicia, Spain.
