= Capellinia doriae =

Scientific classification
- Kingdom: Animalia
- Phylum: Mollusca
- Class: Gastropoda
- Order: Nudibranchia
- Suborder: Aeolidacea
- Family: Eubranchidae
- Genus: Capellinia
- Species: C. doriae

Binomial name
- Capellinia doriae Trinchese, 1874

Synonyms
- Eubranchus doriae (Trinchese, 1874); Tergipes doriae (Trinchese, 1874)

Species of gastropod

Capellinia doriae is a species of sea slug or nudibranch, a marine gastropod mollusc in the family Eubranchidae.

== Distribution ==
This species was described from Genova, Italy. It has also been reported in error from the Atlantic coast of France and the coasts of Great Britain and Ireland but these records refer to a closely related species, Capellinia fustifera.
