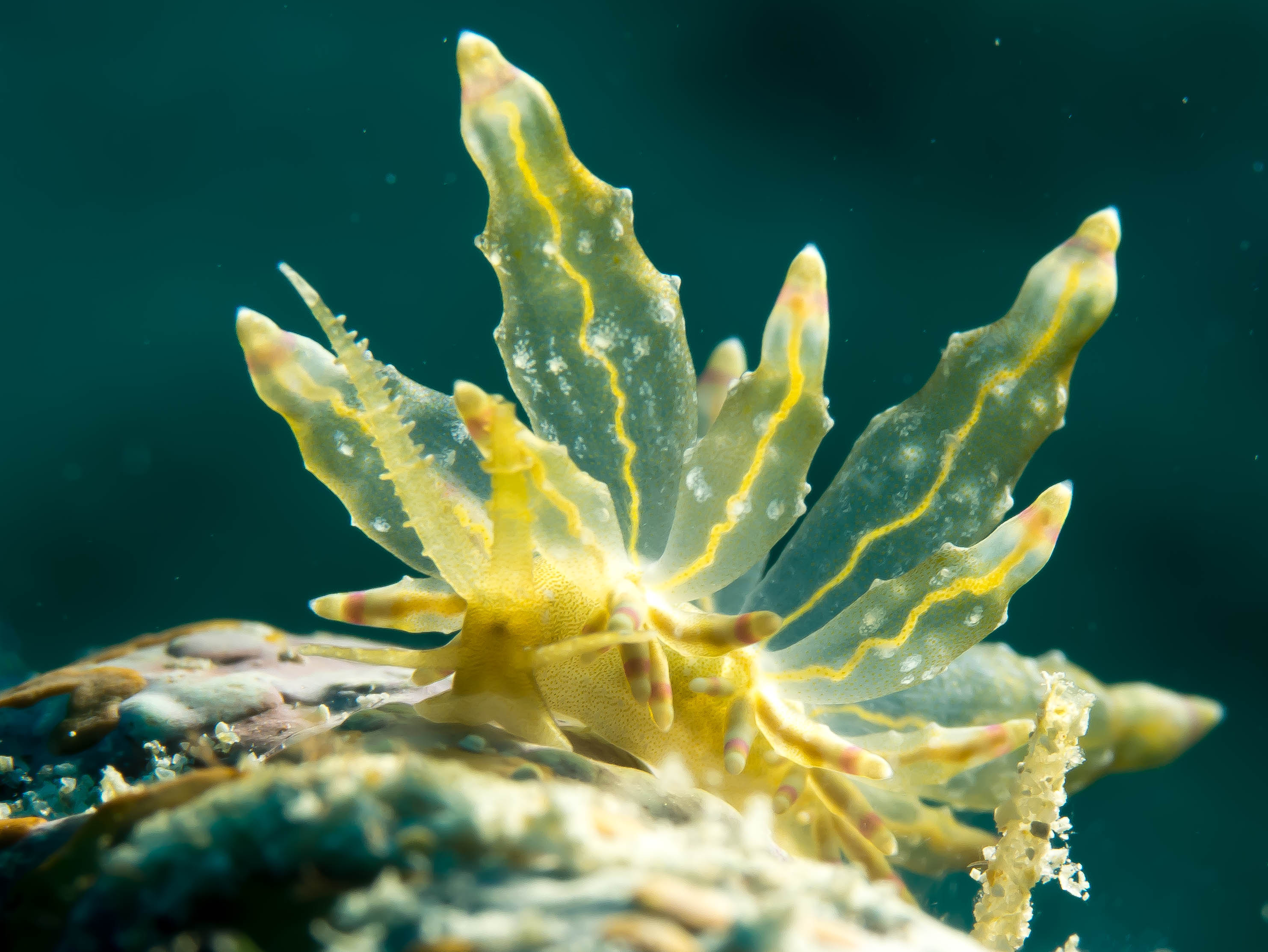

Scientific classification
- Kingdom: Animalia
- Phylum: Mollusca
- Class: Gastropoda
- Order: Nudibranchia
- Suborder: Aeolidacea
- Family: Eubranchidae
- Genus: Annulorhina
- Species: A. mandapamensis

Binomial name
- Annulorhina mandapamensis (Rao, 1968)

Synonyms
- Eubranchus mandapamensis K. P. Rao, 1968

= Annulorhina mandapamensis =

Species of gastropod

Annulorhina mandapamensis is a species of sea slug or nudibranch, a marine gastropod mollusc in the family Eubranchidae.

== Distribution ==
This species was described from the Gulf of Mannar, India. It has been reported from Ratnagiri, Maharashtra, India. Animals from Thailand are slightly different but are currently considered to be the same species.
