= São Pedro (Ponta Delgada) =

- Civil parish
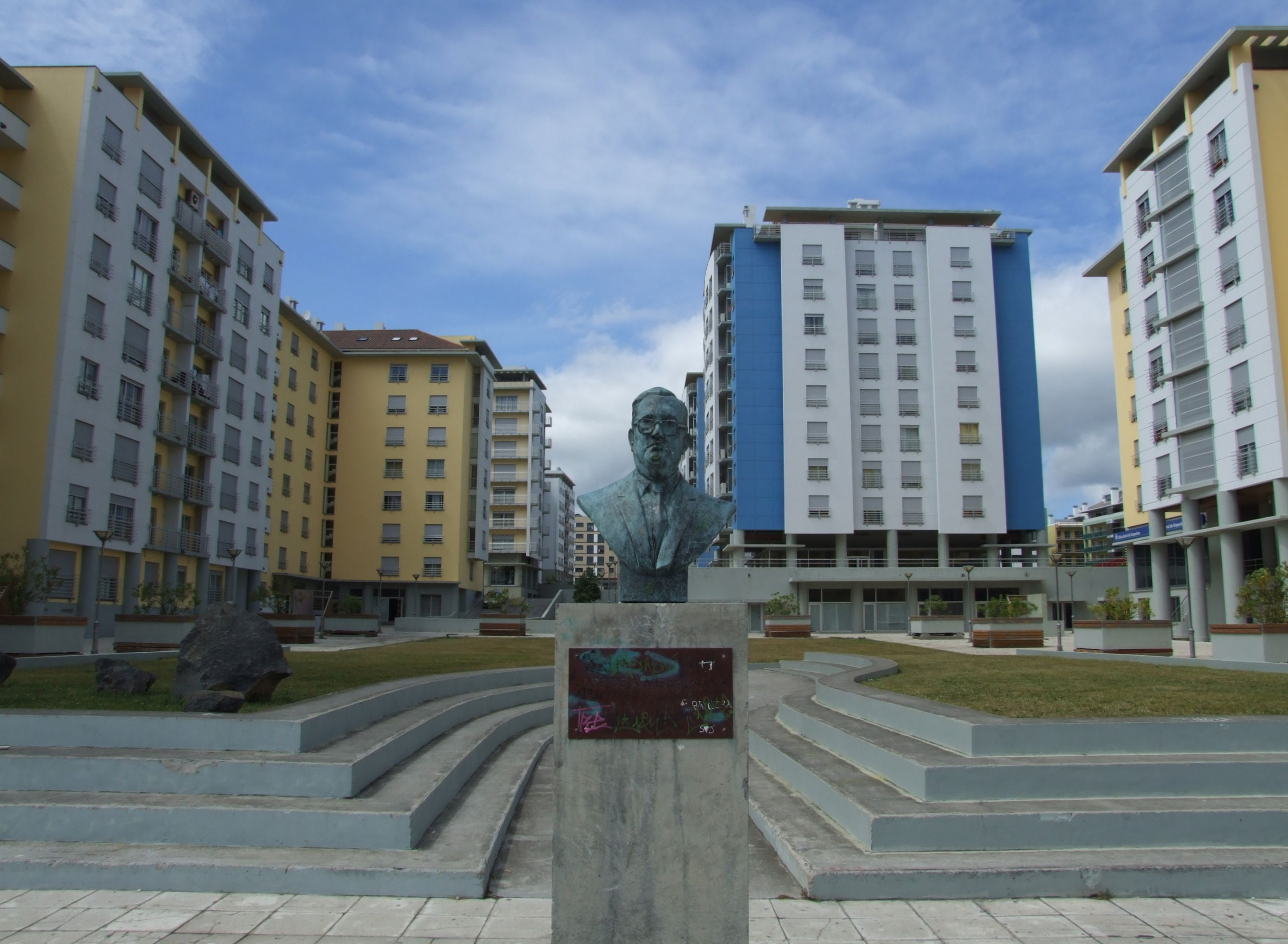
- A small plaza along the densely populated Avenida D. João III, an area of condominiums and apartments most recently constructed within the past 10 years

- Location of the civil parish of São Pedro within the municipality of Ponta Delgada
- Coordinates: 37°45′2″N 25°39′29″W
- Country: Portugal
- Auton. region: Azores
- Island: São Miguel
- Municipality: Ponta Delgada

Area
  - Total: 2.89 km^{2} (1.12 sq mi)
- Elevation: 47 m (154 ft)

Population (2011)
  - Total: 7,742
  - Density: 2,680/km^{2} (6,940/sq mi)
- Time zone: UTC−01:00 (AZOT)
  - Summer (DST): UTC+00:00 (AZOST)
- Postal code: 9500-322
- Area code: 292
- Patron: São Pedro

São Pedro (Portuguese for Saint Peter) is the easternmost civil parish in the municipality of Ponta Delgada on the island of São Miguel in the archipelago of the Azores. It is part of the historic downtown of Ponta Delgada. The population in 2011 was 7,742, in an area of 2.89 km^{2}. The parish was first incorporated in 1976.

== History ==
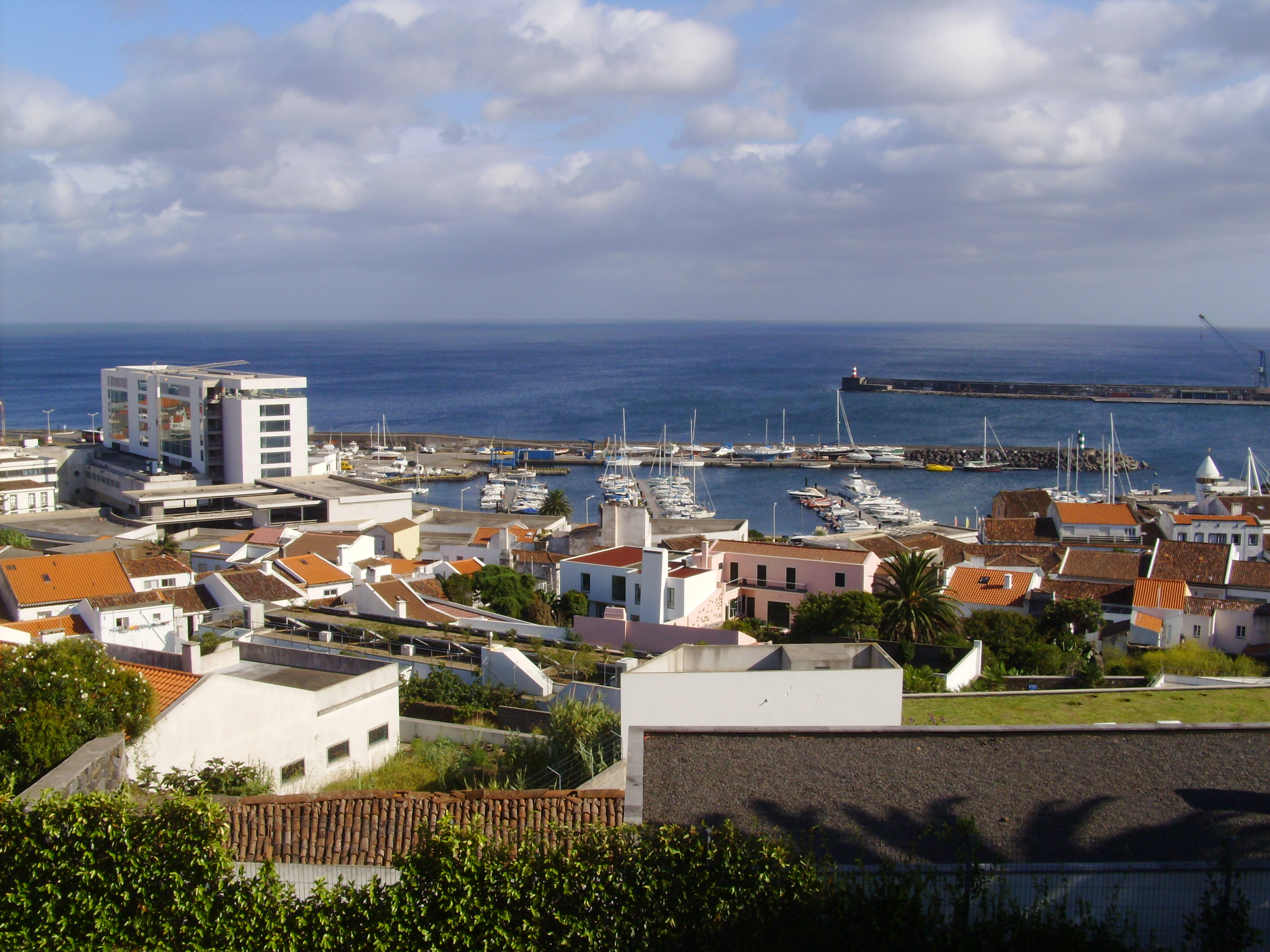
A view of the urbanized area of São Pedro and the docklands

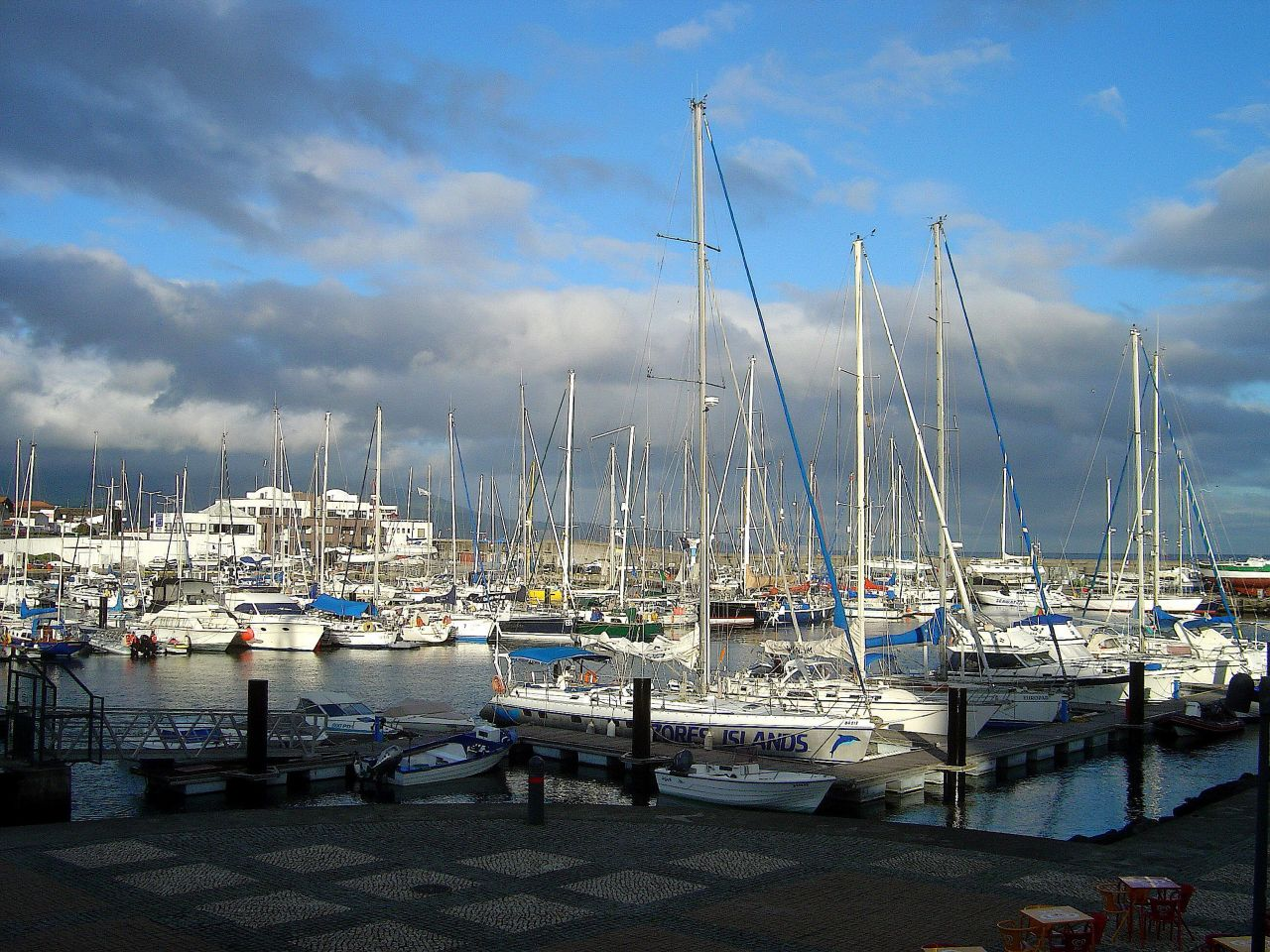
The Pêro de Tieve Marina on the coast of São Pedro

The first inhabitants on the island of São Miguel were primarily farmers, and were granted tracts of land to cultivate. These small populations would eventually form the nucleus of the three main agglomerations in southern São Miguel: Matriz (São Sebastião), Santa Clara e São Jose, and São Pedro. In addition to agriculture, farmers were fishermen, complementing their seasonal activities and sheltered by the natural harbours in the regions.

By 1499, the population included the writer Pêro de Teive, who signed the document that elevated Ponta Delgada to status of town. In the 19th century, at the beginning of the Liberal Wars, the residence of Morgado do Canto became the residence for Dom Pedro, Duke of Bragança, when he disembarked and installed his Liberal faction in the Azores. From here, the Duke would travel to the other islands and gather forces before parting for the continent with 7,500 troops to combat the Miguelist faction. The departure occurred from Relvão, a zone that was later transformed into a public walkway and retained the title of Alameda da Liberdade or Alameda do Duque de Bragança.

== Architecture ==
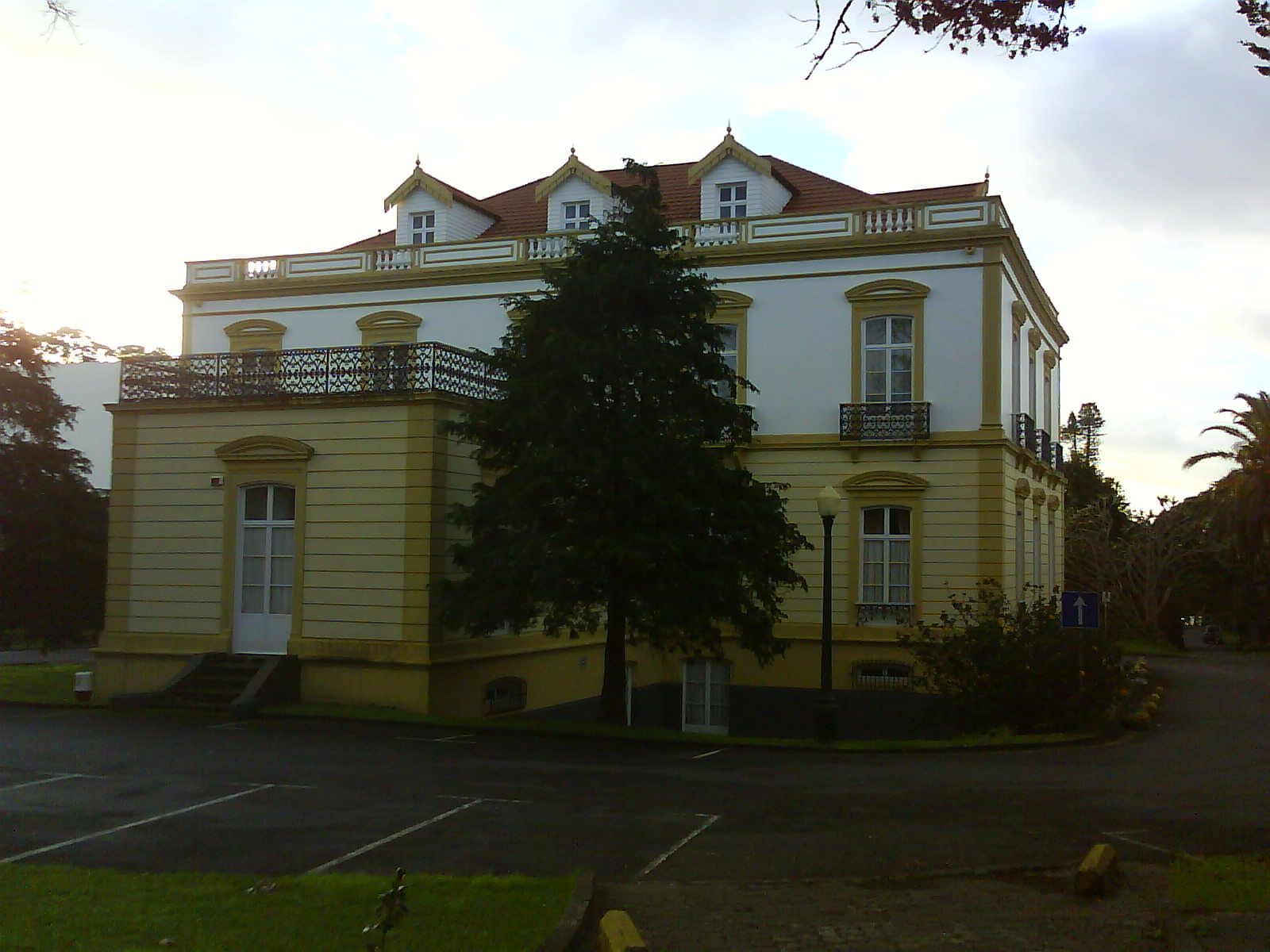
The rectory building of the University of the Azores, the complex is one of the main institutions that exist in the parish

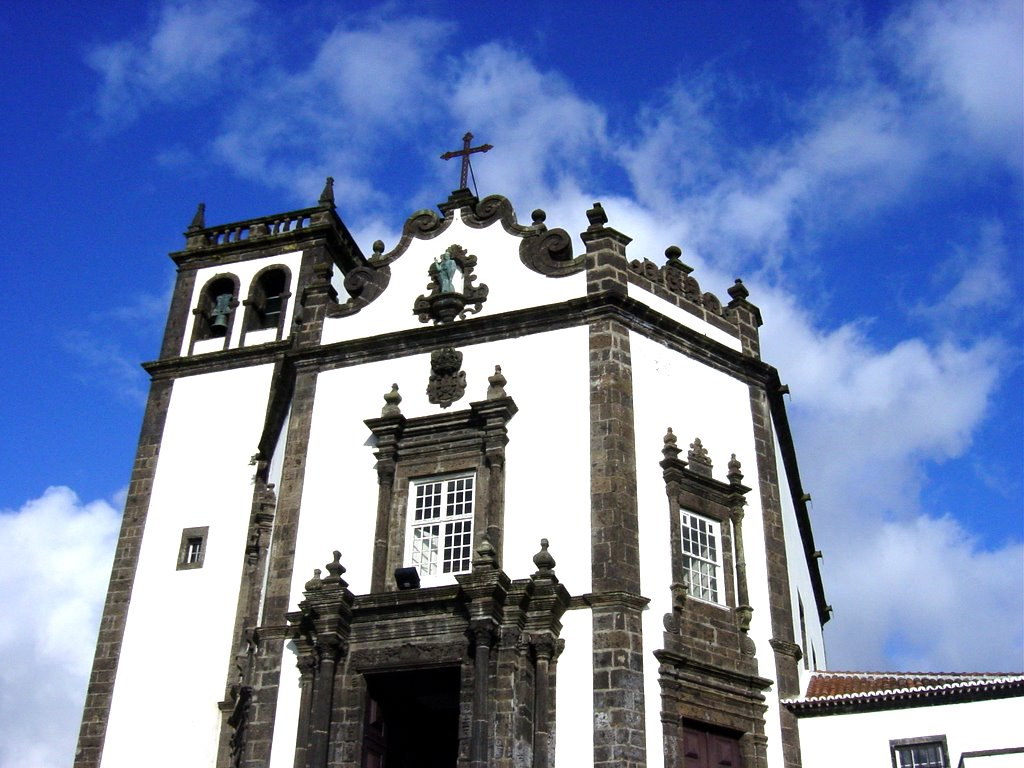
The Church of São Pedro, the parochial church, of the civil parish

=== Civic ===
- Estate of the Baron of Laranjeiras (Portuguese: Solar Barão das Laranjeiras)
- Preparatory (School) Roberto Ivens (Portuguese: Escola Roberto Ivens/Escola Preparatória)
- Observatory Afonso Chaves (Portuguese: Observatório Afonso Chaves)

=== Religious ===
- Convent of Nossa Senhora da Graça (Portuguese: Convento de Nossa Senhora da Graça/Academia das Artes dos Açores)
- Church of São Pedro (Portuguese: Igreja Paroquial de São Pedro)
- Hermitage of Mãe de Deus (Portuguese: Ermida de Mãe de Deus/Igreja da Mães de Deus)
- Hermitage of São Gonçalo (Portuguese: Ermida de São Gonçalo/Igreja de São Gonçalo)

== Notable citizens ==
- Roberto Ivens (12 June 1850; São Pedro - 28 January 1898; Dafundo, Lisbon)
