= La Tejita =

Beach in Tenerife, Spain

La Tejita is a beach in the municipality of Granadilla de Abona, in Tenerife, Spain. It is listed as a protected area by the Spanish ministry for the environment. It is popular with windsurfers and hosted the 2015 world championship.

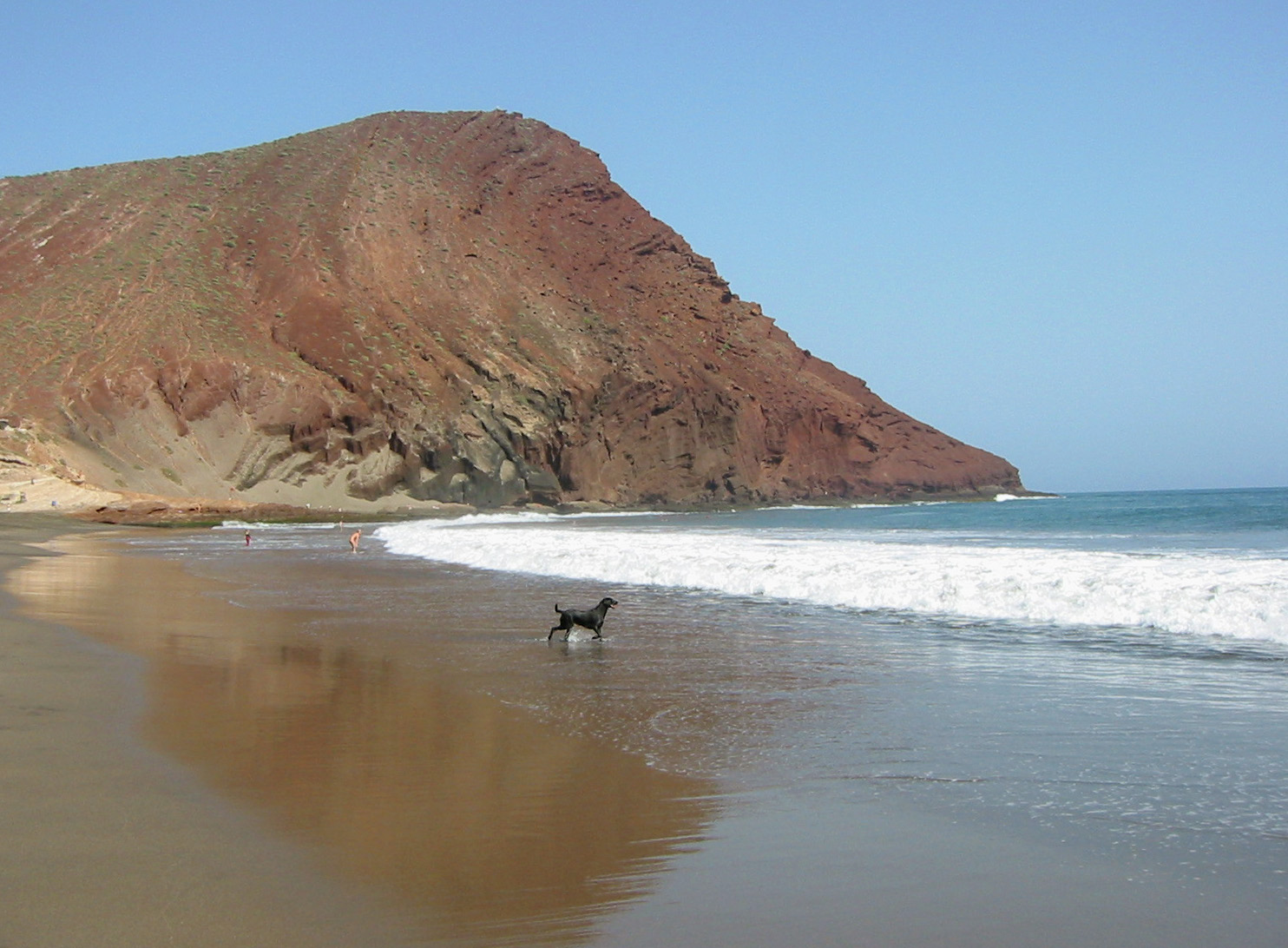
Montaña Roja seen from La Tejita
