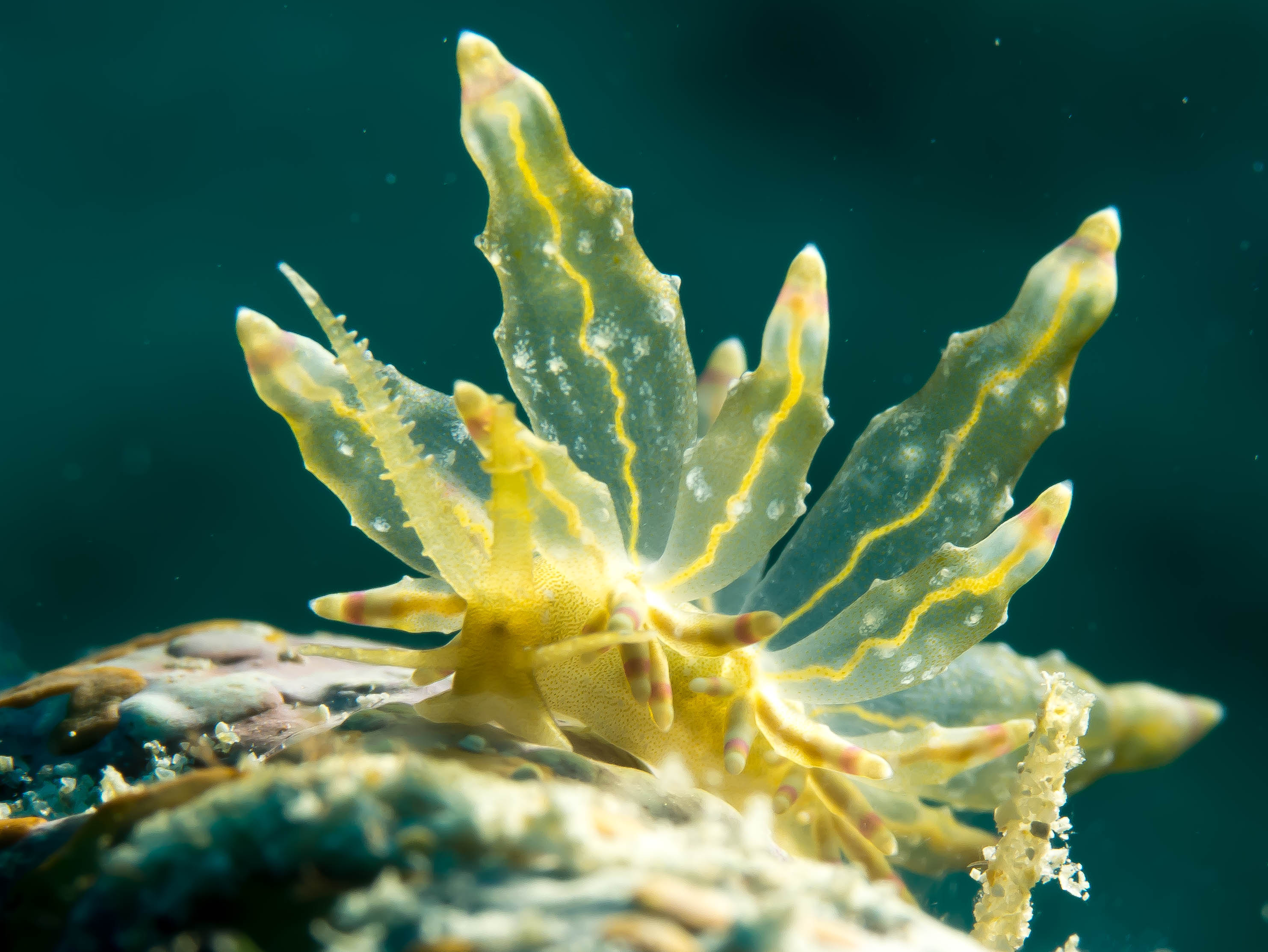
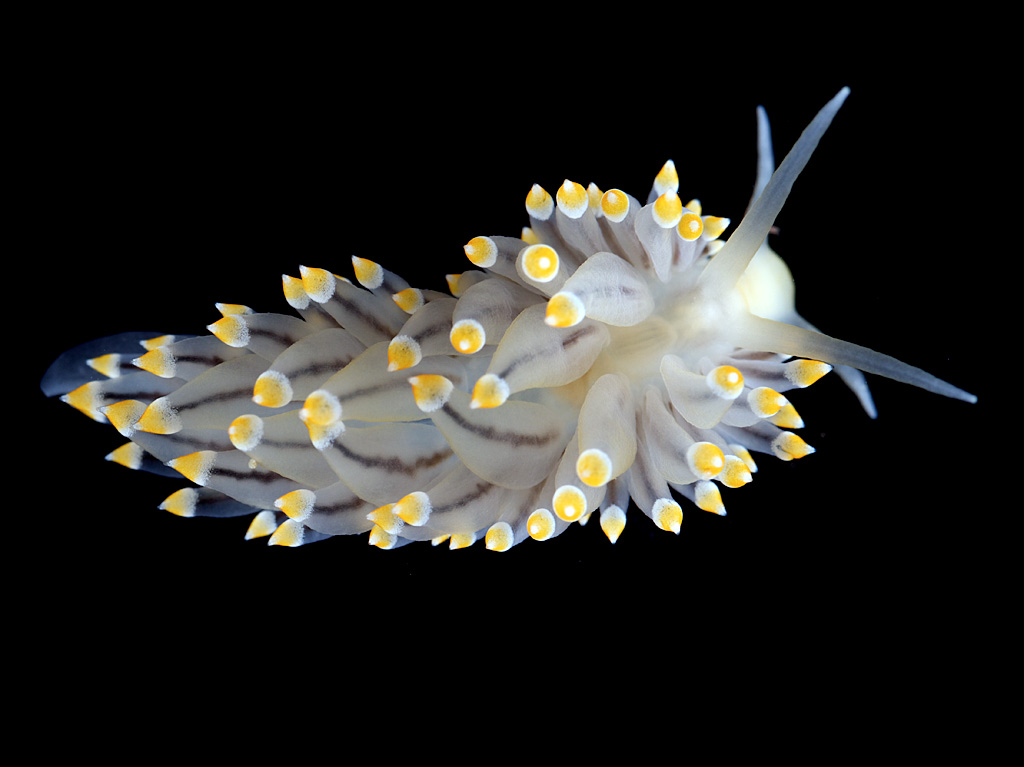
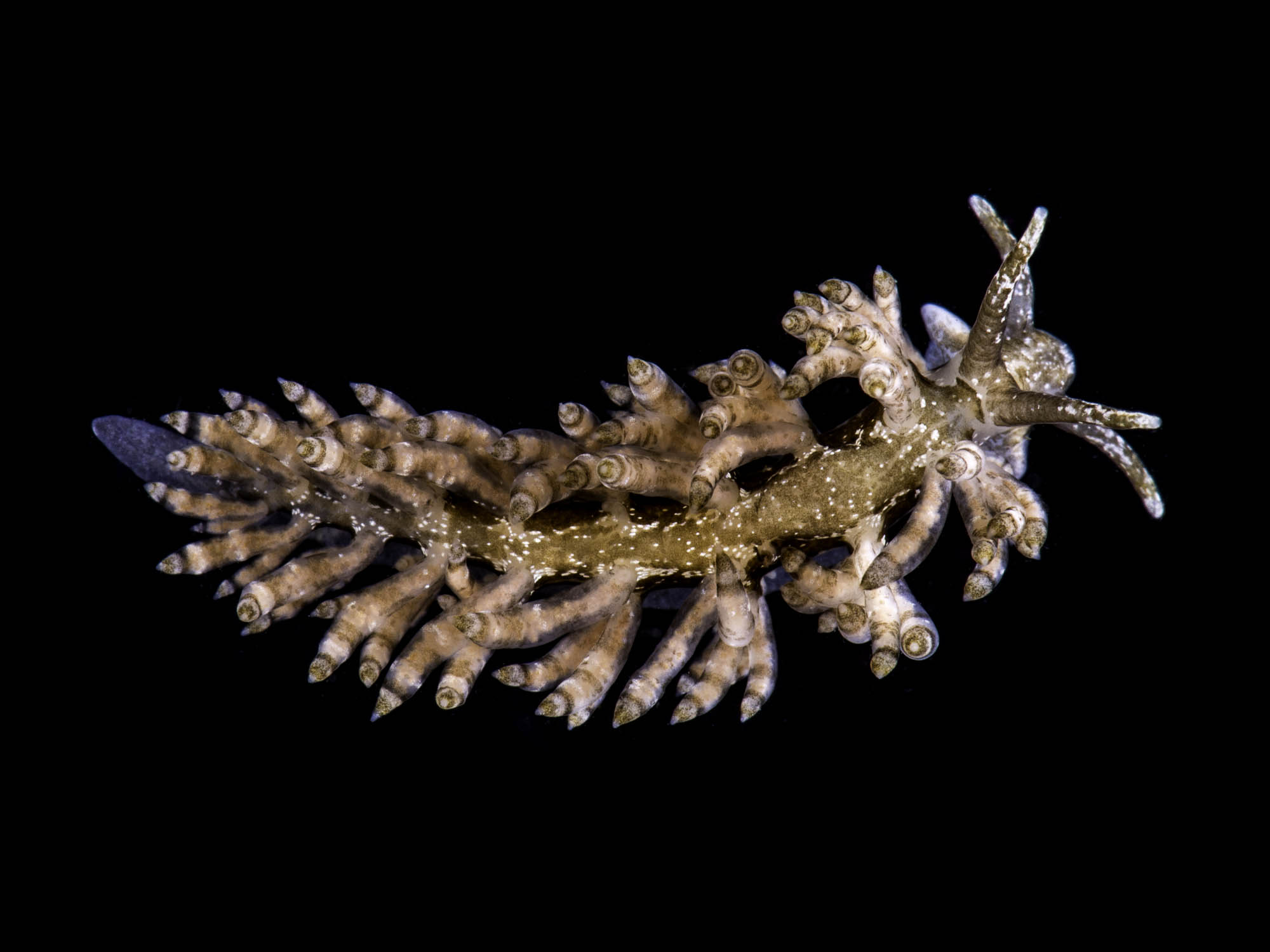
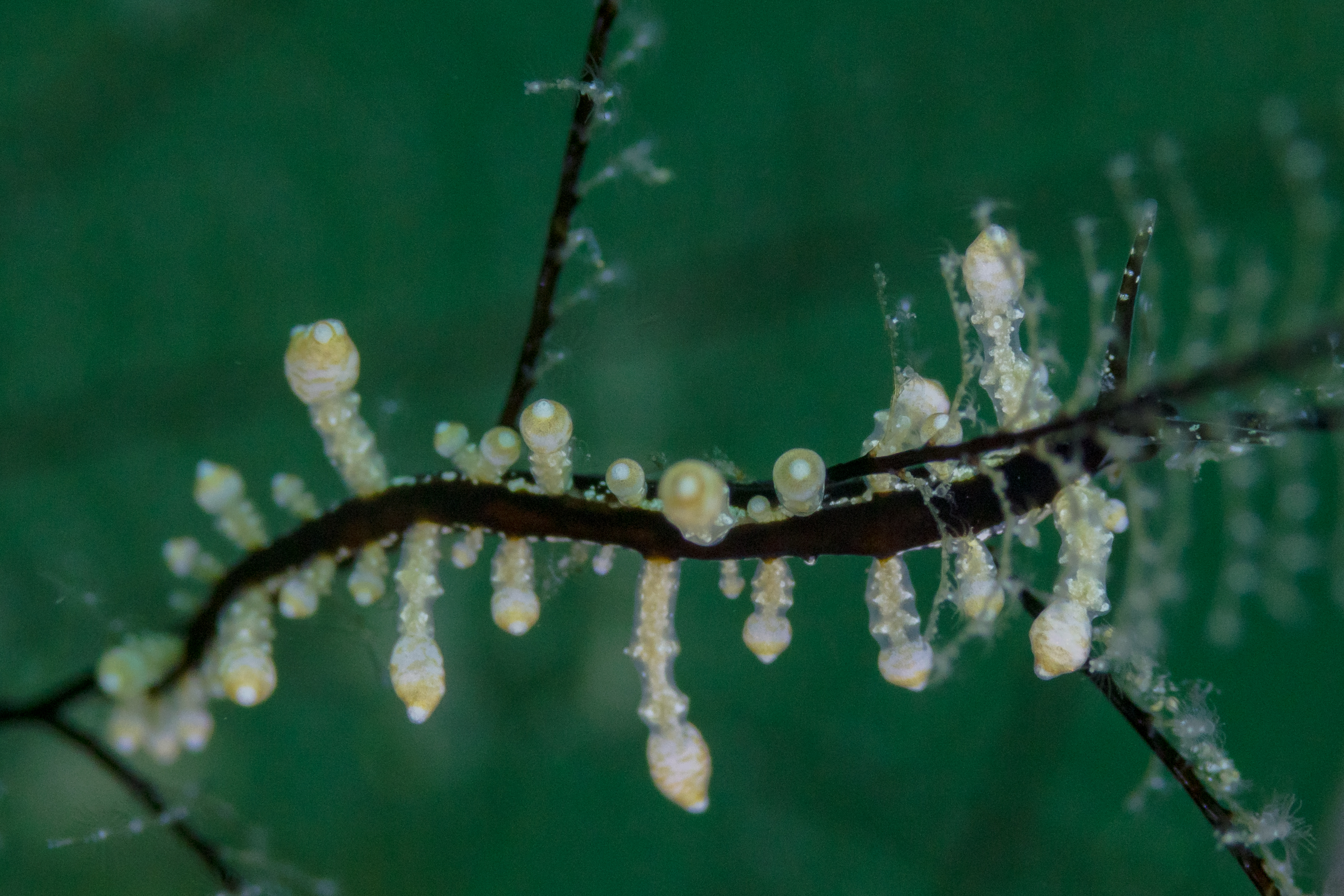
- From left to right in each row, from top to bottom: Annulorhina mandapamensis, Eubranchus tricolor, Capellinia vittata, Longibranchus putnami

Scientific classification
- Kingdom: Animalia
- Phylum: Mollusca
- Class: Gastropoda
- Order: Nudibranchia
- Suborder: Aeolidacea
- Superfamily: Fionoidea
- Family: Eubranchidae; Odhner, 1934

Genera
- See genera

= Eubranchidae =

Family of gastropods

Eubranchidae is a family of nudibranchs, shell-less marine gastropod molluscs or sea slugs, within the superfamily Fionoidea. They are the only known fionoid family with a triserial radula, this is, its central teeth are flanked by one longitudinal row of lateral teeth on each side.

== Taxonomic history ==
In 2016, a molecular phylogenetics study by Cella and colleagues placed various fionoid taxa in the family Fionidae. In 2017, Korshunova and colleagues resintated several of these lumped families due to their considerable morphological and molecular pattern differences from each other. Differences, such as the tricerial radula unique to Eubranchidae among fionoids, the authors argue should grant the usage of more narrowly-defined families.

== Genera ==
Genera within the family Eubranchidae include:

- Aenigmastyletus Martynov, 1998
- Amphorina Quatrefages, 1844
- Annulorhina K. P. Rao, 1968
- Capellinia Trinchese, 1873
- Corruptobranchus Martynov & Korshunova, 2025
- Dunga|Dunga (gastropod) | Dunga Eliot, 1902
- Eubranchopsis Baba, 1949
- Eubranchulus Martynov & Korshunova, 2025
- Eubranchus Forbes, 1838
- Galvinella Eliot, 1907
- Karavellia Martynov & Korshunova, 2025
- Leostyletus Martynov, 1998
- Longibranchus Martynov & Korshunova, 2025
- Nihonbranchus Martynov & Korshunova, 2025
- Nudibranchus Martynov, 1998
- Produnga Martynov, 1998
