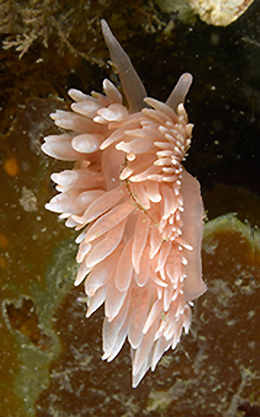
- Cuthonella abyssicola kryos

Scientific classification
- Kingdom: Animalia
- Phylum: Mollusca
- Class: Gastropoda
- Order: Nudibranchia
- Suborder: Aeolidacea
- Family: Cuthonellidae
- Genus: Cuthonella; Bergh, 1884

= Cuthonella =

Genus of gastropods

Cuthonella is a genus of sea slugs, specifically aeolid nudibranchs, marine gastropod molluscs in the family Cuthonellidae.

== Species ==
Species within the genus Cuthonella include:

- Cuthonella abyssicola Bergh, 1884
- Cuthonella punicea Millen, 1986
- Cuthonella sandrae Korshunova, N. P. Sanamyan, K. E. Sanamyan, Bakken, Lundin, Fletcher & Martynov, 2020

Known species not provided with an alternate placement in Korshunova et al. (2025):

- Cuthonella modesta Eliot, 1907

Species originally described in Cuthonella but currently placed in synonymy include:

- Cuthonella ainu Korshunova, N. P. Sanamyan, K. E. Sanamyan, Bakken, Lundin, Fletcher & Martynov, 2020 : synonym of Nella ainu
- Cuthonella anastasia Ekimova, Grishina & Nikitenko, 2024 : synonym of Nella anastasia
- Cuthonella antarctica Eliot, 1907: synonym of Galvinella antarctica Eliot, 1907
- Cuthonella benedykti Korshunova, N. P. Sanamyan, K. E. Sanamyan, Bakken, Lundin, Fletcher & Martynov, 2020: synonym of Nella benedykti
- Cuthonella elioti Odhner, 1944: synonym of Galvinella antarctica Eliot, 1907
- Cuthonella berghi Friele, 1903: synonym of Cuthonella abyssicola Bergh, 1884
- Cuthonella cocoachroma G. C. Williams & Gosliner, 1979: synonym of Margina cocoachroma
- Cuthonella concinna Alder & Hancock, 1843 : synonym of Fiocuthona concinna
- Cuthonella denbei Korshunova, N. P. Sanamyan, K. E. Sanamyan, Bakken, Lundin, Fletcher & Martynov, 2020 : synonym of Nella denbei
- Cuthonella elenae Martynov, 2000: synonym of Penistella elenae
- Cuthonella ferruginea Friele, 1903: synonym of Cuthonella abyssicola Bergh, 1884
- Cuthonella georgstelleri Korshunova, N. P. Sanamyan, K. E. Sanamyan, Bakken, Lundin, Fletcher & Martynov, 2020: synonym of Nella goergstelleri
- Cuthonella hiemalis Roginskaya: synonym of Nella hiemalis
- Cuthonella norvegica Odhner, 1929: synonym of Cuthona norvegica
- Cuthonella orientosiberica Korshunova, N. P. Sanamyan, K. E. Sanamyan, Bakken, Lundin, Fletcher & Martynov, 2020 : synonym of Nella orientosiberica
- Cuthonella osyoro Baba, 1940: synonym of Nella osyoro
- Cuthonella paradoxa Eliot, 1907: synonym of Guyvalvoria paradoxa
- Cuthonella rgo Korshunova & Martynov, 2022 : synonym of Nella rgo
- Cuthonella soboli Martynov, 1992: synonym of Nella soboli
- Cuthonella vasentsovichi Korshunova, N. P. Sanamyan, K. E. Sanamyan, Bakken, Lundin, Fletcher & Martynov, 2020: synonym of Victima vasentsovichi
