= Cuthonella ferruginea =

Scientific classification
- Kingdom: Animalia
- Phylum: Mollusca
- Class: Gastropoda
- Order: Nudibranchia
- Suborder: Aeolidacea
- Family: Cuthonellidae
- Genus: Cuthonella
- Species: C. ferruginea

Binomial name
- Cuthonella ferruginea Friele, 1902

Species of gastropod

This taxon is inactive. It has been made synonymous with Cuthonella abyssicola.

Cuthonella ferruginea is a species of sea slug, an aeolid nudibranch, a marine gastropod mollusc in the family Cuthonellidae.

== Distribution ==
This species was described from a single specimen collected at 600 m depth between the Faeroe Islands and Iceland at 64°53′N 10°00′W.
