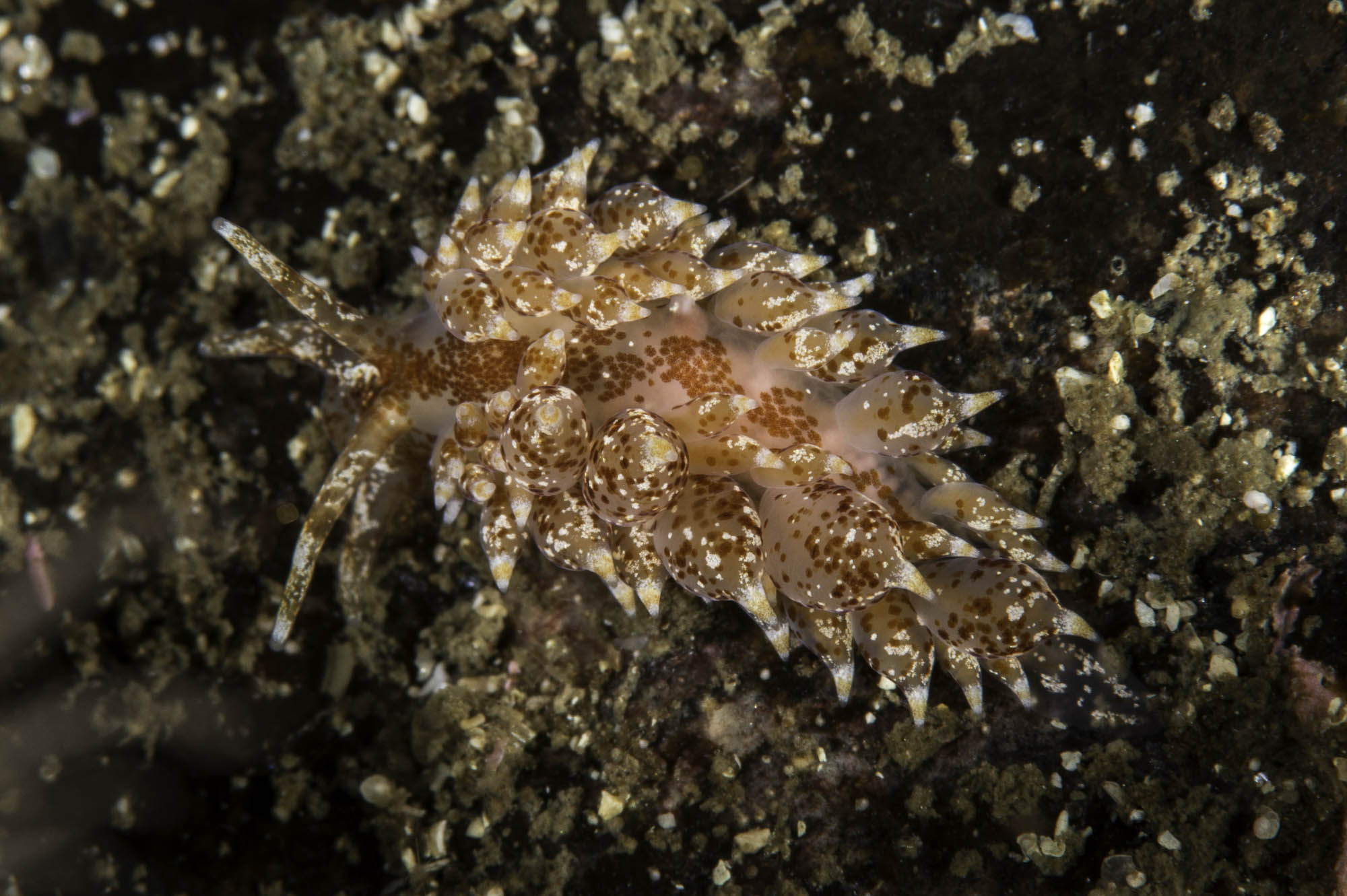
- Amphorina pallida

Scientific classification
- Kingdom: Animalia
- Phylum: Mollusca
- Class: Gastropoda
- Order: Nudibranchia
- Suborder: Aeolidacea
- Family: Eubranchidae
- Genus: Amphorina; Quatrefages, 1844

Type species
- Amphorina galvina Quatrefages, 1844

= Amphorina =

Genus of aeolid nudibranch in the family Eubranchidae

Amphorina is a genus of aeolid nudibranch in the family Eubranchidae.

== Species ==
Species within the genus Amphorina include:

- Amphorina amazighi Tamsouri, Carmona, Moukrim & Cervera, 2015
- Amphorina andra Korshunova, Malmberg, Prkić, Petani, Fletcher, Lundin, Martynov, 2020
- Amphorina farrani (Alder and Hancock, 1844)
- Amphorina linensis (Garcia-Gomez, Cervera & Garcia, 1990)
- Amphorina pallida (Alder and Hancock, 1842)
- Amphorina viriola Korshunova, Malmberg, Prkić, Petani, Fletcher, Lundin, Martynov, 2020

Species brought into synonymy

- Amphorina alberti Quatrefages, 1844: synonym of Amphorina farrani Alder and Hancock, 1844
- Amphorina antarctica Eliot, 1907: synonym of Galvinella antarctica
- Amphorina columbiana O'Donoghue, 1922: synonym of Tenellia columbiana: synonym of Catriona columbiana
- Amphorina horii Baba, 1960: synonym of Nihonbranchus horii
- Amphorina odhneri Derjugin & Gurjanova, 1926: synonym of Corruptobranchus odhneri
- Amphorina pallida Eliot, 1906 (Not to be confused with the above valid taxa Amphorina pallida Alder and Hancock, 1842): synonym of Trinchesia pallida Eliot, 1906
