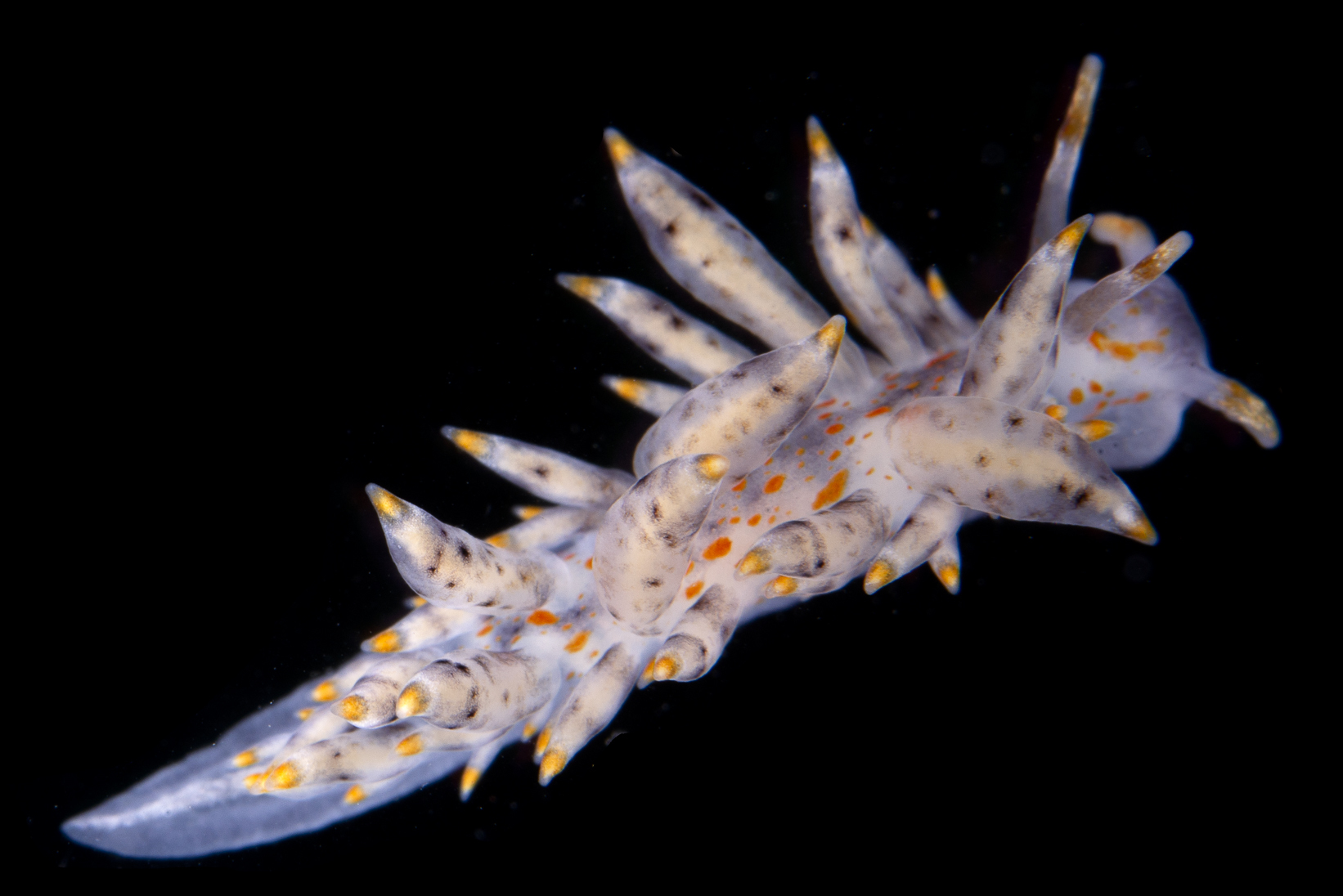

Scientific classification
- Kingdom: Animalia
- Phylum: Mollusca
- Class: Gastropoda
- Order: Nudibranchia
- Suborder: Aeolidacea
- Family: Eubranchidae
- Genus: Amphorina
- Species: A. andra

Binomial name
- Amphorina andra Korshunova, Malmberg, Prkić, Petani, Fletcher, Lundin & Martynov, 2020

= Amphorina andra =

Species of gastropod

Amphorina andra is a species of sea slug or nudibranch, a marine gastropod mollusc in the family Eubranchidae.

== Distribution ==
This species was described from Smögen, outermost skerries (58°22′00″N 11°11′00″E), Sweden, NE Atlantic. Additional specimens from the UK, Italy and Croatia indicate that it has a wide distribution from Sweden to the Mediterranean Sea.
