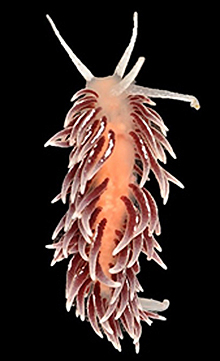

Scientific classification
- Kingdom: Animalia
- Phylum: Mollusca
- Class: Gastropoda
- Order: Nudibranchia
- Suborder: Aeolidacea
- Family: Cuthonellidae
- Genus: Cuthonella
- Species: C. punicea

Binomial name
- Cuthonella punicea (Millen, 1986)

Synonyms
- Cuthona punicea Millen, 1986; Tenellia punicea Millen, 1986

= Cuthonella punicea =

Species of gastropod

Cuthonella punicea is a species of sea slug, an aeolid nudibranch, a marine gastropod mollusc in the family Cuthonellidae.

== Distribution ==
This species was described from British Columbia, Canada, Pacific Ocean. It has been suggested that this species is synonymous with the Atlantic Ocean species Tenellia pustulata but this seems unlikely given the differences in colour, diet and anatomy. Only the 16S and H3 gene were sequenced and these are known to be identical in some other species pairs.

== Ecology ==
Cuthonella punicea feeds on a large purple athecate hydroid which is thought to be an undescribed species of Corymorpha.
