= Hovenäset =

Place in Sweden

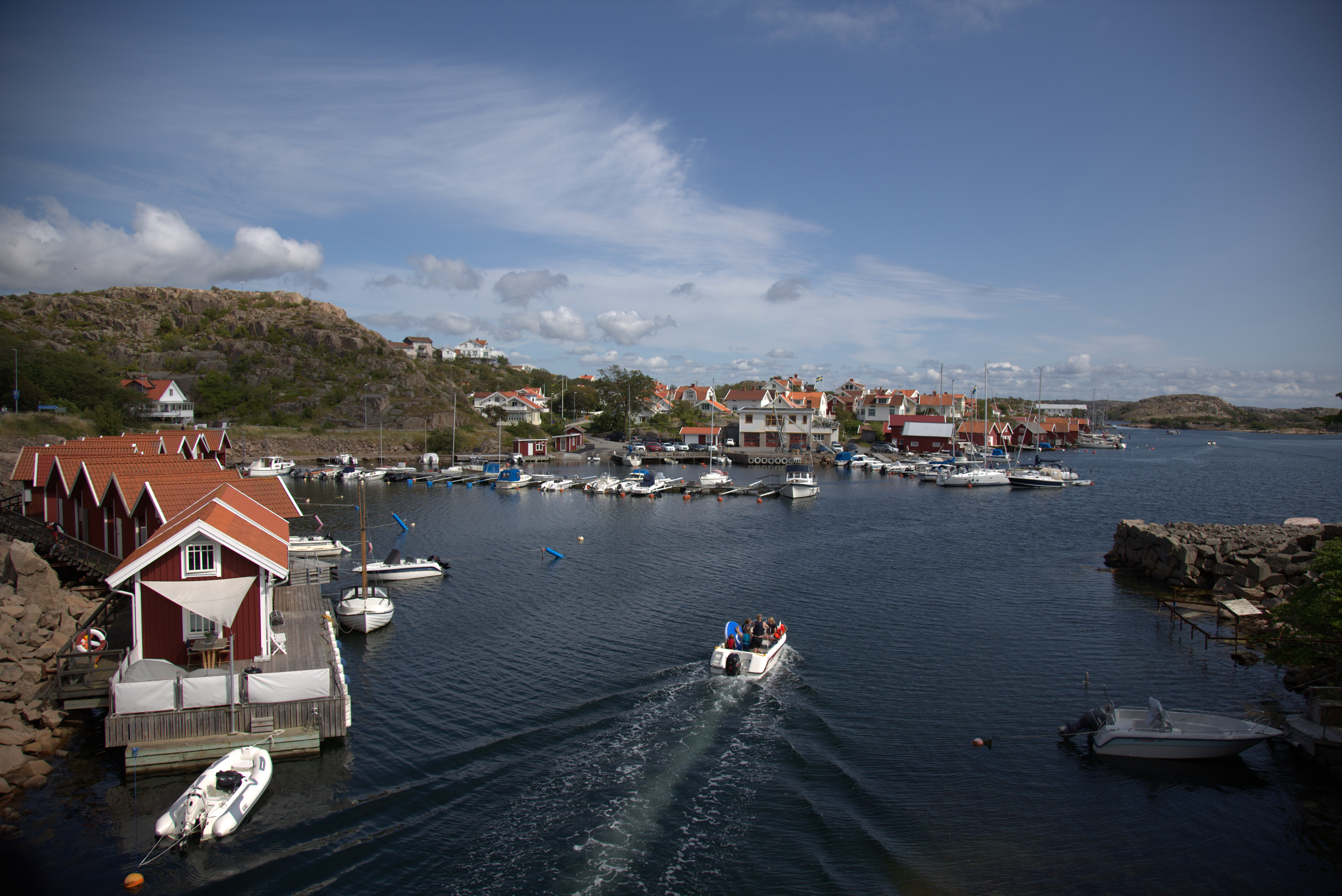

- Location within Sweden
- Coordinates: 58°022′N 11°017′E

Hovenäset is a locality in Sotenäs Municipality in Västra Götaland County and is located about 3 km north of Kungshamn.
