= Cuthonella modesta =

Scientific classification
- Kingdom: Animalia
- Phylum: Mollusca
- Class: Gastropoda
- Order: Nudibranchia
- Suborder: Aeolidacea
- Family: Cuthonellidae
- Genus: Cuthonella
- Species: C. modesta

Binomial name
- Cuthonella modesta Eliot, 1907

Synonyms
- Cuthona modesta Eliot, 1907

Species of gastropod

Cuthonella modesta is a species of sea slug, an aeolid nudibranch, a marine gastropod mollusc in the family Cuthonellidae.

== Distribution ==
This species was described from Hut Point, Ross Sea, Antarctica. It has been reported from McMurdo Sound.
