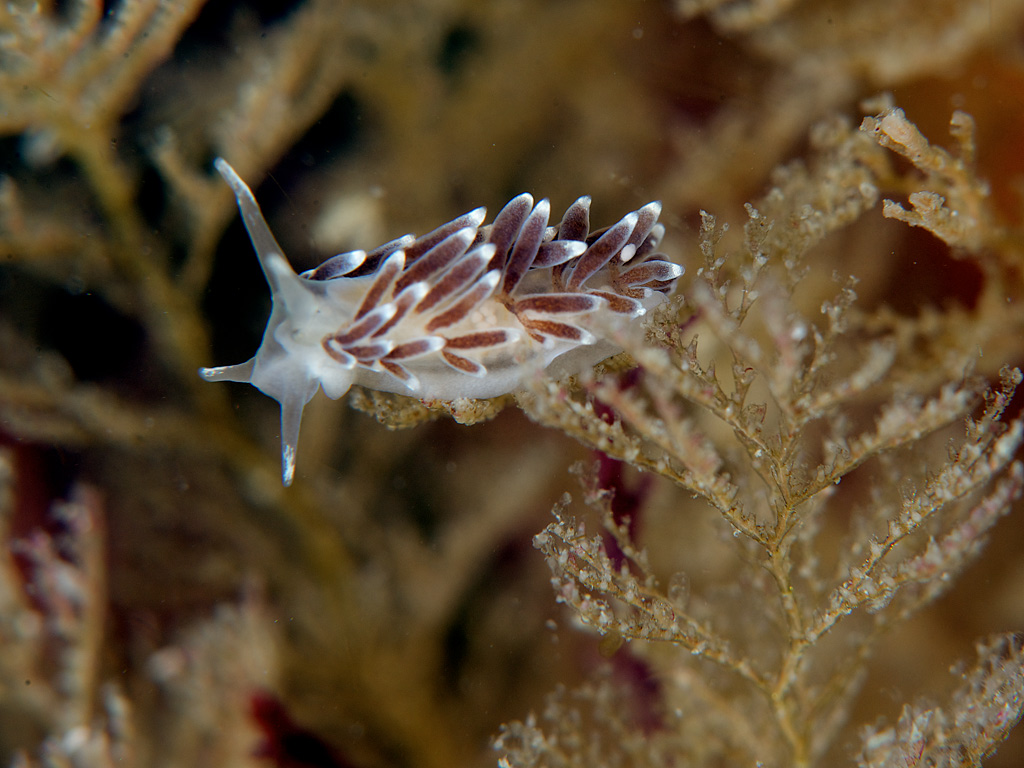
- The nudibranch Fiocuthona concinna, Strangford Lough, County Down, Northern Ireland.

Scientific classification
- Kingdom: Animalia
- Phylum: Mollusca
- Class: Gastropoda
- Order: Nudibranchia
- Suborder: Aeolidacea
- Family: Cuthonellidae
- Genus: Fiocuthona
- Species: F. concinna

Binomial name
- Fiocuthona concinna (Alder & Hancock, 1843)

Synonyms
- Eolis concinna Alder & Hancock, 1843; Cuthona concinna Alder & Hancock, 1843; Cuthona distans Odhner, 1922; Cuthona marisalbi Roginskaya, 1963; Cuthonella concinna Alder & Hancock, 1843

= Fiocuthona concinna =

Species of gastropod

Fiocuthona concinna is a species of sea slug, an aeolid nudibranch, a marine gastropod mollusk in the family Cuthonellidae.

== Distribution ==
This species was described from Whitley Bay, Northumberland, England. It has been reported from the Northeast Atlantic from Finmarken, Norway south to Normandy, France and in the NW Atlantic from New England as well as from the NE Pacific at Vancouver Island, Canada. In Britain and Ireland it is a northern species, occurring at Skomer Island, Pembrokeshire and in the Irish Sea and Scotland. It is also reported from Iceland.

== Description ==
The typical adult size of this species is 10–12 mm.

== Habitat ==
Fiocuthona concinna feeds on the hydroid Sertularia argentea, family Sertulariidae.
