= Väjern =

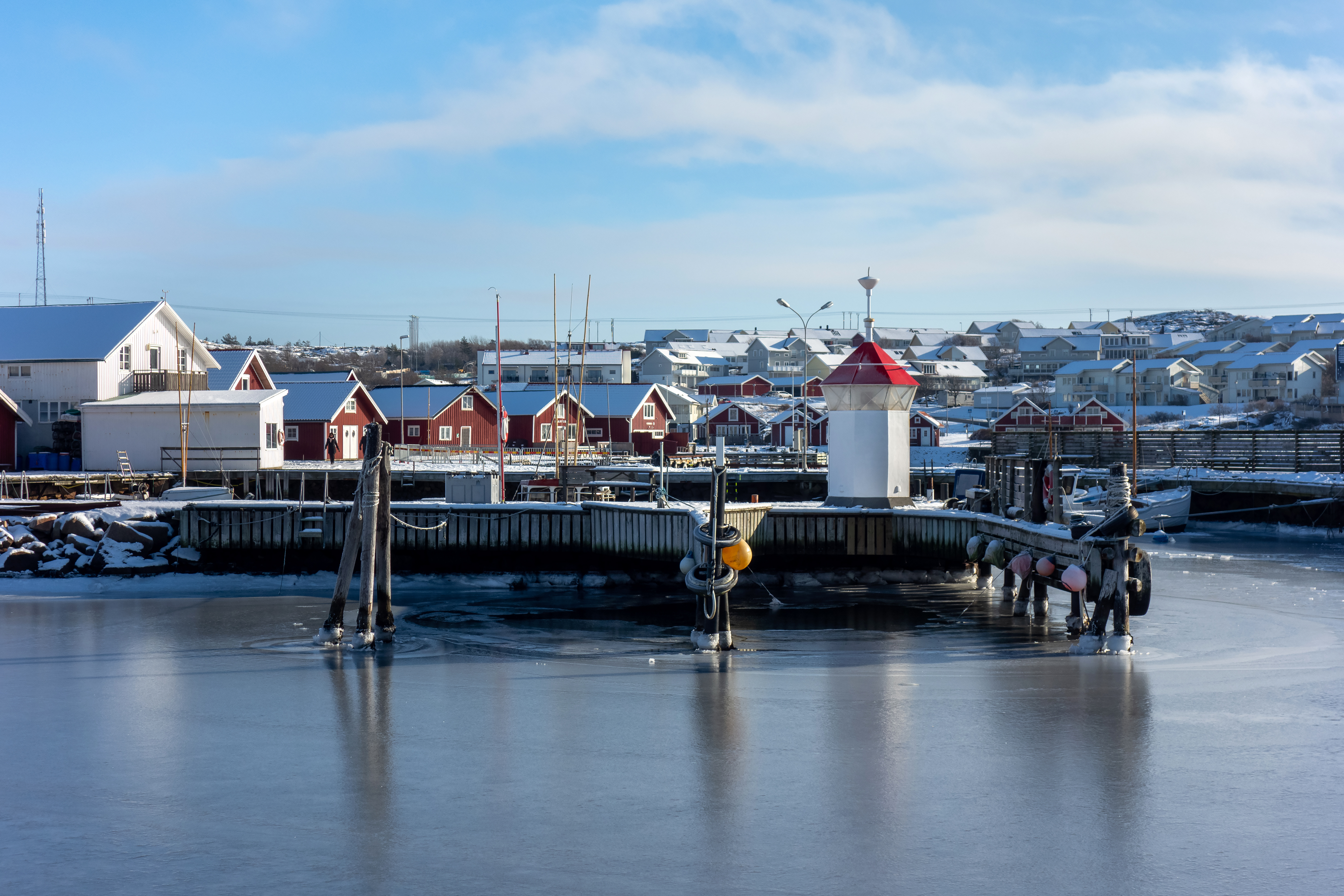
- Lighthouse in Väjern harbor

- Location within Västra Götaland Location within Sweden
- Coordinates: 58°23′N 11°16′E
- Country: Sweden
- Province: Bohuslän
- County: Västra Götaland County
- Municipality: Sotenäs Municipality

Area
  - Total: 0.41 km^{2} (0.16 sq mi)

Population (31 December 2010)
  - Total: 688
  - Density: 1,688/km^{2} (4,370/sq mi)
- Time zone: UTC+1 (CET)
  - Summer (DST): UTC+2 (CEST)
- Website: http://www.swengelsk.se/coast/default.html http://www.väjern.com

Väjern is a locality situated in Sotenäs Municipality, Västra Götaland County, Sweden with 688 inhabitants in 2010.
