= Bovallstrand =

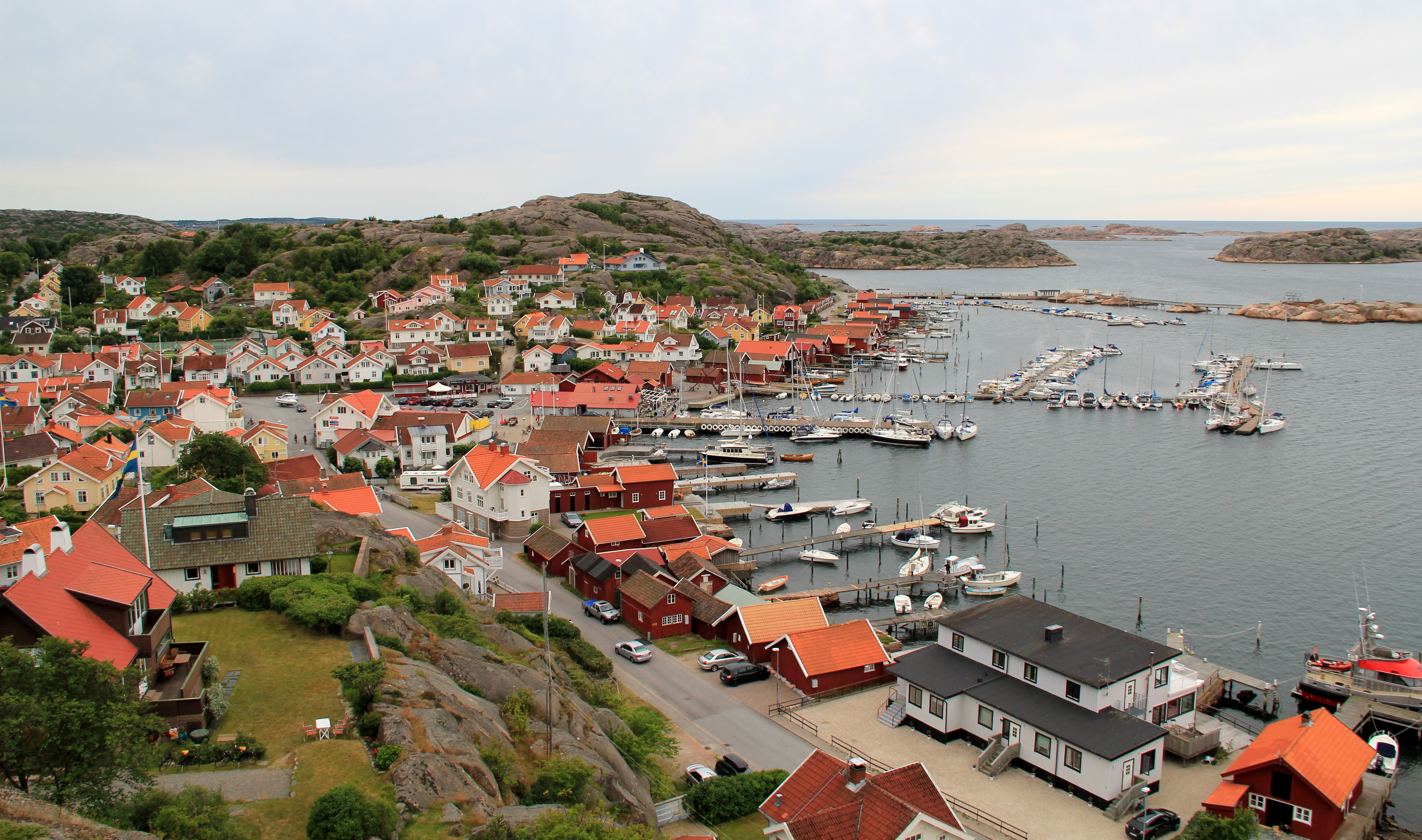
- Bovallstrand

- Location within Västra Götaland Location within Sweden
- Coordinates: 58°29′N 11°19′E
- Country: Sweden
- Province: Bohuslän
- County: Västra Götaland County
- Municipality: Sotenäs Municipality

Area
  - Total: 0.81 km^{2} (0.31 sq mi)

Population (31 December 2010)
  - Total: 474
  - Density: 585/km^{2} (1,520/sq mi)
- Time zone: UTC+1 (CET)
  - Summer (DST): UTC+2 (CEST)

Bovallstrand is a locality situated in Sotenäs Municipality, Västra Götaland County, Sweden with 474 inhabitants on December 31, 2010.
