= Amphorina amazighi =

Scientific classification
- Kingdom: Animalia
- Phylum: Mollusca
- Class: Gastropoda
- Order: Nudibranchia
- Suborder: Aeolidacea
- Family: Eubranchidae
- Genus: Amphorina
- Species: A. amazighi

Binomial name
- Amphorina amazighi (Tamsouri, Carmona, Moukrim & Cervera), 2015

Synonyms
- Eubranchus amazighi Tamsouri, Carmona, Moukrim & Cervera, 2015

Species of gastropod

Amphorina amazighi is a species of sea slug or nudibranch, a marine gastropod mollusc in the family Eubranchidae.

== Distribution ==
This species was described from Agadir Harbour 30°25.66′N 009°38.29′W, Agadir, Morocco.
