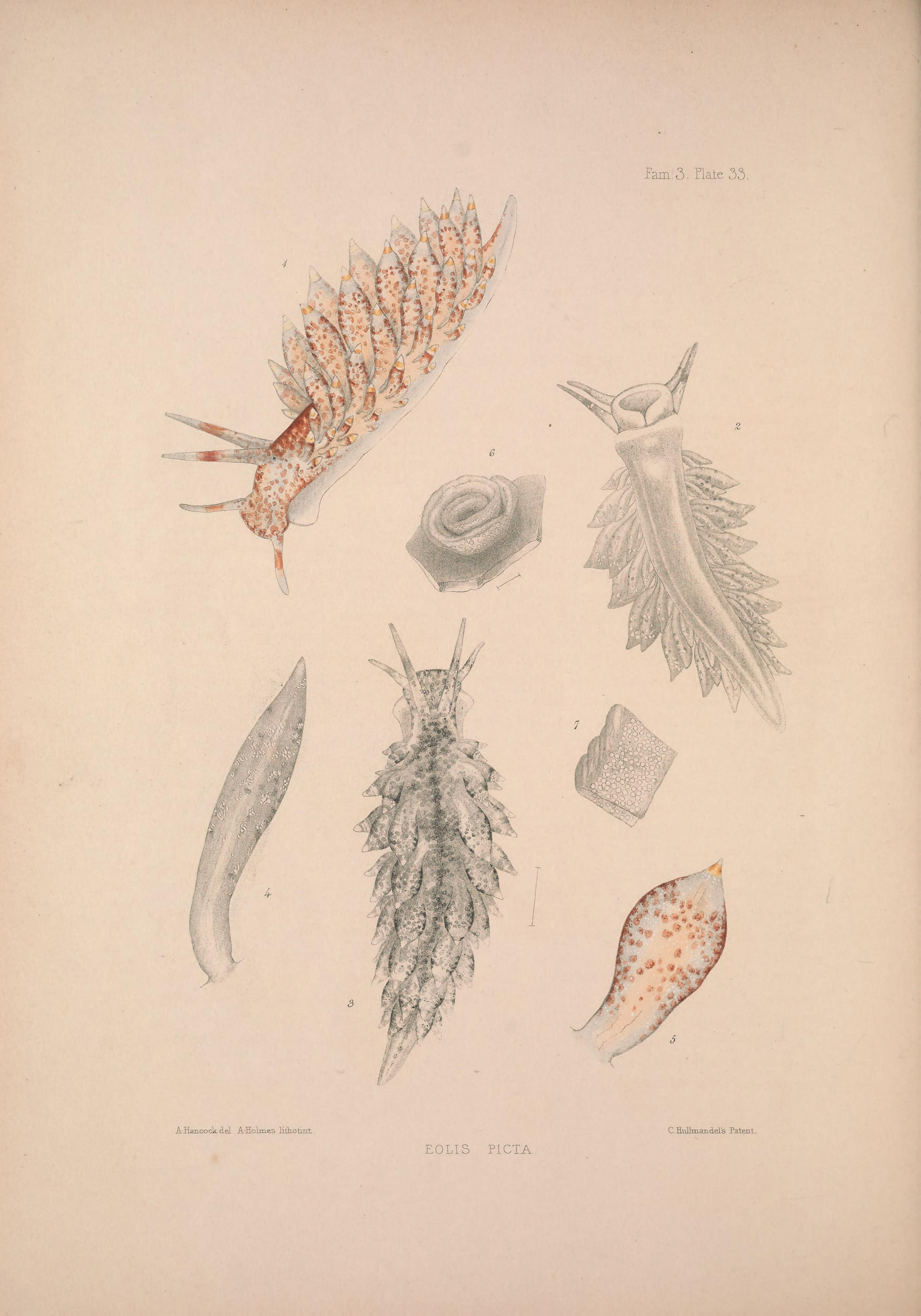
- Plate from Alder & Hancock (1845-1855)

Scientific classification
- Kingdom: Animalia
- Phylum: Mollusca
- Class: Gastropoda
- Order: Nudibranchia
- Suborder: Aeolidacea
- Family: Eubranchidae
- Genus: Amphorina
- Species: A. pallida

Binomial name
- Amphorina pallida (Alder & Hancock, 1842)

Synonyms
- Eolis pallida Alder & Hancock, 1842; Eolis picta Alder & Hancock, 1847; Eubranchus pallidus (Alder & Hancock, 1842)

= Amphorina pallida =

Species of gastropod

Amphorina pallida is a species of sea slug or nudibranch, a marine gastropod mollusc in the family Eubranchidae. Several species of Eubranchus were transferred to Amphorina in 2020.

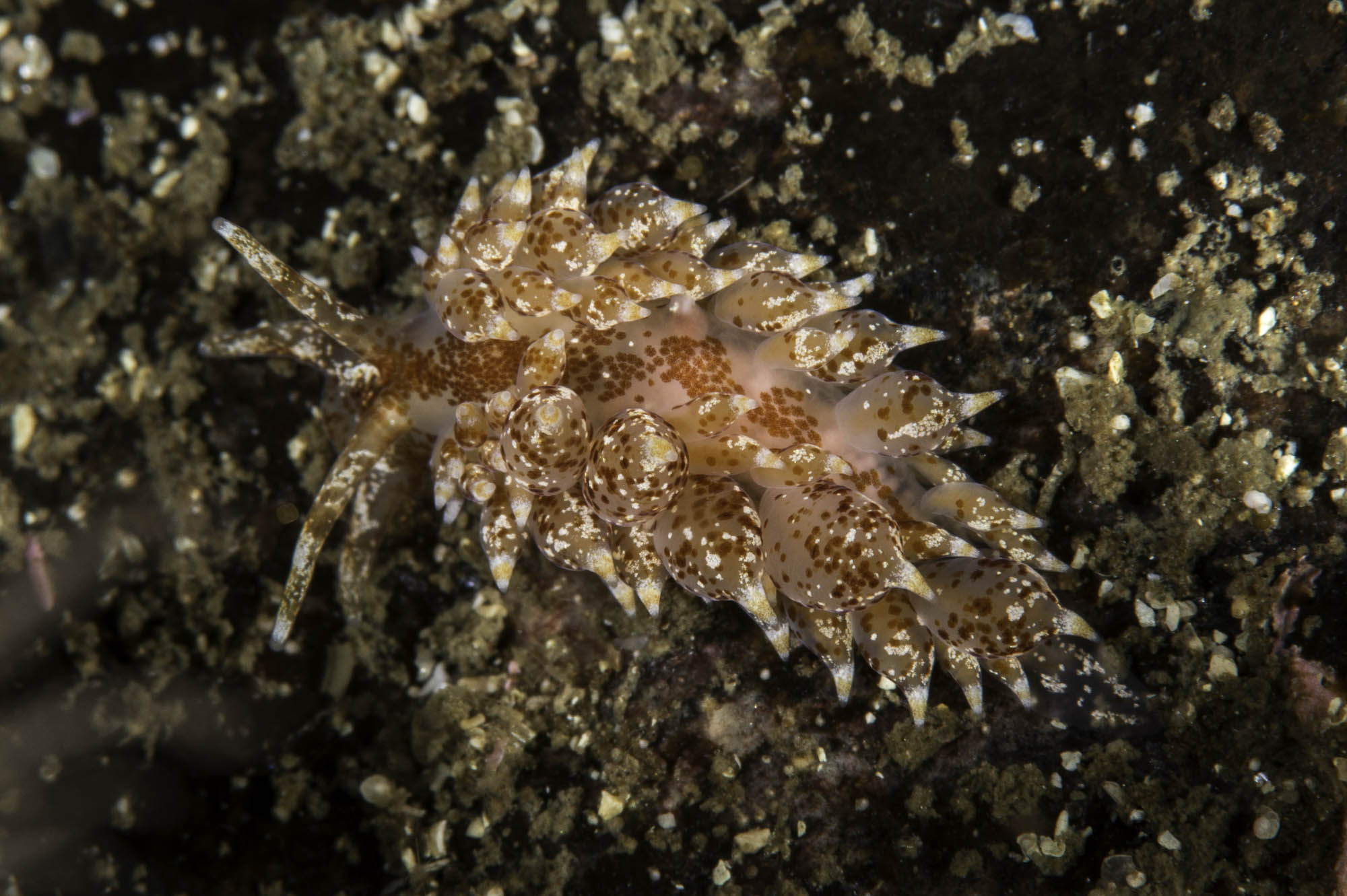
The nudibranch Amphorina pallida, Gulen Dive Resort, Norway.

== Distribution ==
This species was described from Cullercoats, England. It has been reported from Eastport, Maine; Iceland, the Barents Sea and the Atlantic coast of Europe from Norway south to the Mediterranean Sea.
