= Sotenäs Municipality =

Sotenäs Municipality Sotenäs kommun
- Municipality
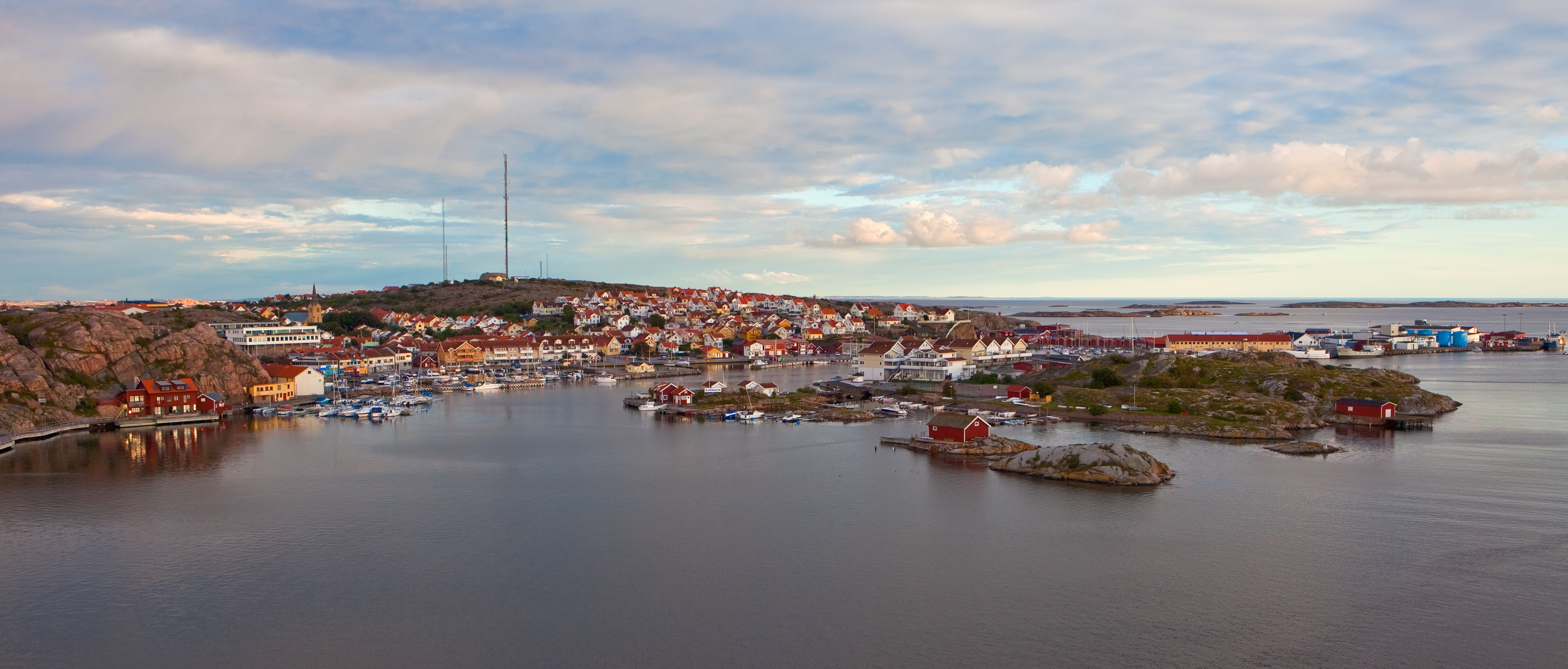

- Coat of arms

- Coordinates: 58°22′N 11°15′E
- Country: Sweden
- County: Västra Götaland County
- Seat: Kungshamn

Government

Area
  - Total: 684.37 km^{2} (264.24 sq mi)
  - Land: 138.21 km^{2} (53.36 sq mi)
  - Water: 546.16 km^{2} (210.87 sq mi)
- Area as of 1 January 2014.

Population (30 June 2025)
  - Total: 9,069
  - Density: 65.62/km^{2} (169.9/sq mi)
- Time zone: UTC+1 (CET)
  - Summer (DST): UTC+2 (CEST)
- ISO 3166 code: SE
- Province: Bohuslän
- Municipal code: 1427
- Website: www.sotenas.se

Sotenäs Municipality (Swedish: Sotenäs kommun) is a municipality in Västra Götaland County in western Sweden. Its seat is located in the town of Kungshamn, with around 3,500 inhabitants.

The present municipality was created in 1974 through the amalgamation of previous units. The name was taken from the old Sotenäs Hundred.

== Population figures ==
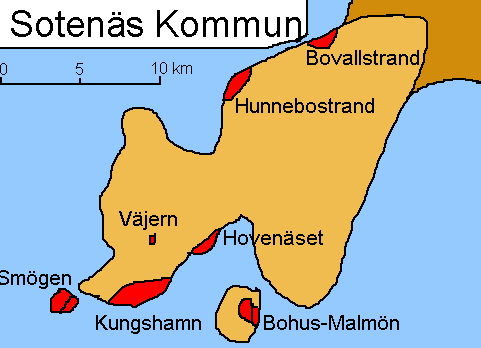
Detailed municipal map

Approximate inhabitants of the larger population centres in the municipality. Source: Statistics Sweden (2002). They are here ordered after size.

- Hovenäset 200
- Ulebergshamn 300
- Bohus-Malmön 400
- Bovallstrand 500
- Väjern 900
- Smögen 1,400
- Hunnebostrand 2,000
- Kungshamn 3,000 (seat)

== Demographics ==
This is a demographic table based on Sotenäs Municipality's electoral districts in the 2022 Swedish general election sourced from SVT's election platform, in turn taken from SCB official statistics.

In total there were 9,117 residents, including 7,627 Swedish citizens of voting age. 39.8% voted for the left coalition and 59.3% for the right coalition. Indicators are in percentage points except population totals and income.

Location	Residents	Citizen adults	Left vote	Right vote	Employed	Swedish parents	Foreign heritage	Income SEK	Degree
Location			%	%					
Askum-Väjern-Malmön	1,610	1,371	35.6	63.1	84	89	11	26,807	35
Bovallstrand-Tossene	1,117	939	43.1	56.0	82	91	9	25,506	38
Hunnebostrand	2,035	1,643	42.7	56.3	79	85	15	24,346	31
Kungshamn N	1,455	1,207	45.9	53.2	77	83	17	25,951	26
Kungshamn S	1,550	1,288	37.4	61.9	85	90	10	26,626	30
Smögen	1,350	1,179	31.2	68.3	81	92	8	27,659	36
Source: SVT

== History ==
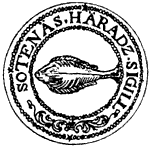
Sotenäs Hundred insignia from 1746

Västra Götaland County has been inhabited for several thousands of years. The province, Bohuslän, is among the internationally most known because of its pre-historical remains. The oldest remains in Sotenäs Municipality are from around 6000 BC. From the younger Stone Age are several burial monuments (dolmens). From the Bronze Age and Iron Age are many rock carvings, which the province also otherwise is noted for (especially the northern Tanum Municipality).

The name Sotenäs is believed to have originated from around 1000 AD, when also the first steps from the historical hundred, Sotenäs Hundred (or Härad in Swedish), can be traced.

With the Christianization of Sweden several churches were erected, starting in the 11th century. The first ones were the churches in Askum and Tossene.

Later, in the 16th century, the industry became dominated by fishing of herring. It dominated the industry for centuries; herring was used in large amounts in Bohuslän - as a basic food but also in the making of oil, wax candles, etc.

In the 19th century the island Malmön was started as a quarry. (Note that "Malm" means "rock" in Swedish). The quarry was kept alive and was of industrial significance until the 1930s.

The coat of arms was granted in 1977 and depicts a halibut. It is built on the insignia for Sotenäs Hundred and has been used for centuries.
