= Guyvalvoria =

Scientific classification
- Kingdom: Animalia
- Phylum: Mollusca
- Class: Gastropoda
- Order: Nudibranchia
- Suborder: Aeolidacea
- Family: Murmaniidae
- Genus: Guyvalvoria; Vayssière, 1906

Genus of gastropods

Guyvalvoria is a genus of sea slugs, aeolid nudibranchs, marine gastropod molluscs in the family Tergipedidae.

== Species ==
Species within the genus Guyvalvoria include:

- Guyvalvoria francaisi Vayssière, 1906
- Guyvalvoria gruzovi Martynov, 2006
- Guyvalvoria paradoxa (Eliot, 1907)
- Guyvalvoria savinkini Martynov, 2006
