= Bohus-Malmön =

Malmön
- Location within Västra Götaland Location within Sweden
- Coordinates: 58°20′50″N 11°20′10″E
- Country: Sweden
- Province: Bohuslän
- County: Västra Götaland County
- Municipality: Sotenäs Municipality
- Time zone: UTC+1 (CET)
  - Summer (DST): UTC+2 (CEST)

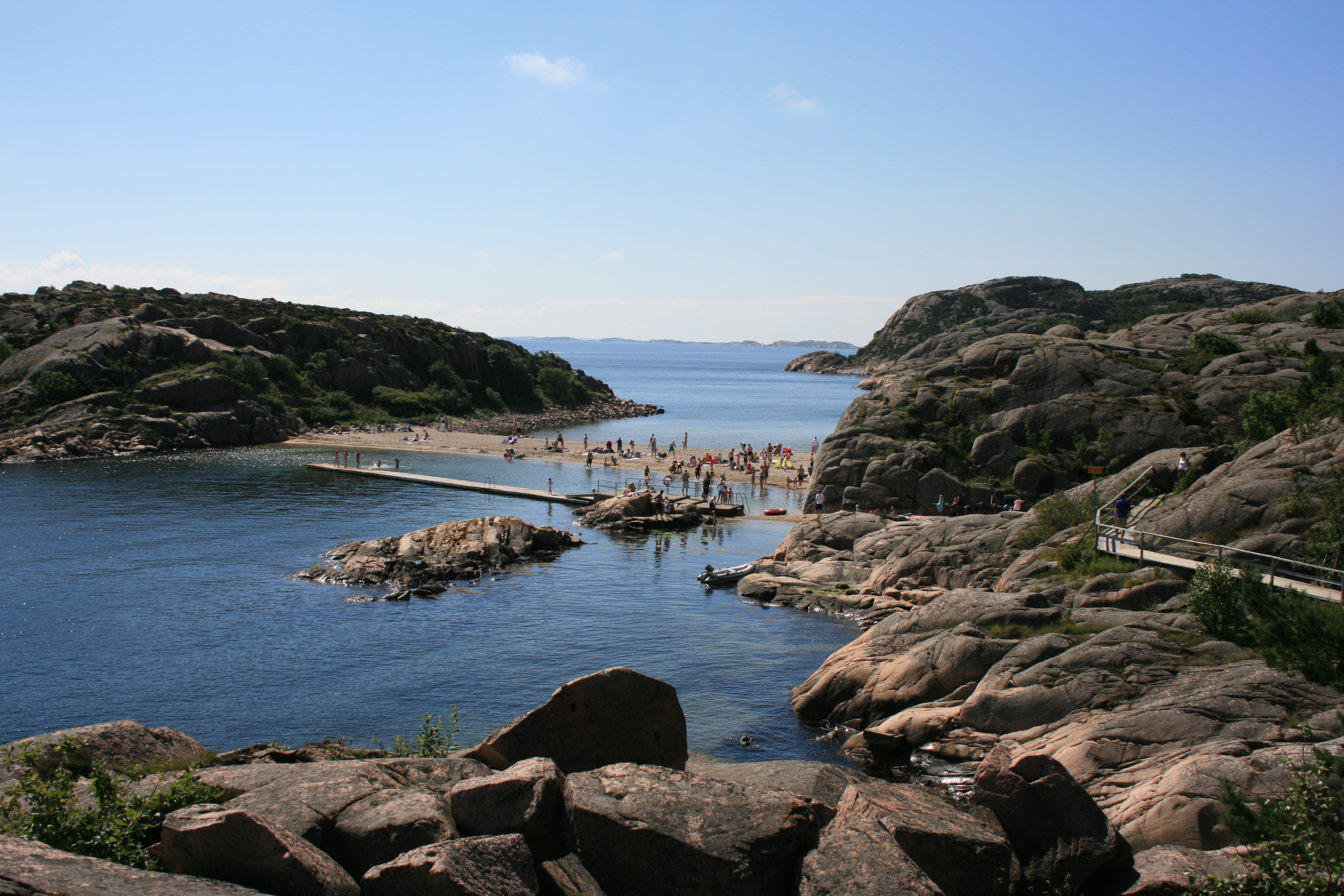
Beach at Malmön

Malmön is a locality situated in Sotenäs Municipality, Västra Götaland County, Sweden.
