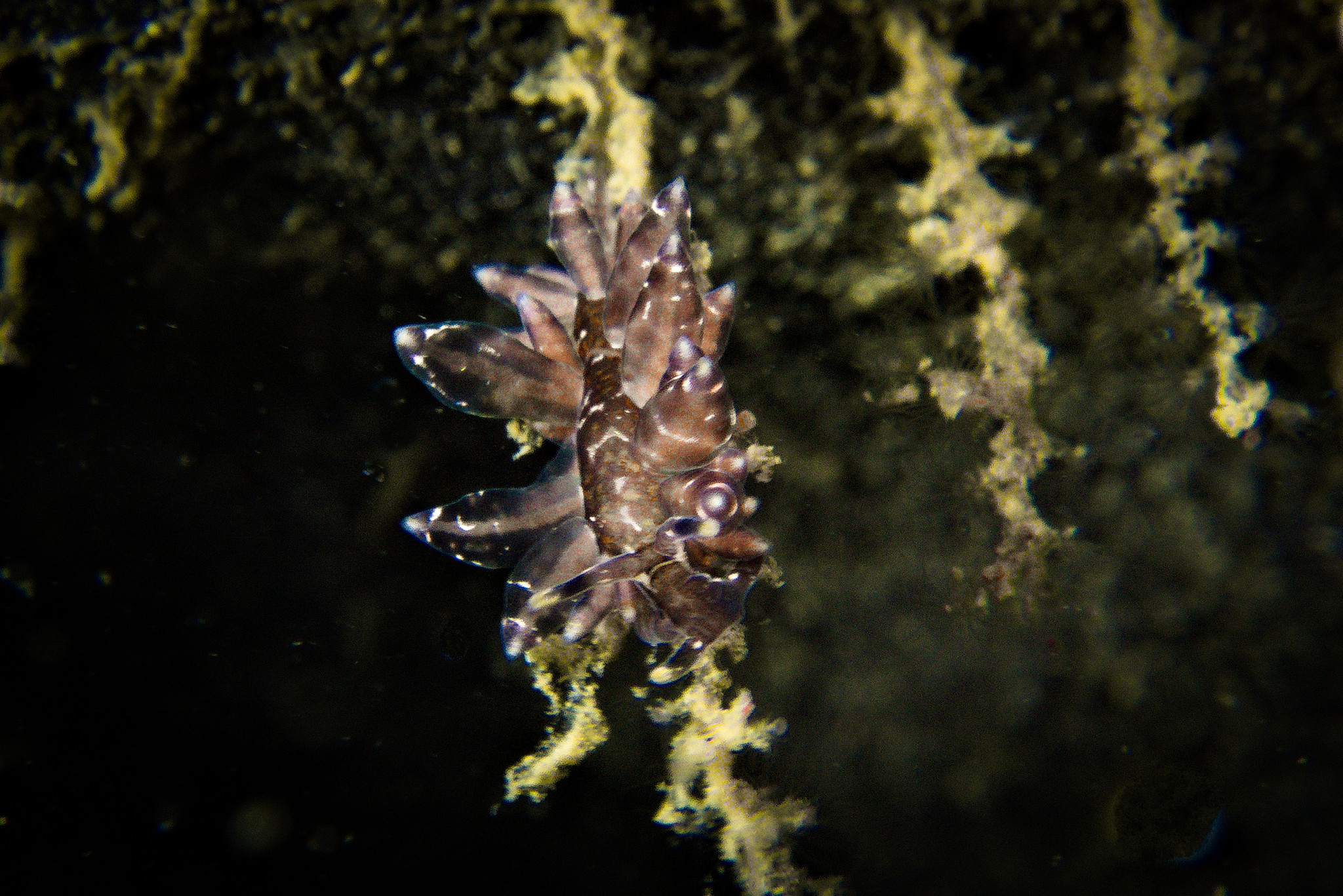

Scientific classification
- Kingdom: Animalia
- Phylum: Mollusca
- Class: Gastropoda
- Order: Nudibranchia
- Suborder: Aeolidacea
- Family: Eubranchidae
- Genus: Amphorina
- Species: A. viriola

Binomial name
- Amphorina viriola Korshunova, Malmberg, Prkić, Petani, Fletcher, Lundin & Martynov, 2020

= Amphorina viriola =

Species of gastropod

Amphorina viriola is a species of sea slug or nudibranch, a marine gastropod mollusc in the family Eubranchidae.

== Distribution ==
This species was described from close to Svarte Jan lighthouse (59°06′30″N 11°19′30″E), Iddefjord, Sweden, Skagerrak, NE Atlantic.
