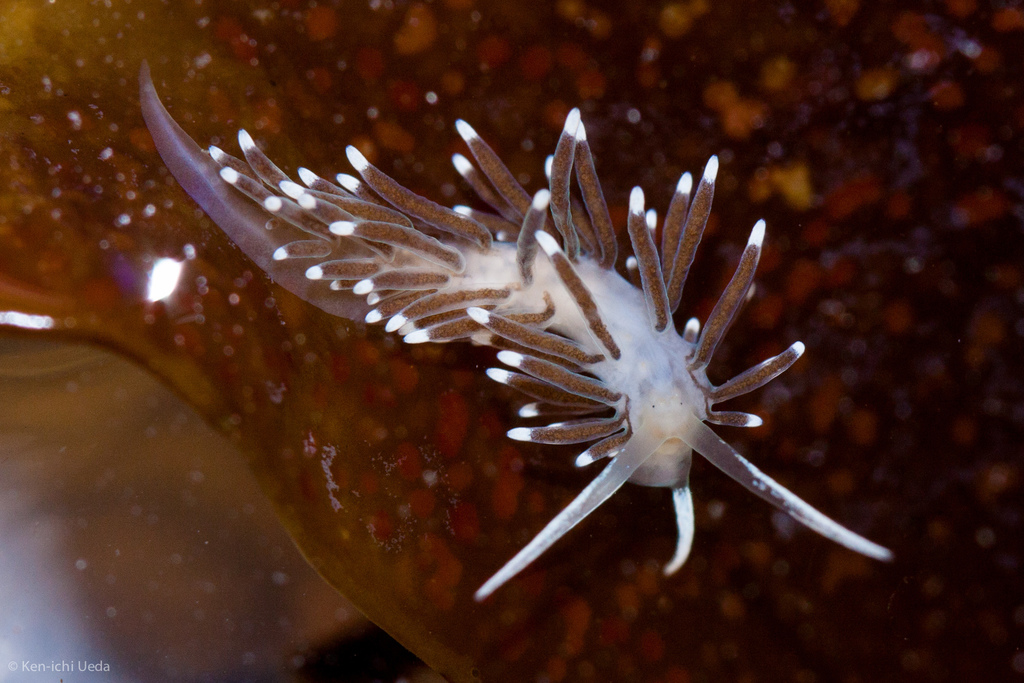

Scientific classification
- Kingdom: Animalia
- Phylum: Mollusca
- Class: Gastropoda
- Order: Nudibranchia
- Suborder: Aeolidacea
- Family: Cuthonellidae
- Genus: Margina
- Species: M. cocoachroma

Binomial name
- Margina cocoachroma (Williams & Gosliner, 1979)

Synonyms
- Cuthona cocoachroma G. C. Williams & Gosliner, 1979; Cuthonella cocoachroma G. C. Williams & Gosliner, 1979

= Margina cocoachroma =

Species of sea slug

Margina cocoachroma is a species of sea slug, an aeolid nudibranch, a marine gastropod mollusc in the family Cuthonellidae.

== Distribution ==
This species was described from Duxbury Reef, San Francisco, United States. It has been reported as far north as the Olympic Peninsula, Washington.
