= Ulebergshamn =

Coordinates: 58°27′N 11°18′E

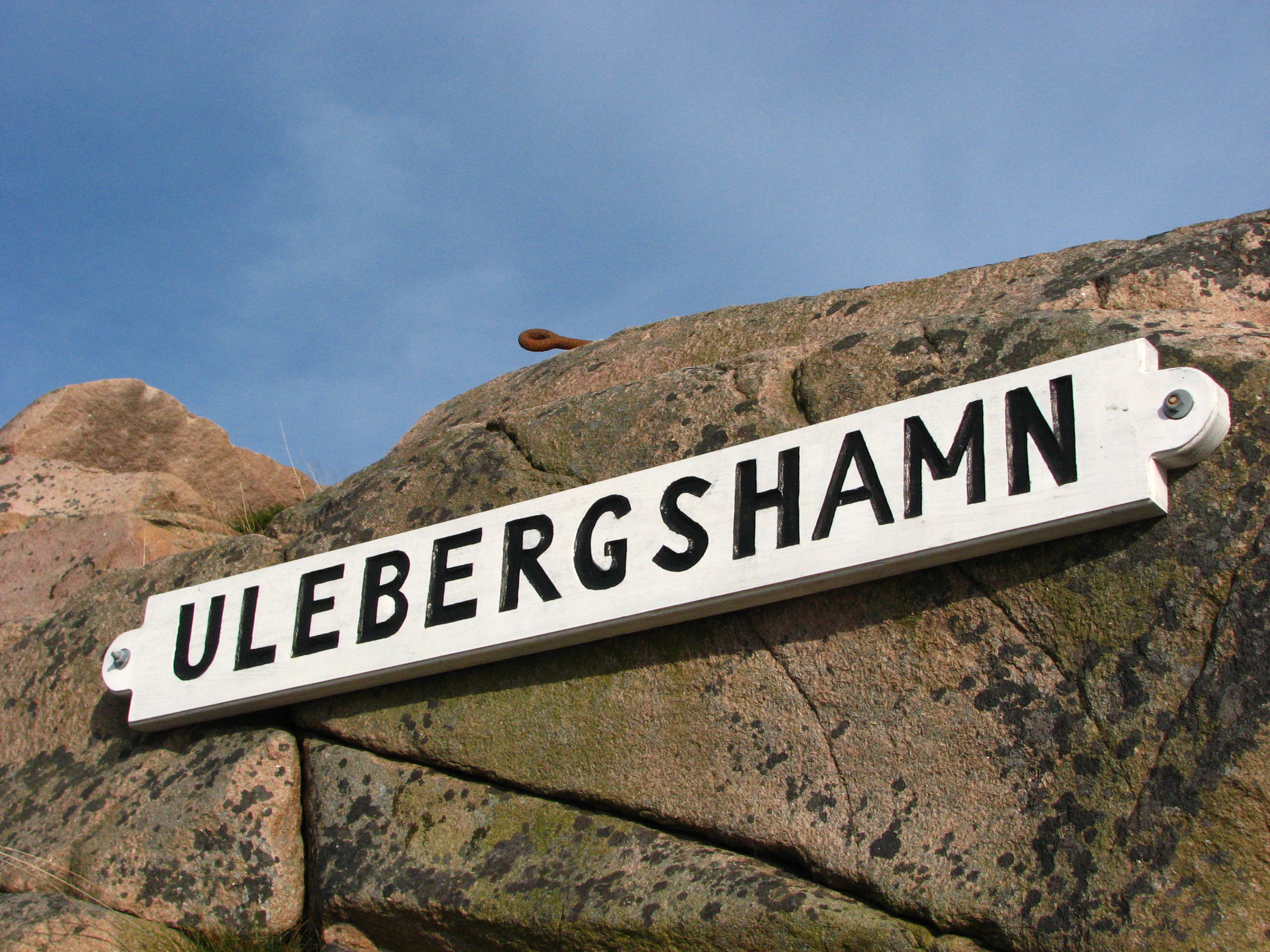
A sign that reads “Ulsbergshamn” taken in the harbour of Ulebergshamn.

Ulebergshamn is a village located in Sotenäs Municipality, Västra Götaland County, Sweden with 205 inhabitants in 2010.

It is surrounded by many islands which are rich in red granite, specific to the region. Majority of the Granite can be found on Räkaö (shrimp island).
