= Hunnebostrand =

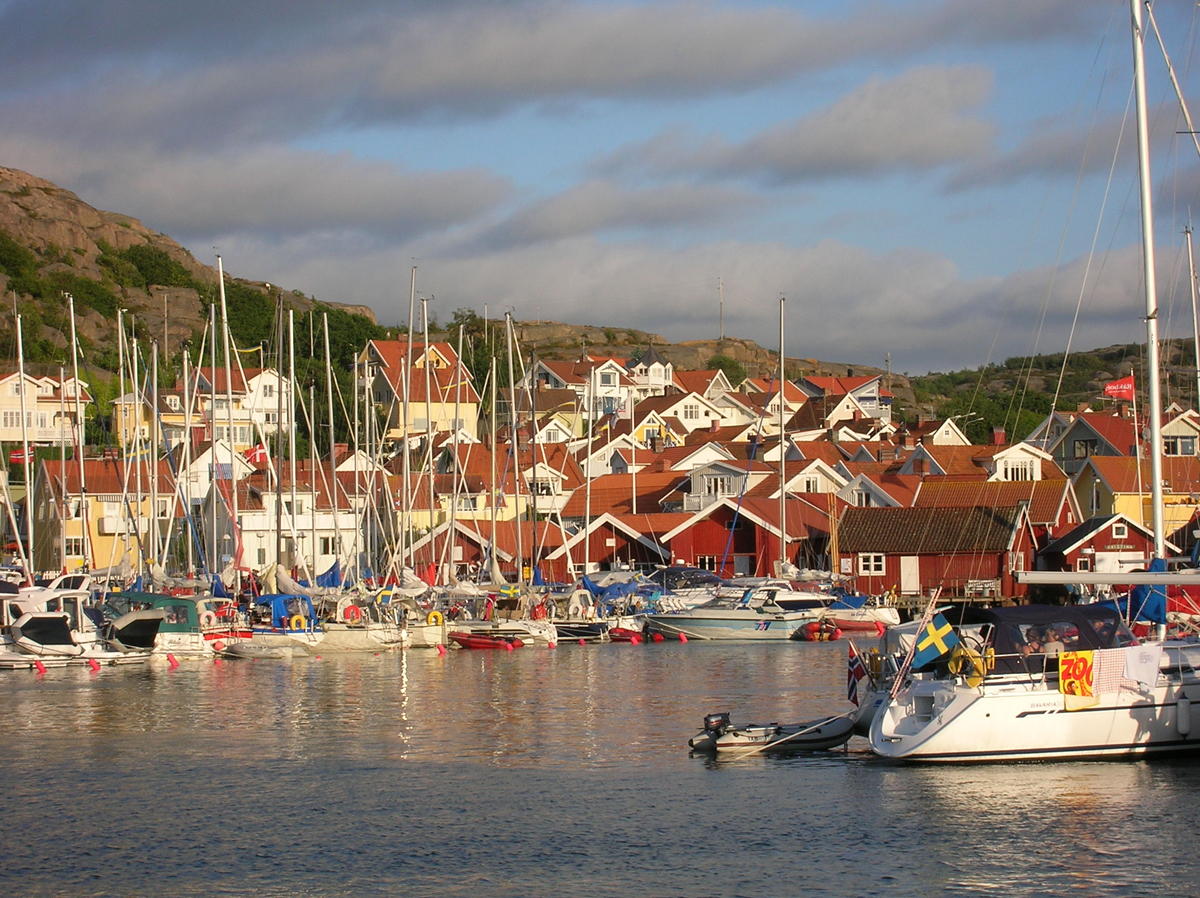
- The harbour in Hunnebostrand

- Location within Västra Götaland Location within Sweden
- Coordinates: 58°26′30″N 11°18′10″E
- Country: Sweden
- Province: Bohuslän
- County: Västra Götaland County
- Municipality: Sotenäs Municipality

Area
  - Total: 1.68 km^{2} (0.65 sq mi)

Population (31 December 2010)
  - Total: 1,731
  - Density: 1,033/km^{2} (2,680/sq mi)
- Time zone: UTC+1 (CET)
  - Summer (DST): UTC+2 (CEST)

Hunnebostrand is a locality situated in Sotenäs Municipality, Västra Götaland County, Sweden with 1,731 inhabitants in 2010.
