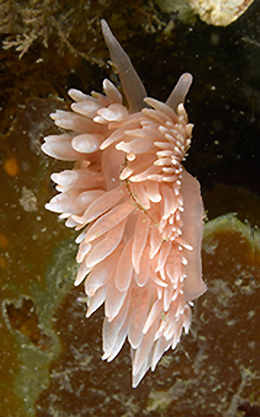
- Cuthonella abyssicola kryos

Scientific classification
- Kingdom: Animalia
- Phylum: Mollusca
- Class: Gastropoda
- Order: Nudibranchia
- Suborder: Aeolidacea
- Family: Cuthonellidae
- Genus: Cuthonella
- Species: C. abyssicola

Binomial name
- Cuthonella abyssicola Friele, 1902

Synonyms
- Cuthona abyssicola Bergh, 1884; Cuthona berghi Friele, 1902; Cuthona ferruginea Friele, 1903; Cuthonella berghi Friele, 1903; Cuthonella ferruginea Friele, 1903

= Cuthonella abyssicola =

Species of gastropod

Cuthonella abyssicola is a species of sea slug, an aeolid nudibranch, a marine gastropod mollusc in the family Cuthonellidae. Within it are two subspecies: Cuthonella abyssicola abyissicola and Cuthonella abyssicola kryos.

== Distribution ==
This species was described from a single specimen collected at 550 m depth in the Denmark Strait at 66°42′N 26°40′W.
