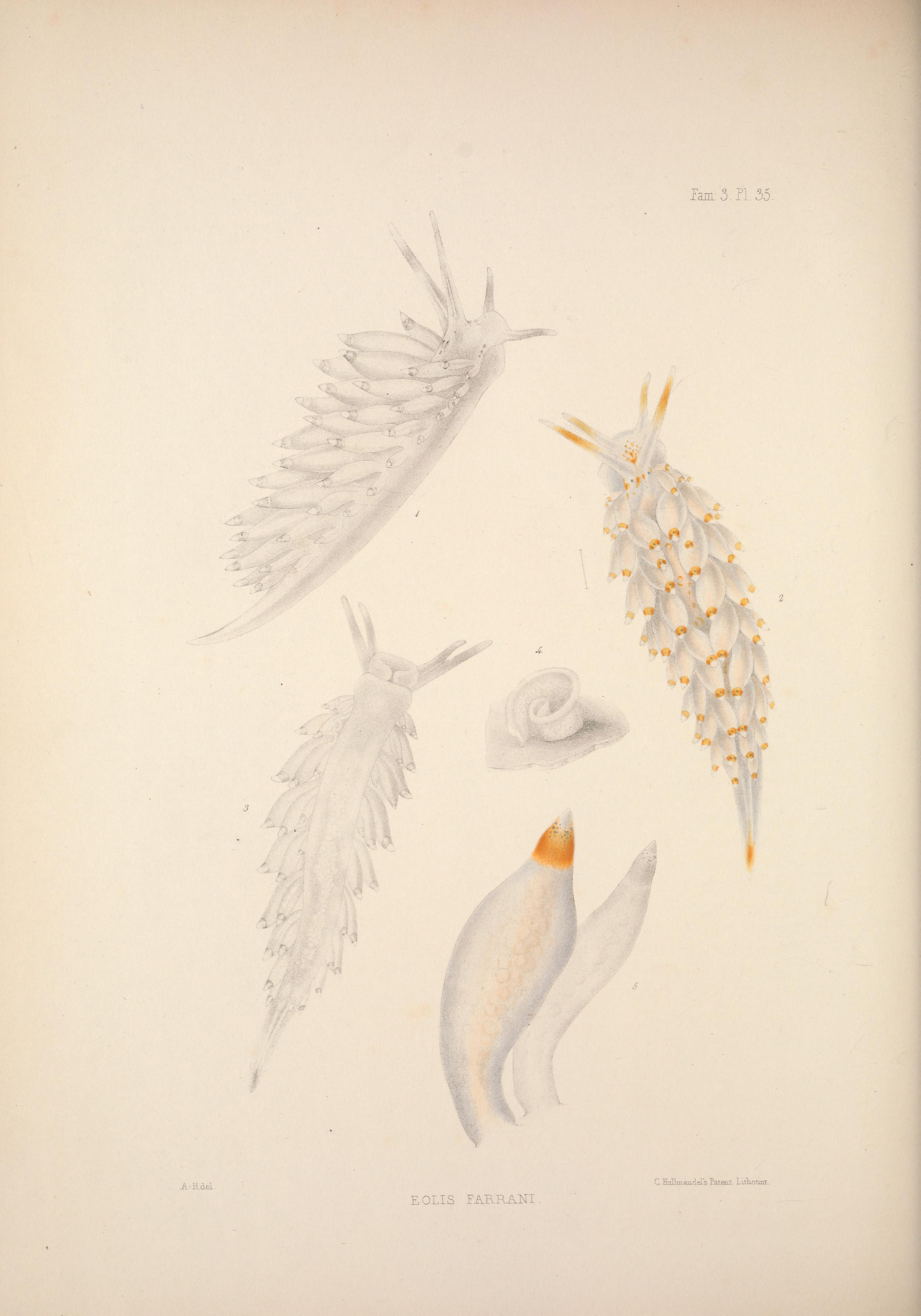
- Plate from Alder & Hancock (1845-1855)

Scientific classification
- Kingdom: Animalia
- Phylum: Mollusca
- Class: Gastropoda
- Order: Nudibranchia
- Suborder: Aeolidacea
- Family: Eubranchidae
- Genus: Amphorina
- Species: A. farrani

Binomial name
- Amphorina farrani (Alder & Hancock, 1844)

Synonyms
- Aeolis adelaidae Thompson, 1860; Amphorina alberti Quatrefages, 1844; Cavolina farrani (Alder & Hancock, 1844); Eolidia flavescens Risso, 1826; Eolis adelaidae Thompson W., 1859; Eolis andreapolis MacIntosh, 1865; Eolis farrani Alder & Hancock, 1844 (basionym); Eolis robertianae MacIntosh, 1865; Galvina farrani (Alder & Hancock, 1844); Galvina flava Trinchese, 1879

= Amphorina farrani =

Species of gastropod

Amphorina farrani is a species of sea slug or nudibranch, a marine gastropod mollusc in the family Eubranchidae. Several species of Eubranchus were transferred to Amphorina in 2020.

== Distribution ==
This species was described from Malahide, Ireland. It has also been reported from the Atlantic coast of Norway and the Baltic Sea south to the Mediterranean Sea.
