= Penistella elenae =

Scientific classification
- Kingdom: Animalia
- Phylum: Mollusca
- Class: Gastropoda
- Order: Nudibranchia
- Suborder: Aeolidacea
- Family: Cuthonellidae
- Genus: Penistella
- Species: P. elenae

Binomial name
- Penistella elenae Martynov, 2000

Synonyms
- Cuthona elenae Martynov, 2000; Cuthonella elenae Martynov, 2000

Species of gastropod

Penistella elenae is a species of sea slug, an aeolid nudibranch, a marine gastropod mollusc in the family Cuthonellidae.

== Distribution ==
This species was described from Wrangel Island, Arctic Ocean, Russia.
