= Kungshamn =

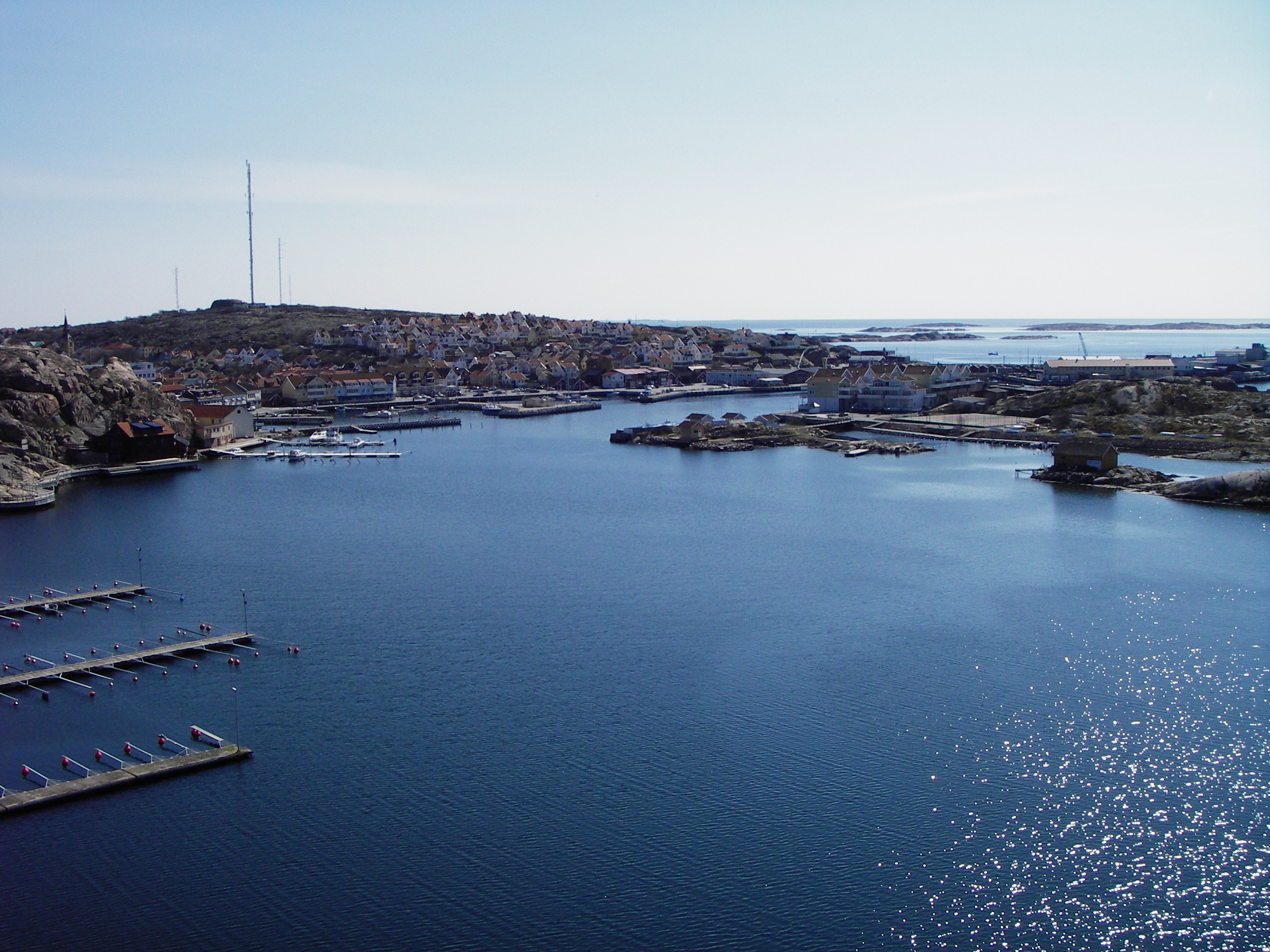
- Kungshamn

- Location within Västra Götaland Location within Sweden
- Coordinates: 58°22′N 11°15′E
- Country: Sweden
- Province: Bohuslän
- County: Västra Götaland County
- Municipality: Sotenäs Municipality

Area
  - Total: 2.08 km^{2} (0.80 sq mi)

Population (31 December 2010)
  - Total: 2,814
  - Density: 1,350/km^{2} (3,500/sq mi)
- Time zone: UTC+1 (CET)
  - Summer (DST): UTC+2 (CEST)

Kungshamn (King's Landing) is a locality and the seat of Sotenäs Municipality in Västra Götaland County, Sweden with 3071 citizens (in 2011). During summers, population is doubled multiple times, as Kungshamn is a popular tourist visit.

The town consists of the former towns of "Gravarne", "Bäckevik" and "Fisketången". Kungshamn is situated on a peninsula just north of Lysekil and on the same latitude as Uddevalla, Skövde and Linköping. Since 1970, the town is connected to the Smögen island by a bridge.

Kungshamn is known for its fishing industry. The Abba Seafood company is located next to Smögen Bridge. Since 1920, all products for the company have been manufactured in the town.

== Name ==
The direct translation of Kungshamn is "King's harbour" but mostly known as and correctly translated to "King's Landing". The name implies a connection to a king, but its origin is unknown. The locality was named Kungshamn in the 1960s. Before the renaming, it consisted of the smaller settlements Gravarne, Bäckevik and Fisketången. The names referred to the small communities located in the "Kungshamn area". Gravarne was the most commonly used in the late 20th century and fishermen used that name on their boats to identify their home port.

== History ==
All of Bohuslän used to belong to Norway until it was seceded to Sweden in the 1658 Treaty of Roskilde. During the Middle Ages, foreigners were attracted by the rich herring fishing and therefore came to the west coast of Sweden to fish herring and later export it. Toll houses were established and one of the largest was in Kungshamn. Due to the herring fishing more and more people came to settle down in the Kungshamn locality. A more permanent village was established during the 19th century, due to a period of exceptional rich herring fishing.

== Nature ==
The north eastern part of Kungshamn is forested. The landscape is characteristic for Bohuslän, with predominantly bare granite cliffs intersected by deep valleys with shrub bog areas, rich with birdlife. In the forest there is a 60 km (37 mi) hiking trail. The trail goes through Kungshamn and continues into other localities within the Sotenäs Municipality.

== Sports ==
The following sports clubs are located in Kungshamn:

- Kungshamns IF

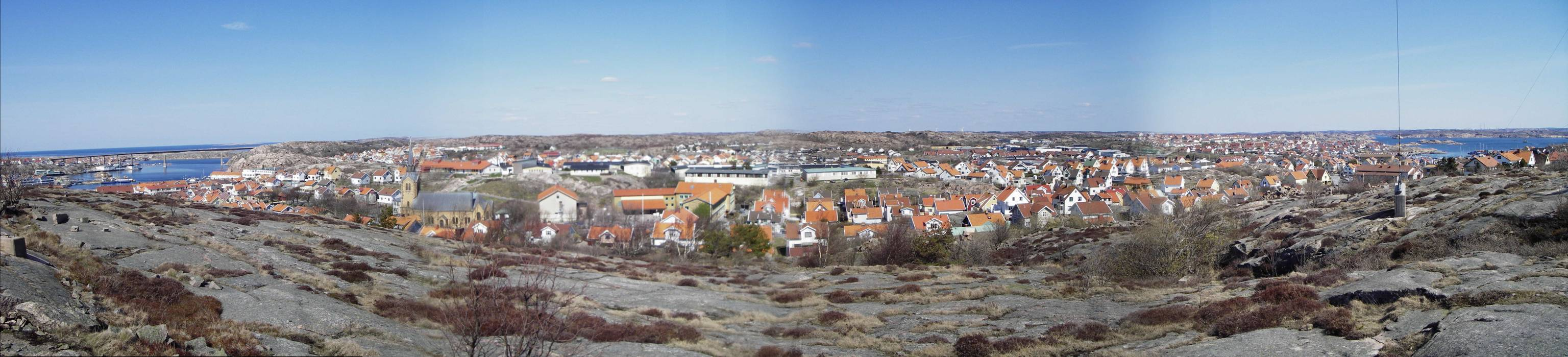
Panorama
