= Smögen =

- Locality
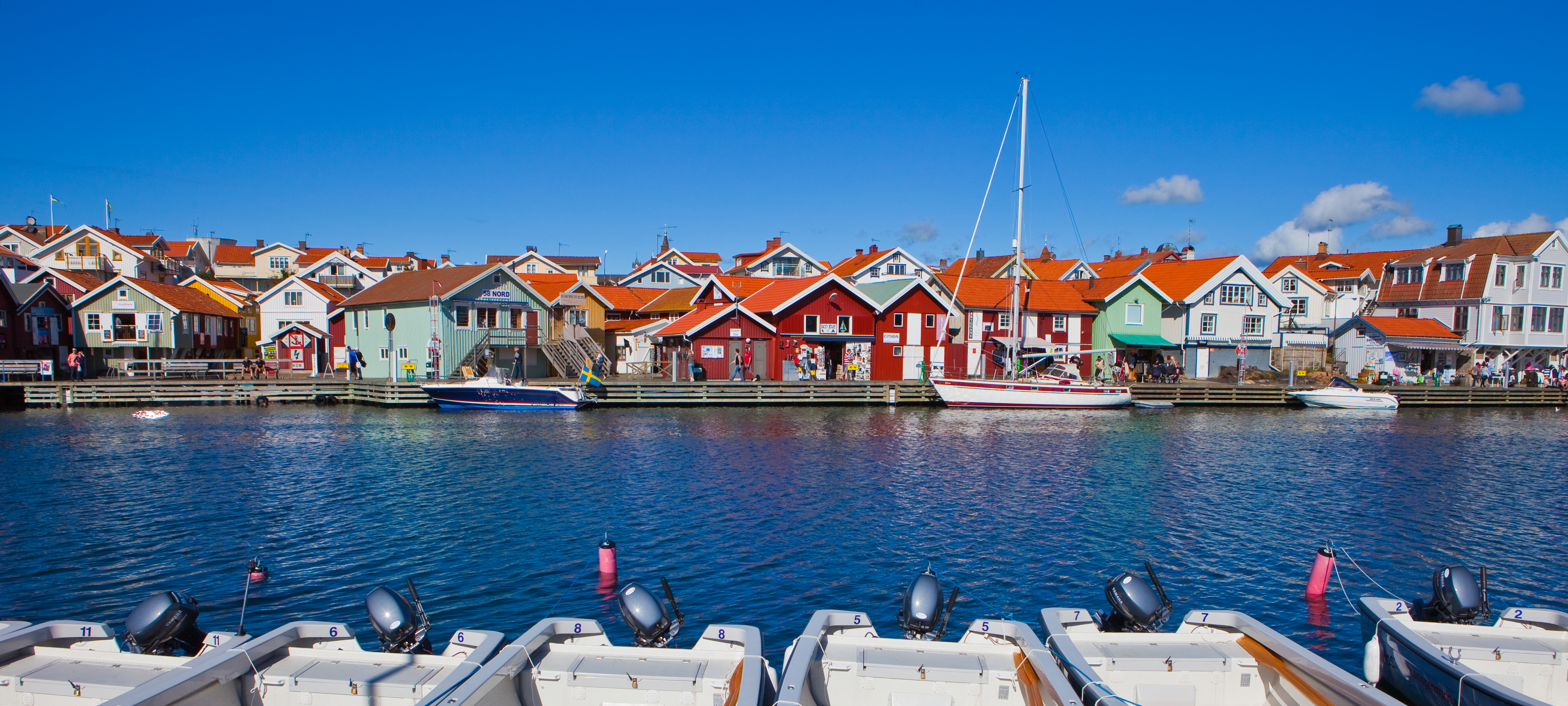
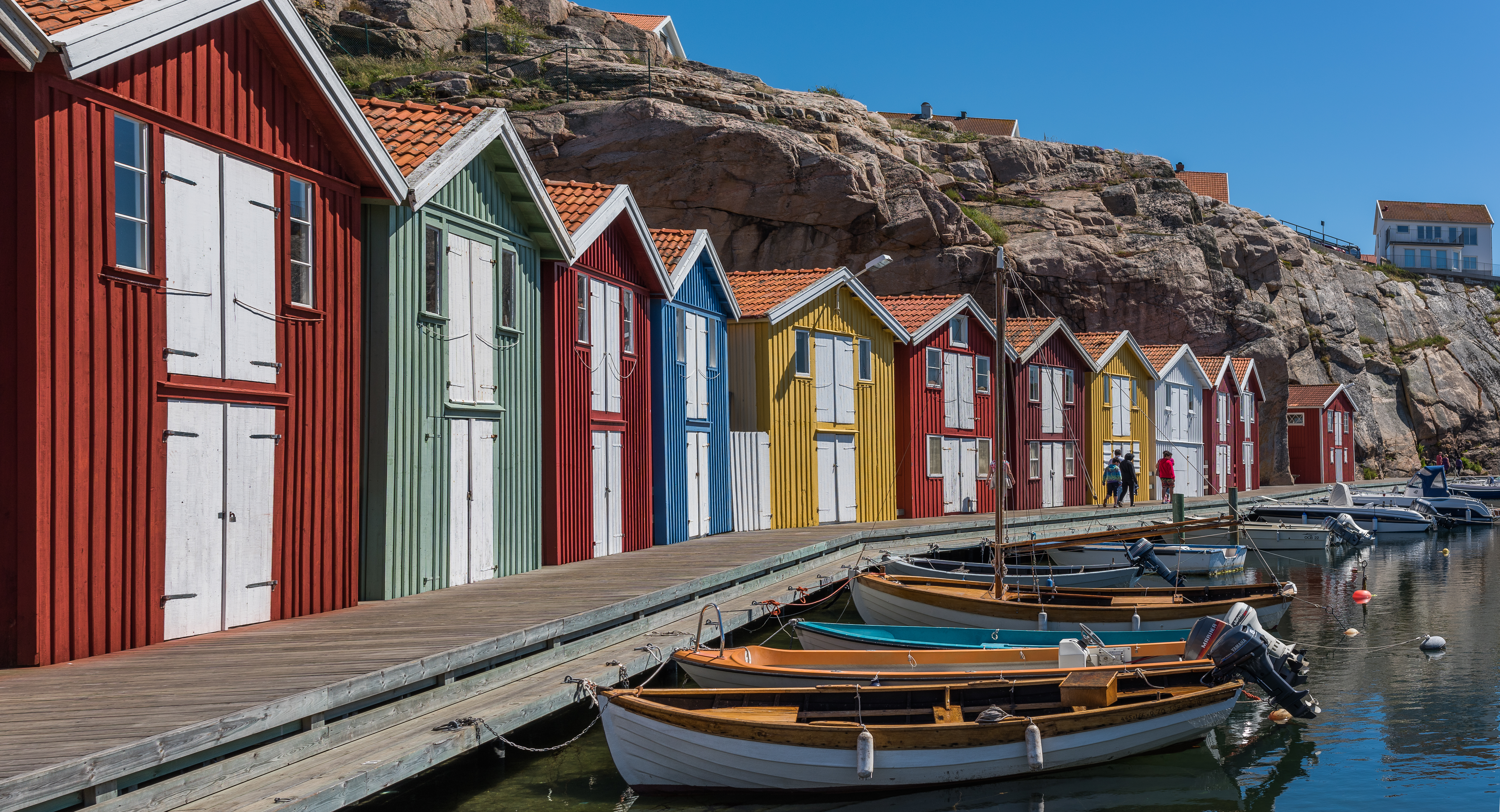
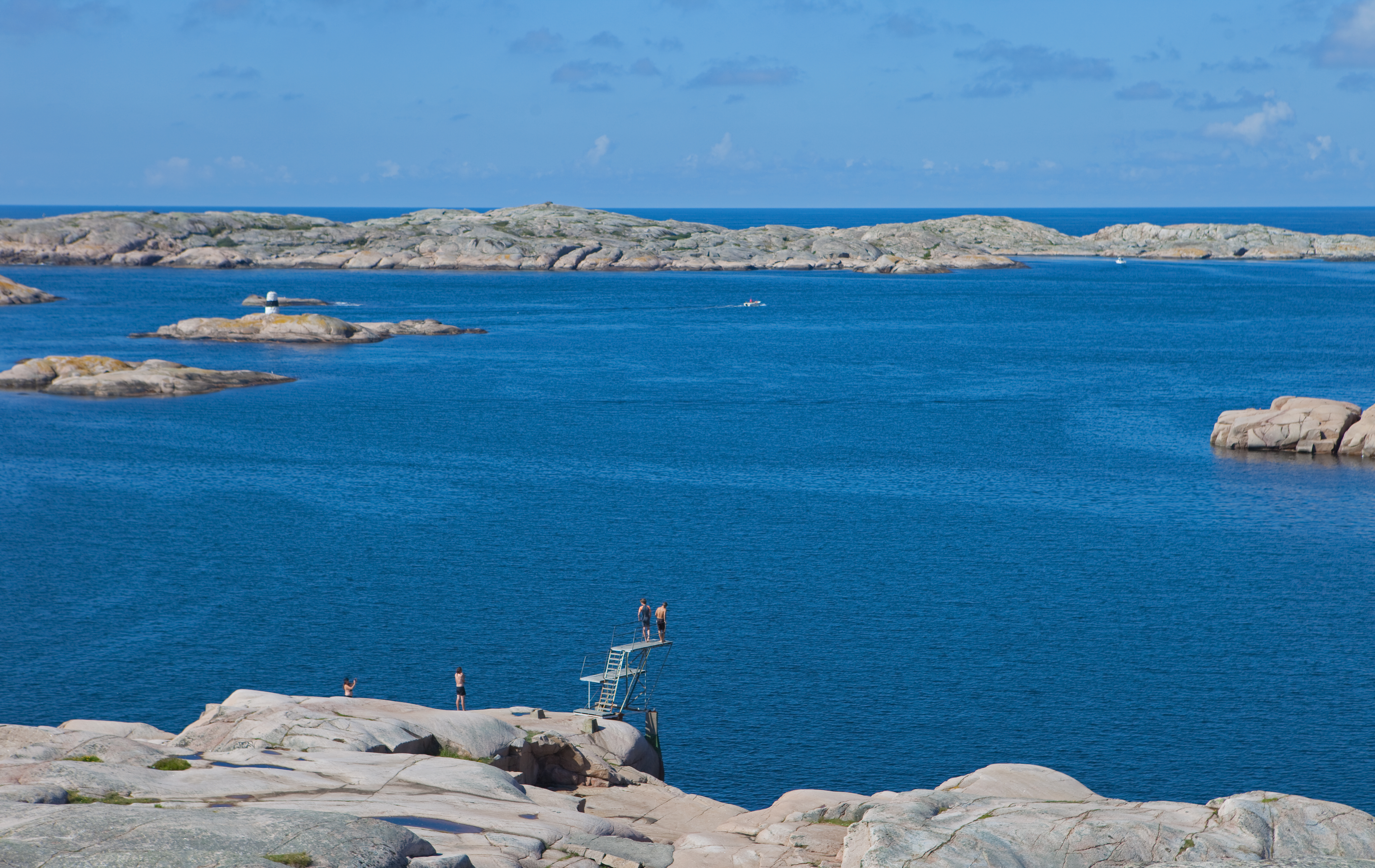
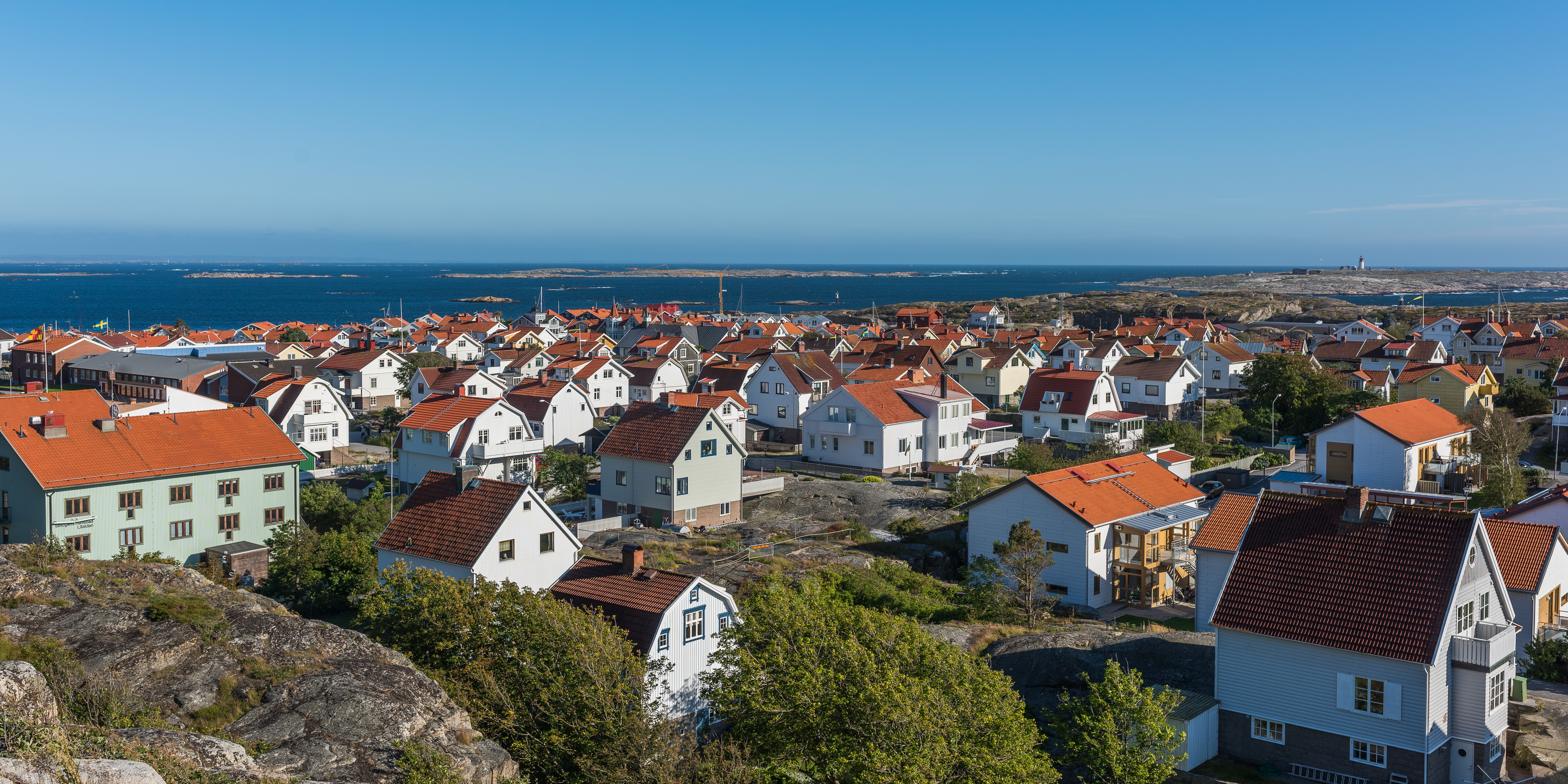

- Location within Västra Götaland Location within Sweden
- Coordinates: 58°21′40″N 11°13′55″E
- Country: Sweden
- Province: Bohuslän
- County: Västra Götaland County
- Municipality: Sotenäs Municipality

Area
  - Total: 1.05 km^{2} (0.41 sq mi)

Population (31 December 2010)
  - Total: 1,329
  - Density: 1,267/km^{2} (3,280/sq mi)
- Time zone: UTC+1 (CET)
  - Summer (DST): UTC+2 (CEST)

Smögen (Swedish pronunciation: [ˈsmø̌ːɡɛn]), facing the Skagerrak strait is a locality in Sotenäs Municipality, Västra Götaland County, Sweden with 1,329 inhabitants in 2010. It is one of the liveliest "summer towns" of the Swedish west coast.

The community actually straddled several islands that lay so close together that the space in between has since been filled, and is now considered a single island. The southern part consists mostly of Smögen Island, which lies in the centre. Around this lie Kleven to the south, Sandön to the northwest, and Hasselön to the northeast. The town is connected to the neighbouring town Kungshamn by Smögenbron (Smögen Bridge).

== History ==
Smögen is mentioned for the first time towards the end of the 16th century. The name of the community has varied over the years; amongst other names, from "Smögit", "Smöenn", "Smöget", and "Smygesund". The name has probably come from the Swedish word smyghål, which translates as "sneak-hole" or "nook", referring to the narrow inlet between the Smögen island and where the harbour lies. According to the Swedish Institute for Language and Folklore, the community's name comes from *smög, which has the same meaning and survives as smuga in Old West Norse and modern Bohuslän dialects. Around the 17th century, the island Hasselön was populated. Through the years, this community has grown together with Smögen and is today considered a part of the Smögen community.

== Tourism ==
In modern times, Smögen is well known for its long, wooden pier, about 600 m (2,000 ft), filled with shops in old fishing huts, which are frequented by a multitude of tourists during the summer. Smögen is one of the most popular tourist destinations on the Swedish west coast, well known for its fish, prawns, and other seafood, and one of Sweden's few fish markets is located here. There is also an extensive nightlife scene, with many bars, clubs, and concert venues open during the summer.
