= Guyvalvoria paradoxa =

Scientific classification
- Kingdom: Animalia
- Phylum: Mollusca
- Class: Gastropoda
- Order: Nudibranchia
- Suborder: Aeolidacea
- Family: Murmaniidae
- Genus: Guyvalvoria
- Species: G. paradoxa

Binomial name
- Guyvalvoria paradoxa (Eliot, 1907)

Synonyms
- Cuthonella paradoxa Eliot, 1907

Species of gastropod

Guyvalvoria paradoxa is a species of sea slug, an aeolid nudibranch, a marine gastropod mollusc in the family Murmaniidae.

== Description ==
(Original description) The species is characterized by a yellow coloration, featuring traces of reddish-brown and several minute reddish dots upon the larger cerata. When viewed through the integuments, the intestines and hepatic diverticula appear reddish-brown. In terms of dimensions, the animal measures 11 mm in length, 8 mm in breadth, and 4.3 mm in height, with a pointed tail that extends 2.3 mm beyond the dorsum.

The oral tentacles are 2 mm long and point directly to the right and left. The rhinophores reach a length of 3 mm; they are stout, bent forward, and marked by transverse rings, though it remains unclear whether these rings are natural features or the result of contraction during preservation.

On the left side of the body, a single line of twelve cerata runs along the dorsal margin. These are conical and none exceed 1 mm in height; however, the presence of gaps suggests that this line may be incomplete. Within this outer line, a single, very large papilla remains attached, measuring approximately 7 mm in length and appearing somewhat bent. This papilla is situated behind and slightly to the left of the anal papilla. On the right-hand side, a similar line of twelve cerata exists, most of which are slightly larger than those on the left. Positioned beneath the first three of these is a second row consisting of three very small cerata. Seven detached cerata were also found in the specimen bottle, measuring between 2 mm and 7 mm in length. The anal papilla is located dorsally and set far back—7 mm from the anterior end—and slightly to the right of the median line. The genital orifices are situated 4 mm from the anterior end, placed relatively high upon the side of the body.

The anterior end of the body forms a hood over the mouth, which appears ventral in the preserved state. The foot is rounded at the front and thickened at the margin; while it is slightly expanded, it is neither grooved nor produced into tentaculiform angles. Although the internal organs are somewhat decomposed, they appear typical of the Aeolididse family. The jaws are thin and yellow, featuring a single row of distinct denticles that vary between pointed and blunt shapes. The uniseriate radula consists of thirty-one reddish-yellow teeth, each with seven distinct, fairly stout, and long denticles on either side of the central cusp.

The hepatic diverticula are irregular in outline, and the minute reddish dots appear to be located on the diverticula themselves rather than on the external surface of the cerata. Regarding the nervous system, the cerebro-pleural ganglia are roundish and considerably larger than the pedal ganglia, while the olfactory ganglia are round and positioned close together. No auditory organ was found. The hermaphrodite gland consists of both large and small lobes, and no armature was discovered on the verge. While the animal cannot be safely reconstructed from the preserved fragments, it appears to have possessed a fringe of small cerata around the dorsal area, with a few much larger ones grouped around the vent.

== Distribution ==
This species was described from Winter Quarters, Ross Sea, Antarctica. It has been reported from McMurdo Sound.
