= Galvinella antarctica =

Scientific classification
- Kingdom: Animalia
- Phylum: Mollusca
- Class: Gastropoda
- Order: Nudibranchia
- Suborder: Aeolidacea
- Family: Eubranchidae
- Genus: Galvinella
- Species: G. antarctica

Binomial name
- Galvinella antarctica (Eliot, 1907)

Synonyms
- Cuthona elioti Odhner, 1944; Cuthonella antarctica Eliot, 1907; Cuthonella elioti Odhner, 1944

Species of gastropod

Galvinella antarctica is a species of sea slug, an aeolid nudibranch, a marine gastropod mollusc in the family Eubranchidae.

== Distribution ==
This species was described from Winter Quarters Bay, Ross Sea, Antarctica. It has been found on several occasions in McMurdo Sound, Ross Sea, Antarctica 77°51′02.31″S 166°39′56.07″E.
