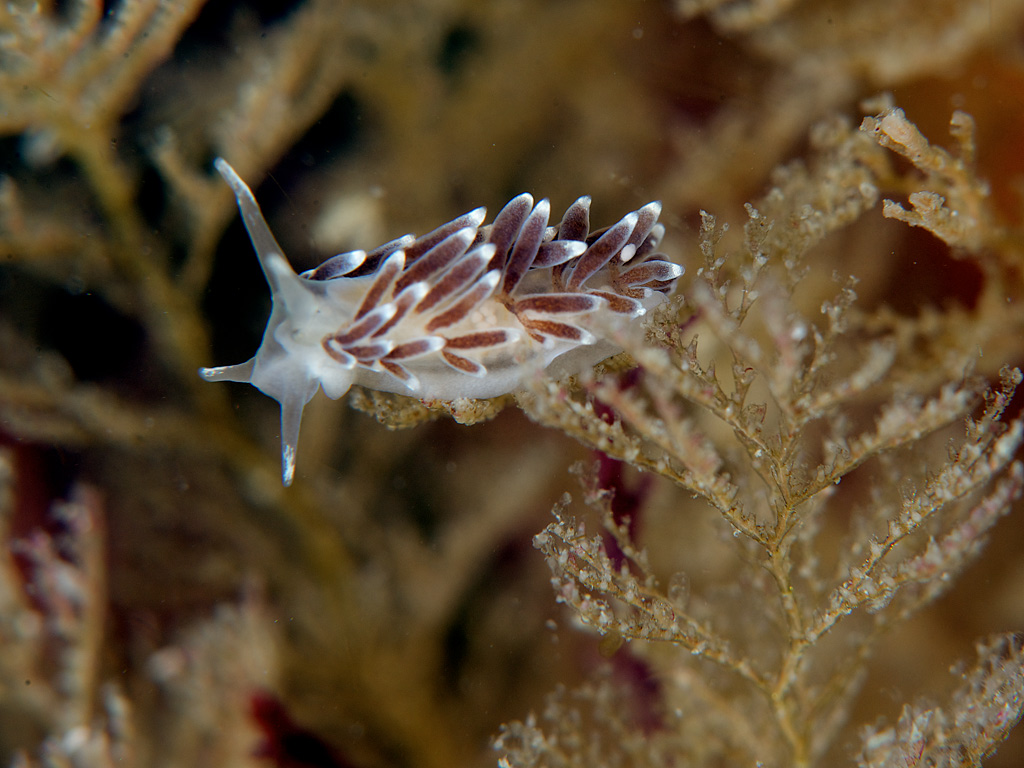
- Fiocuthona concinna, Strangford Lough, County Down, Northern Ireland.

Scientific classification
- Kingdom: Animalia
- Phylum: Mollusca
- Class: Gastropoda
- Order: Nudibranchia
- Suborder: Aeolidacea
- Superfamily: Fionoidea
- Family: Cuthonellidae; Miller, 1971

Genera
- See Genera

= Cuthonellidae =

Family of gastropods

Cuthonellidae is a family of nudibranchs, shell-less marine gastropod molluscs or sea slugs, within the superfamily Fionoidea.

== Taxonomic history ==
This family was reinstated as a result of a molecular phylogenetics study.

== Genera ==
Genera within the family Cuthonellidae include:

- Cratenopsis Lemche, 1935
- Cuthonella Bergh, 1884
- Fiocuthona Martynov, 1992
- Margina Martynov and Korshunova, 2025
- Nella Martynov and Korshunova, 2025
- Penistella Martynov and Korshunova, 2025
- Victima Martynov and Korshunova, 2025
