= Nadderud =

District of Bærum, Norway

Coordinates: 59.9250°N 10.5923°E

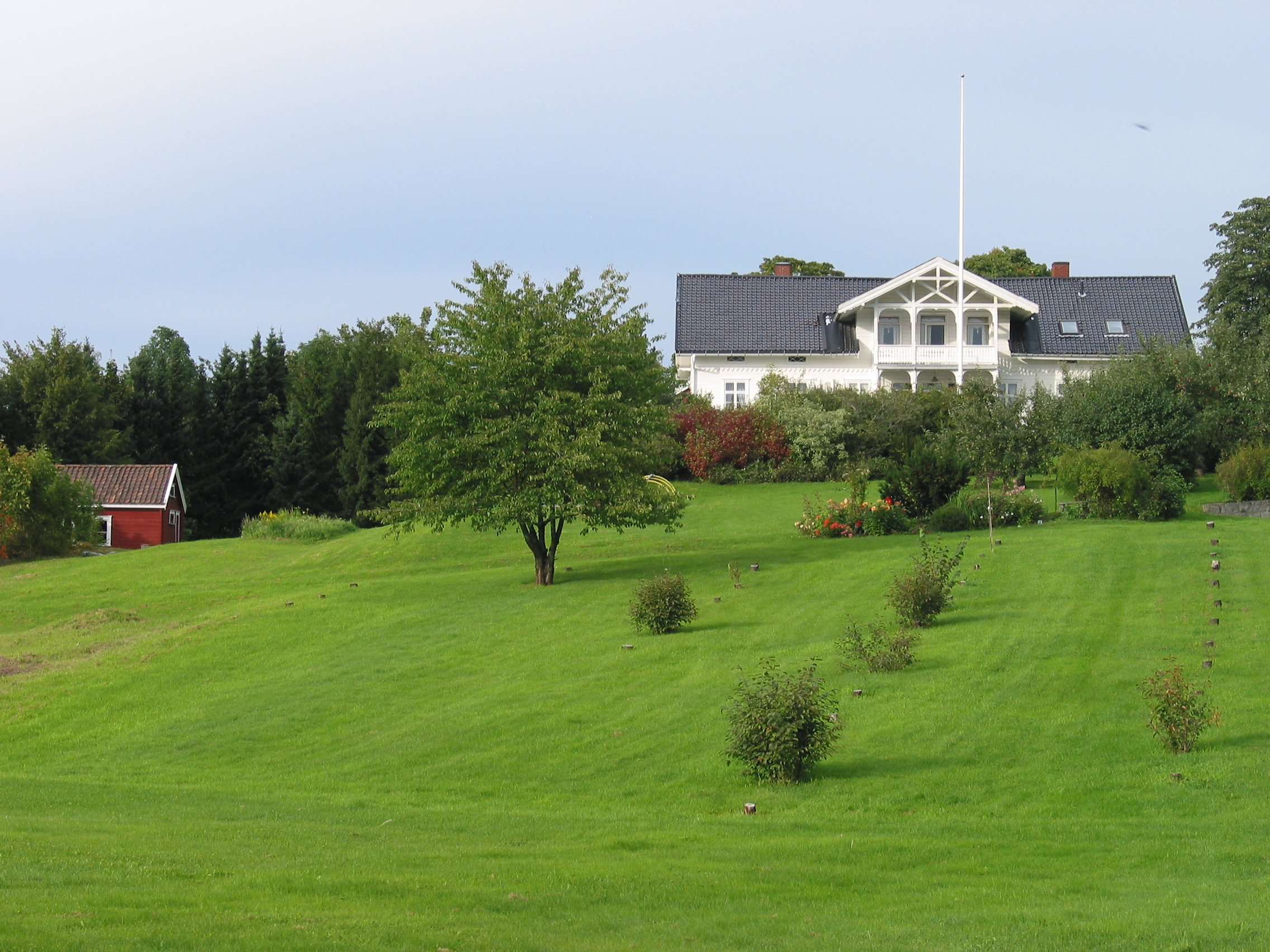
(Upper) Nadderud farm.

Nadderud is a district in eastern Bærum, Norway. It was formerly farmland under one of Bærum's larger farms, named Nadderud, but since the 1950s it has been built up with housing, several schools and sporting facilities. The best known facility, which has made the name Nadderud nationally known, is the stadium Nadderud stadion. Parts of the district Nadderud have been absorbed by the growing suburban centre Bekkestua.

== Geography ==
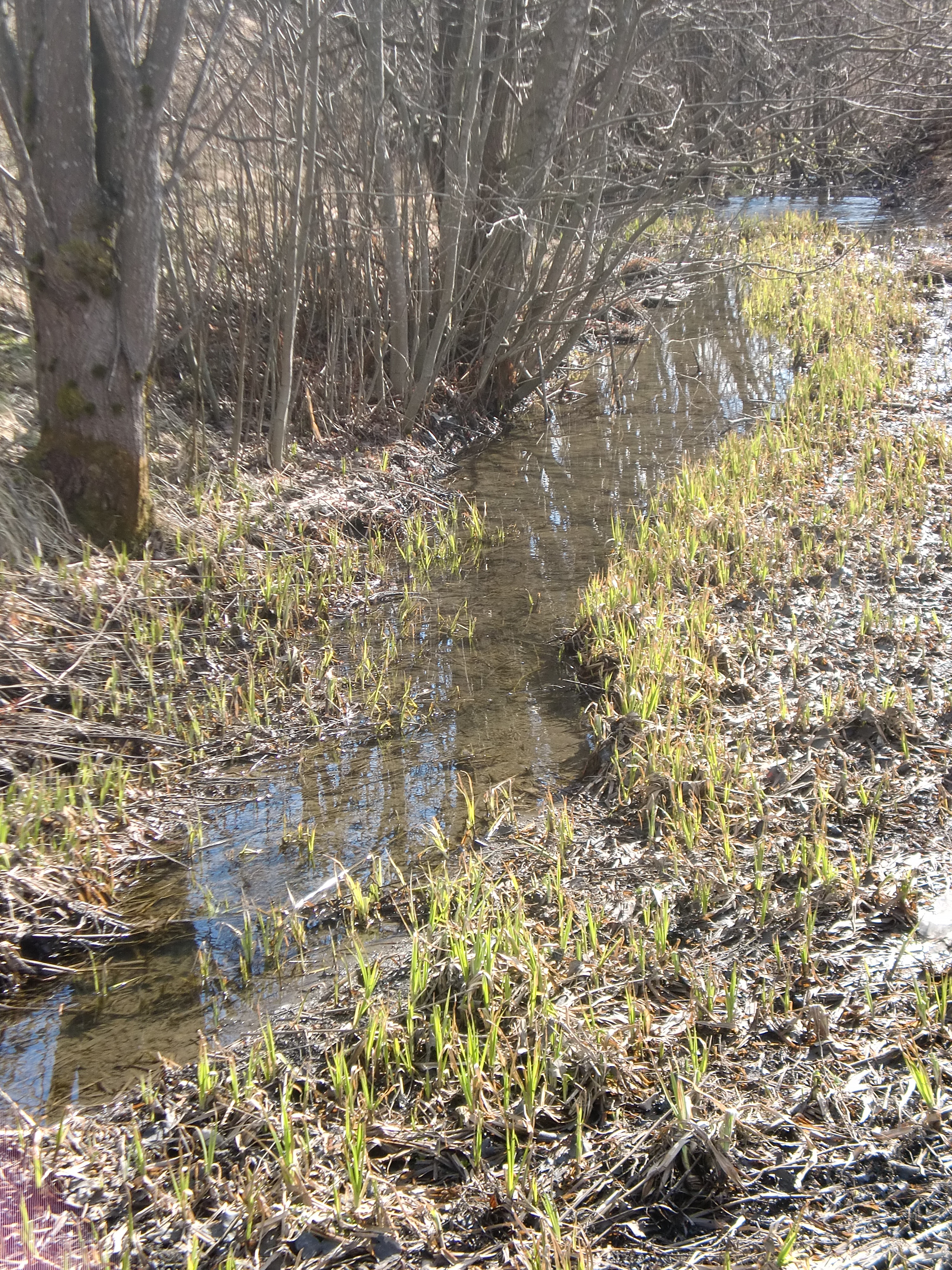
Part of Hoslebekken.

Today's meaning of Nadderud is the district north and west of Bekkestua, northeast of Gjønnes, east of Haslum, south of Hosle and southwest of Grav.

The district was formerly a watery area, with several small creeks combining into one before emptying into Øverlandselva. Most of the Nadderud Watershed (Norwegian: Nadderudvassdraget) has been led underground through a pipe system. One creek, Eiksbekken/Gravsbekken, originates north of Eiksmarka, and portions of it still exist. Another creek, Nadderudbekken, originated at Eikeli and flowed more or less in a straight southwestern direction, and at one point formed the pond Nadderuddammen. It was used for leisure ice skating during the winter, but exists no more. Another minor creek originated at Lønnås, and another creek Hoslebekken originated at Hosle. This is the only other significant portion of the watershed which is still visible. The confluence of the three main creeks is south of Gjønnes farm. After this, much of the riverbed is used as a pedestrian road between Gjønnes and the road Kirkeveien at Haslum. Where the creek crossed Kirkeveien, there was formerly a bridge, but it has been filled with solid material.

== History ==
The etymology of the name Nadderud is uncertain, but it has been recorded as Naderud (1434 and 1617), Narderudt (1557), Nadderudt (1578), but also Nadderud in older times (1594 and 1723). The suffix -rud indicates that someone cleared an area to make a farm. The farm Nadderud belonged to Hovedøya Monastery before the Protestant Reformation, then to the crown before getting a private owner from 1663, Jens Paulsen Grav. He was succeeded as owner by his son-in-law, and during this time the farm was a bailiff seat as well. Limestone burning was also conducted. Limestone was notably delivered to Akershus Fortress in 1629, to Moss in 1634 and to the Royal Palace in 1827.

In the 1750s the farm was split into Upper and Lower Nadderud. Lower Nadderud was sold in 1900 to a trade union, and was built up under the name Egne Hjem (from 1902), except for the property Bjerkelunden which became a small park. Upper Nadderud remained a farm, most notably under the ownership of Hans Burum from 1911 to his death in 1925. The farm had livestock, and also grew rare vegetables and fruits such as tomato, cucumber and melon, which proved especially important during World War I. The farm had eight horses, eighteen cattle and 25 sheep in 1826, and in 1939 the farm had four horses, 40 cattle and 365 swine. Farming at Nadderud was drastically reduced in the 1950s, and large parts of the farmland was sold. Villas were built, but also schools and sporting facilities.

Several sub-farms were originally part of Nadderud. The most notable is Presterud, located on the southern outskirts of Nadderud, close to Gjønnes farm. In modern times it had a greenhouse, and 20 decares of cultivated land. It has now been absorbed by Bekkestua.

== Sports ==
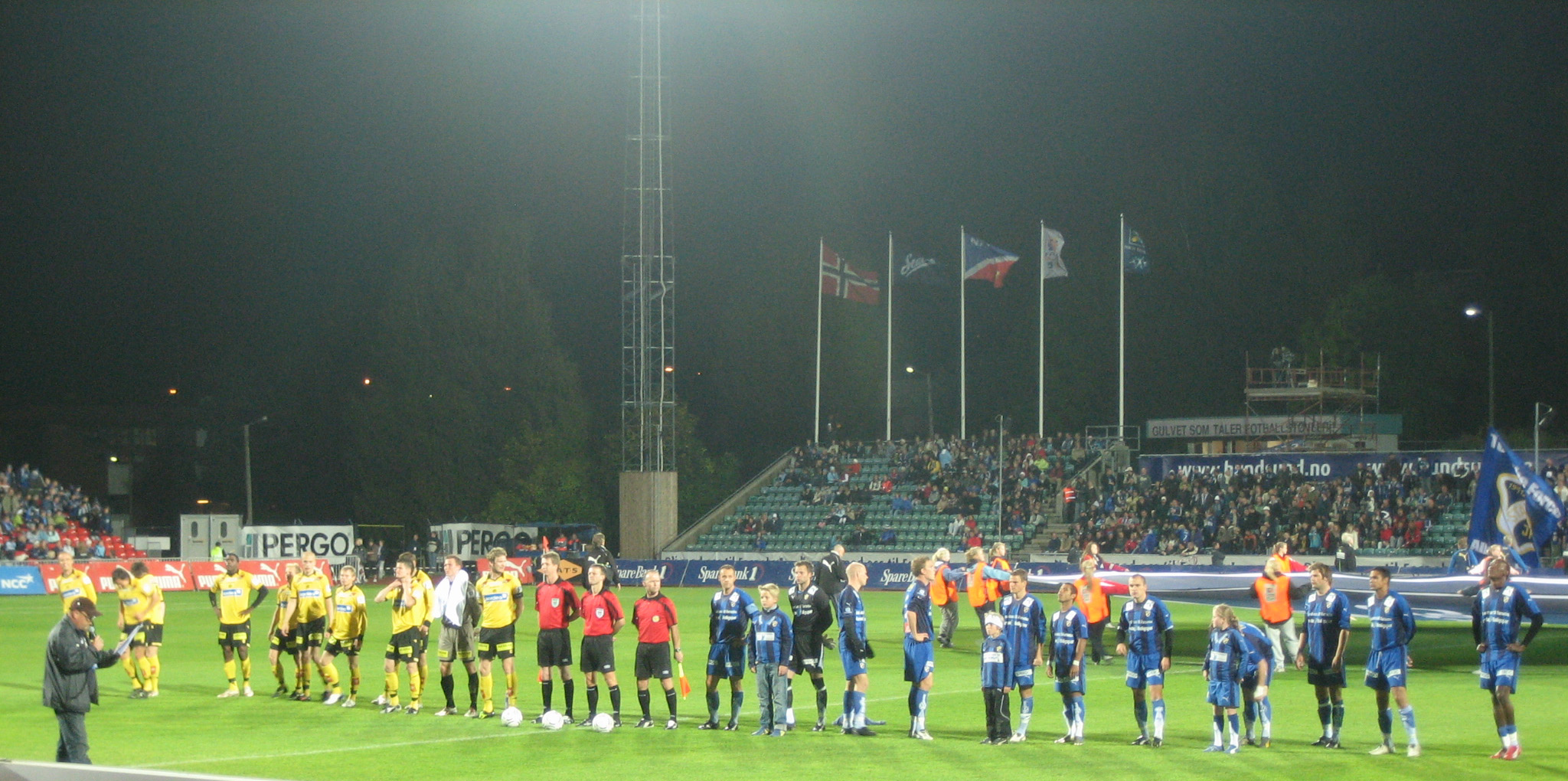
Stabæk faced Lillestrøm at Nadderud in 2007.

The district is nationally known for Nadderud stadion, the combined association football (used by Stabæk women, formerly Stabæk men, Bærum men and Jardar women) and track and field athletics stadium. It was finished in 1966.

The stadium is a part of a greater sports park. Nadderudhallen is a large complex mainly used for swimming, diving, team handball (used by Haslum men and Stabæk men and women), basketball and martial arts. Oslo International School has its own sports facilities, but is planning a new indoor venue adjacent to Nadderudhallen.

There are two artificial turf football fields named Nadderud kunstgress, and two grass fields named Nadderudfeltet and Bekkestuabanen respectively. The latter has been used as a training field by Norway national football team. Between the stadium and the hall is found a tennis court, used by the club Eiksmarka TK. Arena Bekkestua is an indoor venue for skateboarding, rollerblades, BMX and the like (and is also a minor concert hall). As an athletics stadium, Nadderud stadion has no warm-up field, but IL Tyrving operates a field for hammer throw and discus throw adjacent to Bekkestuabanen, because holding these events at Nadderud stadion is not compatible with maintaining a top-level football pitch.

== Education ==
=== Schools ===
An upper secondary school was established in 1958, not far from Gjønnes farm, under the name Nadderud. Politicians agreed to building the school in 1957, but it was only intended to last for five years. It had 326 students in 1958, 547 in 1965 and existed until 2004. In 2004 it was replaced by a new school between Gjønnes and Haslum; the name Nadderud was kept.

Oslo International School was established in 1963, but has not been located at Nadderud all the time, and got its current name in 1989. It is both a primary school, lower secondary school and upper secondary school with the International Baccalaureate program. A lower secondary school not far from Nadderud farm was established on 18 September 1968, under the name Bekkestua. Its size has shrunken from 662 students in 1970 to 372 students in 2005.

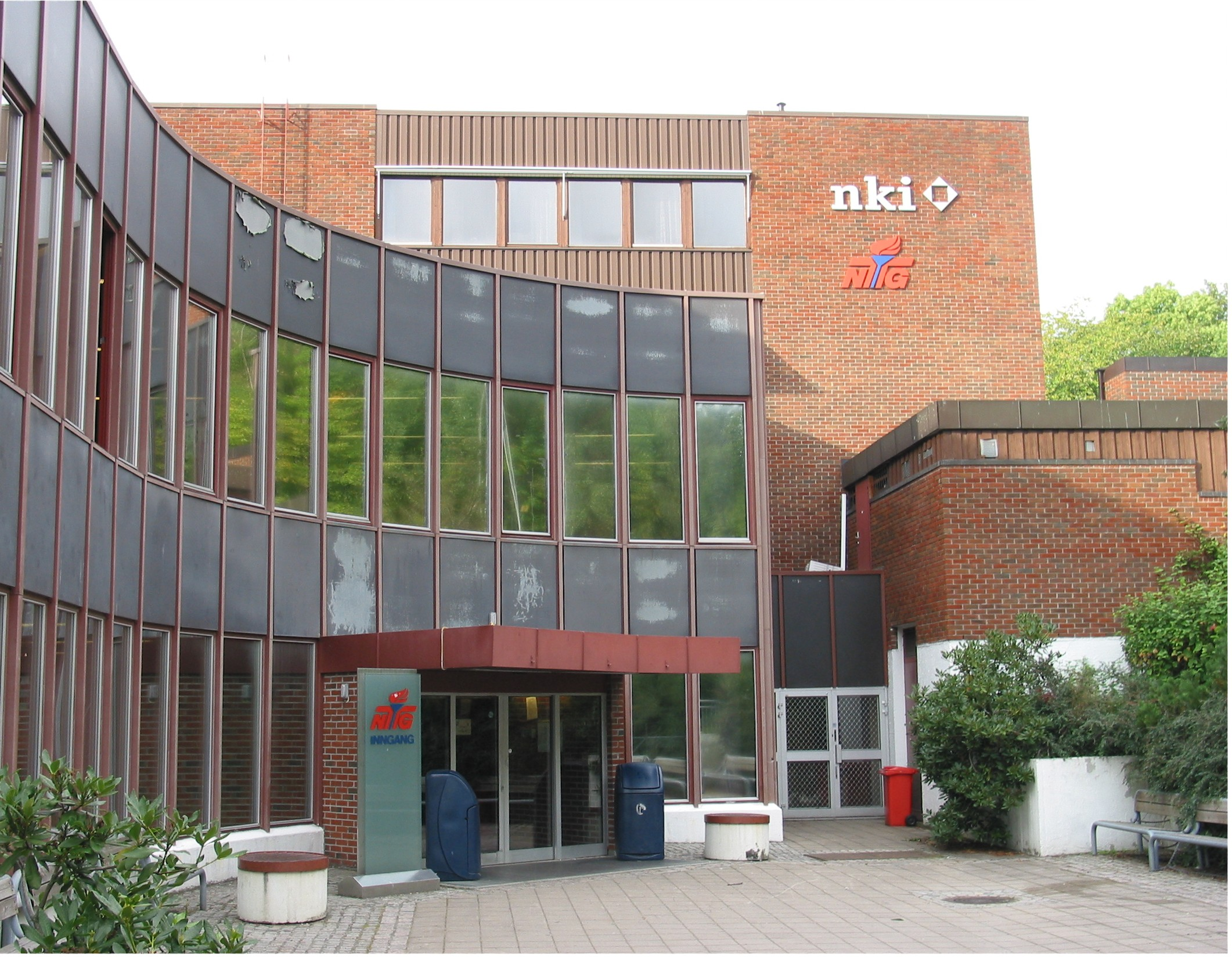
The Norwegian College of Elite Sport, incidentally not a college.

In 2003 the Norwegian College of Elite Sport (Norwegian: Norges Toppidrettsgymnas, NTG), which is not a college but an upper secondary school with sports, was moved from Vøyenenga to a site near Nadderud farm. Already in 2004 a lower secondary school, NTG-U, was added.

=== Higher education ===
The Norwegian College of Elite Sport was co-located with NKI Fjernundervisning, an institution for remote education which moved to Nadderud from Lysaker in 1989. NKI stands for "Norsk kunnskapsinstitutt". NKI decided to move from Nadderud to Oslo in 2012. Connected to NKI is the school Norwegian School of Information Technology, which was created in 1995, but moved to Oslo in 2003. Another related school Næringsakademiet was discontinued in 2007, the same year when all above institutions were bought by the company Anthon B Nilsen.

On the address of the Norwegian College of Elite Sport and NKI, Hans Burums vei 30, the Norwegian School of Management was located from 1979 until 1988 when it moved to Sandvika.

== Transport ==
A bus connection between Nadderud and Oslo has existed since 1952. The district is today served directly by lines 131 and 732 of Ruter's bus network, with many more operating from nearby Bekkestua; as well as the airport shuttle bus Flybussekspressen run by NOR-WAY Bussekspress. Nadderud is not directly served by rail transport; Bekkestua Station is the most proximate Oslo Metro station after Egne Hjem Station.
