= Gjønnes =

District of Bærum, Norway

Coordinates: 59.9181°N 10.5791°E

Gjønnes is a district in eastern Bærum, Norway.

== Geography and history ==
Gjønnes is the district southwest of Presterud, Nadderud and Bekkestua, south and east of Haslum, north of Ekeberg, Ramstad and Ballerud.

Geographically, the most significant feature of Gjønnes was the Nadderud Watershed (Norwegian: Nadderudvassdraget), with several small creeks from northern Bærum converging south of Gjønnes farm before continuing southwest towards Øverlandselva. Most of the creek system is now led underground through a pipe system. Much of the riverbed southwest of Gjønnes is used as a pedestrian road. A grinding mill was operated at Gjønnes, but it was only usable during flooding.

The name stems from the local farm, whose name has been recorded as Gieffnes (1578), Gioffuenes (1617) and Gionæs (1723). The farm has been owned by the Haslum family since 1883. In 1826 the farm was registered with 210 decares of crop, four horses, sixteen cattle and sixteen sheep. In 1939 it had 296 decares of crop, four horses, forty cattle, six swine and 25 chicken. Gjønnes farm also had a limestone oven. The former croft Kleiva was separated from Gjønnes in 1820. In 1939 Kleiva had 19 decares of crop, one horse, six cattle and 20 swine.

Farming later decreased significantly, and the periphery of the farmland was soon built up with housing. This development was spurred by the creation of the Kolsås Line light rail. The farm still exists, but in 2009 politicians agreed to allow housebuilding on much of the remaining soil.

== Sports and education ==
The upper secondary school Nadderud was raised at southern Nadderud, not far from Gjønnes farm, in 1958. Politicians agreed to building the school in 1957, and it had 326 students in its first year. The school building being temporary, it was only intended to exist for five years, but the number of students rose and it was necessary to proliferate the school's lifespan; in 1965 it had 547 students. The school was finally discontinued in 2004, being replaced by a new school between Gjønnes and Haslum; the name Nadderud was kept for the new school.

In conjunction with the new school, a new multi-sports hall called Gjønneshallen was completed in 2005. It was the largest sports complex in Bærum at the time. It has one section mainly for team handball, and another section with a small artificial turf football field, a strip with athletics rubber and a climbing wall. It also has rooms for weight training, spinning and the like. On the other side of the school is found the headquarters of Haslum's sports team Haslum IL; a small complex with two football fields (bandy during the winter) and an indoor hall mostly used for handball.

Before 1973, Stabæk IF operated a small ski jumping hill named Gjønnesbakken. It was located on the small hill Gjønnesåsen northwest of the farm.

== Transport ==
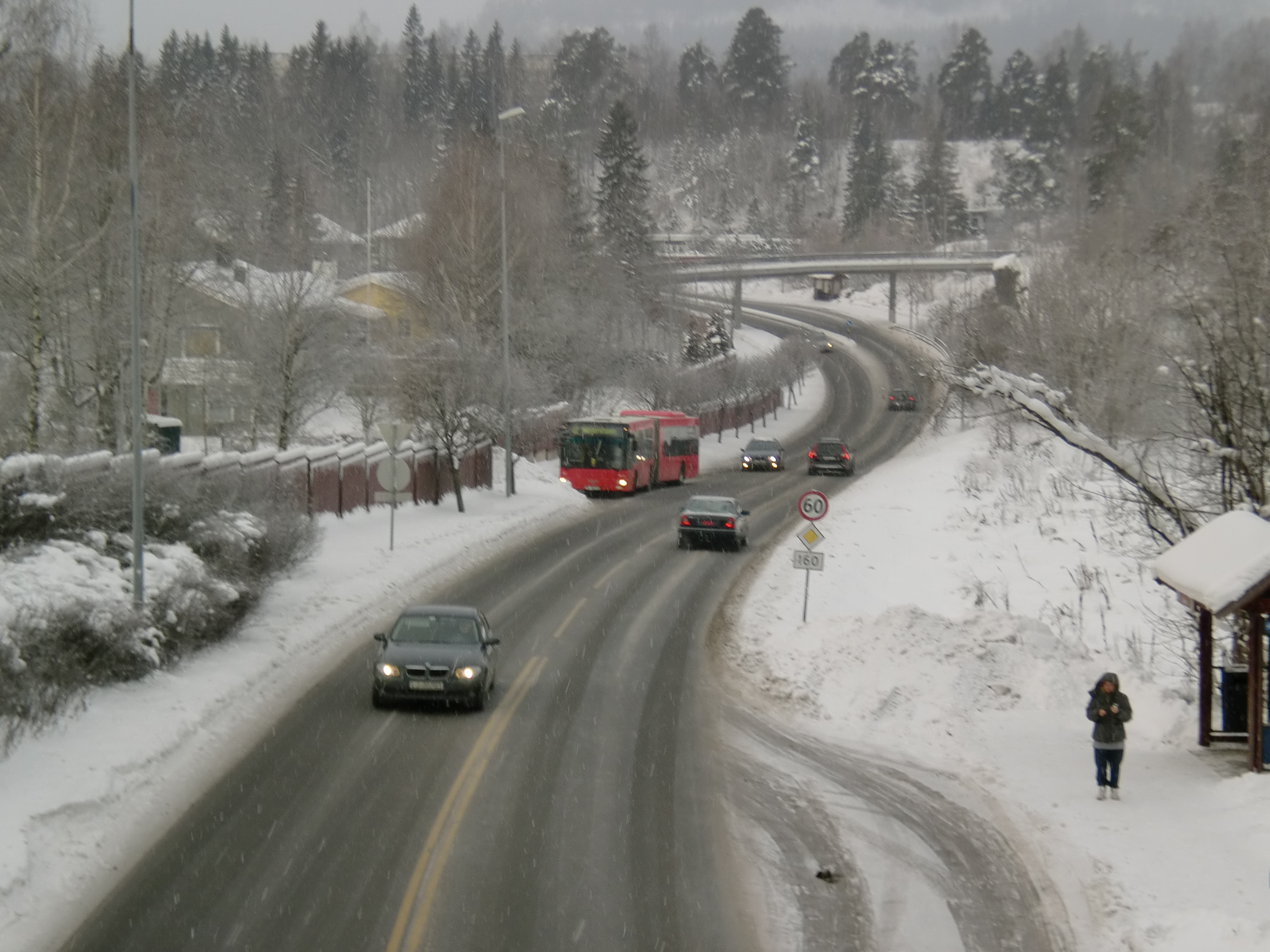
Bus 42 uses the National Road 160. Here at Gjønnes bus station.

Since 1924 Gjønnes is served by the Oslo Metro station Gjønnes. The district is also served by lines 42, 142, 732 and 735 of Ruter's bus network. Norwegian National Road 160 passes through the area, with the Bekkestua Tunnel having its western exit right by the Metro station.

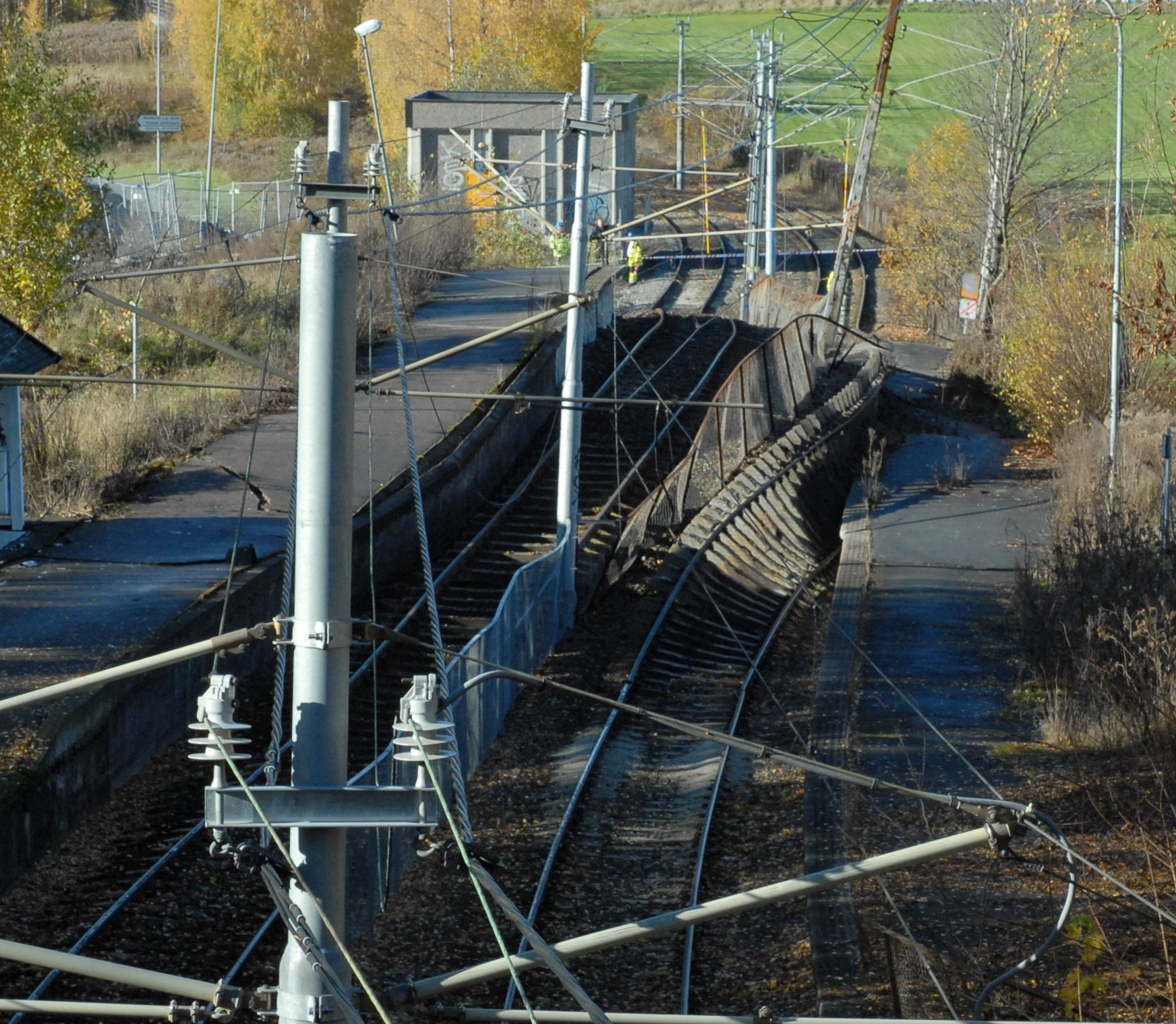
A ground accident at Gjønnes Station in October 2008.
