= Leo Behrens =

Norwegian filmmaker

- Born: Norway
- Education: American Film Institute Conservatory (MFA, Cinematography); Westerdals Oslo School of Arts, Communication and Technology (B.A., Film and Television Production)
- Occupations: Filmmaker, Cinematographer, Director
- Spouse: Ilayda Cetinkaya (2026-present)
- Mother: Vibeke Behrens
- Relatives: Samaya Behrens (aunt); Annette Behrens (aunt); Brita Behrens (grandmother); Lisa Adhiambo Kringstad (cousin)
- Website: https://www.leobehrens.art/

Leo Behrens is a Norwegian filmmaker based in Los Angeles, USA. He is known for his award-winning short film SKIN (2023) and recent work as a cinematographer and director on projects like XY (2025) and Pace (2024). He started his career in Norway as a camera operator and director after graduating from Westerdals Oslo's Film and Television Production program in 2010. Since then he has worked on various different projects from documentaries, music videos, TV shows, short films, to his first feature film, Shadow Watchers (2024). In 2023, he graduated from the MFA Cinematography program at the American Film Institute Conservatory. His cinematography style is highlighted for its poetic visual expression.

== Early life and education ==
=== Childhood ===
Leo Behrens was born on August 19, 1986 in Norway, to Vibeke Behrens, a business owner and entrepreneur. Growing up, Behrens engaged in a range of creative and imaginative activities including role-playing, visual arts, dancing, and music.

In 2003, he purchased his first camera and began learning how to shoot and edit his own short films.

On December 31, 2008, his mother, Vibeke Behrens, passed away suddenly.

=== Education ===
Prior to pursuing post-secondary education, Behrens joined the Norwegian military.

In 2008, he was accepted into Westerdals Oslo School of Arts. There, he studied Film and Television Production. Although his mother passed away at the end of his first semester at Westerdal Film & Television, he chose to continue. In the second year, before graduating in 2010, he worked on a short documentary with Emmeline Berglund titled Historien om deg og meg (2009) which won the Gullkalven award for Best Documentary (2009) and several other awards.

Following his graduation, he continued working and building up his experience in the film industry for several years, before being accepted into the American Film Institute Conservatory for a Masters of Fine Arts in Cinematography. He graduated from the program in 2023.

== Career ==
After graduating from Westerdals, Behrens started his work as a camera operator for various production companies including STRIX, Mastiff, Rubicon TV, Nordisk Film TV, and ITV Studios. He continued gaining experience and working as a director and cinematographer on music videos, documentaries, shorts, TV shows, and more.

His most notable project is the 35mm film SKIN (2023), for which he served as writer, director, and cinematographer. It is a short film visually and symbolically describing the act of discovering oneself. The film was originally created in response to a prompt as a second-year student at the AFI Conservatory, to tell a story visually through a 35mm film without dialogue. The short film stars actor Lio Mehiel and has been shown at AFI FEST, LACA Film Festival, Oldenburg International Film Festival, Inside Out Toronto Film Festival and overall more than 50 film festivals around the world. It has been nominated for and won various awards, most notably the Student Academy Award Gold Medal in the Alternative/Experimental category.

The Academy Motion Picture Art and Science provided him with guidance from American cinematographer and director, Michael Goi.

After graduating AFI, he was selected for the ASC Vision Mentorship Program through which he received the 2024 Fresh Perspectives in Cinematography Grant from ARRI and ASC. With this he was able to shoot his first feature film, Shadow Watchers (2024).

As of early 2025, Behrens is represented by Zero Gravity Management. He is also a member of the Norwegian Society of Cinematographers (Foreningen Norske Filmfotografer) along with the Society of Camera Operators (SOC).

One of Behrens' latest projects working as a cinematographer, The Last Draft (2025) directed by Nicholas Giulak, premiered and was nominated "Best Horror Short" at FilmQuest in the fall of 2025. Another film Behrens shot, Pace (2024), was selected to screen at Cannes Film Festival as a part of the American Pavillion Showcase.

=== Projects in development ===
Behrens' first feature film, Shadow Watchers (2024), is in post-production.

He is also working as a director of photography on the psychological-horror thriller, Oma, which is in pre-production and set to film in Austria.

=== Style and themes ===
Leo Behrens' cinematography is characterized by emotionally driven visual stylization, using sculpted light and atmospheric texture to reflect the characters psychology and inner state. These are seen throughout his work, notably in his alternative/experimental films, from his early short, Hjertets Sang (2008), to his Student Academy Award winner film, SKIN (2023), and his recent work on The Last Draft (2025).

Behrens explores poetic and emotional expression through visuals. He is described as working like a painter on visual productions. His work explores themes of personal identity, the connection between internal identity and outward expression, and transformation.

== Filmography ==
=== Director ===
- SKIN (2023) (Short)
- Lær Meg (2021) (Music Video)
- Redd (2020) (Music Video)
- Influenserne (2019) (7 episodes, TV series)
- I'll Be There (2018) (Music Video)
- Gift ved første blikk (2018) (10 episodes, TV series)
- Redningsskøyta (2012) (TV Series)
- Historien om deg og meg (2009) (Short)
- Hjertets Sang (2008) (Short)

=== Cinematographer ===
- Syringe (2026) (Short in post-production)
- The Last Draft (2025) (Short)
- XY (2025) (Short)
- Hunger Games: Sunrise on The Reaping - The Donner Sisters - Fan Fiction (2024) (Short)
- Pace (2024) (Short)
- Washed Up (2023) (Short)
- Possible Stranger (2023) (Music Video)
- SKIN (2023) (Short)
- Groomsperson (2023) (Short)
- Evan Ever After (2023) (Short)
- Tell Me Something True (2022) (Short)
- Next to Benevolence (2022) (Short)
- T4T (2022) (Short)
- Lær Mag (2021) (Music Video)
- Redd (2020) (Music Video)
- Klassen (2019-2020) (24 episodes, TV series)
- Ex on the Beach Norge (2020) (24 episodes, TV series)
- Torpet kjendis (2019-2020) (19 episodes, TV series)
- The Window (2019) (Short)
- Influenserne (2019) (15 episodes, TV series)
- Charterfeber - After Beach (2019) (6 episodes, TV series)
- Alle mot 1 (2019) (9 episodes, TV series)
- Torpet (2018) (1 episode, TV series)
- I'll Be There (2018) (Music Video)
- Gift ved første blikk (2018) (9 episodes, TV series)
- Sinnasnekker'n (2016-2018) (42 episodes, TV series)
- Født i feil kropp (2017) (4 episodes, TV series)
- Stomping Ground (2017) (Music Video)
- Sykt Perfekt (2016) (6 episodes, TV series)
- Norges Hagemester (2015) (TV series)
- Redningsskøyta (2012) (TV Series)
- Historien om deg og meg (2009) (Short)
- Luksusfellen (2013-2014) (22 episodes, TV series)

=== Writer ===
- SKIN (2023) (Short)
- Hjertets Sang (2008) (Short)

=== Producer ===
- SKIN (2023) (Short) (Executive Producer)
- Historien om deg og meg (2009) (Short)

=== Cast (self) ===
- Stage 5 (2025) (1 episode, TV series)
- Mensen (2020) (1 episode, TV mini series)
- Endelig Meg Selv (2018) (short)
- Født i feil kropp (2014) (1 episode, TV series)

== Awards and nominations ==
=== THE LAST DRAFT (2025) ===
- FilmQuest - Nominated

=== SKIN (2023) ===
- Student Academy Award Gold Medal in Alternative/Experimental (2023) - Winner
- Los Angeles Cinematography Awards: Best Short, Best Picture of the Month, Best Cinematography, Best Screenplay, Best Producer, Best Production Design, Best Editing (2023) - Winner
- GemFest Awards: Best Cinematography (Short), Best Editing (Short) (2024) - Winner
- TINFF Award for Best Short (2024) - Winner
- AFI FEST Grand Jury Award (2023) - Nominated

=== Evan Ever After (2023) ===
- Florida Film Festival Audience Award for Best Florida Short (2023) - Winner
- Out on Film Film Festival: Jury Award for Best Documentary Short, Audience Award for Best Documentary Short (2023) - Winner
- Stamped Film Festival Jury Award for Best Documentary Short (2023) - Winner

=== Groomsperson (2023) ===
- Los Angeles Cinematography Award for Best Drama (2023) - Winner

=== Født i feil kropp (2014, 2017) ===
- Gullruten (Golden Screen) Norway Best Documentary (2015) - Winner
- Gullruten (Golden Screen) Norway Best Participant Award (2017) - Nominated

=== Historien om deg og meg (2009) ===
- Gullkalven award for Best Documentary (2009) - Winner
- Skeive Filmer Blikk's Audience Award for Best Short Film (2009) - Winner
- Oslo Fusion Film Festival Norway Audience Award (2009) - Winner
- The Norwegian Documentary Festival Award for Best Documentary (2009) - Nominated
