= Bekkestua Tunnel =

Road tunnel in Norway

Coordinates: 59.9167°N 10.5856°E

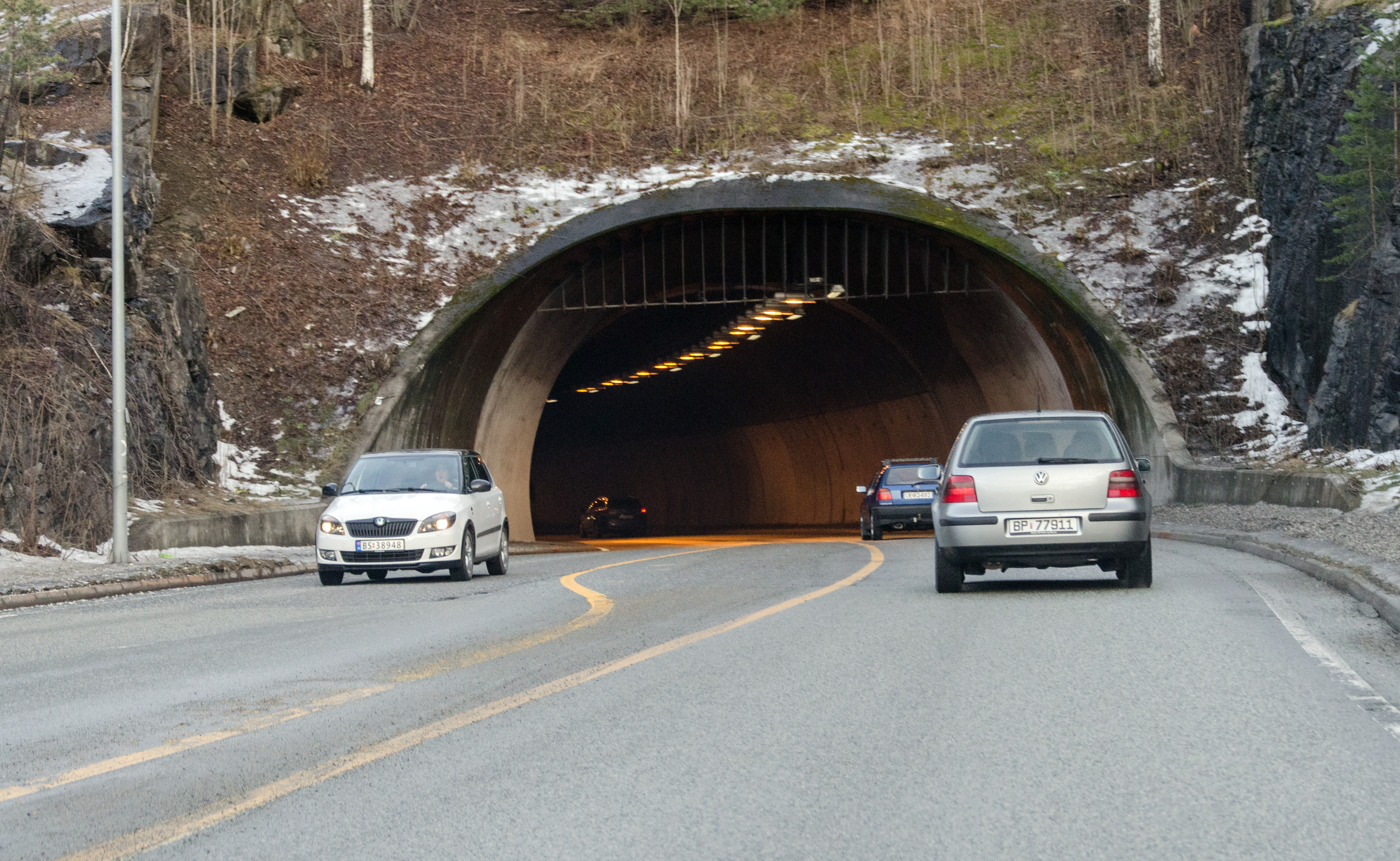
Bekkestuatunnelen.jpg

The Bekkestua Tunnel (Norwegian: Bekkestuatunnelen) is a road tunnel which runs under Bekkestua in Bærum, Norway. Forming a part of the Norwegian National Road 160, it starts northeast of Bekkestua to ease this population and commercial centre of heavy traffic, and emerges in the southwest near Gjønnes Station. It was opened in 1994, and was financed by the Oslo Package 1.
