= Treider College =

Former college in Oslo, Norway

Coordinates: 59°54′40.37″N 10°44′18.42″E

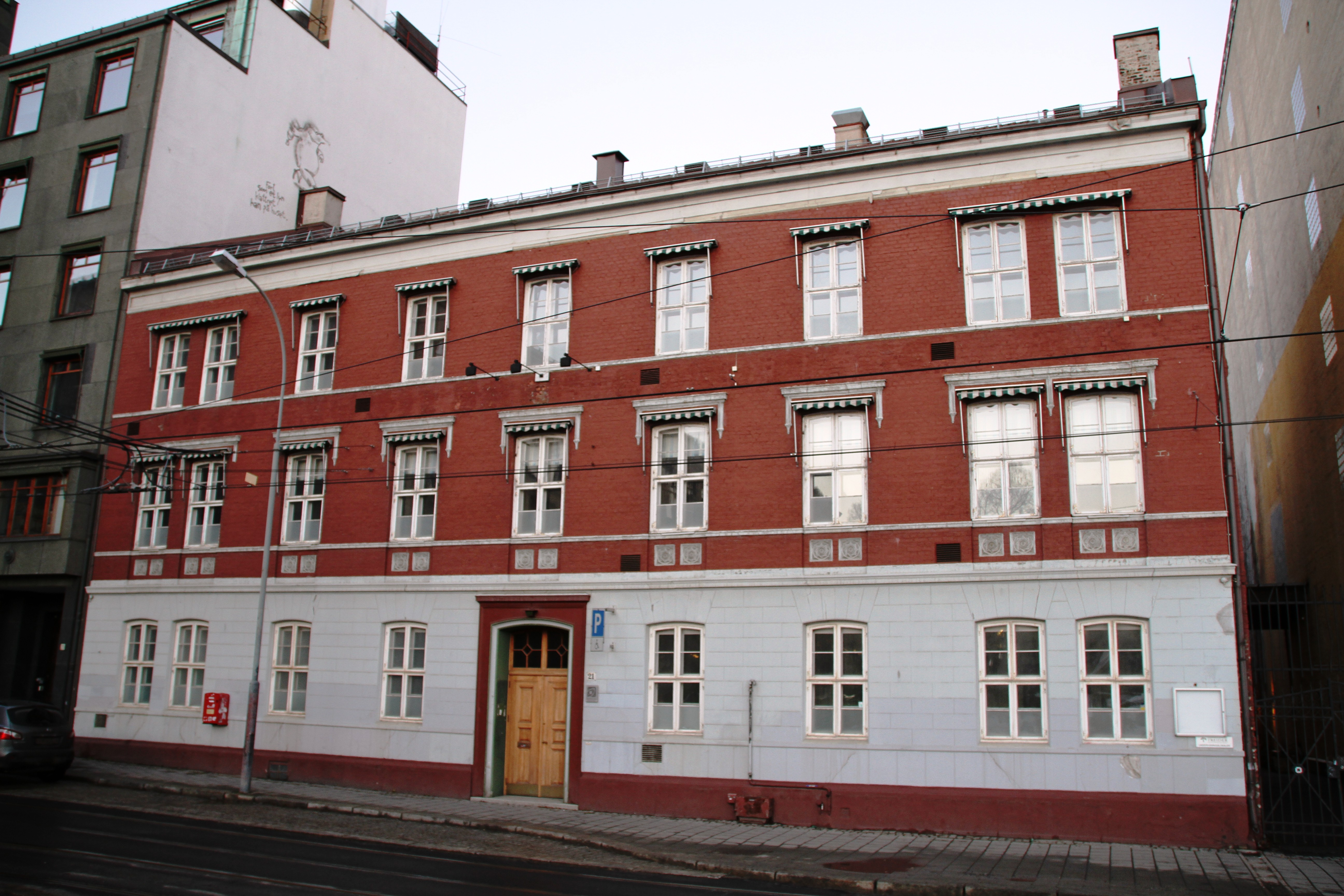
Original premises of Treider College at Kristian Augusts Gate 21 in Oslo

Treider College (Norwegian: Treider Fagskoler; formerly Otto Treiders Handelsskole, transl. Otto Treider Business School and Treider Privatskole, transl. Treider Private School) was a nationwide professional school in Norway that had programs in areas such as tourism, administration, and sales management.

The school was founded by the Free Church proponent Otto Treider in 1882 at Kristian Augusts gate 21. Treider College had premises at Nedre Vollgate 8 in Oslo and regional offices in Bergen and Trondheim.

The company Treider Fagskoler AS, which operated the school, was owned by the investment company Anthon B Nilsen AS, a Scandinavian private company involved in education. In 2020, Treider merged with NKI Nettstudier, also owned by Anthon B Nilsen AS.
