= Nith =

Nith may refer to:

- River Nith (Scotland)
- Nith River (Canada)
- Nīþ a term for a social stigma implying the loss of honour and the status of a villain.
- Nithing pole
- National Institute of Technology, Hamirpur
- Norwegian School of Information Technology
