= Haslum station =

Oslo metro station

Haslum
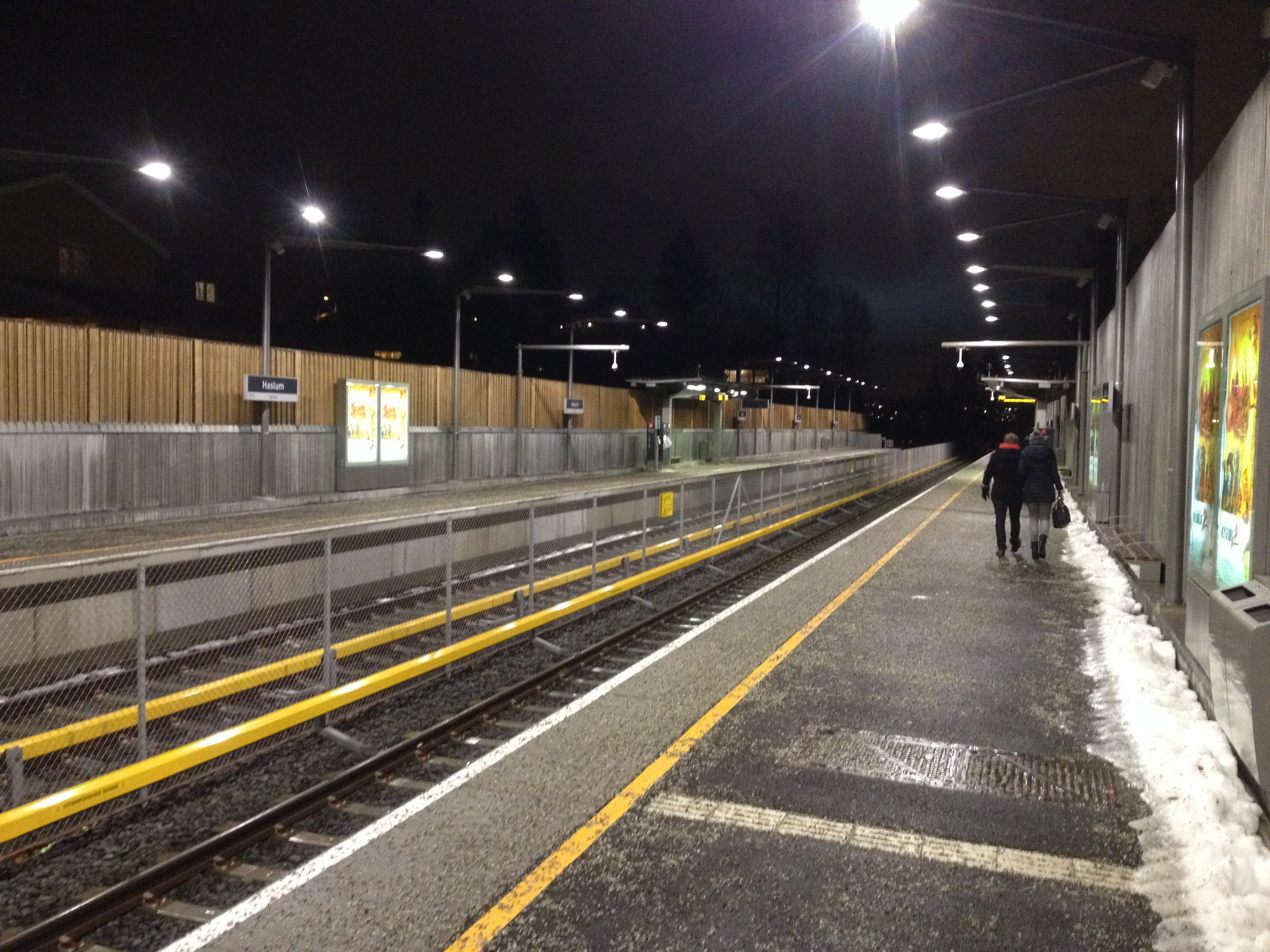
- Haslum station from the eastbound platform, 7 days after the official reopening.

General information
- Location: Haslum, Bærum; Norway
- Coordinates: 59°54′54″N 10°33′39″E
- Elevation: 68.5 m (225 ft)
- Owner: Sporveien
- Operator: Sporveien T-banen
- Line: Kolsås Line
- Distance: 13.0 km (8.1 mi) from Stortinget
- Tracks: 2

Construction
- Structure type: Elevated
- Cycle facilities: Yes
- Accessible: Yes

Other information
- Fare zone: 1

History
- Opened: 1 June 1924; 102 years ago 15 December 2013; 12 years ago (reopening)
- Closed: 1 July 2006; 20 years ago (temporarily closed)
- Rebuilt: 15 December 2013; 12 years ago

Services
Preceding station	Oslo Metro	Following station
Avløs towards Kolsås	Line 3 Kolsås Line	Gjønnes towards Mortensrud
Location

Haslum is a station on the Kolsås Line on the Oslo Metro. It is between Avløs and Gjønnes, 13.0 kilometers (8.1 mi) from Stortinget. It serves the neighborhood Haslum.

The station was opened 1 July 1924 as part of the tramway Lilleaker Line.

Along with most of the line, Haslum closed for upgrades on 1 July 2006 and its service was temporarily provided by bus. Haslum among other things, received longer platforms which can accommodate trains with up to six cars like most of the subway system. It reopened on 15 December 2013.
