= Otto Treider =

Norwegian educator and preacher

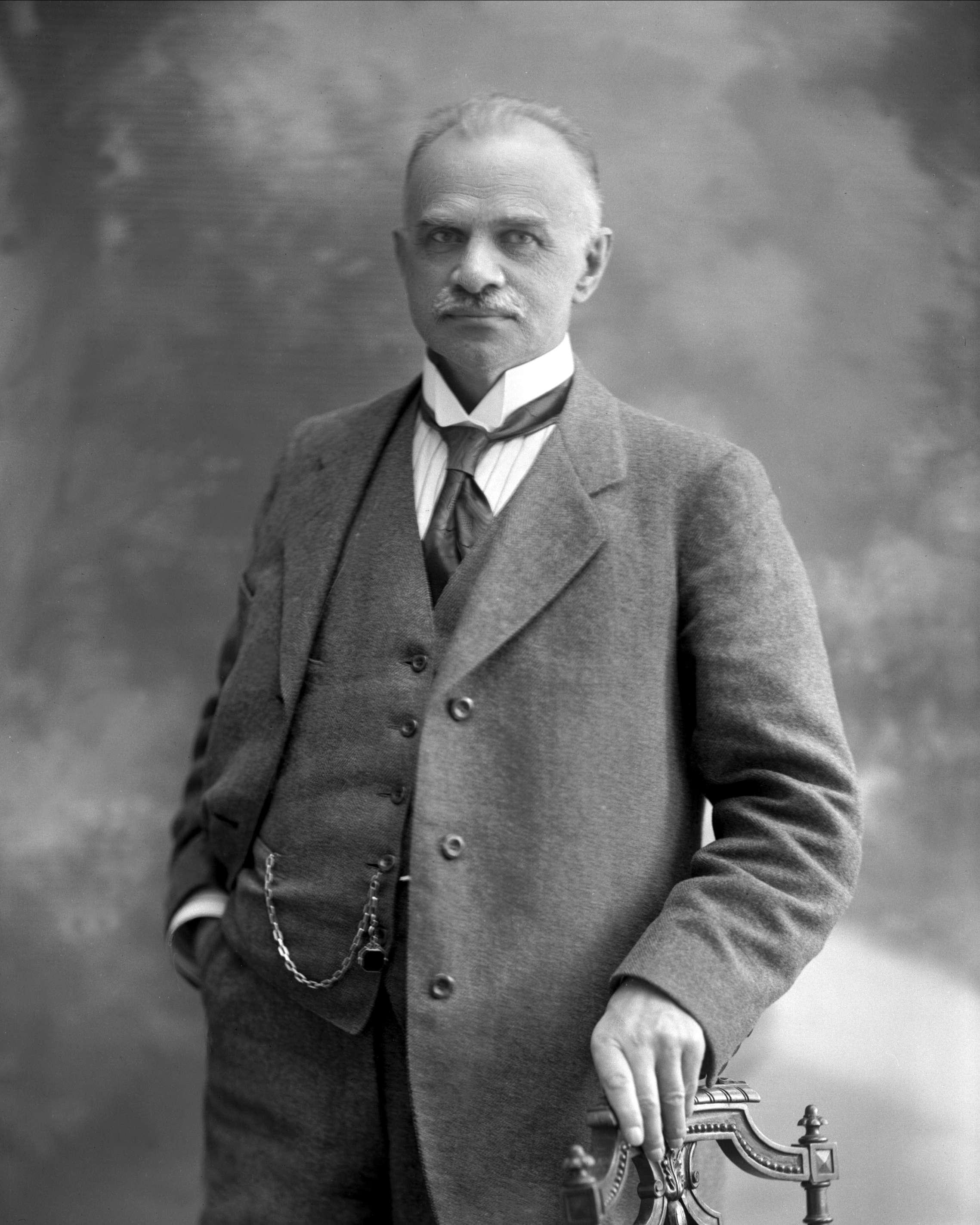
Otto Treider in 1916

Otto Halfdan Treider (October 6, 1856 – April 6, 1928) was a Norwegian educator and preacher.

Treider was born in Drøbak. He founded the Otto Treider Business School (Otto Treiders handelsskole, now Treider College) in 1882. The institution soon became Norway's largest and leading business school.

As a preacher, Treider supported the Free Church movement and led a group known as the Treider Circle. In 1891 he built the Calmeyer Street Mission House in Oslo.

Treider died in Oslo.
