= Anthon B Nilsen =

Norwegian investment company

Anthon B Nilsen AS
- Genre: Investment
- Founded: 1879
- Founder: Anthon B. Nilsen
- Headquarters: Oslo, Norway
- Key people: Peder Chr. Løvenskiold (CEO); Karl Nysterud (Board chairman)
- Owner: Reidar and Gunnar Holst Foundation (50%); Nicolai H. Løvenskiold (25%); Peder Chr. Løvenskiold (25%)
- Number of employees: 728 (2018)
- Divisions: ABN Recycling; ABN Education; ABN Property; ABN Trade
- Website: www.abn.no

Anthon B Nilsen AS is a Norwegian investment company. It was established by Anthon Bernhard Elias Nilsen in 1879 to export pulp and paper products and lumber. His sons Reidar and Gunnar Holst took over in the 1930s, and ultimately established the Reidar and Gunnar Holst Foundation in 1973 to assure long-term ownership. In 2000, Nicolai H. Løvenskiold and Peder Chr. Løvenskiold bought 25% of the shares each.

== Company operations ==
As of 2008 the company has invested in education, property, recycling and trade, with one subdivision for each field. Through its subdivision ABN Education (Anthon B Nilsen Utdanning) it owns several private high school and college institutions in Norway, including the Norwegian School of Information Technology, NKI Fjernundervisning, the Nordic Institute of Stage and Studio, Westerdals School of Communication, Treider College and Bjørknes College. It owns two colleges in a foreign country; Berghs School of Communication and Medlearn in Sweden.

In 2014, Westerdals Oslo School of Arts, Communication and Technology was established as a result of the merger of the three colleges Westerdals School of Communication, NISS (Nordic Institute of Stage and Studio) and NITH (The Norwegian School of Information Technology).

The recycling division ABN Recycling (Anthon B Nilsen S.A.S.) has its main office in Paris, and has regional offices in Tofte, Boninne, London and Alzira, Valencia.

== Negotiations ==
In August 2007, ABN Property (Anthon B Nilsen Eiendom), came in the spotlight as the company CG Holding tried to buy the paper mill in Hurum, whose land and facilities were owned by ABN Property. The paper mill had previously been threatened with closure. Two weeks later, CG Holding penned a deal to buy the factory. The only remaining step was to negotiate the land rental with ABN Property. One week later, however, ABN had proposed an altered deal for land rental. CG Holding accused the new contract of being unreasonable. In the end, CG Holding did take over the factory, but decided to cease production the next year. With no particular plans for the production facilities, ABN announced that the factory would lie fallow for the time being.
