= Calmeyer Street Mission House =

Building in Oslo, Norway

Coordinates: 59°54′56.120″N 10°45′11.603″E

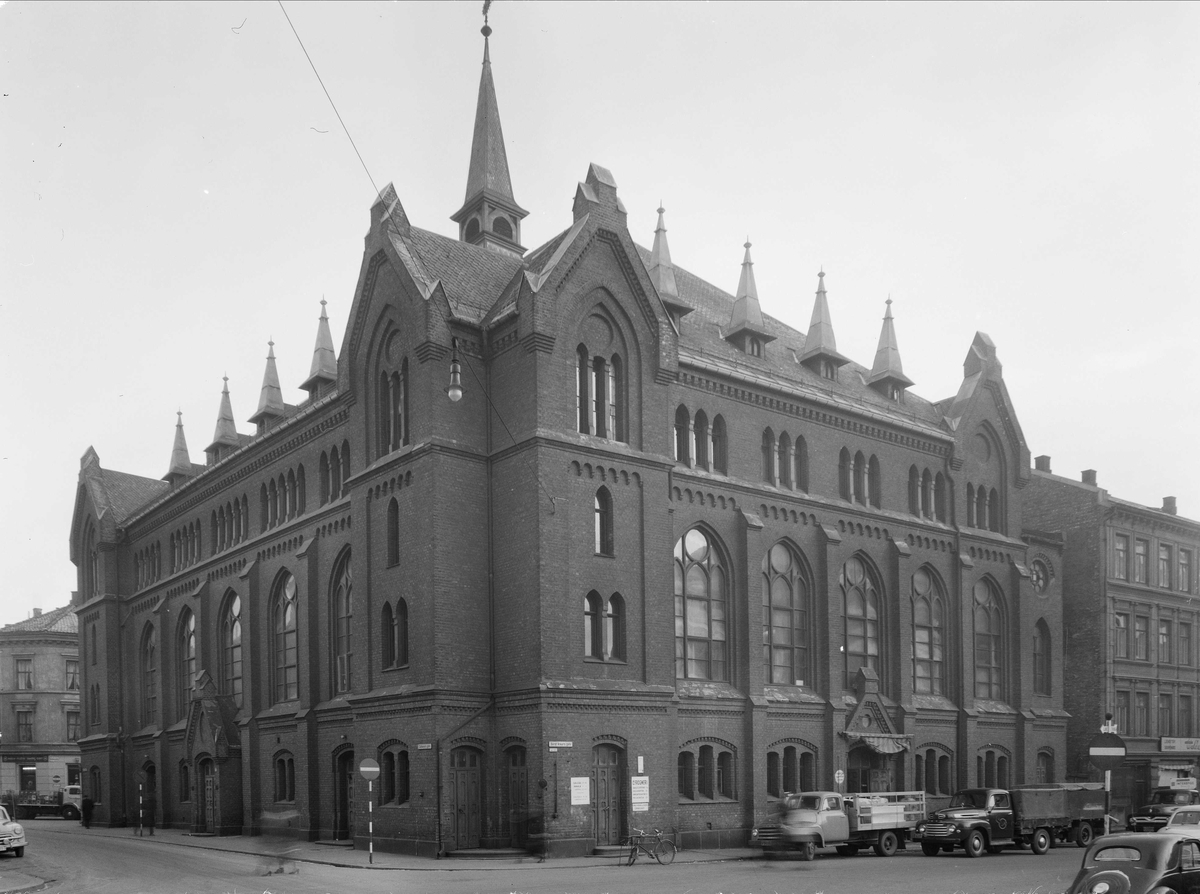
Calmeyer Street Mission House in 1957

The Calmeyer Street Mission House (Norwegian: Calmeyergatens Misjonshus) was a building located at Calmeyers gate no. 1 in Oslo, Norway. The building served as a religious assembly house for Lutheran gatherings in the Oslo neighborhood around Hausmanns gate (Hausmann Street).

== History ==
Calmeyer Street Mission House was a Gothic Revival structure designed by the architect Henrik Nissen. Educator and businessman Otto Treider was largely responsible for the mission house being built in 1891. At the time, it contained Scandinavia's largest assembly hall, capable of accommodating over 5,000 people.

Kristiania Home Mission Society (Norwegian: Kristiania Indremisjon) took over the building in 1898. This provided a venue for a series of large gatherings, including full-scale revivals in 1905 and 1906 that filled the building night after night. Prime Minister Christian Michelsen also delivered a speech there in 1905. The building was also the location of the Calmeyer Street Meeting (Calmeyergatemøtet) from February 15th to 18th, 1920 during debates between liberal and orthodox theologians within the Church of Norway.

During the German occupation (1940–45), the building was requisitioned by the German military. Until the 1950s, the building was frequently used for concerts and as a warehouse until it was razed in 1972. The lot was used as a parking lot, among other purposes, until the Church City Mission (Kirkens Bymisjon) built an office building with rental housing there. After the new building was completed in 1987, the office space was leased to Norwegian Board of Health Supervision (Statens helsetilsyn).

== See also ==
- Jens Frølich Tandberg
- Ole Hallesby

== Related reading ==
- Bernt T. Oftestad; Tarald Rasmussen; Jan Scumacher (2001) Norsk kirkehistorie (Universitetsforlaget, Oslo) ISBN 82-00-21808-2
