= Nordic Institute of Stage and Studio =

Coordinates: 59°54′51″N 10°45′28″E

Nordic Institute of Stage and Studio (NISS)
- Nordisk Institutt for Scene og Studio
- Motto: Education for stage and studio, film and art
- Type: Private college
- Established: 1984
- Rector: Jørgen H. V. Gjerdrum (2007-)
- Students: 600 (2007)
- Location: Oslo, Norway
- Campus: Urban
- Website: www.niss.no

The Nordic Institute of Stage and Studio (Norwegian: Nordisk Institutt for Scene og Studio) is a private college located in Oslo, Norway. It focuses on subjects related to stage, studio, film and television, and is one of the largest educational centers in the Nordic countries with this specific theme.

It was founded as Norsk Lydskole (Norwegian School of Sound) in 1985, the school has since expanded to include several courses related to performing arts. The course Popular Music has an option of entering year three of a bachelor's degree at the University of Wolverhampton, studying BA Popular Music or BA Music Technology & Popular Music.

Since 2007, it has been owned by the investment company Anthon B Nilsen.

In 2014, Westerdals Oslo School of Arts, Communication and Technology was established as a result of the merger of the three colleges Westerdals School of Communication, NISS (Nordic Institute of Stage and Studio) and NITH (The Norwegian School of Information Technology).
