= Anthon B. Nilsen =

Norwegian businessman and politician

Anthon Bernhard Elias Nilsen
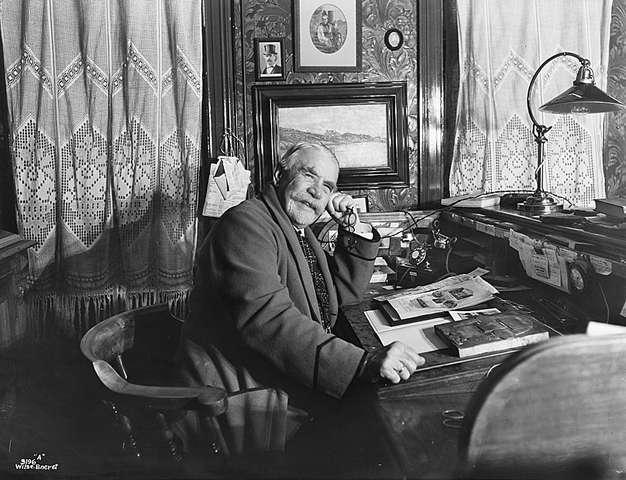
- Anthon B. Nilsen in 1930.

Member of the Norwegian Parliament for Fredrikstad
- In office 1895–1897

Personal details
- Born: 1855 Svelvik, Norway
- Died: 1936 (aged 80–81)
- Party: Conservative
- Occupation: Businessman; Novelist

Anthon Bernhard Elias Nilsen (30 June 1855 – 6 December 1936) was a Norwegian businessman and politician for the Conservative Party. He also wrote novels, under the pseudonym Elias Kræmmer.

He was born in Svelvik. A small town, Svelvik nonetheless played an important role, being the nearest port of the larger town Drammen when the Drammensfjord inlet was frozen over during the winter. Nilsen later moved to Drammen, and in 1879 he established a company to export pulp and paper products as well as lumber. The company, named Anth. B. Nilsen & Co from 1912, was taken over by his sons in the 1930s. It still exists today, under the name Anthon B Nilsen AS. Mainly emphasizing investment, it owns several Norwegian colleges.

Anthon Nilsen also lived in Fredrikstad for many years. He came to the city in 1877 to work as manager of Fredrikstad Dampsag (Fredrikstad sawmill), but also co-founded the newspaper Fredriksstad Blad, which still exists today. Nilsen was elected from Fredrikstad to the Norwegian Parliament in 1895, but served only one term. He was also active in local politics. He left Fredrikstad in 1901, and later lived at Larkollen and Jeløya.

Under the pseudonym Elias Kræmmer, Nilsen had a sizeable literary production. His debut came in 1894 with Glade Borgere, a collection of small town depictions. He was not acknowledged for high literary quality, but nonetheless became popular for his humour. Later books include the novels Sigurd Seiersborg (1920), Fyrgangen (1923), Bølgerne ruller (1925), Asylet (1928), Evensen (1930), Elias Kræmmers oplevelser (1932), Glade ungdom (1933) and Paa livets høislette (1934). One of his plays, written in 1912, was staged at the National Theatre. Nilsen also published a collection of poetry in 1919 under his real name.

A bust of Nilsen was raised in Svelvik in 1955. A street in Fredrikstad has been named after Elias Kræmmer.
