= Anne Gravingen and Bendik Romstad =

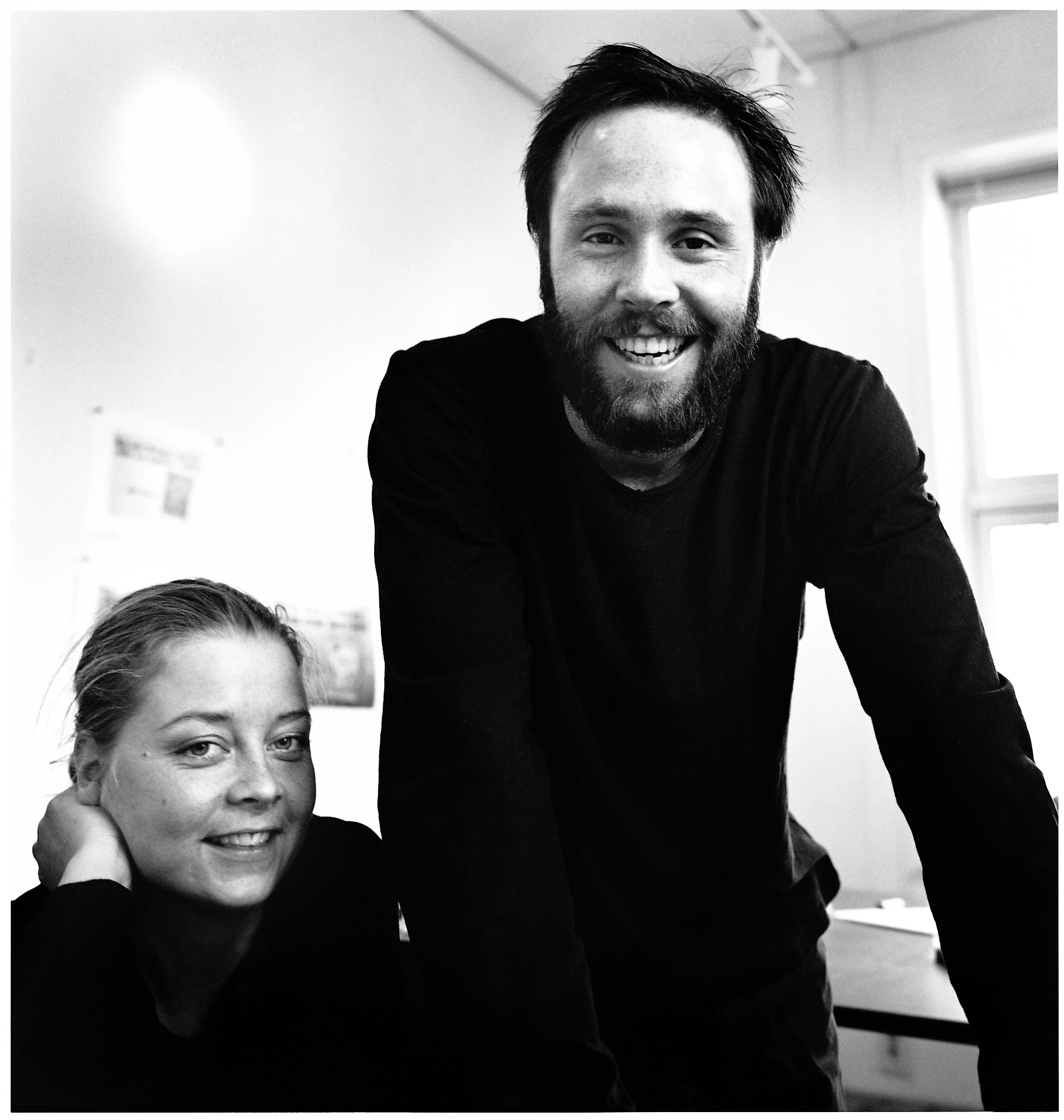
Anne Gravingen and Bendik Romstad

Anne Gravingen and Bendik Romstad (born 25 October 1970 and 5 November 1969) are a married couple who are both former advertising agents, now food entrepreneurs, who have worked together continuously since they studied together at Westerdals School of Communication in 1994. They were named by Aftenposten in 2005 as Norway's most creative couple.

== Advertising ==
Gravingen is an art director, and Romstad is a copy writer. After working for Bates, Leo Burnett, and New Deal, in 2002 they started the Kitchen advertising agency. In 2005, they received the Norwegian advertising industry's honorary award – Gullblyanten. With 11 golds, they were the most successful agency in Gullblyanten in 2006. They sold their advertising agency in 2007 to the international agency Leo Burnett Worldwide. In 2008, the couple were the most award-winning creative team in Norwegian advertising. Both of them have been selected for the Cannes Lions International Festival of Creativity Jury.

Clients have included the Vossafår brand of sausages, for which they created the first television campaign in 1997, Scandinavian Airlines, Freia, OBOS, Norway Post, Statkraft, and the Fretex resale unit of the Norwegian Salvation Army.

In 2012, Romstad started Energy Pool, a program for young advertising talents. An advertisement made for The Norwegian Directorate for Children, Youth and Family Affairs was 2020's most popular TV commercial in Norway, winning the Gullfisken award, and receiving over 600 million views. They left the advertising industry in 2020, and started working full time on their side-project, Anne på landet.

== Anne på landet ==
In 2014, Gravingen and Romstad founded Anne på landet as a side-project, after selling their first cafe/country store called Svartskog Kolonial. In 2015, Anne på landet become one of Oslo's three first approved food trucks, offering homemade and self-harvested food. The same year, they established a café with the same name at the beach of Hvervenbukta in southern Oslo. In 2018, they took over Frognerparken Café located in the middle of Frogner Park, 100 years after a restaurant first opened in the same building. In 2019, they took over the café Hønse-Lovisas hus at Sagene. Contrary to many other restaurants, the company increased during the COVID-19 pandemic from 17 million kroners in revenue in 2019, to 20 million in 2020.

== Private life ==
The couple, who met when they were both students at Westerdals, maintain a strict separation of work and home conversation. They have a getaway at an 1890 estate in Svartskog called Odden, which they have filled with antiques. They have two children.
