= NKI Nettstudier =

Norwegian correspondence school

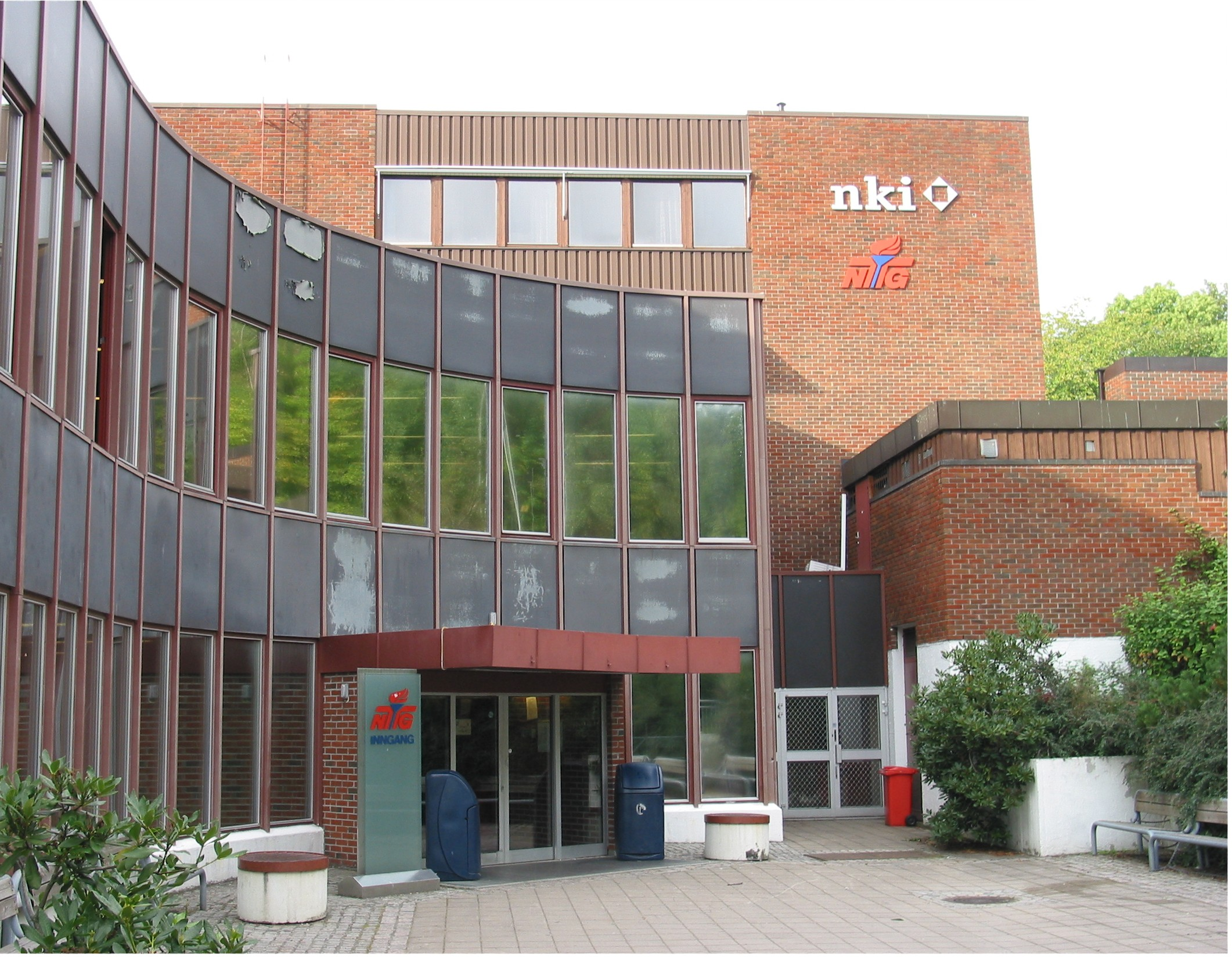
NKI, co-located with the Norwegian College of Elite Sport.

NKI Nettstudier (formerly NKI Fjernundervisning) is a Norwegian correspondence school, established in 1959. The school was formerly a part of NKI Norsk Kunnskaps-Institutt AS, but since 2007, is part of the company Anthon B Nilsen. The school is located at Nadderud in Bærum.

NKI offers postal and Internet studies in courses from upper secondary school, post-graduate studies and university college studies.
