= Westerdals Oslo School of Arts, Communication and Technology =

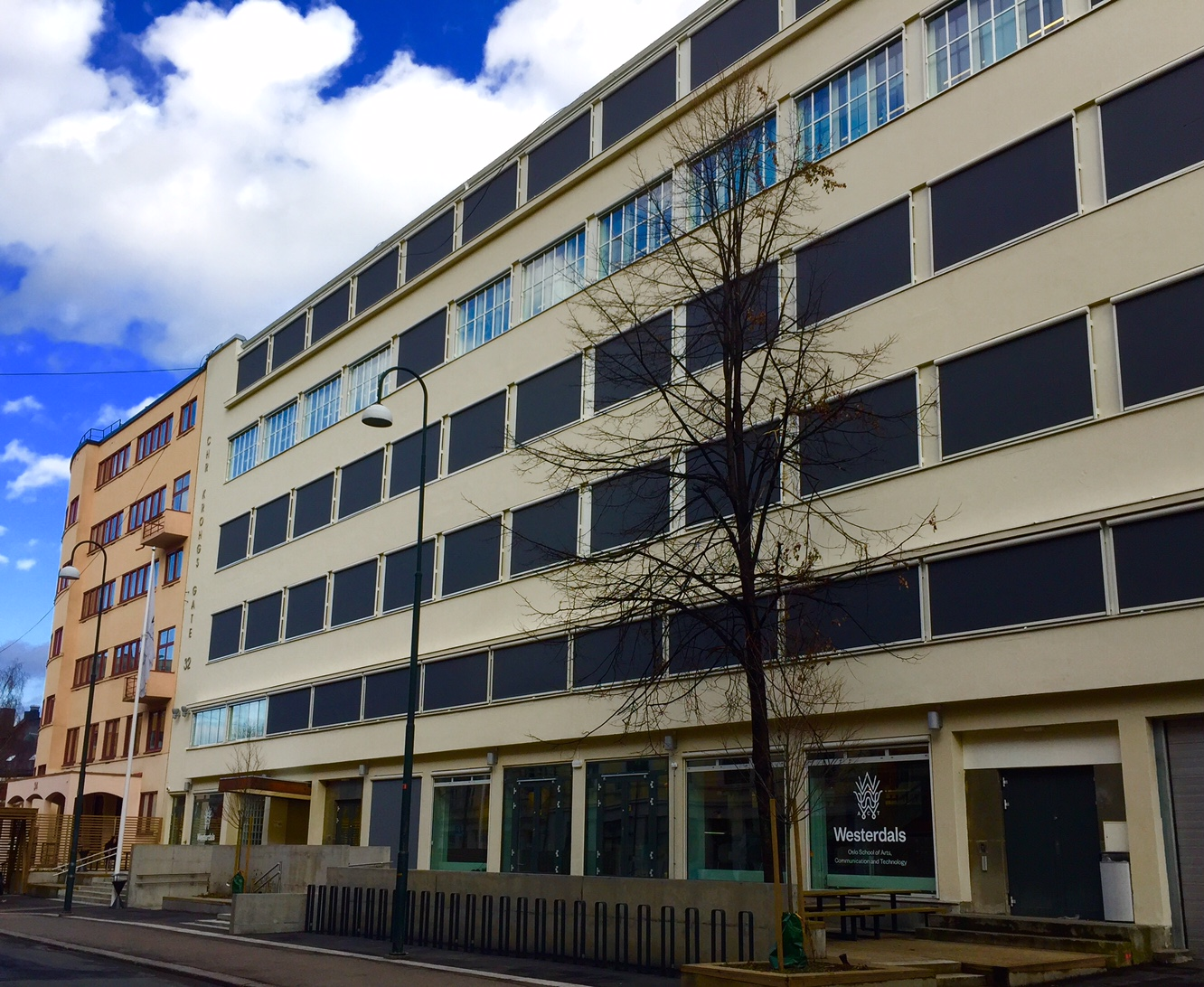
- Oslo; Norway

Information
- Established: 2014
- Rector: Bjørn Jarle Hanssen
- Enrollment: 1600
- Website: www.westerdals.no

Westerdals Oslo School of Arts, Communication and Technology was established in July 2014 as a result of the merger of the three colleges Westerdals School of Communication, NISS (Nordic Institute of Stage and Studio) and NITH (The Norwegian School of Information Technology).

Westerdals Oslo ACT offers an interdisciplinary learning environment, where students have an opportunity to collaborate widely across various fields, and the school, owned by the company Anthon B Nilsen, is part of the Erasmus+ student exchange programme.
