= Westerdals School of Communication =

Location
- Oslo; Norway
- Coordinates: 59°55′25″N 10°45′10″E

Information
- Type: Private school
- Established: 2001; 25 years ago
- Rector: Tom Kvisle
- Enrollment: 380
- Website: www.westerdals.no

Westerdals School of Communication (WSoC) is a private school in Oslo that offers an education in advertising, design and communications. It was established in 2001 following the merger of three independent schools: Westerdals Advertising School, School for Graphic Design and Wolff Advertising and Decoration School.

Each school has retained its character under new names, while students shared the teaching of theoretical communication. From 2004, the school offered an education in film and television. As of 2011, Westerdals offers bachelor's degrees in Text & Copywriter, Art Direction, Film & Television, Graphic Design, Visual Merchandising & Commercial Interior Design and Event & Experience Design.

Students work with project-based strategic communication: how ideas are developed, processed and communicated in different channels in the workplace.

In 2010, Westerdals was ranked one of the world's ten best communication schools in “YoungGuns Schools of the Decade”.

In 2011, Westerdals was established as a college, and is thus one of the few colleges in the Nordic region to offer bachelor's degrees within a variety of creative communication disciplines.

In 2014, Westerdals Oslo School of Arts, Communication and Technology was established as a result of the merger of the three colleges Westerdals School of Communication, NISS (Nordic Institute of Stage and Studio) and NITH (The Norwegian School of Information Technology).

== Alumni ==
- Anne Gravingen and Bendik Romstad (1994)
