= Haslum =

Coordinates: 59°55′19″N 10°34′17″E

- Village
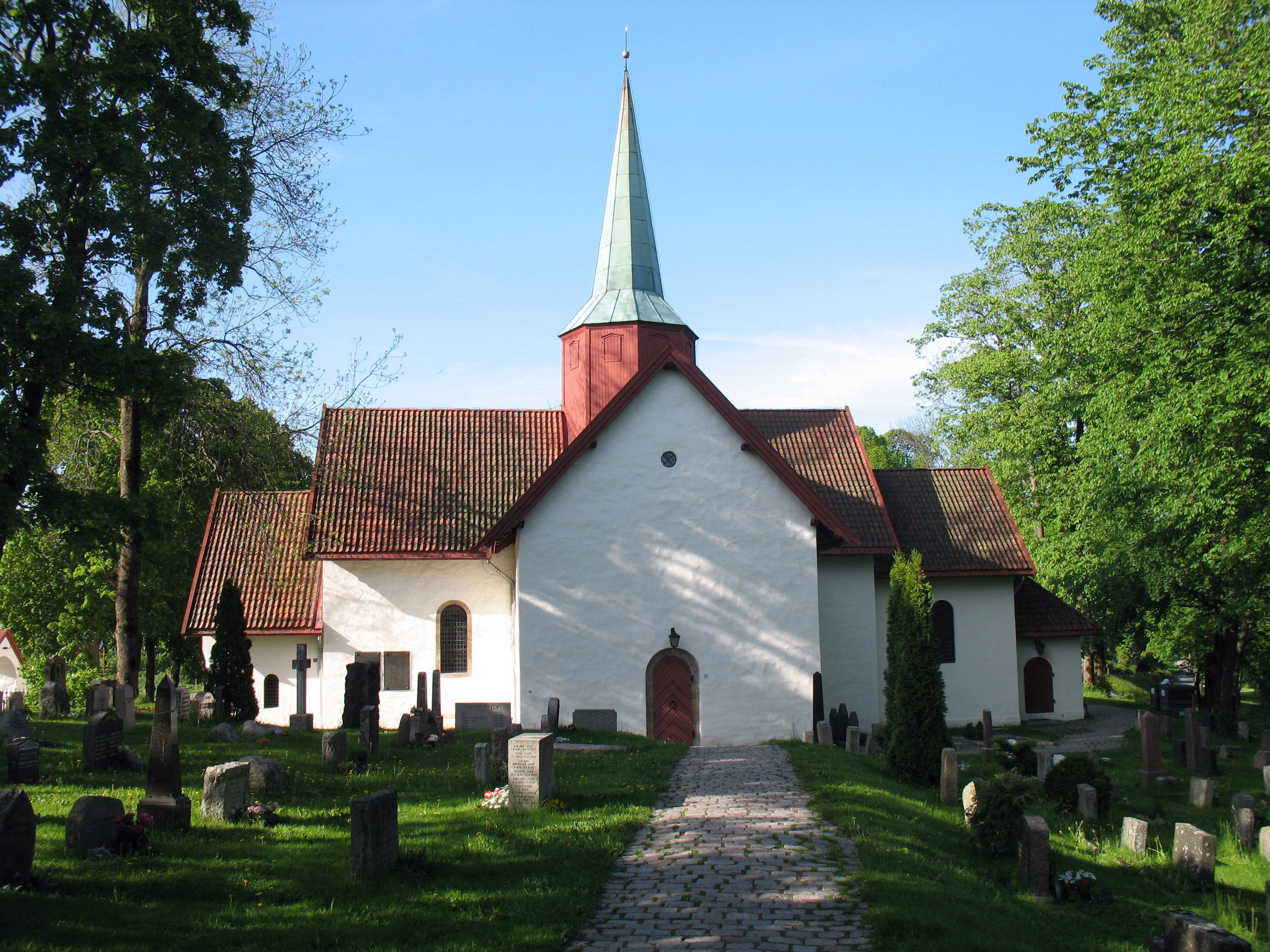
- Haslum Church

- Location in Akershus
- Country: Norway
- Region: Østlandet
- County: Akershus
- Time zone: UTC+01:00 (CET)
  - Summer (DST): UTC+02:00 (CEST)

Haslum is a district in the municipality of Bærum, Norway. Its population (2007) is 6,041. Haslum is served by Haslum station on the Kolsås Line (Kolsåsbanen) of Oslo Metro. It is situated between Avløs and Gjønnes. Haslum is noted for Haslum Church (Haslum kirke) its medieval parish church, which is surrounded by a historic cemetery.

The handball club Haslum Topphåndballforening plays in the top division on both the men's and women's side.

== Haslum Church Gallery ==
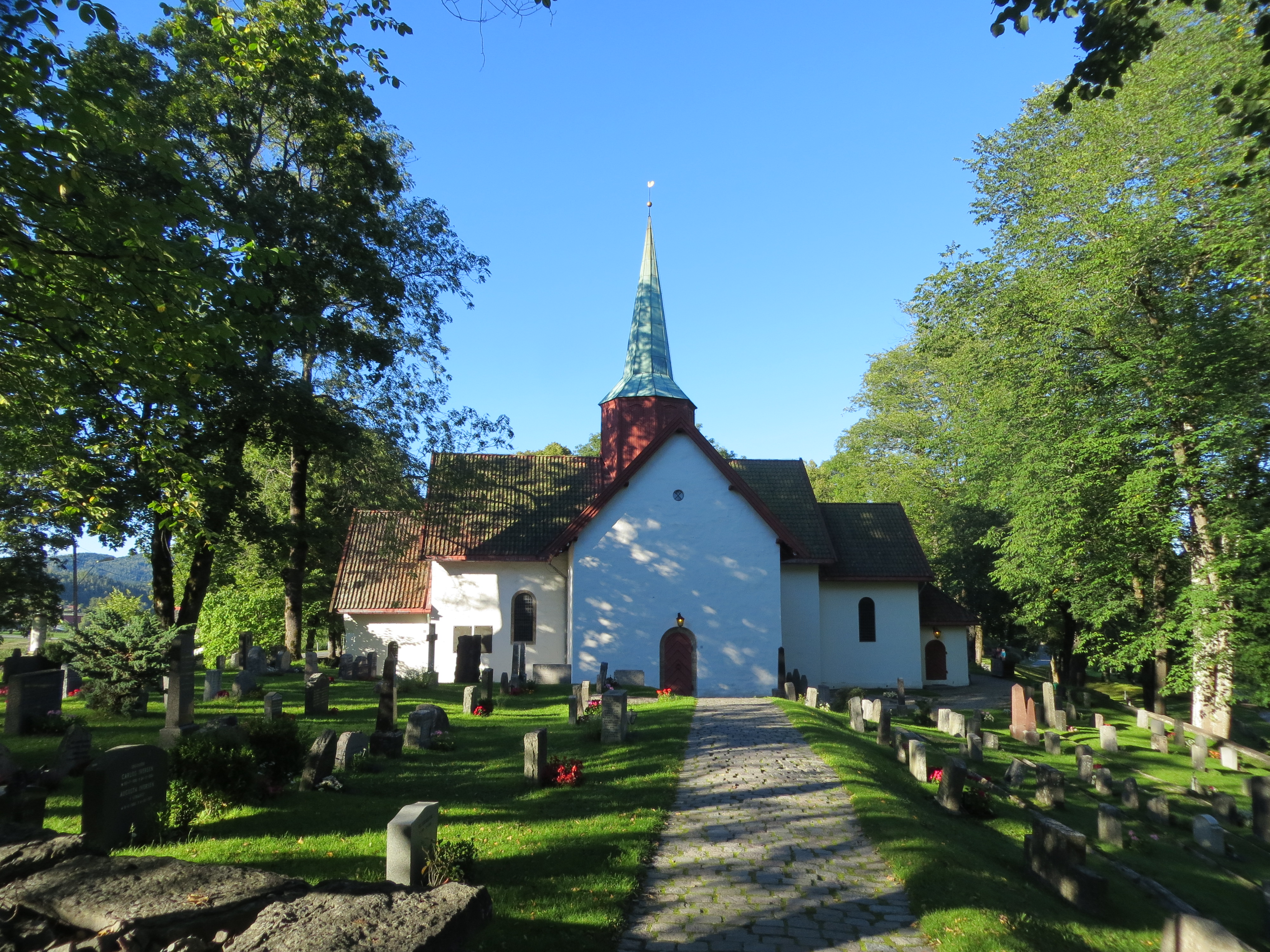

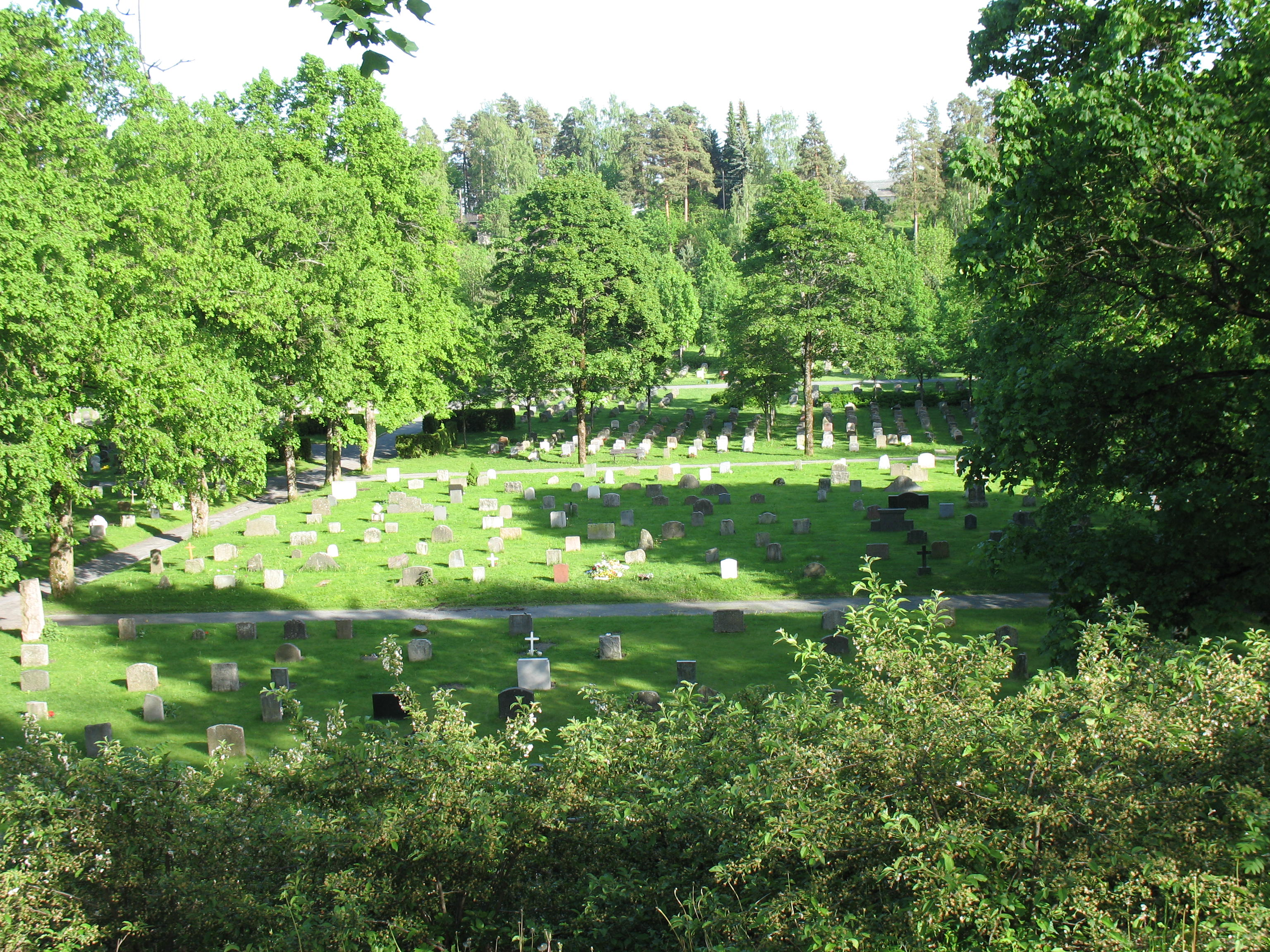

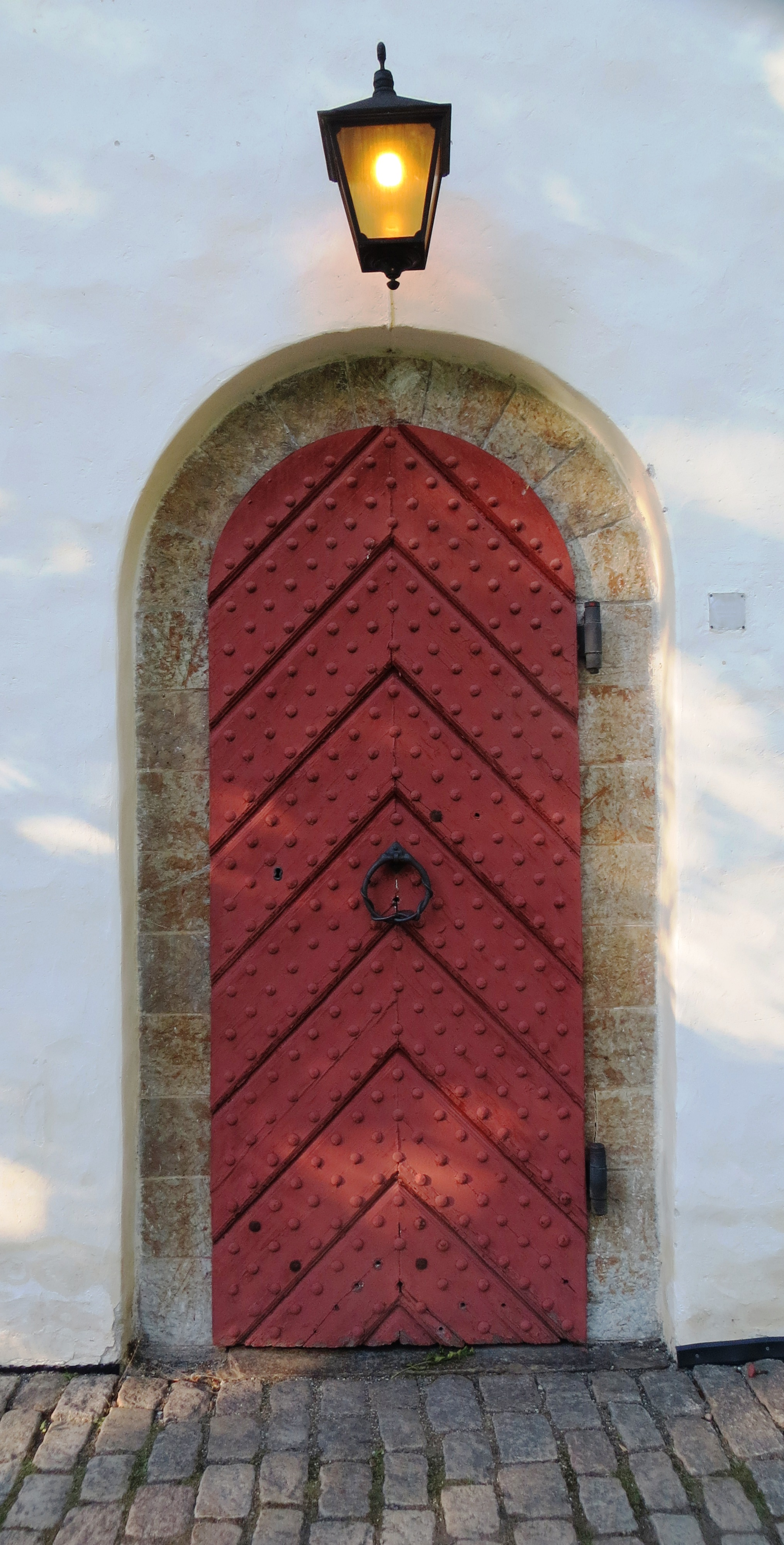

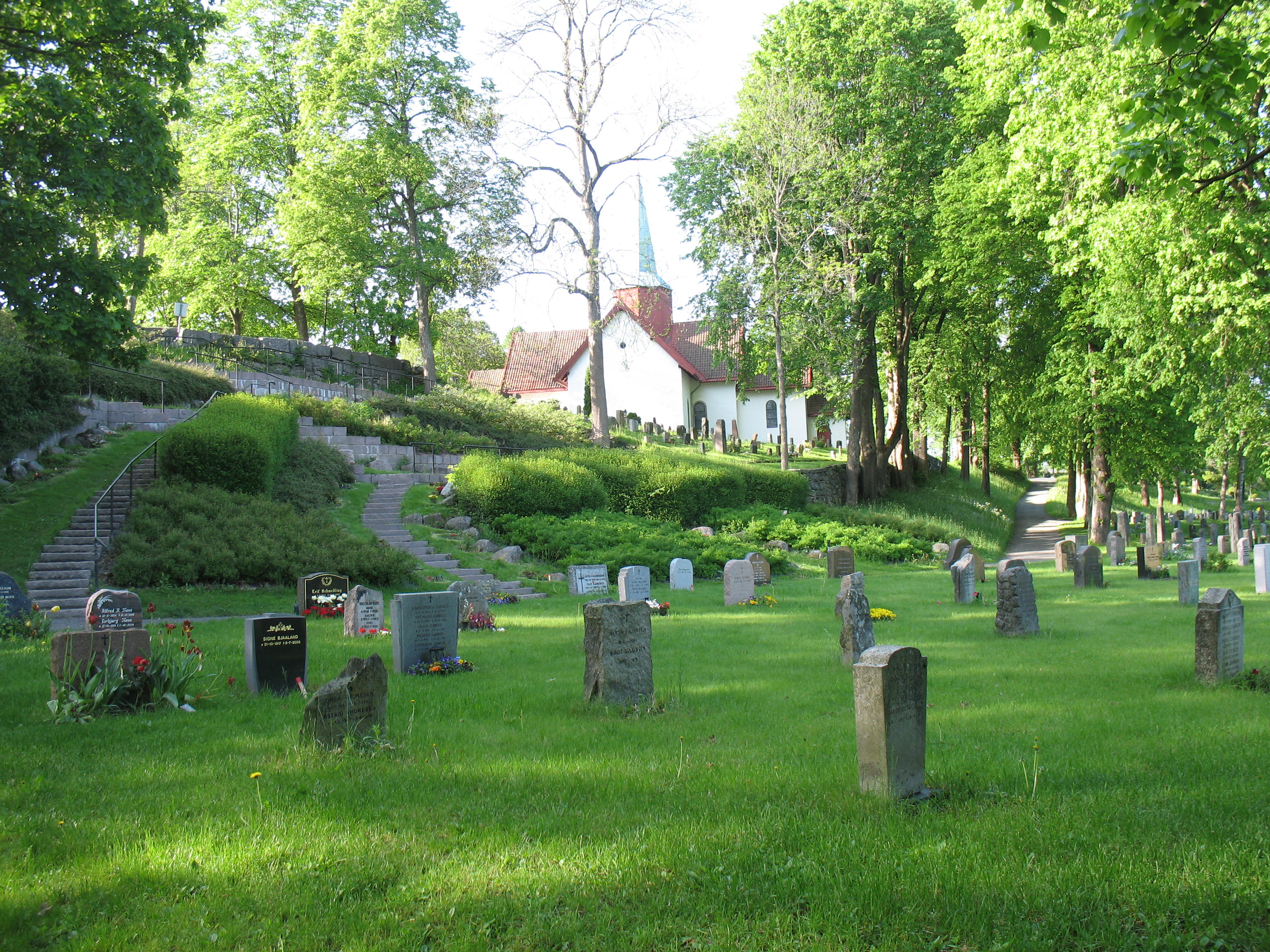

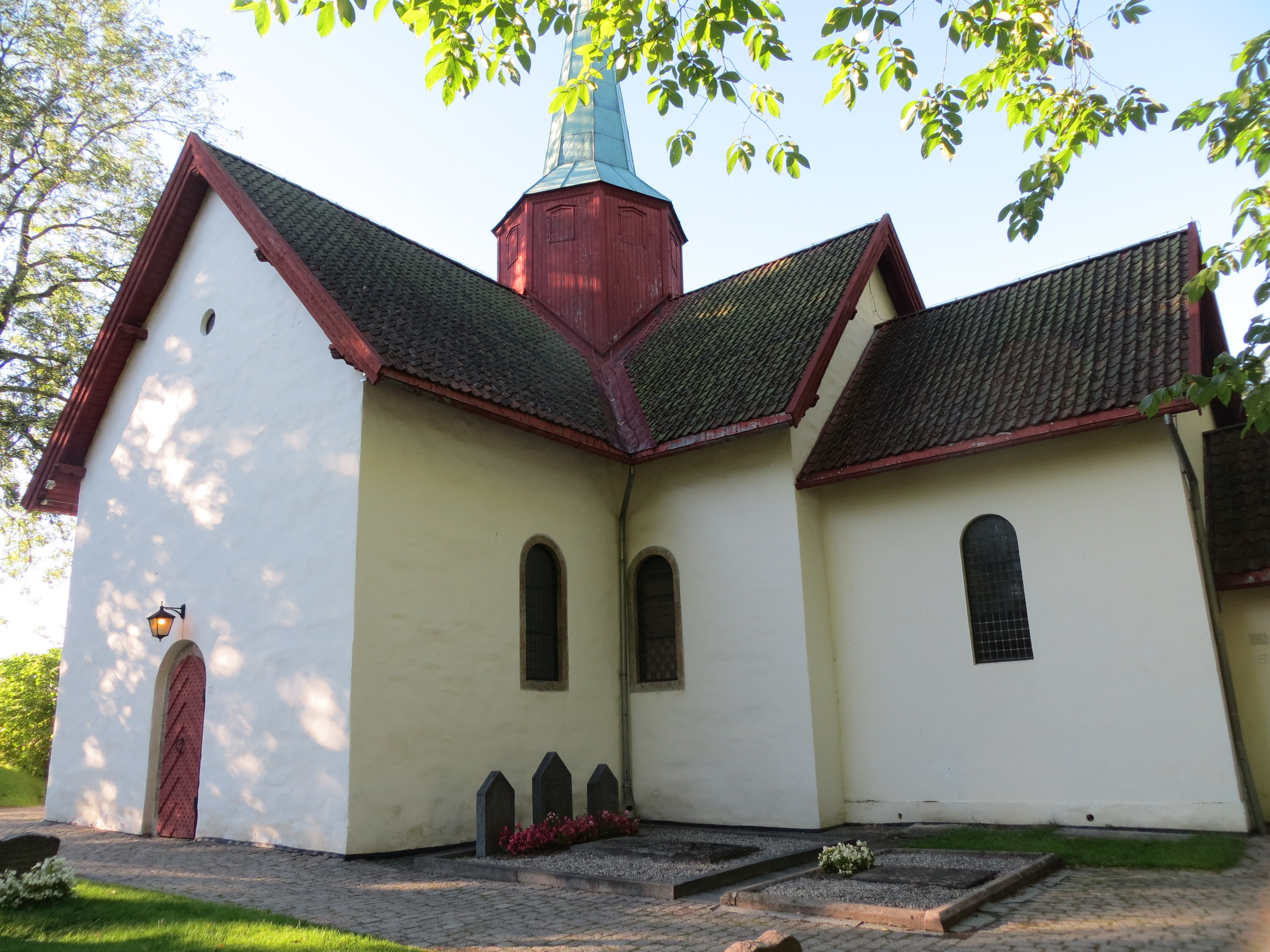
