= Oslo International School =

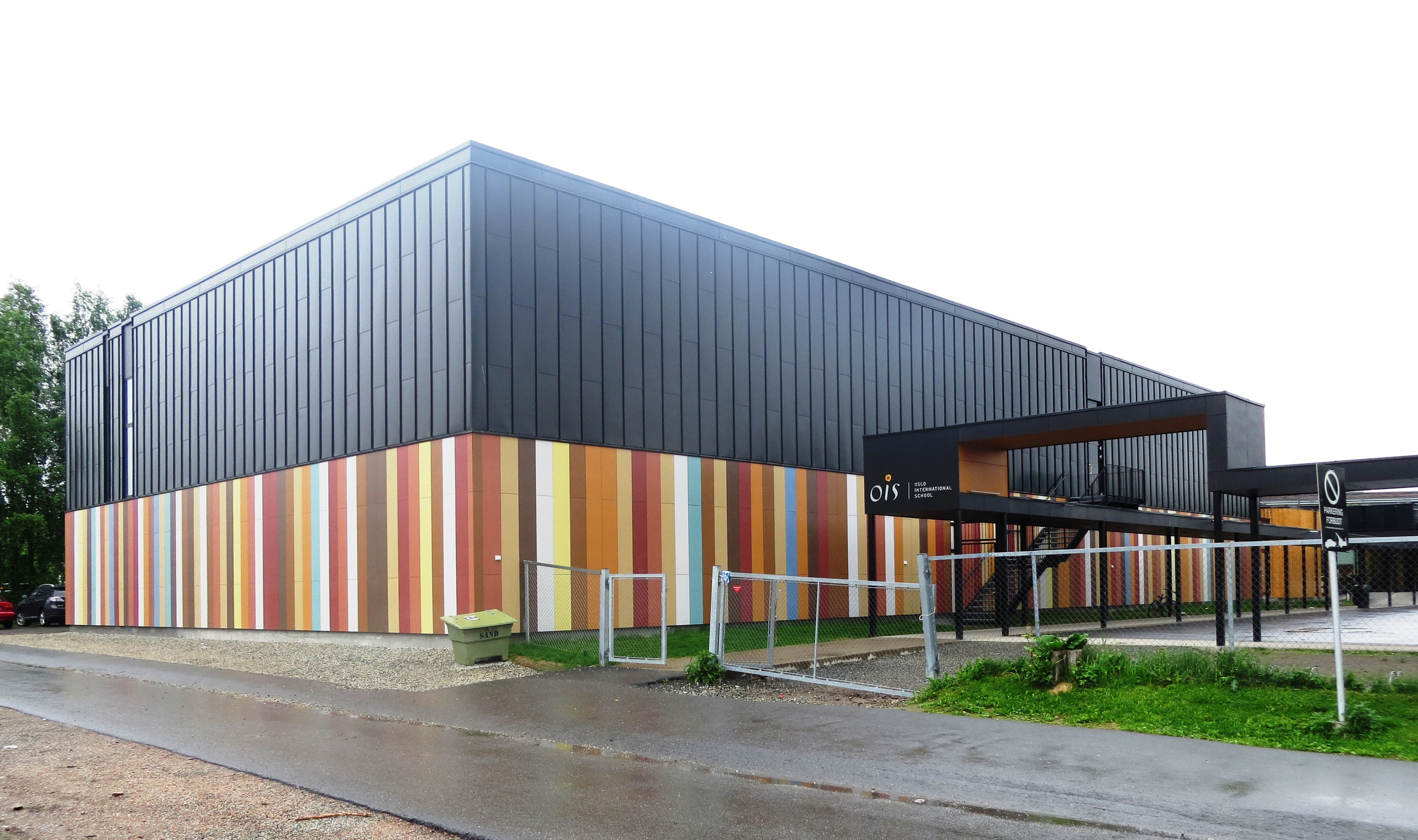

Location
- Gamle Ringeriksvei 53; Bekkestua; Bekkestua, Bærum, 1357; Norway
- Coordinates: 59.91949°N 10.58334°E

Information
- School type: Private
- Founded: 1963
- School number: IBO: 000527
- Grades: Pre K - 12 (known as IB2)
- Age: 3 to 19
- Website: OIS Website

The Oslo International School (OIS) is an international school in Bekkestua, Norway.

== History ==
Oslo International School, which is organised as a not-for-profit educational trust, was founded in 1963. During the 1960s, the school grew from a primary of about 36 pupils to around 180 pupils. Today there are around 600 students from approximately 50 nations.

== Description ==
OIS is a fully accredited independent international day school for students from 3 to 19 years of age (pre-school to IB Diploma). The last two years of the upper secondary are authorised as a world school by the International Baccalaureate Organisation. OIS is located in modern, architecturally unique facilities in a green suburban neighbourhood and is close to Bekkestua, which is a public transportation hub. A school bus service is on offer to all children.

== Curriculum ==
The school is divided into two main divisions: Primary and Secondary. Primary consists of the students attending between the ages of 3 and 9, while secondary consists of the students attending between the ages of 11 to 19. The school offers lessons taught in various different subjects, including mathematics, literacy, arts, science and social studies. The school also gives lessons in Norwegian, French and Spanish as part of their curriculum.

== Facilities ==
The school has multiple facilities including a multipurpose hall, sports fields, an indoor courtyard, a library and a laboratory. There is also an area referred to as the "Innovation Space," which is equipped with multiple different technology equipment.
