= Gjønnes station =

Oslo metro station

Gjønnes
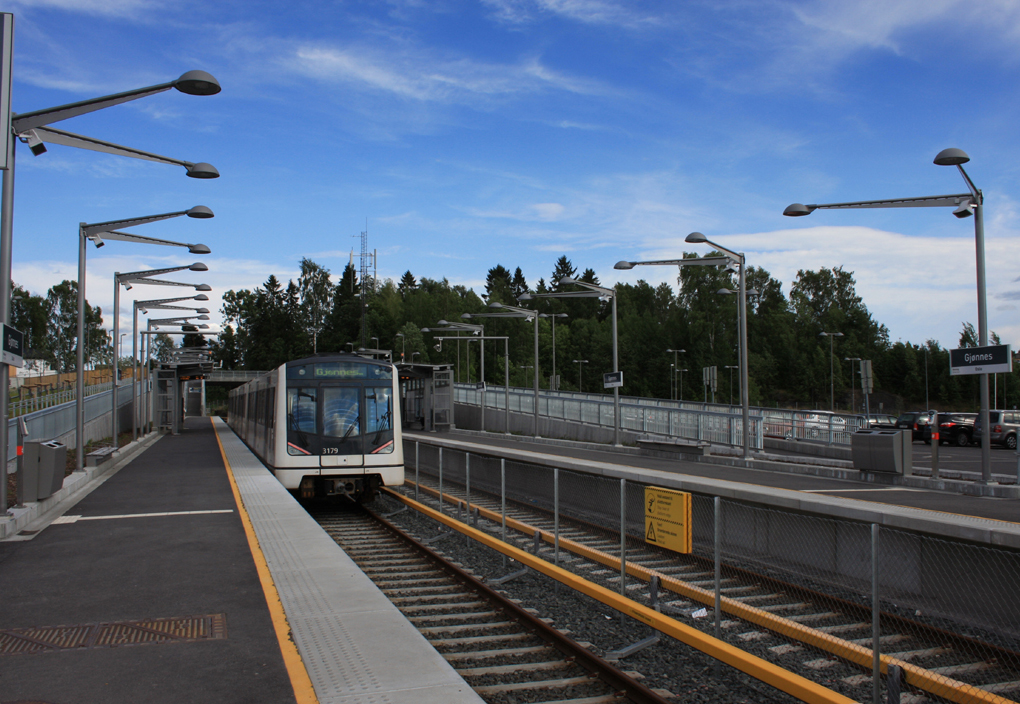
- MX3000 train at the westbound platform

General information
- Location: Gjønnes, Bærum; Norway
- Coordinates: 59.9149°N 10.5807°E
- Owner: Sporveien
- Operator: Sporveien T-banen
- Line: Kolsås Line
- Distance: 11.8 km (7.3 mi) from Stortinget
- Platforms: 2 side platforms
- Tracks: 2

Construction
- Structure type: At-grade
- Parking: Yes
- Cycle facilities: Yes
- Accessible: Yes

Other information
- Fare zone: 1

History
- Opened: 4 November 1924; 101 years ago
- Rebuilt: 8 October 2012; 13 years ago

Passengers
- 2002: 169 average weekday boarding

Services
Preceding station	Oslo Metro	Following station
Haslum towards Kolsås	Line 3 Kolsås Line	Bekkestua towards Mortensrud
Location

Gjønnes is a rapid transit station of the Oslo Metro's Kolsås Line, situated in the Bærum, Norway, neighborhood of Gjønnes, just west of Bekkestua. Located 11.8 kilometers (7.3 mi) from Stortinget, the station is served by Line 3 of the metro, normally with a fifteen-minute headway. Travel time to Stortinget is 22 minutes. The station is a popular park and ride site, with 200 parking places.

The station opened on 4 November 1924 as part of the Lilleaker Line. It has since 1942 been connected to the city via the Common Tunnel, thus becoming part of the Kolsås Line. The station was closed due to budgetary cuts for part of 2003 and 2004, and then closed for renovations from 1 July 2006. The station opened, along with the upgraded track from Bekkestua, on 8 October 2012, after investments of 113 million were used on the section. The upgrades included lengthening the station to six-car platforms and making it accessible.

== History ==
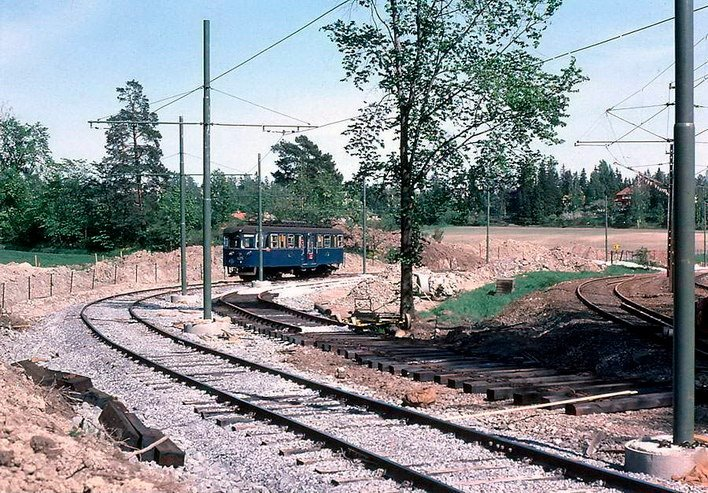
Class C train approaching Gjønnes in 1980

Gjønnes Station was built as part of what was then part of the Lilleaker Line. The tramway had been built to Lilleaker in 1919. However, there were also proposals of extending the Røa Line along the western end of the Kolsås Line. After a major debate the Lillaker alternative was selected by the municipal council in 1921. At first only the extension to Bekkestua was permitted, but on 28 December 1922 Bærum Municipal Council approved a further extension past Gjønnes to Haslum. Construction was carried out by Kristiania Elektriske Sporvei, which later became Bærumsbanen.

The original station received a small building with a kiosk, telephone, ticket sales and freight handling. The line past Gjønnes opened on 4 November 1924. At the time the line was only single track and the station platforms were long enough to handle one-car trains. Development of housing in the area commenced in 1928, when Lønås bought a forest and started redeveloping it into lots for single dwellings.

Freight handling was terminated in 1947. With the delivery of the T1300, the Gjønnes Station was upgraded to handle the new units ahead of 1981. This included raising the platforms height and lengthening them.

Budgetary disagreements between local politicians in Oslo, Bærum and Akershus led to the closure of the Bekkestua to Kolsås leg on 1 July 2003. The move was little popular with the patrons and followed by protests. A political agreement was thereby struck, allowing services to Kolsås to resume from 20 November 2004. However, the line was in such poor shape that the speed was reduced several places. With the opening of the Ring Line on 20 August 2006, the Kolsås Line's trains were needed there and services along the line were closed. Akershus County Municipality considered several options, including connection the line to the tramway, before settling on upgrading the line to full metro standard.

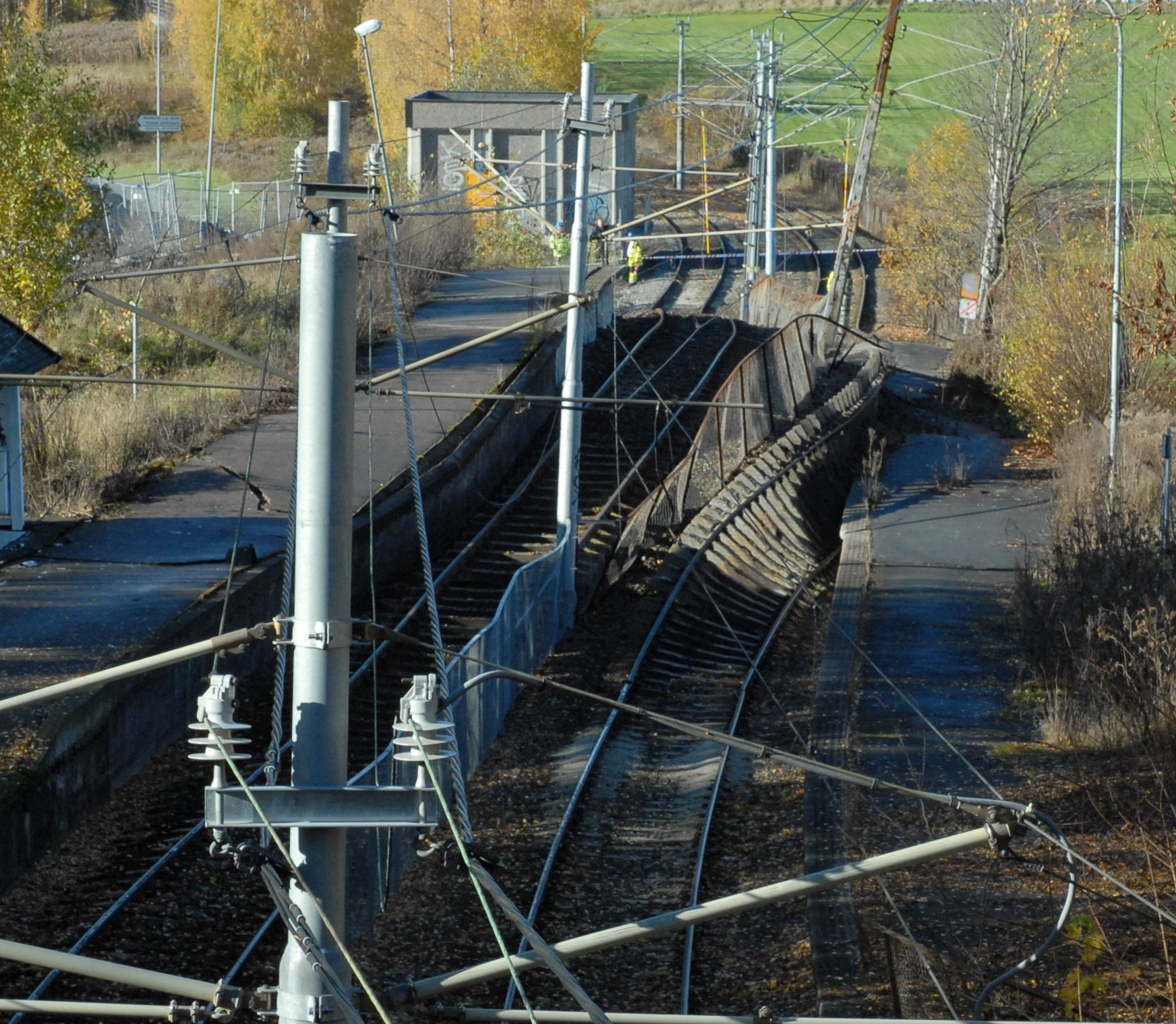
Damage to the station after the 19 October 2008 incident

During the construction of the Bærum Tunnel of the Asker Line, Gjønnes was used as a storage area for earthwork. This caused a land slip which pressed up earthwork a 50 meters (160 ft) long section of one platform and track was pressed up 3 meters (9.8 ft), resulting in the other track lying on its side. During planning the municipality had considered lowering the parking lot. This would allow a second story to be built on top should there be need for increased capacity, while avoiding this structure from dominating the skyline. However, to not delay the construction process, this arrangement was dropped from the plans.

The construction contract was awarded to Veidekke for 113 million Norwegian krone. This included construction of 720 meters (2,360 ft) of right-of-way, including laying of new ballast, tracks and third rail. It also involved construction a culvert under the tracks for access to Gjønnesparken and a bridge for Bærumsveien. Construction ran from May 2011 through August 2012. An all-new station structure was included in the work. Construction was made more complicated because of difficult geological conditions. The upgraded station was officially opened on 8 August 2012. Its opening was the shortest of the eight steps which the Kolsås Line was reopening in. Because of this Sporveien T-banen skipped using a pilot on board the trains for the first time the train drivers ran on the new line. The opening did not alter the number of trains used on Line 2. Gjønnes was the terminus of the Kolsås Line until 15 December 2013.

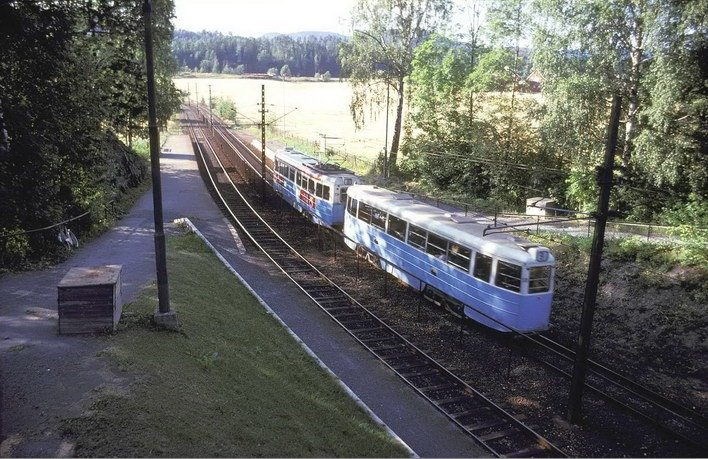
STBO tram at Gjønnes in 1977

The park and ride facility at Gjønnes was popular and became congested. A contributing cause was that Gjønnes is located within fare zone 1, but close to the border of zone 2. Thus people living across from the border could save 500 kroner each month by driving to Gjønnes. This spurred Akershus County Municipality to question whether free park and ride was a good solution. Each parking place costs on average 250,000 kroner and many people drove short distances to reach the station. In addition it receives a fair amount of traffic from Rykkinn and Lommedalen. The pressure on the park and ride was significantly reduced after the line was extended to Haslum and Avløs on 15 December 2013, where a combined 200 new parking places were built.

The station is located next to Gjønnes Farm, which is situated between it and Bekkestua. A 3.7-hectare (9.1-acre) section of the farm was sold to Skanska in 2011 to allow construction of housing. It was originally zoned for single dwellings, but in December 2012 the municipal council approved that the section closest to the station could be used for condominiums, increasing the number of residences from 40 to 150. This results in eight condo buildings with up to five stories. The remaining part of the lot will be used for 50 single dwellings and semi-detachments. Allowing apartments was controversial; neighbors protested, arguing that the condos would be visible and that it would encourage elderly to settle in the area. The municipal council's majority underlined the need for dense development close to transit stations and that apartments would, unlike houses, allow middle-income families and pensioners to live in the vicinity of Bekkestua.

== Service ==
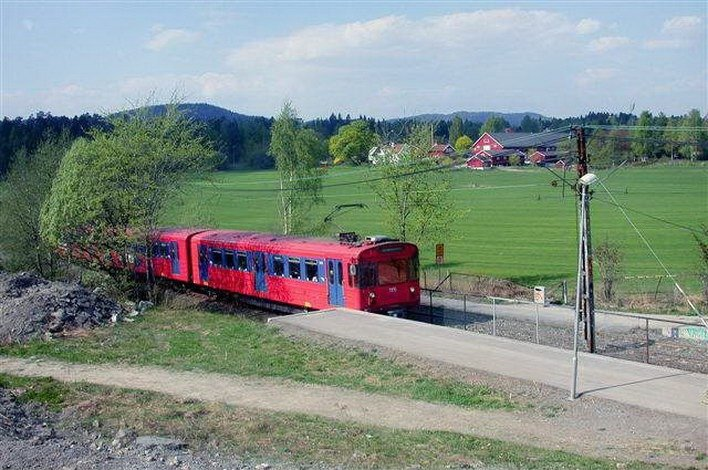
T1300 train at Gjønnes in 2006

Gjønnes is served by Line 3 of the Oslo Metro. During regular hours, is operates at a 15-minute headway. Travel time to Stortinget is 22 minutes. Operations are carried out by Sporveien T-banen on contract with Ruter, the public transport authority in Oslo and Akershus. The infrastructure itself is owned by Sporveien, a municipal company. Service is provided using MX3000 three- and six-car trains. The station had an average 169 boarding passengers in 2002, making it the least-used station on the Kolsås Line and the fourth-least busy on the entire metro network. It is located in fare zone 1.

== Facilities ==
Gjønnes is a rapid transit station situated on the Kolsås Line, 12.2 kilometers (7.6 mi) from Stortinget in the city center. The station meets the metro standard of the Oslo Metro. This includes two 120-meter (390 ft) side platforms and an overpass. The station is constructed in massive concrete. Gjønnes is one of the main park and ride stations along the Kolsås Line. Next to the station is a parking lot with 200 free parking spaces.
