= Norwegian School of Information Technology =

Coordinates: 59°54′41″N 10°45′41″E

- Norges Informasjonsteknologiske Høgskole
- Type: Private college
- Established: 1995
- Dean: Bjørn Jarle Hanssen
- Administrative staff: c. 25
- Students: 600
- Location: Oslo, Norway
- Website: https://nith.no

Norwegian School of Information Technology (Norwegian: Norges Informasjonsteknologiske Høgskole, NITH) is a Norwegian information technology university college located in Oslo, Norway. It previously had schools located in Bergen, Stavanger and Bærum, but these were later shut down.

It was established in 1995 as a merger of NHI Datahøgskolen and NKI Ingeniørhøgskolen. It was known as Den Polytekniske Høgskolen (DPH) until 2002, when it took its current name.

It has 600 students and a faculty of about 25 lecturers.

Since 2007 it is owned by the company Anthon B Nilsen.

In 2014, Westerdals Oslo School of Arts, Communication and Technology was established as a result of the merger of the three colleges Westerdals School of Communication, NISS (Nordic Institute of Stage and Studio) and NITH (The Norwegian School of Information Technology). In 2017 Westerdals Oslo School of Arts, Communication and Technology was bought up and merged with Kristiania University College. Today NITH lives on as the School of Economics, Innovation and Technology at Kristiania University College .
