= Bekkestua =

- Town
- Location in Akershus Bekkestua (Norway South) Bekkestua (Norway)
- Coordinates: 59°55′5″N 10°35′20″E
- Country: Norway
- Region: Østlandet
- County: Akershus
- Municipality: Bærum
- Time zone: UTC+01:00 (CET)
  - Summer (DST): UTC+02:00 (CEST)

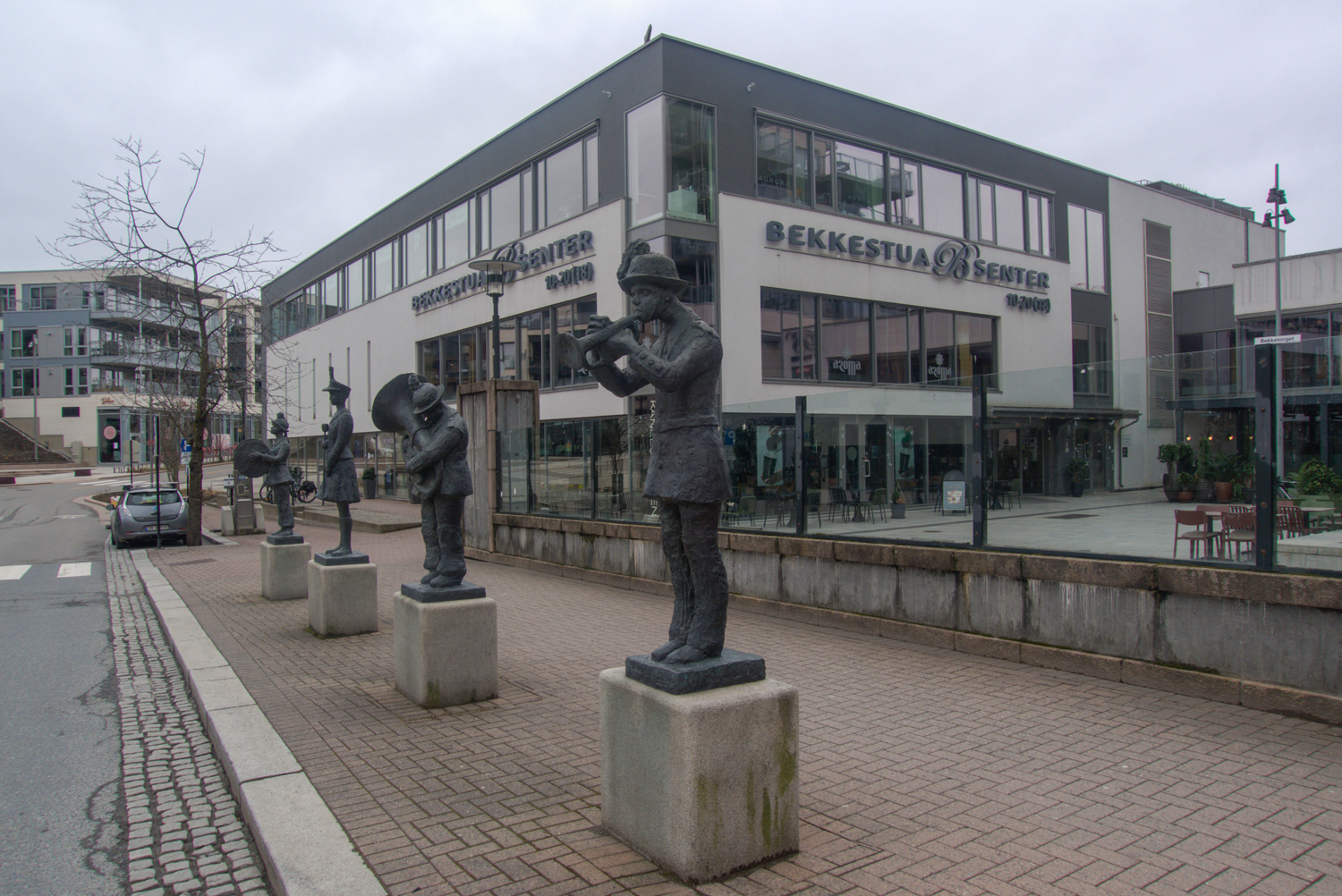
Outside Bekkestua Senter

Bekkestua is a town in the municipality of Bærum, Norway, with a busy bus terminal and a station on one of Oslo's westbound T-bane lines, Kolsåsbanen. It also has its own library, police station and fire station. It has grown to be the second largest centre of the municipality after Sandvika, with small restaurants and shopping centres.

Nadderud stadion, the home ground of the Stabæk Fotball association football club is at walking distance from Bekkestua. It was opened in 1961 as a sporting ground for the Nadderud Gymnas (High School). This high school was later demolished to give space to an extended stadium.

The Oslo International School is located next to Nadderud stadion.

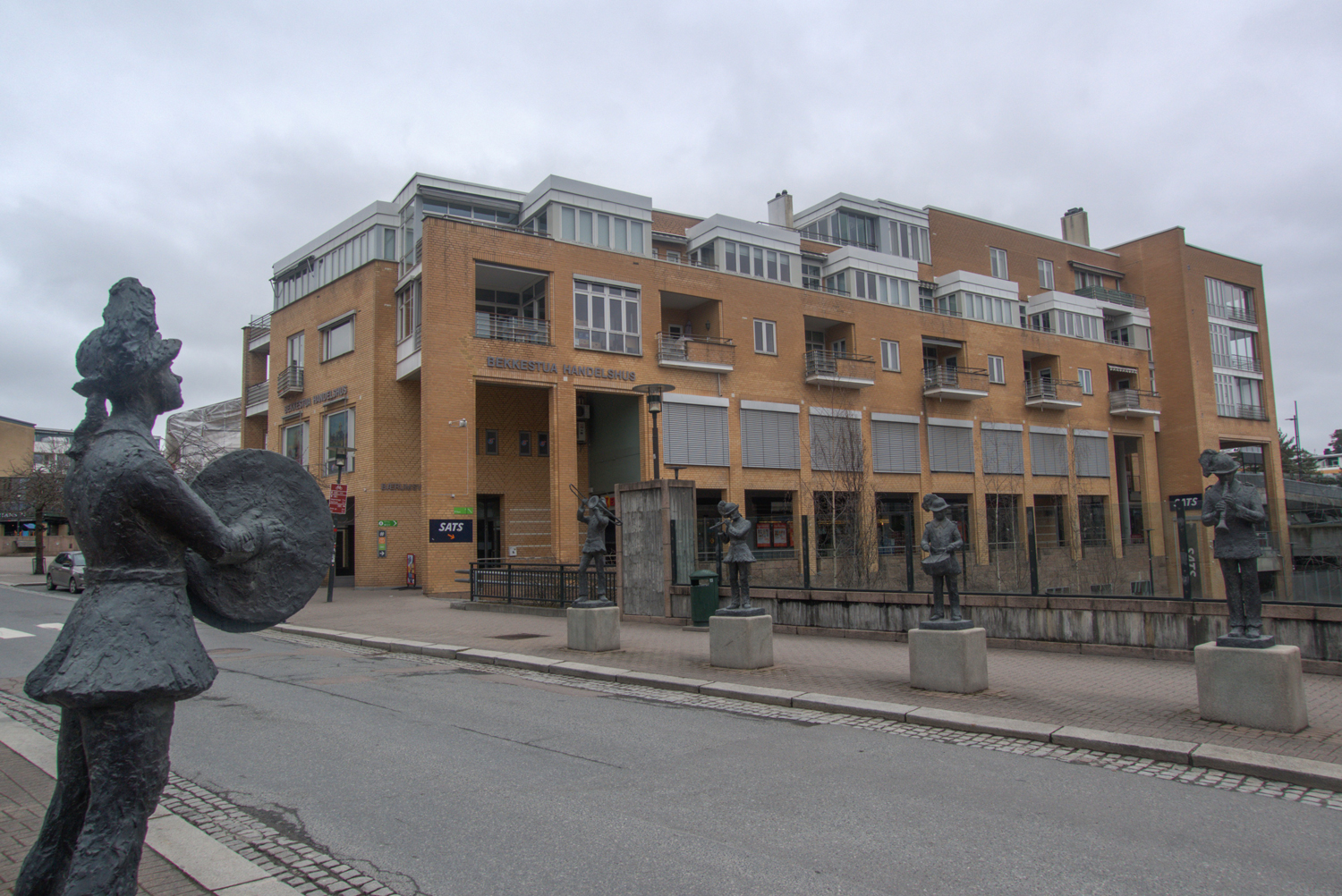
Outside Bekkestua handelshus

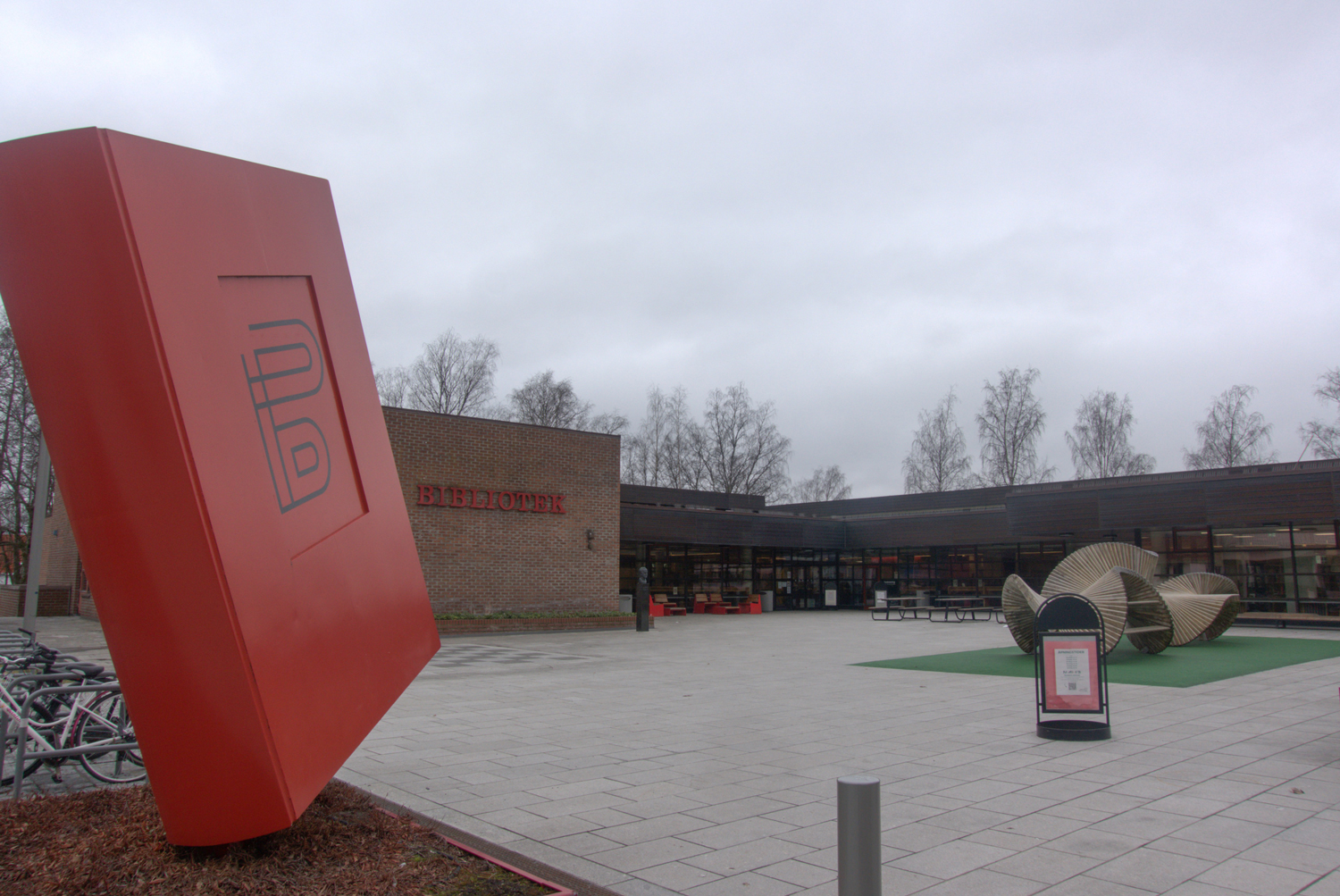
Outside Bekkestua library

== Documentary ==
- Johnny Fagerstrøm: Bekkestua : Opp gjennom tidene i historisk perspektiv. DVD video (2008).
