= Øvrevoll =

District in eastern Bærum, Norway

Coordinates: 59.9323°N 10.6172°E

Øvrevoll is a district in eastern Bærum, Norway.

== Geography and history ==
The district Øvrevoll was built around the farm Øvre Vold, which stems from the separation of Vold farm into two farms; Øvre and Nedre (Upper and Lower) Vold in 1721. Today, Øvrevoll and Voll are sometimes referred to as one district. Øvrevoll borders Jar in the south, Grav in the west, Østerås, Eiksmarka and Grini in the north and Voll in the east.

The farm had one croft under it; Lindeberg. In 1809, Øvre Vold farm was designated as the seat of the district stipendiary magistrate, but he chose to live at Øvre Stabæk instead. In 1826 the farm was registered as having 165 decares of crop, three horses, eleven cattle and twelve sheep. It had various owners until it was bought by dentist Einar Hirsch in 1910. He soon started to parcel out lots, starting with the area around the farm around World War I.

The farm's communications had been drastically improved in 1872, when the road Vollsveien from Lysaker opened. The main purpose was to aid the timber industry around the river Lysakerelva. Vollsveien was connected to Norwegian National Road 168 around 1930. Since 1951 the district is served by Lijordet Station on the Røa Line, located north of the horse racing track. Øvrevoll is the name of a bus stop, served by line 131 of Ruter's bus network.

== Sports ==
Øvrevoll is famous as the site of Øvrevoll Galoppbane, Norway's only track for gallop horse racing. The idea for establishing the track came from Einar Hirsch in 1927, and approved by the central government despite local protests. Construction was carried through between 1930 and 1932. In 1984 a dirt track was added to the grass track, to allow racing and training in different kinds of weather. Proposals from track owners to build housing there have so far been turned down.

The car park at the racing track was for some time used for association football and bandy by the team Øvrevollkameratene, founded on 26 April 1955. A clubhouse was raised further south at Jarmyra in 1968, and that open grass plain at Jar became their home field. The club was named Øvrevoll BK through most of its existence, and on 26 September 2007 it was merged to form Øvrevoll Hosle IL, with clubhouse at Hosle.
