= Fossum IF =

Norwegian sports club

Home colours

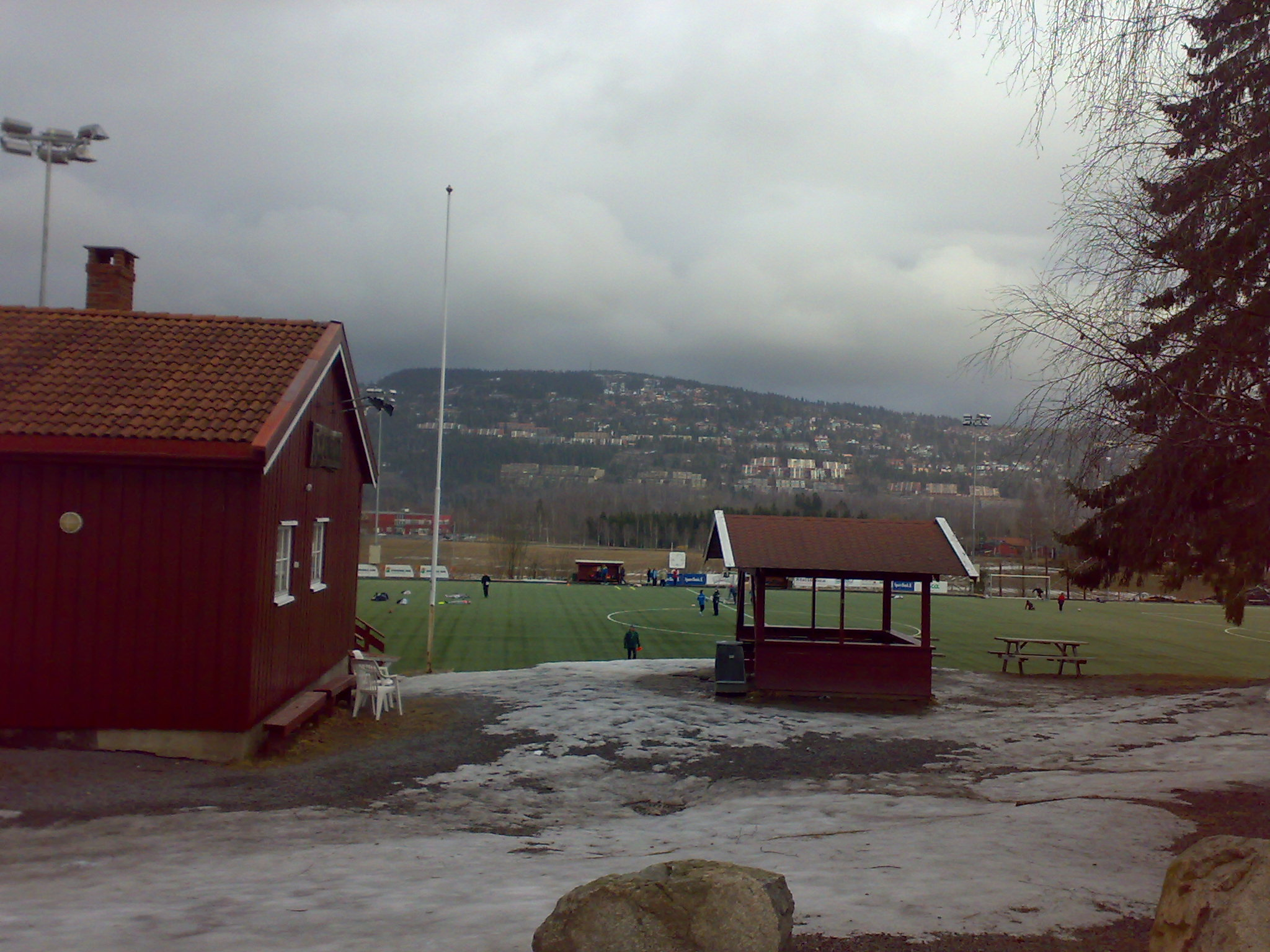
View of the clubroom (left) and Fossumbanen.

Fossum Idrettsforening is a Norwegian sports club from Fossum, Grini, Østerås and Eiksmarka in Bærum. It has sections for cross-country skiing, biathlon, ski jumping, alpine skiing, Nordic combined, orienteering, and football, and was founded on 7 December 1918. It formerly had an athletics section.

The cross-country skiing section has prominent members like Tore Bjonviken and Simen Østensen.

The football team, while not playing at the highest level, has had particularly many well-known coaches, such as Egil Olsen, Per Mathias Høgmo and Per Ravn Omdal. The men's team currently resides in the Third Division (fourth tier of Norwegian football), having last played in the Second Division in the 2000 season.
