= Norwegian National Road 168 =

Road in Norway

Coordinates: 59°56′29″N 10°30′30″E

National Road 168
- Bokmål: Riksvei 168; Nynorsk: Riksveg 168

Route information
- Length: 20.6 km (12.8 mi)

Location
- Country: Norway

Highway system
- Roads in Norway; National Roads; County Roads

Norwegian National Road 168 (Norwegian: Riksvei 168) is a major route between Bærum and Oslo, Norway.

It stretches from the industrial area of Rud, Bærum to the inner city of Oslo. It is connected with important roads like the European route E16 and the National Roads 150 (Ring 3), 161 (Ring 2) and 162 (Ring 1). The entire route is 20.6 km.

Places to be found along the route are Bærums Verk, Øverland, Hosle, Østerås, Grini, Røa, Hovseter, Smestad, Vestre gravlund, Majorstuen and Uranienborg. It ends near the Royal Palace, Oslo.

The road passes through both densely populated and rural areas. Due to the importance of this road and its many large intersections there is relatively heavy traffic during peak hours. A tunnel under Røa is considered. The road consists mainly of two lanes, but from Smestad to Majorstuen it has four lanes. At certain sections, the Røa Line runs parallel to the road.
