= Røa Line =

Rapid transit line in Oslo, Norway

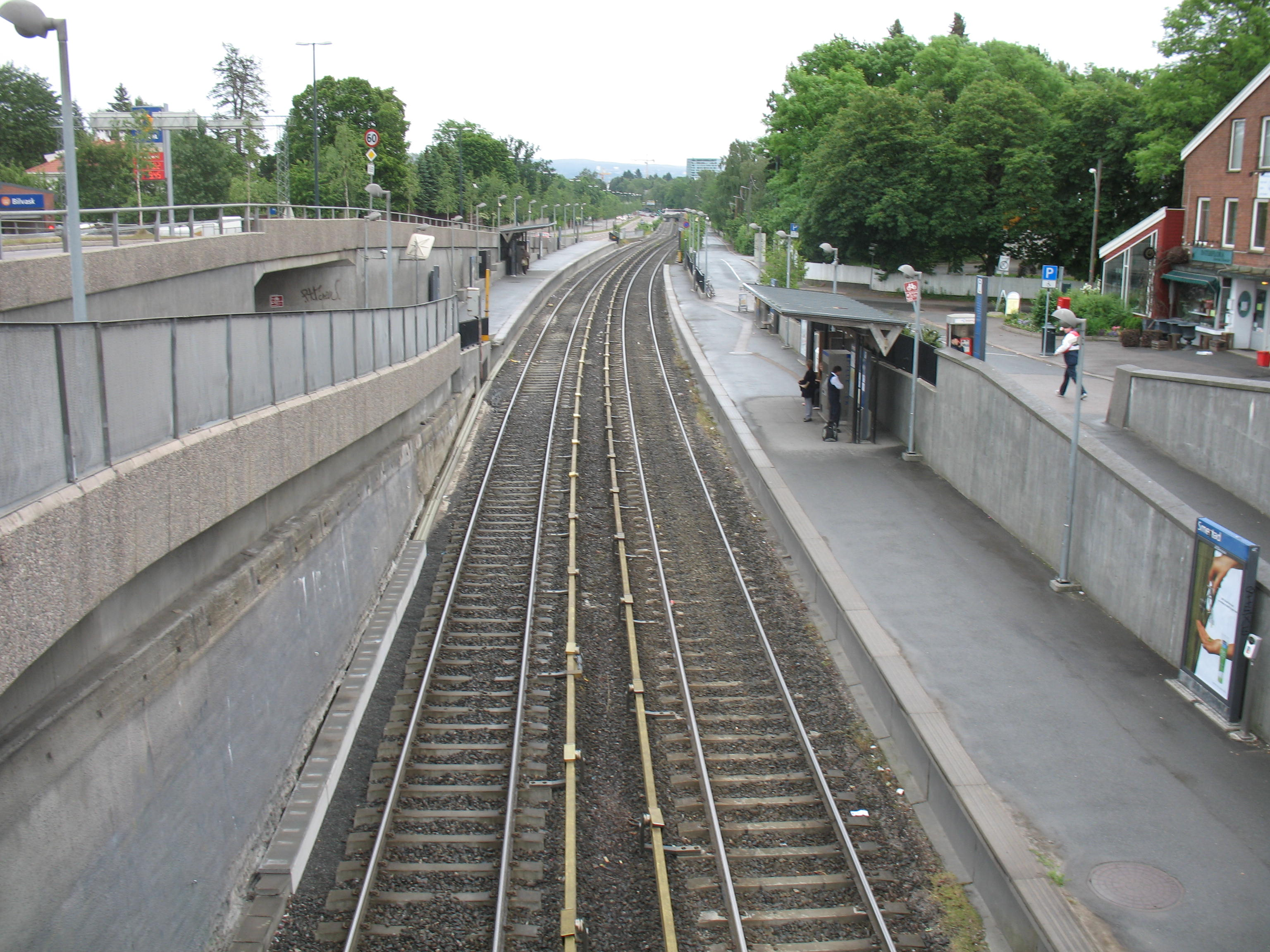
- Smestad was the first terminus of the Røa Line.

Overview
- Native name: Røabanen
- Owner: Sporveien
- Termini: Majorstuen; Østerås
- Stations: 11

Service
- Type: Rapid transit
- System: Oslo Metro
- Operator: Sporveien T-banen
- Rolling stock: MX3000

History
- Opened: 17 November 1912

Technical
- Line length: 7.5 km (4.7 mi)
- Number of tracks: Double
- Track gauge: 1,435 mm (4 ft 8 1/2 in) standard gauge
- Electrification: 750 V DC third rail
- Operating speed: 70 km/h (43 mph)
- Highest elevation: 142.4 m (467 ft)

The Røa Line (Norwegian: Røabanen) is a rapid transit line of the Oslo Metro, Norway, which runs from Majorstuen in Oslo to Østerås in Bærum. It serves neighborhoods such as Smestad, Hovseter, Huseby and Røa in northwestern Oslo, and Grini, Øvrevoll and Østerås in northeastern Bærum. The line is served by Line 2 of the metro, which connects to the city center via the Common Tunnel and onwards along the Furuset Line. The lowest part of the Røa Line, consisting of two stations, is shared with the Kolsås Line, and thus also served by Line 2 of the metro. The Røa Line is owned by Kollektivtransportproduksjon, and operated by Oslo T-banedrift on contract with the public transport agency Ruter.

The first part of the line, originally a light rail, was from Majorstuen to Smestad, and opened in 1912. It was built as a cooperation between the Municipality of Aker and the company Holmenkolbanen, and connected to the Holmenkoll Line's terminus. In 1928, the line received a connection to the city center when the first part of the Common Tunnel was completed. In 1935, the first extension of the Røa Line proper was made, when the line was extended to Røa. In 1942, the Kolsås Line became a branch. Additional extensions to the Røa Line were made in 1948 to Grini, in 1951 to Lijordet and in 1972 to Østerås. By then, the line had become an integrated part of the municipal Oslo Sporveier. The line was upgraded to rapid transit in 1995, became part of the metro and started running through the city center.

== History ==
=== Establishment ===
Construction of housing in the Smestad area started after Kristiania Elektriske Sporvei (KES) established a tramway from the city center to Majorstuen in 1894. Four years later, fund-raising started to build the Aker Avenue towards Smestad, but the recession made fund-raising difficult. The plans were launched again in 1904, and subsequently revised in 1908, by which time they including a tramway along the avenue. In 1910, A. S. Guldberg, Iver Lycke, W. Munthes-Kaas and H. A. Mørk applied for a concession to build a tramway along the route. This was granted by the municipal council in Aker on 26 May. The four individuals then transferred their rights to the municipality, who started negotiating rights with KES, and Holmenkolbanen—the latter who had a suburban tramway running from Majorstuen, the Holmenkollen Line.

An arrangement was made with Holmenkolbanen, where the municipality would expropriate the necessary land and build the bed, while Holmenkolbanen would lay the tracks, the wires and operate the trams. The line would remain owned by the company A/S Smedstadbanen, which was again owned by Aker Municipality. The agreement had a duration of 50 years, but the municipality retained the right to purchase the line if work to extend the line from Majorstuen through the Common Tunnel to the city center had not started by 1917, or had not been completed by 1922. Government approval was granted on 7 July 1911, and the construction was completed on 7 November 1912. The 1.9-kilometer (1.2 mi) long line was single tracked, with passing loops at Borgen and Smestad, which were the only stations in addition to Majorstuen. Holmenkolbanen used a single tram, with departures every 20 minutes. There were extra departures from Borgen to Majorstuen during the afternoon rush-hour.

=== Nationaltheatret expansion ===
The process of extending the Holmenkollen Line from Majorstuen to the city center had started in 1901. The process had been delayed several times because of disagreements between the city and the company, in part because the two could not agree if it should be classified as a railway or a tramway. Construction started in 1912, but stopped again in 1914 because the municipality and the company could not agree on the location of the terminus. The municipality wanted it at Ruseløkkveien, but this would make it difficult for the company to build the tunnel through the city center to connect to the suburban tramways east of the city center. Construction was stopped in October 1914.

The following year, the municipality launched a contest to make the best suggestion for the tram networks. It took five years to select a winner, and this allowed the municipality and company to make a compromise by locating the terminus at Nationaltheatret. But not until 1926 was permission granted for the station. Construction commenced that year and the station and tunnel opened in 1928. When the tunnel had not been completed by 1922, Aker Municipality decided to purchase the line. At the time, the municipality was planning to start its own tram company, Akersbanerne, and the Smestad Line was considered as part of the network, along with the planned Sognsvann Line. But delays caused the Sognsvann Line not to open until 1934. The take-over caused a disagreement between the two companies about payment for the common section, which would still be owned by Holmenkolbanen. Not until 1932 was the issue resolved.

The investments had drained Holmenkolbanen, particularly after it had received a massive lawsuit for damage to adjacent properties during the tunneling. After the issue had been resolved by the Supreme Court in 1931, the company needed more capital to start operations. Aker Municipality offered to transfer its ownership of the Smestad Line and the Sognsvann Line to Holmenkolbanen, in exchange for the majority of shares in the company.

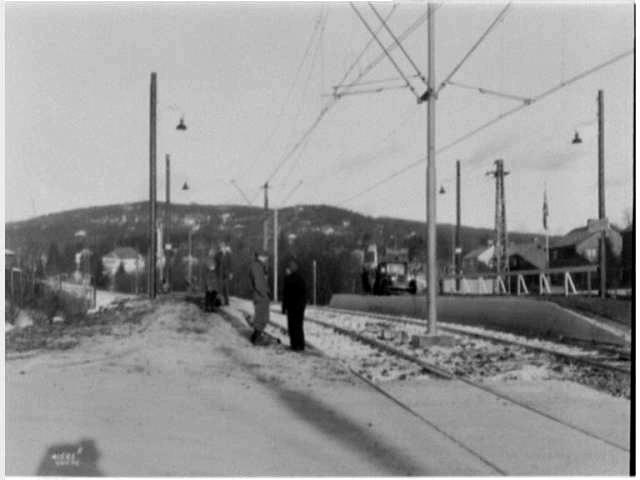
Makrellbekken in 1935, the year the station opened

=== Røa extension ===
In the 1920s, the area towards Røa experienced a growth in housing. Akersbanerne proposed in 1931 to the municipal council that the Smestad Line be extended towards Makrellbekken. Government permission was granted on 26 May 1933, and construction started the same year. The extension was built with single track. When the line was taken over by Holmenkolbanen, the new owner suggested extending the line to Røa. Government permission was granted in on 29 June 1934, and construction started immediately. The 2.9-kilometer (1.8 mi) extension opened on 24 January 1935.

The new line was initially not profitable, because Schøyens Bilcentraler had kept its concession to operate buses in the area. Not until World War II was the bus route terminated. The Røa Line and the Sognsvann Line were both upgraded in 1939. On 6 July, the section from Makrellbekken to Røa was upgraded to double track, and later Volvat was moved and placed inside a tunnel. A level crossing was built at the intersection with Sørkedalsveien, and was completed on 15 December.

=== Branch to Kolsås ===
The Lilleaker Line, which connected to the street tramway at Skøyen, had been extended to Kolsås in 1930. The owner Bærumsbanen instead wanted the line to go the faster route via the Common Tunnel to Nationaltheatret. Concession was granted in 1938 for a link from Jar on the Lilleaker Line to Sørbyhaugen on the Røa Line. The construction was delayed because a bridge needed to be built across Mærradalen, and the company ran out of money, and construction stopped for nine months in 1940. The line was opened on 15 June 1942, and the section from Sørbyhaugen to Kolsås was renamed the Kolsås Line. This resulted in two companies operating from Sørbyhaugen to Nationaltheatret, but an agreement was made where only Holmenkolbanen's tickets were sold on the section, so all revenue went to that company, regardless of the train's operator. The Kolsås Line operated every fifteen minutes along the Røa Line part.

=== Bærum extensions ===
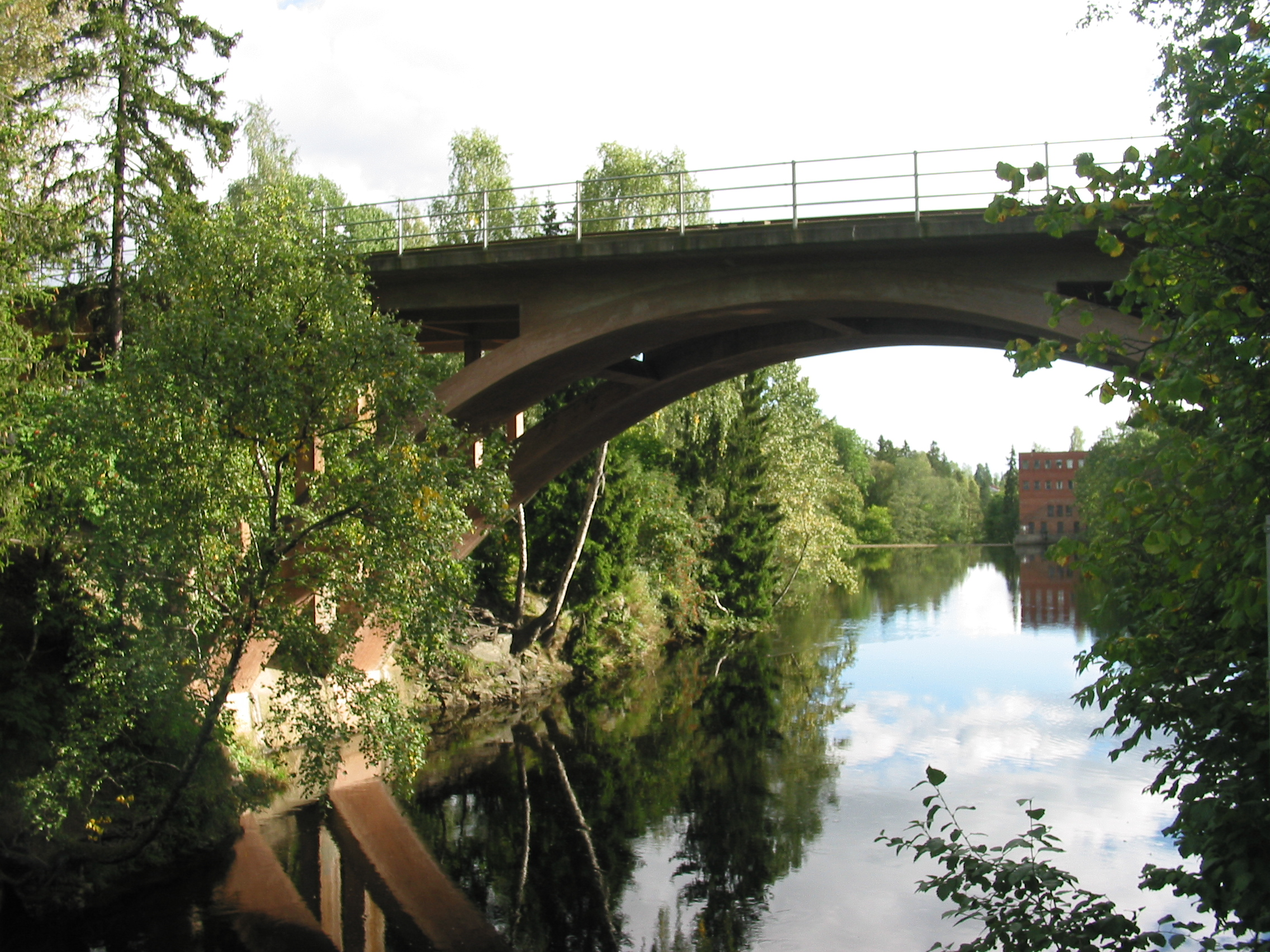
The bridge over Grinidammen

Proposals to extend the line into the neighboring municipality of Bærum had first been launched in 1919. In 1941, construction of an extension to Grini started. The main problem was getting building materials for a bridge to cross Grinidammen, and a local disagreement about where the station at Røa was to be located. The 0.9-kilometer (1 mi) extension was opened on 22 December 1948, after Røa Station had been moved, and the line put in a short tunnel under the center of Røa.

The 1.5-kilometer (0.93 mi) extension via Eiksmarka to Lijordet opened on 3 December 1951. Lijordet was intended to be named Sørbråten, but there was already a station with that name on the Norwegian State Railways' network, and two stations with the same name were not permitted. In 1959, a block signaling system was installed between Røa and Makrellbekken.

During the early 1970s, Bærum Municipality wanted to extend the line onwards to Hosle, and were willing to pay the construction costs. Holmenkolbanen also wanted the municipality to pay for new trams, but the municipality was not willing to do this. The line was therefore only extended to Østerås, which could be reached using the existing fleet. The 0.6-kilometer (0.37 mi) extension was opened in 1972. Since 1978, Holmenkolbanen has had sufficient trams to operate an extension, but since then the municipality has not been interested in extending the line further.

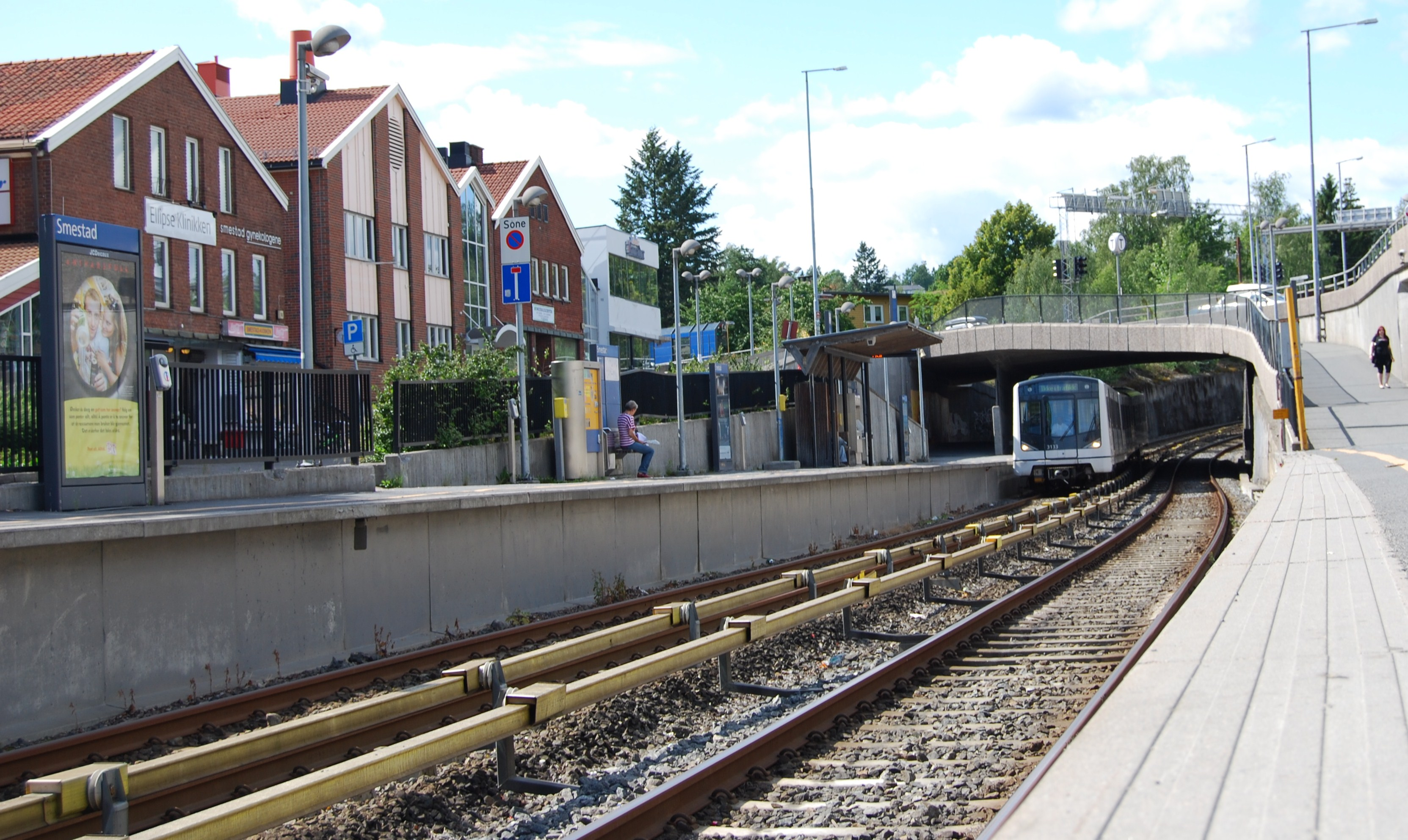
An MX3000 train arriving at Smestad

=== Metro standard ===
The ownership of the line was gradually taken over by the municipality through Oslo Sporveier. In 1975, most of the shares were bought, along with those that Oslo Sporveier had received as part of the municipal merger with Aker in 1948. Gradually during the 1970s and 1980s, Holmenkolbanen became more integrated into Oslo Sporveier, including the two using the same rolling stock, tickets and uniforms. Oslo Sporveier upgraded the line in the last half of the 1970s, laying new ties, upgrading the tracks to higher weight and purchasing new trams.

Plans to have trams run through the city center have existed since 1919. In the late 1940s, Holmenkolbanen revised the plan, and proposed extending the Common Tunnel eastwards. From 1951, the municipality started working on plans for the Oslo Metro in the eastern part of the city. The large difference in traffic between the eastern and western lines caused the plans to be changed during the 1960s, and the eastern network was equipped with third rail power supply. The eastern lines at first terminated at Jernbanetorget, and the plans were to continue the lines onwards towards Bislett. But by the 1970s, these plans changed, largely because of the increase of traffic in the west and decrease in the east. On 7 March 1987, the services from the west, including the Røa Line, were extended from Nationaltheatret to Stortinget, a station that allowed transfer to the metro.

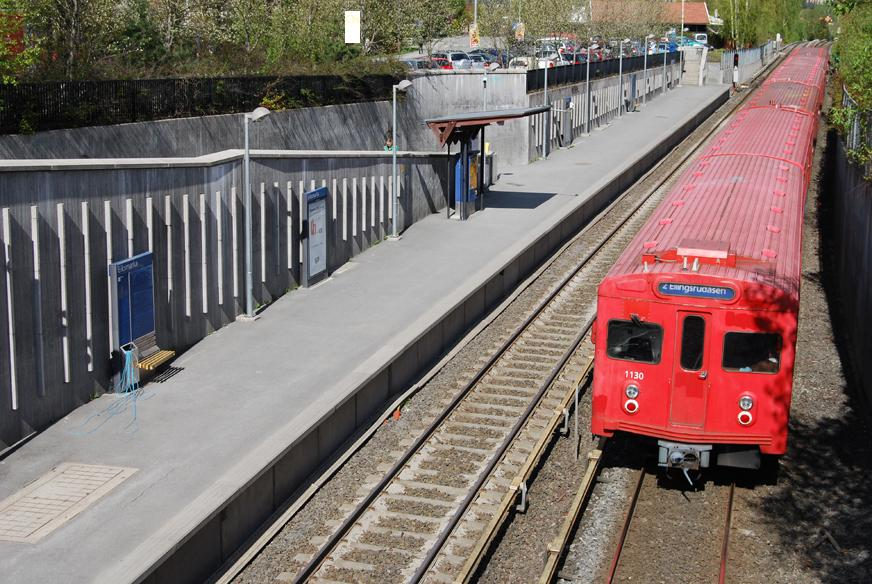
A T1000 train at Eiksmarka

The Sognsvann Line was upgraded to metro standard and reopened on 3 April 1993. The Røa Line was closed on 5 February 1995 to be upgraded to metro standard. The upgrades meant that all platforms needed to be extended to 110 meters (360 ft) to allow six-car metro trains. The only exception was Østerås, that was made only long enough for five cars, although this could easily be extended later. The upgrade involved a complete renovation of the tracks, with the old ones being replaced with new, and increasing the weight to 49 kilograms per meter (33 lb/ft). The overhead wire was replaced with a third rail; this required all four level crossings, at Makrellbekken, Hovseter, Eiksmarka and Ekraveien, to be replaced. In the former three, the track was sunk under the level of the road, requiring several hundred meters of the line to be rebuilt. Pedestrian underpasses were built at Ekreveien, Borgen, Holmen, Huseby skole and Lijordet.

Three stations were closed: Grini, Huseby skole and Heggeli. Volvat kept the two-car length, and was no longer served by the Røa Line, only the Kolsås Line. To compensate for the closing of Huseby skole, Røa was moved back to it original position, causing a heated local debate. The signaling system was replaced with the automatic train protection used on the metro. But the installation was delayed, and a temporary system was used. This caused an accident at Husebybakken, where twelve people were injured. During the upgrade, the area along the line was served by buses. Bus stops could only be established at places where cars could pass, making it difficult to place stops at Røa and Sørbyhaugen. Passengers transferring to the Kolsås Line would normally have 15 minutes longer travel time, and congestion caused delays of up to 30 minutes. This caused more people to use cars, which increased the congestion further. Ridership on the buses was significantly lower than on the rail. The Kolsås Line opened on 20 August and the Røa Line on 19 November. After the opening, the line connected with the Furuset Line as Line 2, and started being served by T1000 trains. The Røa Line, including the common section in the city center, has been extended eight times, more than any other line of the Oslo Metro.

== Route ==
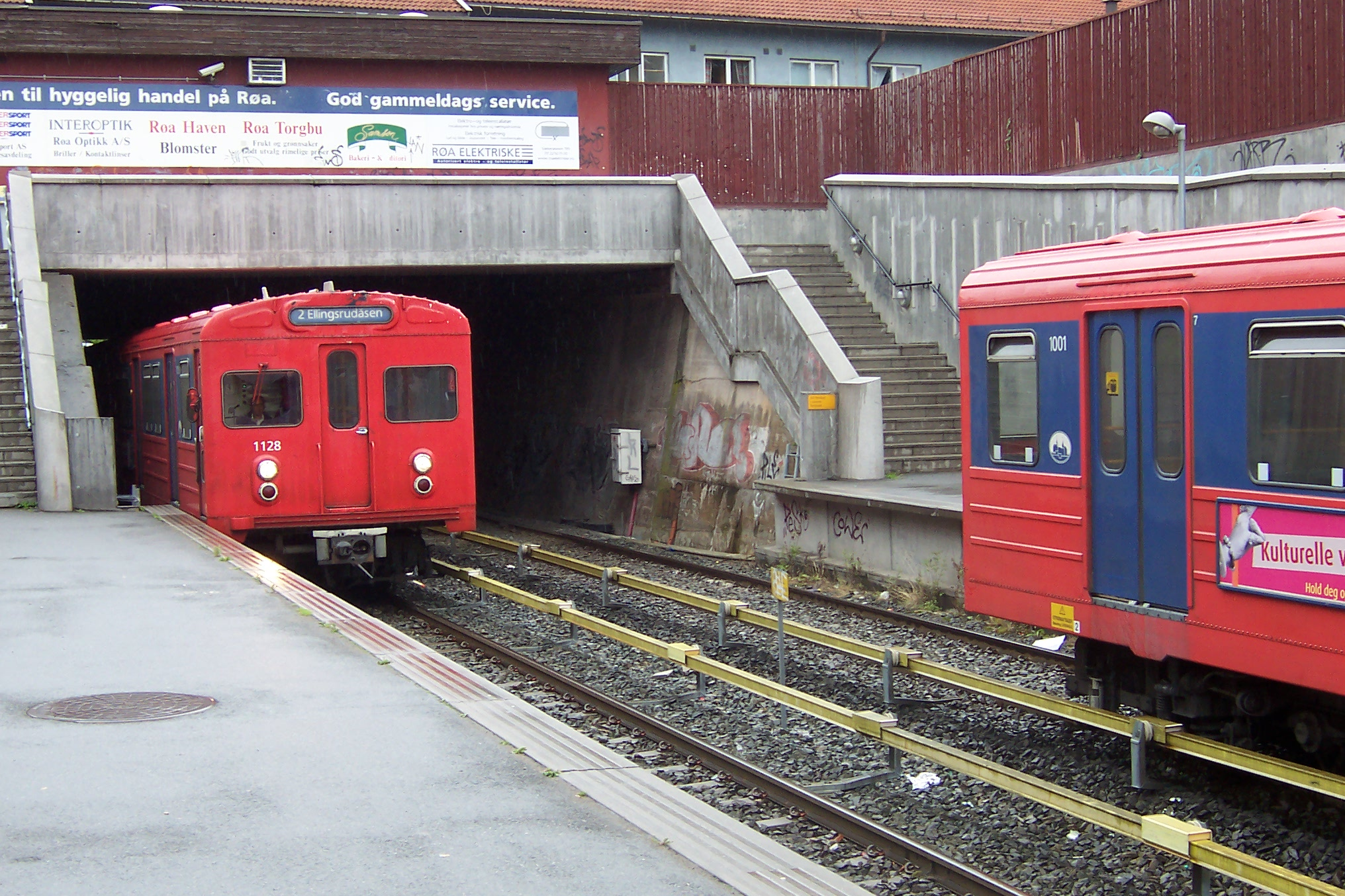
Two T1000 trains meeting at Røa

The Røa Line starts at Majorstuen, a major public transport hub located 2.7 kilometers (1.7 mi) from Stortinget. Majorstuen was the site of the company's head offices, depots, workshops and employee residences. Majorstuen serves several educational institutions, such as Chateau Neuf, MF Norwegian School of Theology, the Norwegian Academy of Music, the Norwegian Police University College, several larger office complexes and the Oslo Tramway Museum. From Majorstuen, the Røa Line and the Kolsås Line follow the same tracks. The line immediately enters a short tunnel, in which the now closed Volvat Station is located, 0.7 kilometers (0.43 mi) from Majorstuen. Borgen follows next, located 1.5 kilometers (0.93 mi) from Majorstuen, and serves a primarily housing area and a larger cemetery.

Next is the now closed Heggeli, and Smestad, located 1.9 kilometers (1.2 mi) from Majorstuen. The areas are mostly single dwellings built in the 1910s, following the arrival of the line. After Smestad, the Kolsås Line branches off and the Røa Line continues past the closed Sørbyhaugen to Makrellbekken, located 2.7 kilometers (1.7 mi) from Majorstuen. The next station is Holmen, located 3.4 kilometers (2.1 mi) from Majorstuen, and Hovseter, located 4.0 kilometers (2.5 mi) from Majorstuen. Hovseter is a residential area with dominated by apartment blocks from the 1970s, and also serves Persbråten Upper Secondary School. The station has previously been used as a terminus for extra rush-hour trains. The line then runs past the closed Huseby skole, located 4.3 kilometers (2.7 mi) from Majorstuen, which served Huseby Leir, the base of the Royal Guard. The next station is Røa, located 4.8 kilometers (3.0 mi) from Majorstuen, which has also been a terminus for extra rush-hour trains. Røa has substantial commercial properties and is located close to Bogstadvannet and a golf course. The line then passes Ekraveien, located 5.2 kilometers (3.2 mi) from Majorstuen, which is the last station located in Oslo.

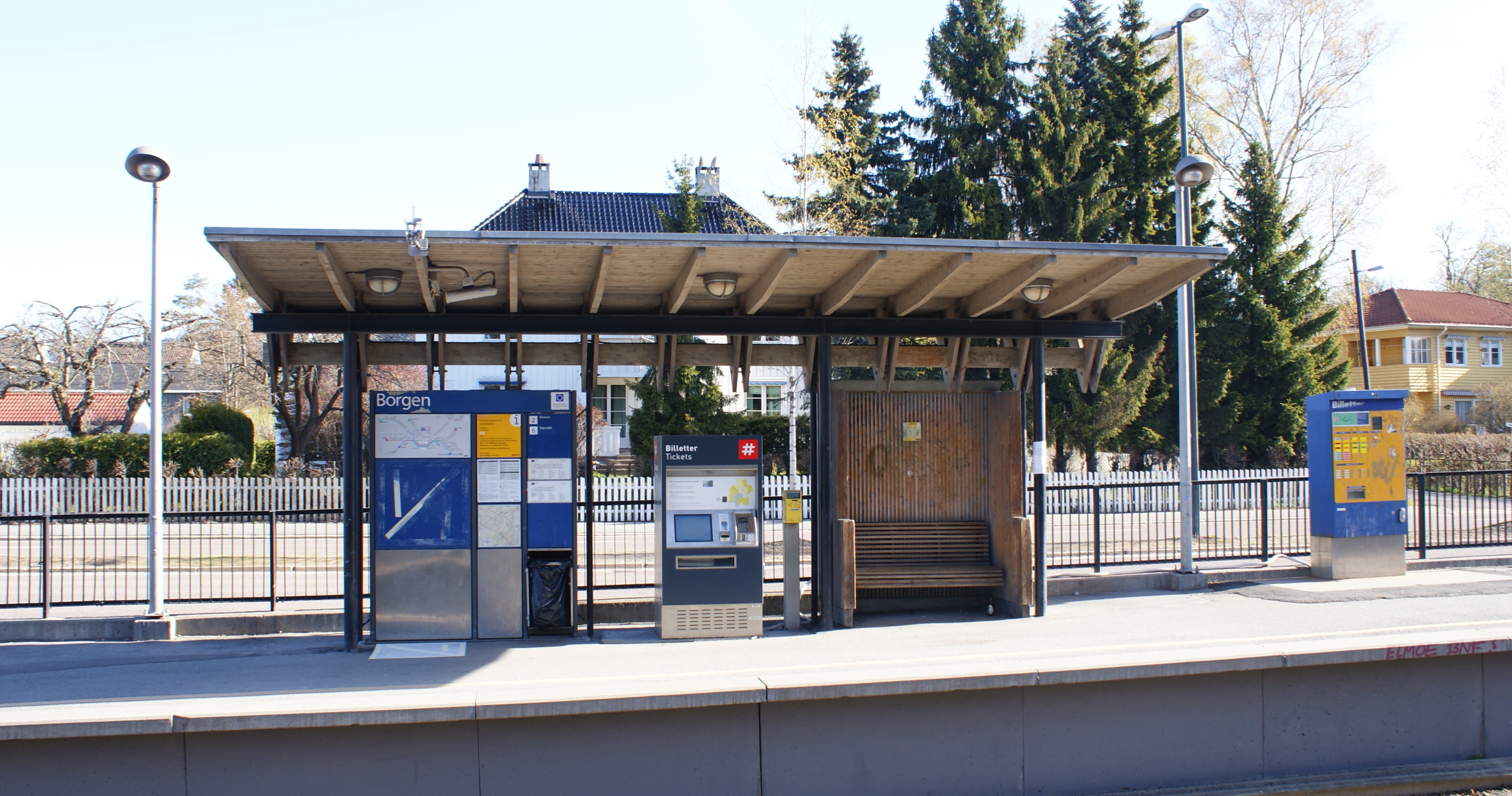
The shed at Borgen

The line then runs over Lysakerelva, which is also the border to Bærum, and past the closed Grini. The next station is Eiksmarka, located 6.2 kilometers (3.9 mi) from Majorstuen, which until the late 1970s had the line's only spur, to allow ballast stone to be loaded from Franzefoss. The area has single dwellings from the 1950s. Next is Lijordet, located 6.9 kilometers (4.3 mi) from Majorstuen, which serves Øvrevoll Galoppbane, the country's only gallop race course. The line's terminus is Østerås, located 7.5 kilometers (4.7 mi) from Majorstuen. There are some commercial and office buildings in the vicinity of the station, although the area is dominated by housing.

== Service ==
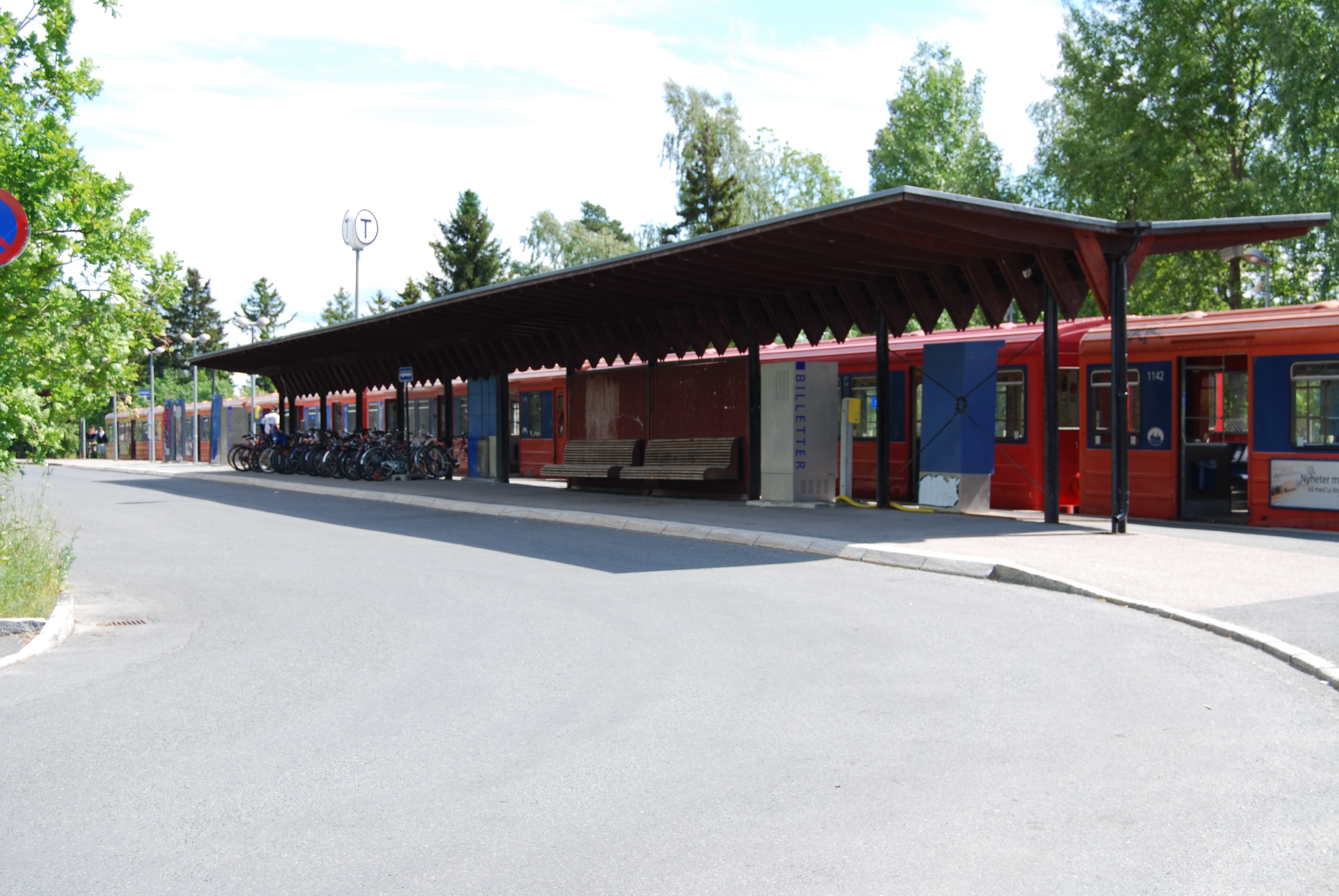
The terminus Østerås has a short distance between the metro and buses.

The Røa Line is served by Line 2 of the Oslo Metro, which continues from Majorstuen via the Common Tunnel and connects to the Furuset Line. The line runs every 15 minutes, with enhanced service weekdays between 7 and 19 giving eight departures an hour. During late evenings and Saturday and Sunday mornings, it runs every 30 minutes. The lower part of the line, from Majorstuen to Borgen, is also served by Line 2, which continues along the Kolsås Line. Along this section, there is twice the frequency. Travel time from Østerås to Majorstuen is 16 minutes, to Stortinget is 20 minutes, and to Vestli on the Grorud Line is 50 minutes. The metro and the line are owned by Kollektivtransportproduksjon and operated by Oslo T-banedrift on contract with Ruter.

The line crosses into Bærum, but the entire metro system is within a single fare zone. Ticket machines are available at all stations, and the system is operated with a proof-of-payment system. Smestad is a transfer station to the Kolsås Line (Line 2), while Majorstuen is a transfer station for other west-bound lines. Transfer to Ruter buses can be made at Majorstuen, Smestad, Hovseter, Røa and Eiksmarka. Transfer to the Oslo Tramway can be made at Majorstuen to lines 11, 12 and 19, serving the Briskeby Line, the Homansbyen Line, and the Frogner Line. In the Common Tunnel, Jernbanetorget is the transfer station for Oslo Central Station, which serves all mainline trains in Eastern Norway. Most west-bound mainline trains can also be reached at Nationaltheatret.

== Future ==
Proposals for the line have been made since the extension to Østerås. The current municipal master plan calls for the line to be extended to Bekkestua Station, where it would again intersect with the Kolsås Line. One possibility is also that the service be continued along the Kolsås Line and a new branch be built to Sandvika, the municipal center of Bærum. However, an extension has not been a priority for the municipal politicians, although the right-of-way has been secured, which will simplify construction.
