= Michael Vadseth =

Norwegian footballer (born 1974)

Personal information
- Full name: Michael Andre Vadseth
- Date of birth: 14 March 1974 (age 52)
- Position: Forward

Senior career*
Years	Team	Apps	(Gls)
–1995	Brattvåg		
1996–1997	Lyn	5	(0)
1998	Fossum		
1999–2003	Manglerud Star		
2004	Skeid	22	(6)
- Nordstrand
- * Club domestic league appearances and goals

Michael Andre Vadseth (born 14 March 1974) is a retired Norwegian football striker.

A prolific goalscorer in Brattvåg IL, Vadseth was picked up by Lyn Fotball in 1996. Securing promotion to 1997 Eliteserien, he only amassed five league games in two seasons and was let go. He played for Fossum IF in 1998, then Manglerud Star in 1999. He continued playing for them under the moniker FK Oslo Øst, until 2004 when he took one year in Skeid before eventually becoming playing assistant coach of Nordstrand IF.
