= Voll, Akershus =

- Village
- Location in Akershus
- Coordinates: 59.9302°N 10.6219°E
- Country: Norway
- Region: Østlandet
- County: Akershus
- Municipality: Bærum
- Time zone: UTC+01:00 (CET)
  - Summer (DST): UTC+02:00 (CEST)

Voll is a district in eastern Bærum, Norway.

The district Voll was built around the farm of the same name. The farm was mentioned as Vælli in 1398, Woldt in 1578, Wold in 1723 and later Vold. It belonged to the St. Hallvard's Cathedral (now in ruins) during the Middle Ages, and later the state church. In the middle of the seventeenth century the farm came on the hands of bailiff Paul Iversen Vold (1595–1682), who owned several farms in Bærum. In 1721 the farm was separated into two; Nedre and Øvre (Lower and Upper) Wold. The latter farm developed into a district of its own, Øvrevoll. In 1835 the former croft Rugland was separated from Nedre Vold. Today, Øvrevoll and Voll are sometimes referred to as one district. Voll borders Øvrevoll in the north and west, Jar in the south and west and the river Lysakerelva in the east.

In 1826 the farm was registered as having 105 decares of crop, two horses, six cattle and nine sheep. This was considerably less than Øvre Vold. The farm also has a history of limestone burning; it contributed limestone to the erection of Akershus Fortress in 1602. However, the limestone was not collected at the farm land, but at Fornebo. Agricultural production on the farm continued well into the twentieth century, especially after horticulturalist Edv. Ellingsen bought the farm in 1921. It was later built up with housing.

The farm's communications had been drastically improved in 1872, when the road Vollsveien from Lysaker opened. The main purpose was to aid the timber industry around the river Lysakerelva. Vollsveien was connected to Norwegian National Road 168 around 1930. The area is served by line 131 of Ruter's bus network.

Institutions located at Voll include the Finnish Evangelical-Lutheran Congregation in Norway, Finnish: Norjan suomalainen evankelis-luterilainen seurakunta. The local sports team is Øvrevoll Hosle IL.
