= Norwegian Radiation Protection Authority =

Norwegian government agency

Norwegian Radiation and Nuclear Safety Authority

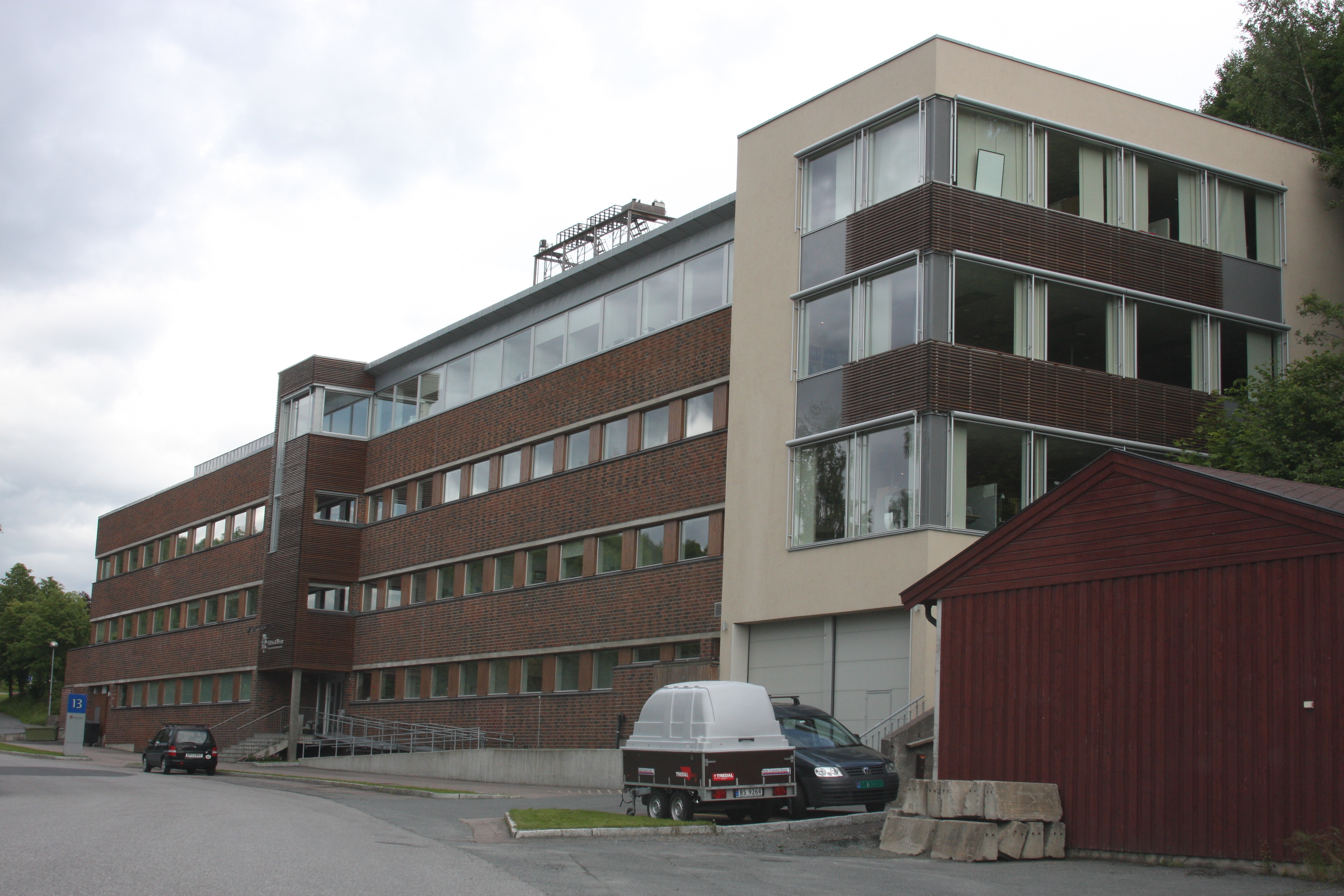

Agency overview
- Formed: January 1, 1993
- Preceding agencies: Nuclear Energy Safety Authority; National institute of Radiation Hygiene
- Jurisdiction: Government of Norway
- Headquarters: Østerås, Bærum Municipality, Akershus
- Employees: 120
- Agency executive: Per Strand, Director, National Radiation Protection Authority
- Parent agency: Ministry of Health and Care Services

Norwegian Radiation and Nuclear Safety Authority (Norwegian: Direktoratet for strålevern og atomsikkerhet, abbreviated to DSA) is a Norwegian public agency under the Ministry of Health and Care Services headquartered in Østerås in Bærum Municipality which is part of the Greater Oslo Region. It works as an authority in the area of radiation protection and nuclear safety. NRPA falls under the Ministry of Health and Care Services, but serves all ministries and departments on issues relating to radiation.

== History ==
The NRPA was created on January 1, 1993 through the consolidation of the former Nuclear Energy Safety Authority with the National institute of Radiation Hygiene.

== Structure ==
The NRPA is responsible for: overseeing the use of radioactive substances and fissile material, coordinating contingency plans against nuclear accidents and radioactive fallout, monitoring natural and artificial radiation in the environment and at the workplace, increasing our knowledge of the occurrence as well as monitoring risk and effects of radiation. It has regional offices in Tromsø and Sør-Varanger and is divided into three sections:

- Department of Emergency Preparedness and Environmental Radioactivity
- Department of Radiation Protection and Nuclear Safety
- Department of Planning and Administration

== International cooperation ==
NRPA is involved in extensive international cooperation. This includes cooperation on standards of management, but also a growing collaboration on research across borders. NRPA cooperates with International Commission on Radiological Protection (ICRP), and International Atomic Energy Agency (IAEA).
