= Grini =

District in northeastern Bærum, Norway

Coordinates: 59.9494°N 10.6304°E

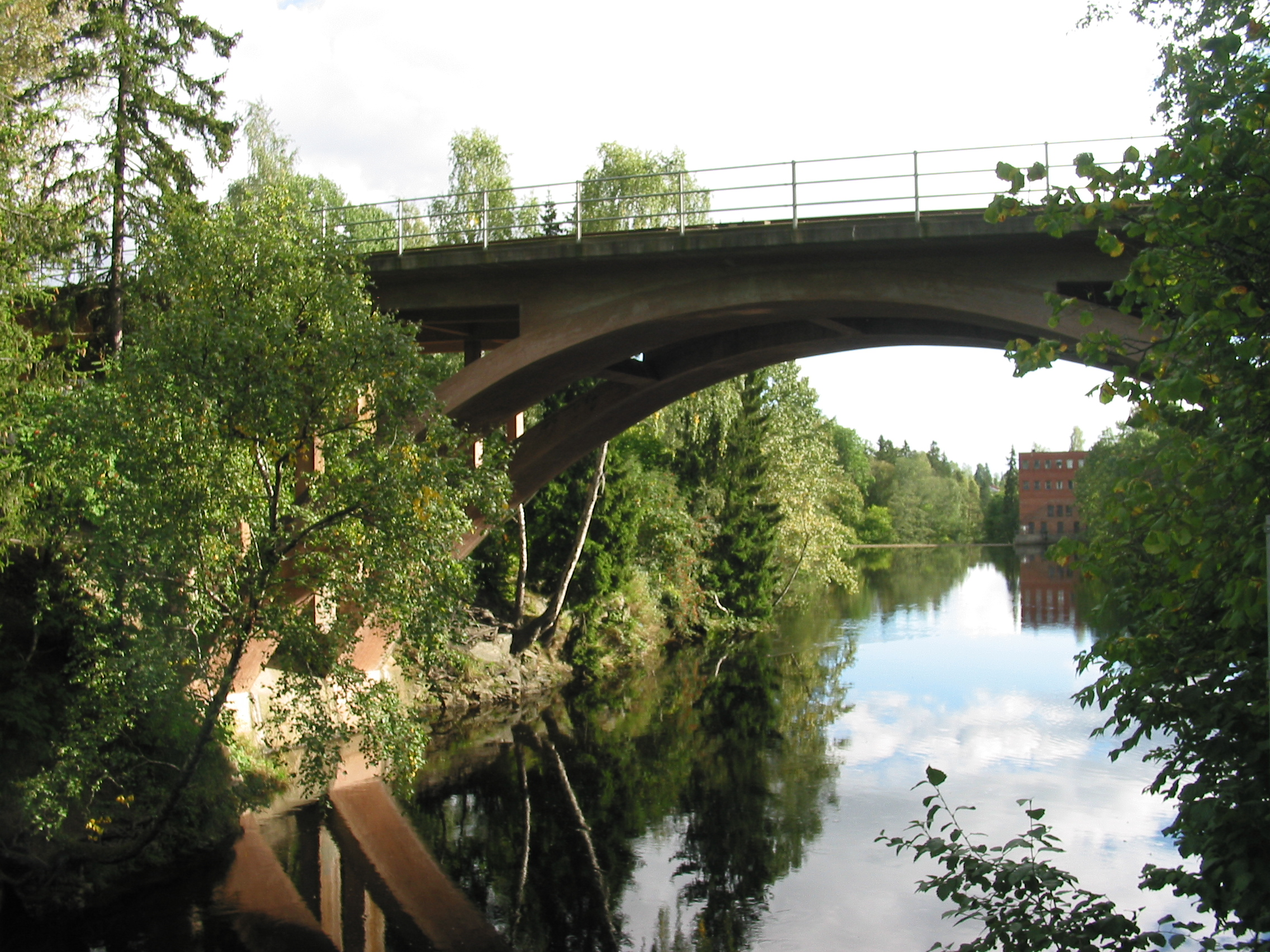
Røa Line bridge over Grinidammen

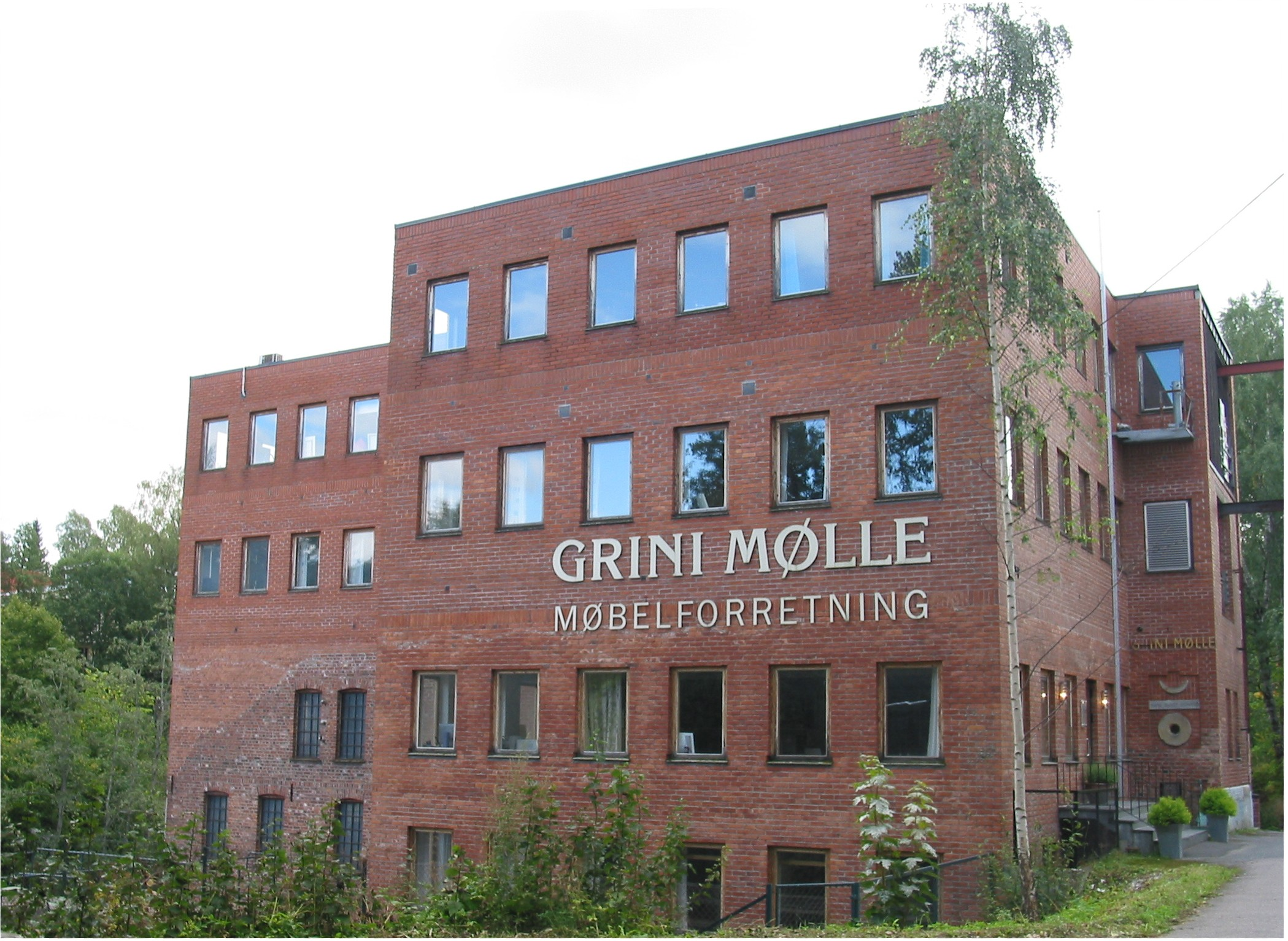
Grini mølle, the former mill

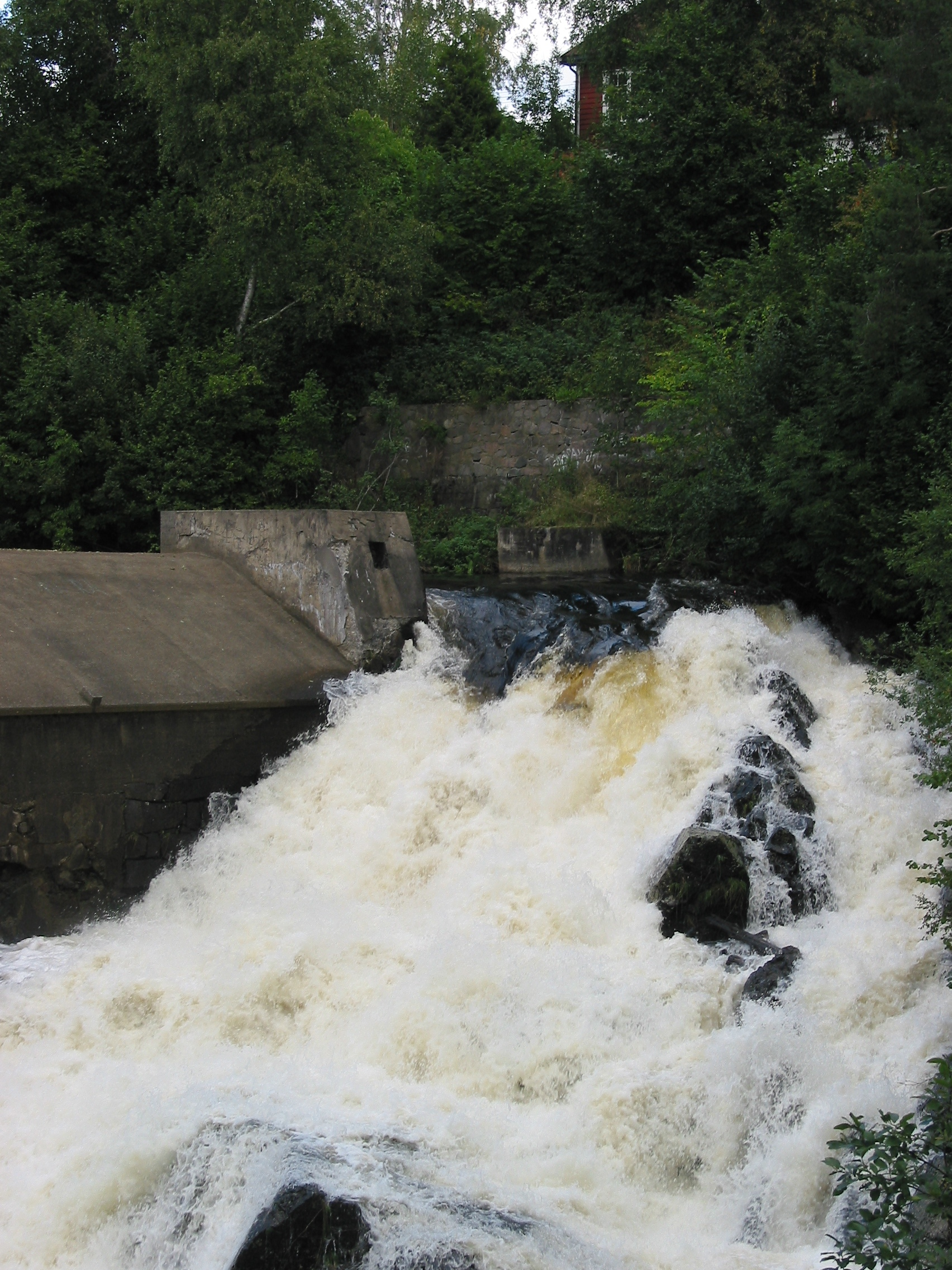
Grinifossen

Grini is a district in northeastern Bærum Municipality, Norway.

== Concentration camp ==
The name Grini is best known from the concentration camp of the same name, but this camp lay further west and had no actual connection to the Grini area.

== History ==
The name Grini is a variant of Granvin (a placename used elsewhere), and stems from spruce trees in the area. The Old Norse form was Grǫnin. The farm Grini is known at least since 1348, when it was divided into a northern and a southern part. Both farms belonged to the Church of Norway, but the crown usurped the property following the Protestant Reformation. The dwelling house was erected in 1658, three years before the property was sold from the crown to a private person. Between the mid-seventeenth century and the mid-nineteenth century the property was owned by the Leuch, Anker and Wedel-Jarlsberg families. It was bought by Ole Ellefsen Gjedsø in 1854; he later became mayor of Bærum. Grini was the easternmost farm in Bærum Municipality, which at the time bordered Aker Municipality. (now it is part of Oslo Municipality, following a 1948 municipal merger)

The border was the river Lysakerelva, and along it the Wedel-Jarlsberg family continued owning property. A smaller industry had developed alongside the river, including a mill, sawmill, brickworks and a lime burner. The sawmill was discontinued in 1888 due to a new sawmill being built further north at Fossum. The brickworks was closed in 1902, and the mill in 1904. From 1913 to 1946 a power station operated in place of the mill; it later became a furniture factory. Its purpose was to provide power for the industry at Fossum, but excess power was sold to locals.

Grini has lent its name to topographic features in this part of the Lysakerelva river. Grinidammen is the name of a small lake north of the waterfall Grinifossen. Grini Bridge runs over the small lake.

The area around the Cotter's farm Bratli was built up in the 1930s, and the southern part of the Grini district was built up after World War II. The hill Grinilunden was used for a chapel.

== Transportation ==
The road Griniveien, a part of the Norwegian National Road 168, cuts through the area. It was named so in 1926. The river crossing was moved northwards in 1978, as a new bridge was opened in 1974. A part of the old road was downgraded to a local road, moving the National Road further away from the residential area. Petitions have been made to move the road further north, but to no avail yet. Mainly, it is the area south of this road that has been developed. North of the road, some land has been used as a golf course which was inaugurated in June 2002.

The area was served by Grini station on the Oslo Metro between 1948 and 1995. Early plans for an extension of the line, then called the Smestad Line, involved Fossum, but later plans did not include this northern point. Construction of the extension into Bærum started in 1941, and involved erecting a railroad bridge over Lysakerelva. At times, the bridge would be been left unfinished for the time being, due to wartime hardships concerning economy and supplies. Locals then used the half-finished pillars as diving platforms. Grini station was finally opened in 1948, and was the terminus until 1951 when Lijordet (terminus) and Eiksmarka stations came. In 1972 Østerås station was added. In 1995, several stations on the line were rebuilt. Some were removed as they could no longer conform to the new standards of three cars (e.g. Volvat). Grini station was discontinued as well; it fell victim to low traffic because many passengers chose to walk over the Oslo border to Ekraveien station, from where the fare was cheaper.
