= Øvrevoll Hosle IL =

Norwegian sports club

- Full name: Øvrevoll Hosle Idrettslag
- Founded: 26 September 2007
- Ground: Hoslebanen; Jarmyra
Home colours

Øvrevoll Hosle Idrettslag is a Norwegian multi-sports club from eastern Bærum.

== Organization and history ==
Sections are bandy, baseball, association football, ski jumping, cross-country skiing, and handball. The club covers the areas Øvrevoll, Voll, Grav, parts of Bekkestua and Jar as well as Hosle. The club colors are white.

Old logo of Øvrevoll BK.

The club was founded on 26 September 2007 as a merger of Øvrevoll BK and Hosle IL. Hosle IL was founded in 1947 as Grav og Voll IL. The name was changed to IL Bæring and later Hosle when Bæring merged with Hosletoppen. Øvrevoll BK was founded on 26 April 1955 as Øvrevollkameratene. The football and bandy teams of the two clubs had cooperated long before the actual merger.

== Sports ==
The men's bandy team plays in the First Division, the second tier. It played in the Premier League as late as in 2005–06.

The men's football team played in the Third Division, the fourth tier of Norwegian football, until 2010, when they pulled their team because of a lack of players. Its best known player was Andreas Hauger, who played for the team in 2009. The best known female footballer is Siri Nordby, who started her career there.

Handball player Karoline Dyhre Breivang started her career in Hosle. The best known club member overall is ski jumper Bjørn Einar Romøren.
