= Hovseter =

Neighbourhood of Oslo, Norway

Coordinates: 59.9479°N 10.6576°E

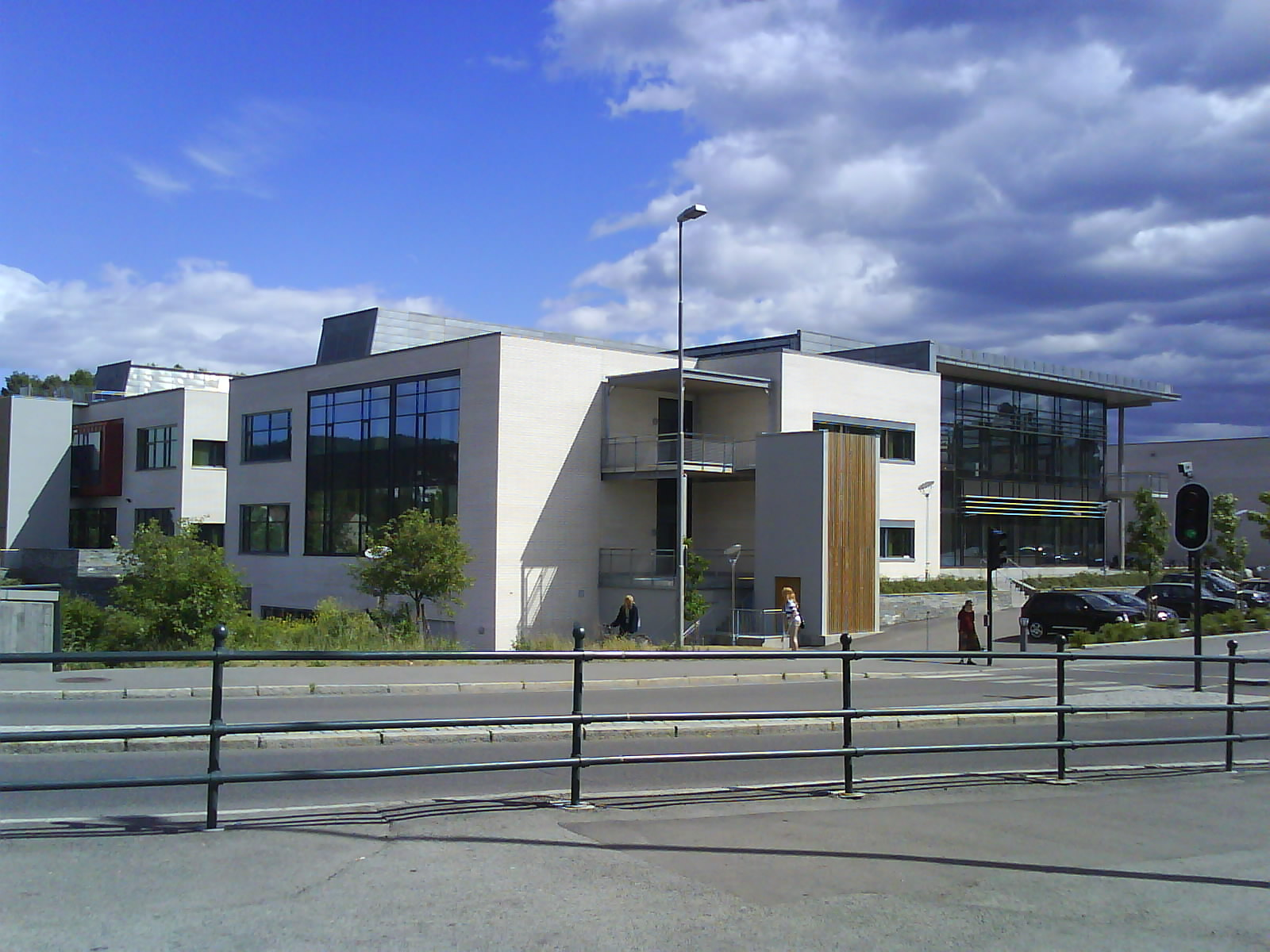
The local upper secondary school, Persbråten.

Hovseter is a neighbourhood of Oslo, Norway, that comes under Vestre Aker kommune and lies between Røa and Holmen.

Hovseter was originally a place under Hoff farm. The site was mainly developed in the 1970s as a project associated experimental political sociology and was listed under the then Social Democratic government. The buildings consist largely of blocks of flats in the low/medium altitude by Norwegian standards. Some of the buildings are older, however, and originate from the 1950s. Various areas outside Hovseter also stems from the reconstruction period after the Second World War in Norway and holds a joint architecture for homes on the west side of Oslo, in the form of house or villa-standard. Roads Gamle Hovsetervei, Henriks vei, Jeppes vei, Pernilles vei, Arnebråtveien, Ankerveien, Røaknekken and Røahagan are built in the same period and hence holds great architectural similarities of their distinctive post-war expressed through architecture and materials.

== Schools ==
- Persbråten high school is located in the northern town of Huseby West Aker, right Hovseter station. They moved into new premises in 2007.
- Huseby school also has its location near Hovseter and is a primary school with 515 pupils.
- Huseby Resource Centre is also located Hovseter and was originally a school for the blind.
- Hovseter junior high (middle) school is located on Hovseterveien 74: 8th, 9th and 10th grade.

== Major places ==
- Hovseter Club, a municipal-sponsored youth that offers various recreational activities for youth in the community.
- The nursing home is located in the borough Hovseter West Aker. Hovseter home was dedicated in 1978. The nursing home has room for 185 residents who are spread over six floors.
- Many playschools are situated in and round Hovseter but there is also open day care centre available .Its open 3 days a week.

== Access ==
It is served by the station Hovseter on the Oslo Metro, and the Norwegian National Road 168 passes near.It is also served by bus No 46 from Ullerntroppen to Grensen.
