= Siri Nordby =

Norwegian footballer (born 1978)

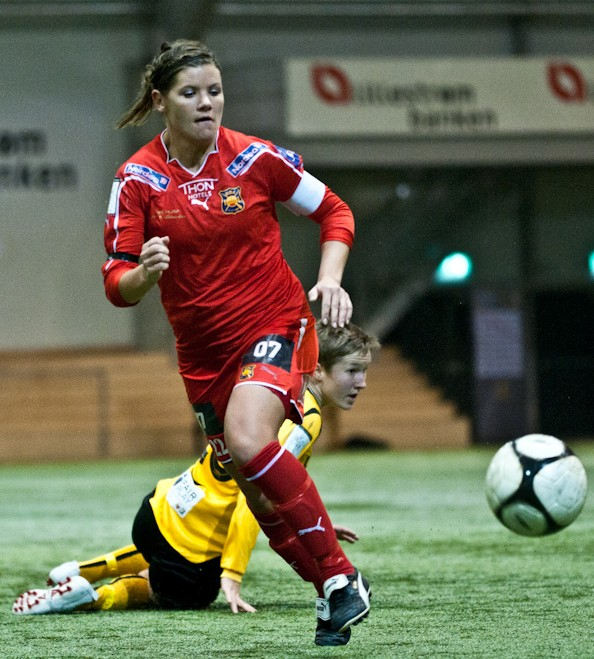

Personal information
- Full name: Siri Kristine Nordby
- Date of birth: 4 August 1978 (age 48)
- Place of birth: Bærum, Norway
- Height: 1.66 m (5 ft 5 in)
- Position: Defender

Team information
- Current team: Røa
- Number: 22

Youth career
- Hosle

College career
Years	Team	Apps	(Gls)
1997–2000	USF Bulls		

Senior career*
Years	Team	Apps	(Gls)
1996–2012	Røa	250	(29)
2013–	Øvrevoll Hosle		

International career^{‡}
2004–2008	Norway	42	(2)
- * Club domestic league appearances and goals as of 10 November 2008 ‡ National team caps and goals as of 10 November 2008

Siri Kristine Nordby (born 4 August 1978) is a Norwegian football defender who played over fifteen years for Røa in Norway's Toppserien league. She also played for the Norway women's national football team.

== Career ==
Nordby started her career at Hosle IL, but quickly moved to neighboring Røa when she had to play for an all-girls team. Nordby has played with Røa almost her entire life, aside from the few years she played in the United States at the University of South Florida, and has tallied 250 appearances for the club. She is Røa's set-piece specialist (free kicks, corners and penalty kicks) as well as the vice-captain, and in 2008 captained Røa to "the Double" of Norway's league and Cup titles. She has even signed a lifetime contract with Røa to demonstrate her commitment to the team.

She made her debut with the national team on 24 July 2004 in a match against Germany. Nordby scored her first goal for the national team on 3 May 2008 in a Euro qualification match against Israel. Her second goal came on a penalty against Brazil in the quarterfinals at the 2008 Summer Olympics.

Nordby often played left- and right-back on the national team under coach Bjarne Berntsen, who is known to place his players in different positions.

She was a part of the squad for the 2005 European Championships that won silver after being defeated by Germany, 3–1, in the final. She was also a member of the 2007 Women's World Cup squad that finished the tournament fourth as well as the 2008 Olympics team which was beaten by Brazil in the quarterfinals.

On 21 October 2008 Siri Nordby and four other Røa players—Marie Knutsen, Guro Knutsen, Marit Fiane Christensen and Lene Mykjåland—made headlines when they announced in a press release that they would not be returning to the national team due to issues the five had with the national team leadership. While the press statement never mentioned coach Bjarne Berntsen's name, it was assumed that he was instrumental in their decision to retire from the team. Siri Nordby however, denied that this was directed solely at Berntsen. The retirement, which came off in many newspapers as a boycott, created widespread media attention.

She has worked as a physical trainer for Øvrevoll Hosle IL's men's team, for whom her brother Sverre was the head coach. Her other brother, Geir Nordby, was her coach at Røa IL. After the 2012 season she retired from top-flight football, but after a few months she joined Øvrevoll Hosle IL, whose women's team hunted promotion from the Second Division.

== Honors ==
South Florida Bulls

- Conference USA champion: 1998

Røa

- League champion: 2004, 2007, 2008
- Cup champion: 2004, 2006, 2008
