= Per von Hirsch =

Norwegian jurist and civil servant

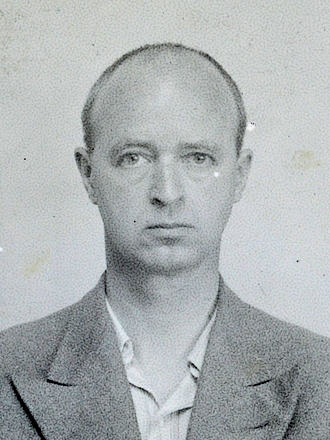

Per Einarssøn von Hirsch (26 May 1902 – 9 July 1987) was a Norwegian jurist who served as a civil servant representing Nasjonal Samling during the Second World War.

== Early life ==
He was born in Spydeberg Municipality as a son of dentist and landowner Einar Hirsch (1872–1938) and Elise née Kjos Hansen. He was a grandson of director Johan Leuthäuser Hirsch. His family eventually moved to Bærum Municipality where his father bought large properties.

== Education ==
He finished his secondary education at Fagerborg in 1921, graduated from the Norwegian Military Academy in 1924 and took the cand.jur. degree in 1928.

== Career ==
After being a junior solicitor from 1929 he opened an attorney's firm in Volda Municipality in 1931 and became manager in Hadsel Municipality in 1936. He held the military rank of lieutenant from 1924 and captain from 1931, until leaving the forces during the Second World War.

During the occupation of Norway by Nazi Germany he held different posts in Nasjonal Samling's Quisling regime; he mainly worked in the Ministry of the Interior but also served as acting County Governor of Nordland and acting permanent under-secretary of state in the Ministry of Finance. He also volunteered for Eastern Front service. Upon the death of the Minister of Finance Frederik Prytz in February 1945, Hirsch became the Minister of Finance until the war's end on 8 May 1945.

After the war, Per von Hirsch was convicted for treason and sentenced to twenty years of forced labour. He was released in 1952 to run an attorney's office in Oslo, and from 1953 to his retirement in 1969 he was a civil servant in the Norwegian Tax Directorate. He died in 1987.
