= Grini (station) =

Former Oslo metro station

General information
- Location: Grini, Bærum; Norway
- Coordinates: 59°56′58″N 10°37′48″E
- Elevation: 136.3 m (447 ft)
- Line: Røa Line
- Distance: 8.4 km (5.2 mi) from Stortinget

Construction
- Structure type: At-grade

History
- Opened: 22 December 1948
- Closed: 1995
Location

Grini is a former metro station on the Røa Line of the Oslo Metro.

The station was located between Ekraveien and Eiksmarka, and was opened when the Røa Line was extended into Bærum on 22 December 1948. It was the first station on the Røa Line located in Bærum; the line would later be extended to Lijordet (1951) and Østerås (1972). Grini station was closed as a part of the Røa Line overhaul in 1995.
