= Anton Beinset =

Norwegian politician and journalist

Anton Konrad Beinset (7 January 1894 – 16 December 1963) was a Norwegian journalist, newspaper editor, short story writer, crime fiction writer and politician.

He was born in Aukra Municipality, a son of farmers Kristian Ivarson Beinset and Marie Aukra. Beinset was journalist for Den 17de Mai from 1916 to 1927. He was chief editor of the newspaper Fædrelandsvennen 1928 to 1932, and edited Tunsberg og Horten Blad from 1933 to 1934. He also wrote short-stories for the periodical Arbeidermagasinet. From 1936 to 1958 he was political journalist for Dagbladet, except during the German occupation of Norway, when he earned his living as farm worker and fisherman. Among his books are Bak kulissone from 1924, the short-story collection Utapå øya from 1942, and the crime novel Døden går på bedehus from 1945 (co-written with Trygve Hirsch who used the pseudonym "Stein Ståle"). He was a politician for the Liberal Party, a board member of the Oslo chapter of the party, and honorary member of the party's youth organization. He was a member of the Norwegian Association for Women's Rights.
