= Einar Hirsch =

Norwegian dentist and landowner

Einar von Hirsch (5 June 1872 – 20 October 1938) was a Norwegian dentist and landowner.

He was born in Romedal Municipality as a son of director Johan Leuthäuser Hirsch (1843–1922) and his first wife Johanne P. Bolstad (1847–1930). In 1901 he married dean's daughter Elise Kjos Hansen. Their son Trygve Hirsch was a well-known barrister and writer, and another son Per von Hirsch a well-known figure during the occupation of Norway by Nazi Germany.

Einar Hirsch graduated as an agronomist in 1896 and as an odontologist in 1904. He was a prolific writer in both agricultural and odontological periodicals. From 1915 to 1921 he edited the periodicals Norsk Tannlægeforenings Tidende and Munnpleien, also chairing the Norwegian Specialized Press Association.

He was a grand proprietor, owning large farms in Lørenskog Municipality and Bærum Municipality. He is best known for buying the farm Øvre Vold in 1910. He soon started to parcel out lots, starting with the area around the farm around World War I. In 1927 he put forward the idea of establishing Norway's first gallop horse racing track at Øvre Vold. The plan was approved by the central government despite local protests, creating Øvrevoll Galoppbane. Construction was carried through between 1930 and 1932.

Also, in 1916 he bought Hamang from Ebbe Astrup. He sold it to Wilhelm Bernhard Markussen already in the summer of 1917 for 155,000 kr. Einar Hirsch died in October 1938.
