= Trygve Hirsch =

Norwegian barrister and writer

Trygve Patroclus Einarsønn von Hirsch (6 November 1912 – 9 March 1992) was a Norwegian barrister and writer.

He was born in Lørenskog as a son of landowner and dentist Einar von Hirsch (1872–1938) and Elise Jacobine Kjoss-Hansen. In 1942 he married Swedish citizen Margit Kristina Wikland.

He finished his secondary education in 1931 and graduated with the cand.jur. degree from the Royal Frederick University in 1935. He was a junior solicitor for one year before opening his own law firm in Volda in 1936. He was then deputy judge in Nordre Sunnmøre District Court in 1938 and for the stipendiary magistrate in Ålesund in 1939. He was a secretary in Riksskattestyret from 1939 to 1946, when he again opened his own law firm, this time in Oslo. From 1956 he was a barrister with access to work with Supreme Court cases.

He chaired the supervisory council of Ivarans Rederi from 1950, and became a board member in 1966. He also chaired Høka from 1967 and was a board member of IBM Norway (from 1953), Autoindustri (from 1961), Grønvold Industri (from 1964), Eckbos Legater (from 1967), Titan Co and Titania (from 1966), Forsikringsselskapet Pallas (from 1971) and the Norwegian Jockey Club.

He is best known to the general public for his criminal short stories and novels, written under the pseudonym 'Stein Staale. Novels include Cocktailmysteriet (1941), Dødstonene (1942), Åndemasken (1942) and Døden går på bedehus (1945), with Anton Beinset. With the book Detektivgjengen på sporet he also ventured into young adult fiction. He is also known for the non-fiction book Norsk presse under hakekorset, issued in 1946 together with G. Jensson.
