= Karoline Dyhre Breivang =

Norwegian handball player (born 1980)

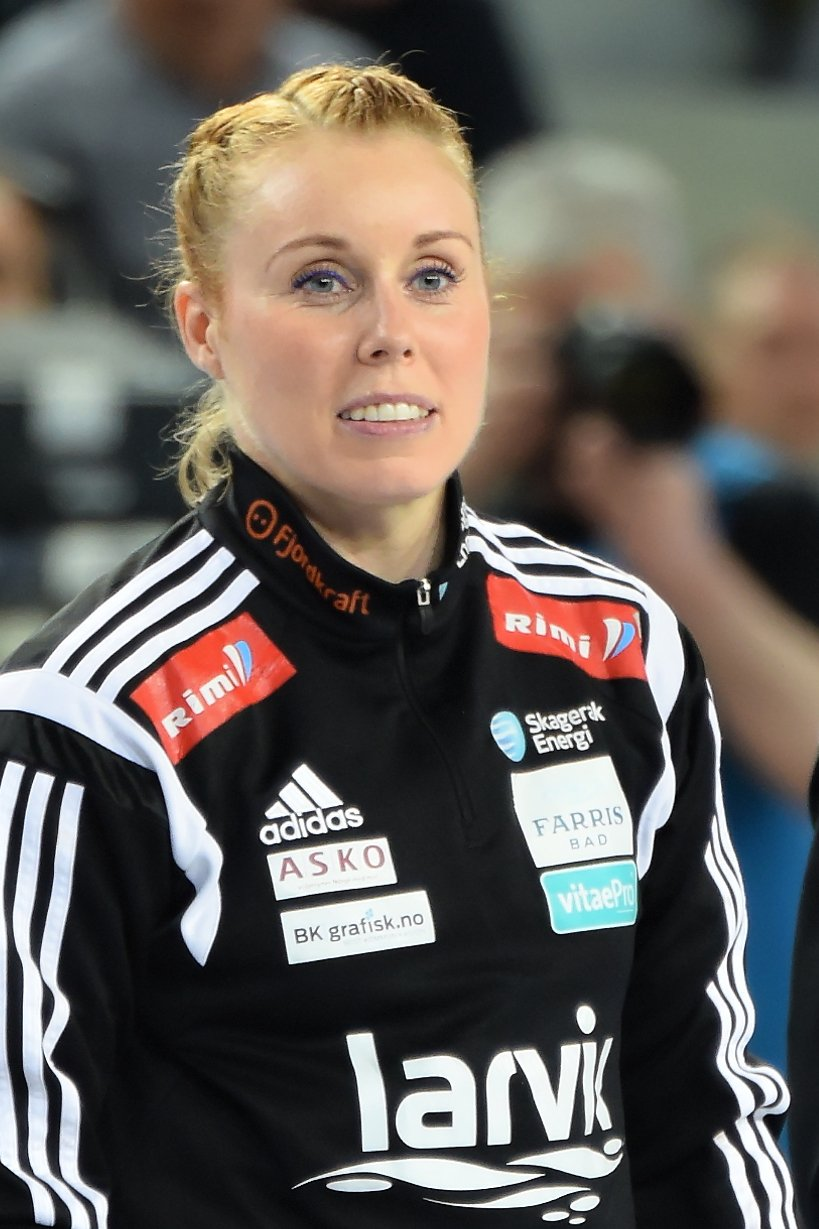
- Karoline Dyhre Breivang in 2014

Personal information
- Full name: Karoline Charlotte Dyhre Breivang
- Nationality: Norwegian
- Born: 10 May 1980 (age 46) Oslo, Norway
- Height: 1.72 m (5 ft 8 in)

Sport
- Sport: Handball
- Position: Centre back
- Current club: Retired
- Number: 8

Youth career
- Years: Team
- 1985-1995: Stabæk
- 1995-1998: Hosle IL

Senior clubs
- Years: Team
- 1998–2005: Stabæk IF
- 2005–2017: Larvik HK
National team
Years	Team	Apps	(Gls)
2000–2015	Norway	305	(475)
Medal record
Representing Norway
Olympic Games
Gold medal – first place	2008 Beijing	Team
Gold medal – first place	2012 London	Team
World Championship
Gold medal – first place	2011 Brazil	Team
Silver medal – second place	2007 France	Team
Bronze medal – third place	2009 China	Team
European Championship
Gold medal – first place	2004 Hungary	Team
Gold medal – first place	2006 Sweden	Team
Gold medal – first place	2008 Macedonia	Team
Gold medal – first place	2010 Denmark/Norway	Team
Gold medal – first place	2014 Croatia/Hungary	Team
Silver medal – second place	2012 Serbia	Team

Karoline Charlotte Dyhre Breivang (born 10 May 1980) is a retired Norwegian handball player. She is a double Olympic gold medalist, a world champion and five time European champion.

== Career ==
=== Club career ===
Breivang started playing handball at the age of 4 at Stabæk. Aged 15 she joined Hosle IL. After three years she returned to Stabæk, where she made her senior debut at the age of 18.

In 2005 she left Stabæk and joined Larvik HK. Here she won the Norwegian championship 11 times in row from 2005–06 to 2016–17. In 2008 she won the EHF Cup Winners' Cup and in 2011 she won the Champions League.

Between the fall of 2016 and February 2017 she took a break from handball due to pregnancy leave. After the 2016–17 season she retired.

=== National team ===
Breivang made her debut on the Norwegian national team in 2000. She was called in as Kjersti Grini was injured just before the 2000 European Championship. she played 305 matches (a former Norwegian record) and scored 475 goals. She retired from the national team in 2015.

She previously had the record for most games for the Norwegian national team, until she was overtaken by Katrine Lunde on 19 March 2021.

=== Awards and recognition ===
She was awarded the Håndballstatuetten trophy from the Norwegian Handball Federation in 2019.

== Private ==
Breivang comes from a family of handball players. Both of her parents, both of her younger brothers have also played handball and her mother has worked in the Norwegian Handball Federation. She has a degree in economics.
