= Eiksmarka (station) =

Oslo metro station

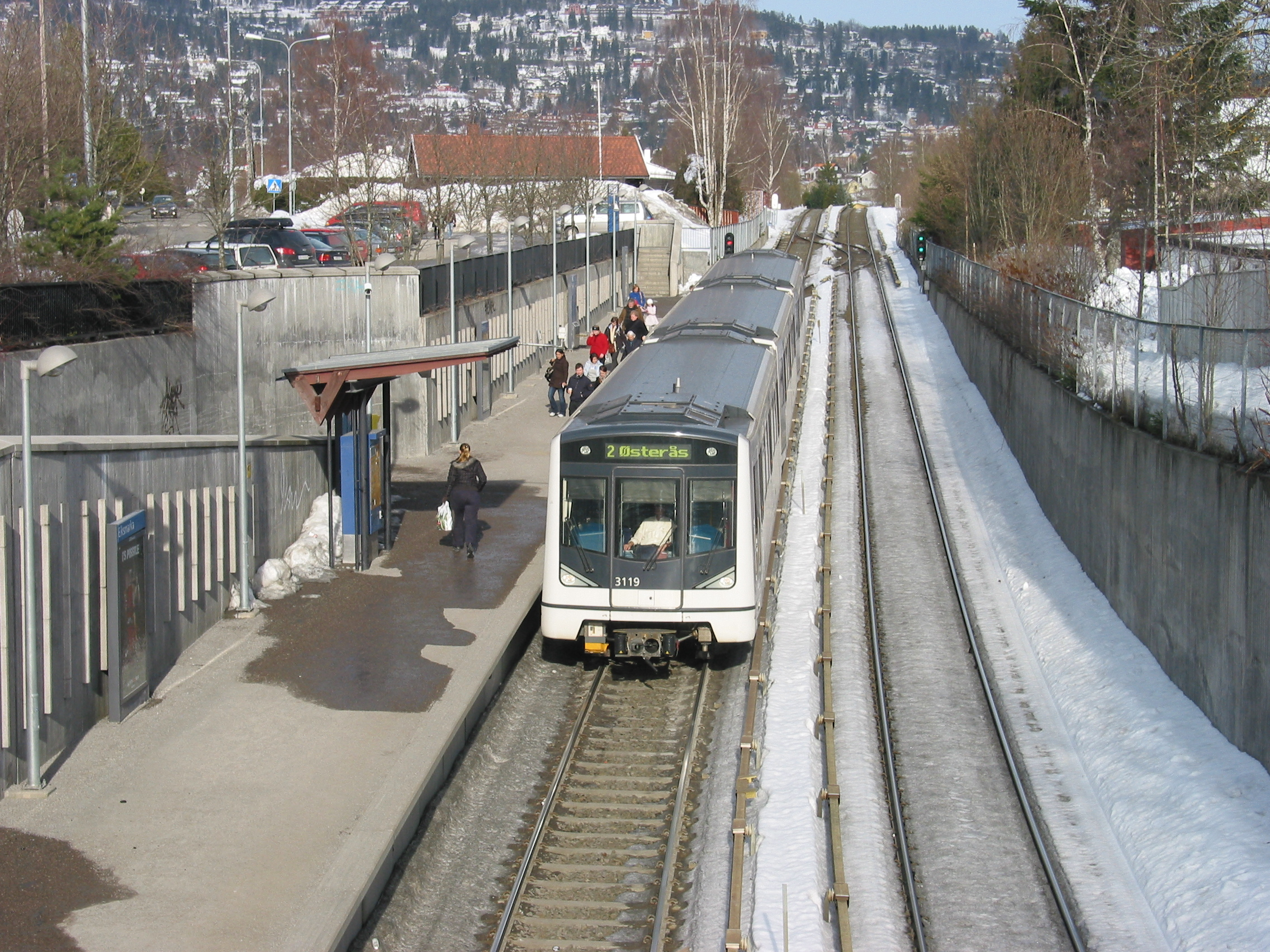
- MX3000 bound for Østerås unloading at Eiksmarka.

General information
- Location: Eiksmarka, Bærum; Norway
- Coordinates: 59°56′48″N 10°37′20″E
- Elevation: 138.5 m (454 ft)
- Owner: Sporveien
- Operator: Sporveien T-banen
- Line: Røa Line
- Distance: 8.9 km (5.5 mi) from Stortinget

Construction
- Structure type: At-grade
- Accessible: Yes

History
- Opened: 3 December 1951
Location

Eiksmarka is a station on the Røa Line of the Oslo Metro. It is located between Ekraveien and Lijordet, 8.9 km from Stortinget.

The station was opened in 1951 as part of the extension to Lijordet. After the closing of Grini in 1995, it is the first of three stations on the Røa Line within Bærum municipality. The station serves northwestern Bærum, including Eiksmarka and Fossum; to the north of the station is the Eiksmarka school.

The station was the site of a murder in 2002 when a 22-year-old Ethiopian woman was stabbed to death by her husband.

Preceding station	Oslo Metro	Following station
Lijordet towards Østerås	Line 2	Ekraveien towards Ellingsrudåsen
