= Volvat (station) =

Former Oslo metro station

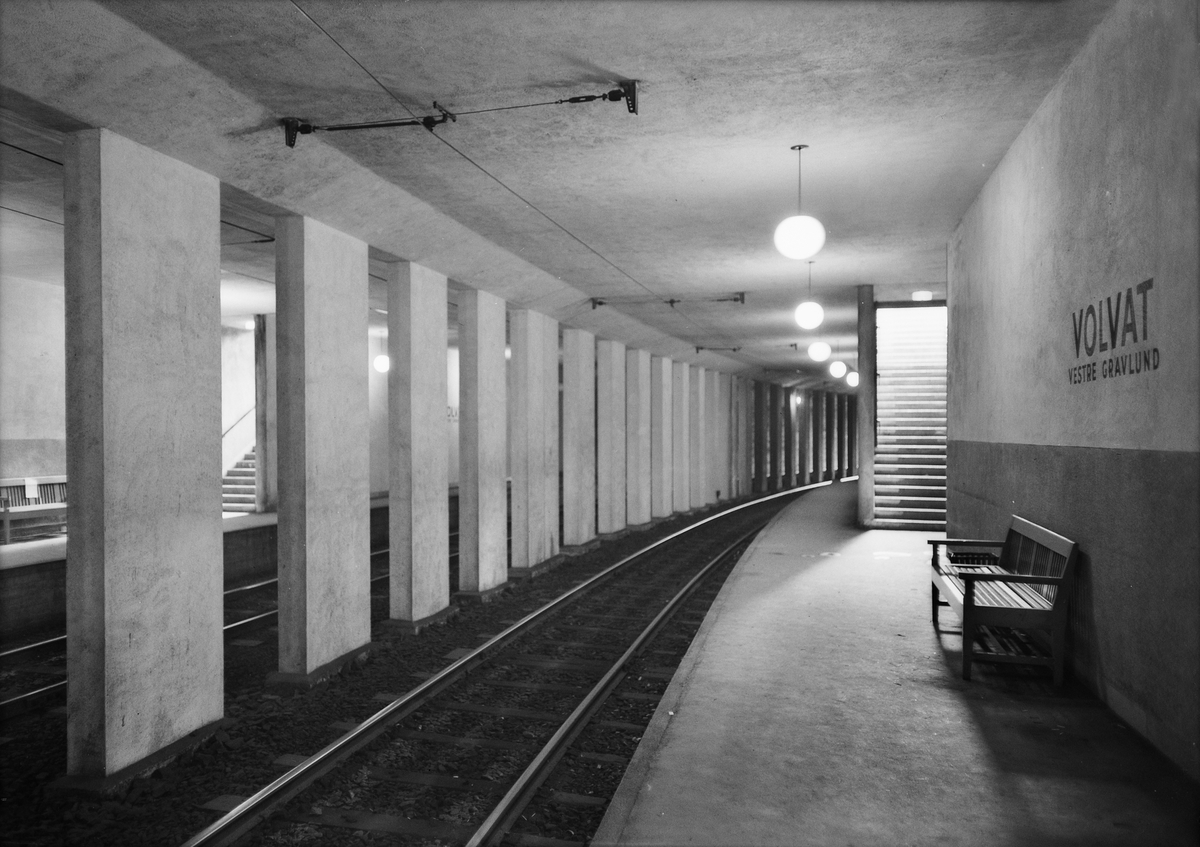
- The station around 1955

General information
- Location: Volvat, Oslo; Norway
- Coordinates: 59°55′59″N 10°42′15″E
- Elevation: 52.3 m (172 ft)
- Line: Røa Line
- Distance: 3.4 km from Stortinget

Construction
- Structure type: Underground

History
- Opened: 7 November 1912
- Closed: 7 April 1997
Location

Volvat was a rapid transit station of the Oslo Metro's Røa Line and Kolsås Line. Situated in the neighborhood of Volvat in Vestre Aker borough of Oslo, Norway, it was the sole underground station on the western part of the metro. It was located 3.4 kilometers (2.1 mi) from Stortinget.

The station opened on 7 November 1912 at ground level, located at the level crossing with Sørkedalsveien. Due to increasing traffic, the line was placed in a culvert under the road in 1939. Trains along the Røa Line stopped calling at the station from 5 February 1995, since that line was upgraded to longer trains. The same happened with the Kolsås Line from 7 April 1997, after which the station was closed. The operated deemed the cost of upgrading the station not to be worth it.

== History ==
Volvat took its name from pharmacist Harald Thaulow (1815–81), who owned the farm during his lifetime. The name is a slight simplification of his surname backwards. From the 1900s the area was regulated for housing, making it an interesting site for the tram company Akersbanerne. The Røa Line past Volvat opened on 7 November 1912, and a station was built at ground level av Volvat.

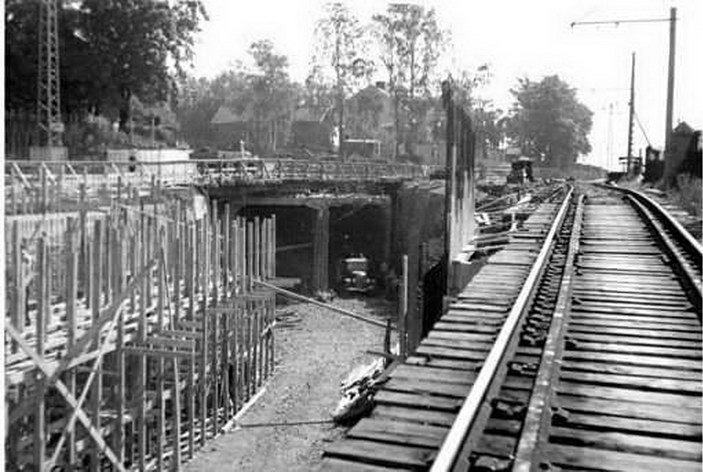
From the construction of the tunnel and underground station

Volvat was the site of a level crossing between the metro and Sørkedalsveien. This eventually created difficulties for the road traffic and Holmenkolbanen therefore decided to build an underground section of line part of the way between Volvat and Majorstuen. The new station opened in 1939. This remained the only underground station west of the Common Tunnel until after the station closed.

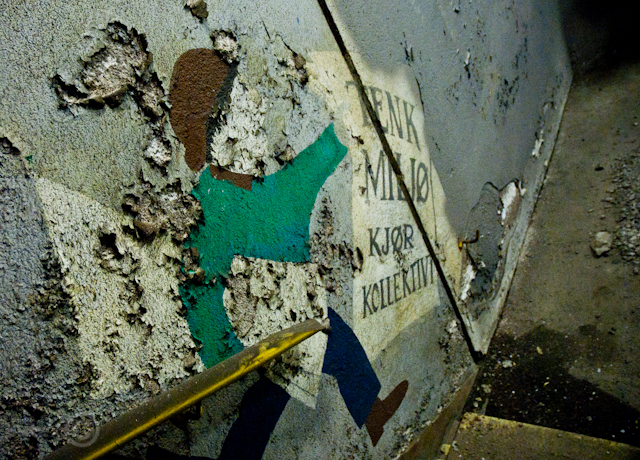
Remains of a mural at Volvat, August 2011

The connection of the eastern and western metro network in the early 1990s meant that the Røa Line was to be upgrades to metro standard. This meant that platforms were to be extended to 110 meters (360 ft) to allow six-car metro trains. In addition to a complete renovation of the tracks, this meant that the overhead wires were replaced with a third rail. The Kolsås Line would for the mean-time be retained with the old system. The upgraded Røa Line started using three-car trains, while two-car trains continued to run to Kolsås. Oslo Sporveier concluded that the tunnel did not make it worthwhile to expand the platforms. From 5 February 1995 the station was therefore only served by trains along the Kolsås Line. The station was closed on 7 April 1997, when three-car trains started running on the Kolsås Line.

== Facilities ==
Volvat was an underground rapid transit station situated on the Røa Line, 3.4 kilometers (2.1 mi) from Stortinget in the city center. Volvat was located at the intersection between the metro line and Sørkedalsveien. It featured two side platforms, each long enough for two-car trains.

== Biography ==
- Aspenberg, Nils Carl (1995). Neste stopp Makrellbekken: historien om Røabanen. Oslo: Baneforlaget. ISBN 82-91448-18-3.
