= Lijordet (station) =

Oslo metro station

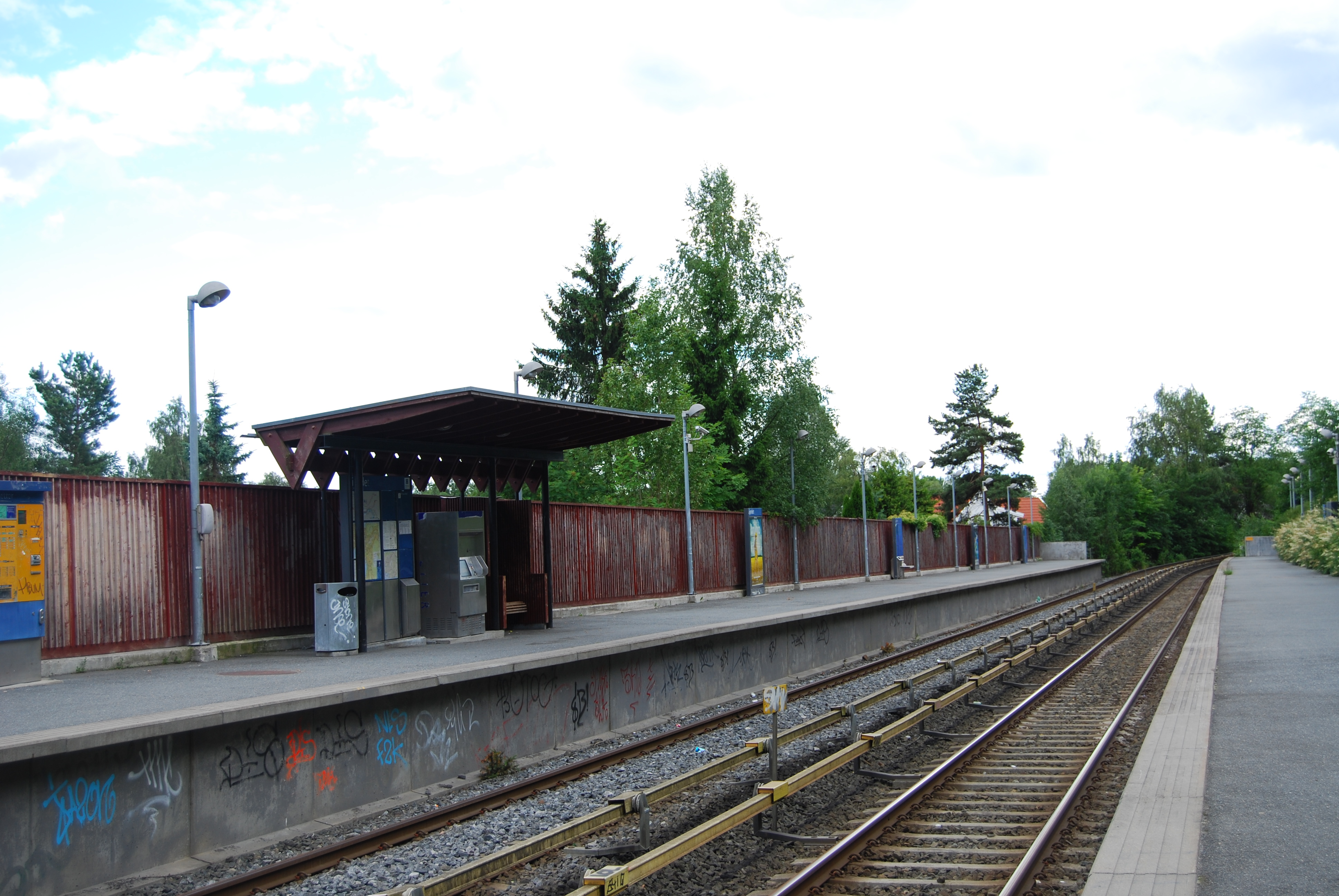

General information
- Location: Øvrevoll, Bærum; Norway
- Coordinates: 59°56′27″N 10°36′59″E
- Elevation: 123.2 m (404 ft)
- Owner: Sporveien
- Operator: Sporveien T-banen
- Line: Røa Line
- Distance: 9.6 km (6.0 mi) from Stortinget

Construction
- Structure type: At-grade
- Accessible: Yes

History
- Opened: 3 December 1951
Location

Lijordet is a station on the Røa Line of the Oslo Metro. It is located between Østerås and Eiksmarka, 9.6 km from Stortinget. It is the second of three stations on the Røa Line within Bærum municipality.

The station was opened in 1951 when Røabanen was expanded from Grini to Lijordet.

Preceding station	Oslo Metro	Following station
Østerås Terminus	Line 2	Eiksmarka towards Ellingsrudåsen
