= Røa Gjerdefabrikk =

Norwegian manufacturing company

Coordinates: 59.9846°N 10.9443°E

Logo.

Røa Gjerdefabrikk (Urban East Norwegian: [ˈrø̀ːɑ ˈjæ̂ːrəfɑˌbrɪkː]) is a manufacturing company based in Vestre Aker, Oslo, Norway.

It was founded in 1954 by Bjørn Berg Larsen, and bought by Arne Austad in 1985. The manufacturing facilities have always been located at Woxen farm near Bogstad, and the company also runs a shop there. Its products are fences, gates, alarm and surveillance equipment.
