= Eiksmarka =

- Village
- Location in Akershus
- Coordinates: 59°56′48″N 10°37′20″E
- Country: Norway
- Region: Østlandet
- County: Akershus
- Municipality: Bærum
- Time zone: UTC+01:00 (CET)
  - Summer (DST): UTC+02:00 (CEST)

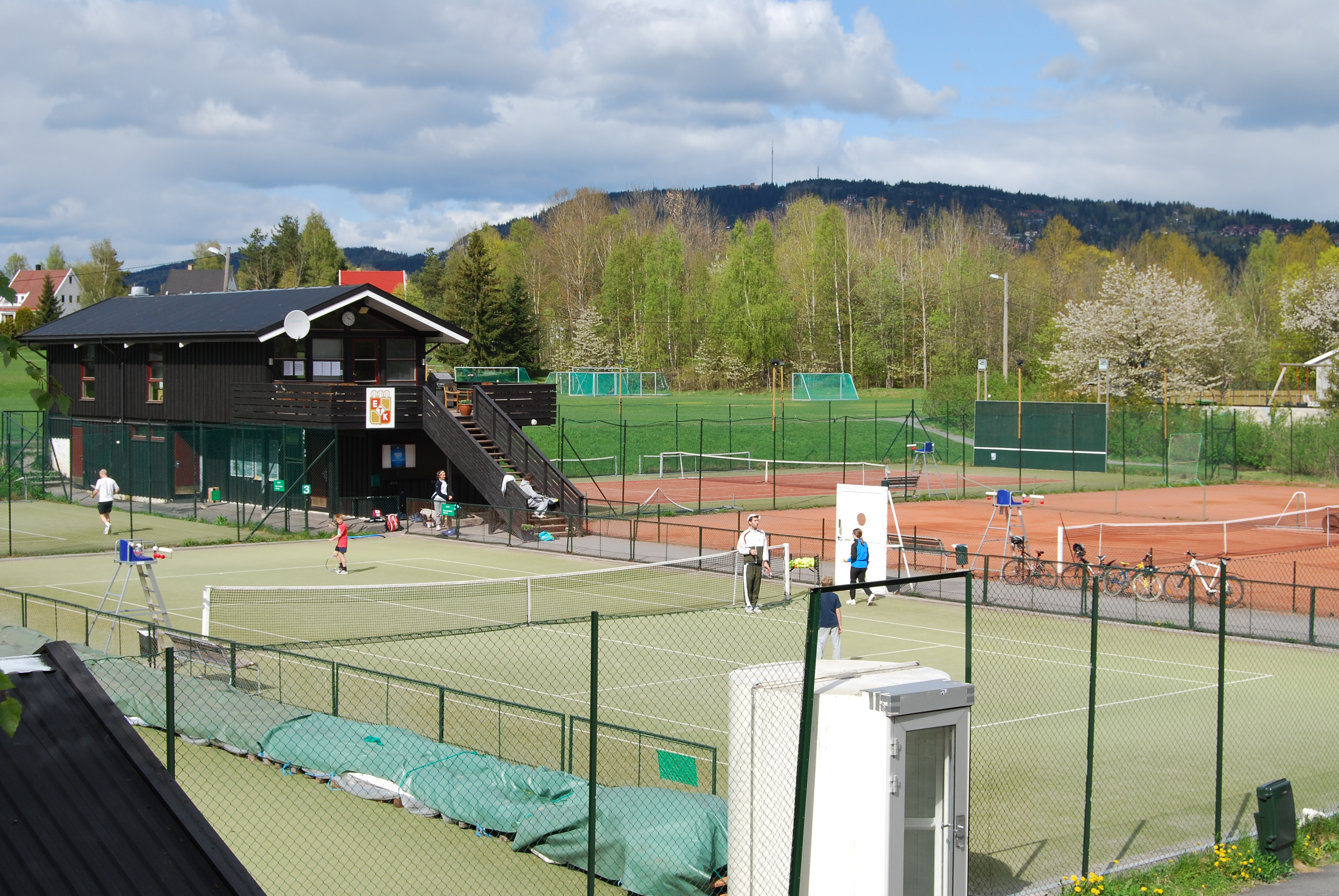
Eiksmarka Tennis Courts

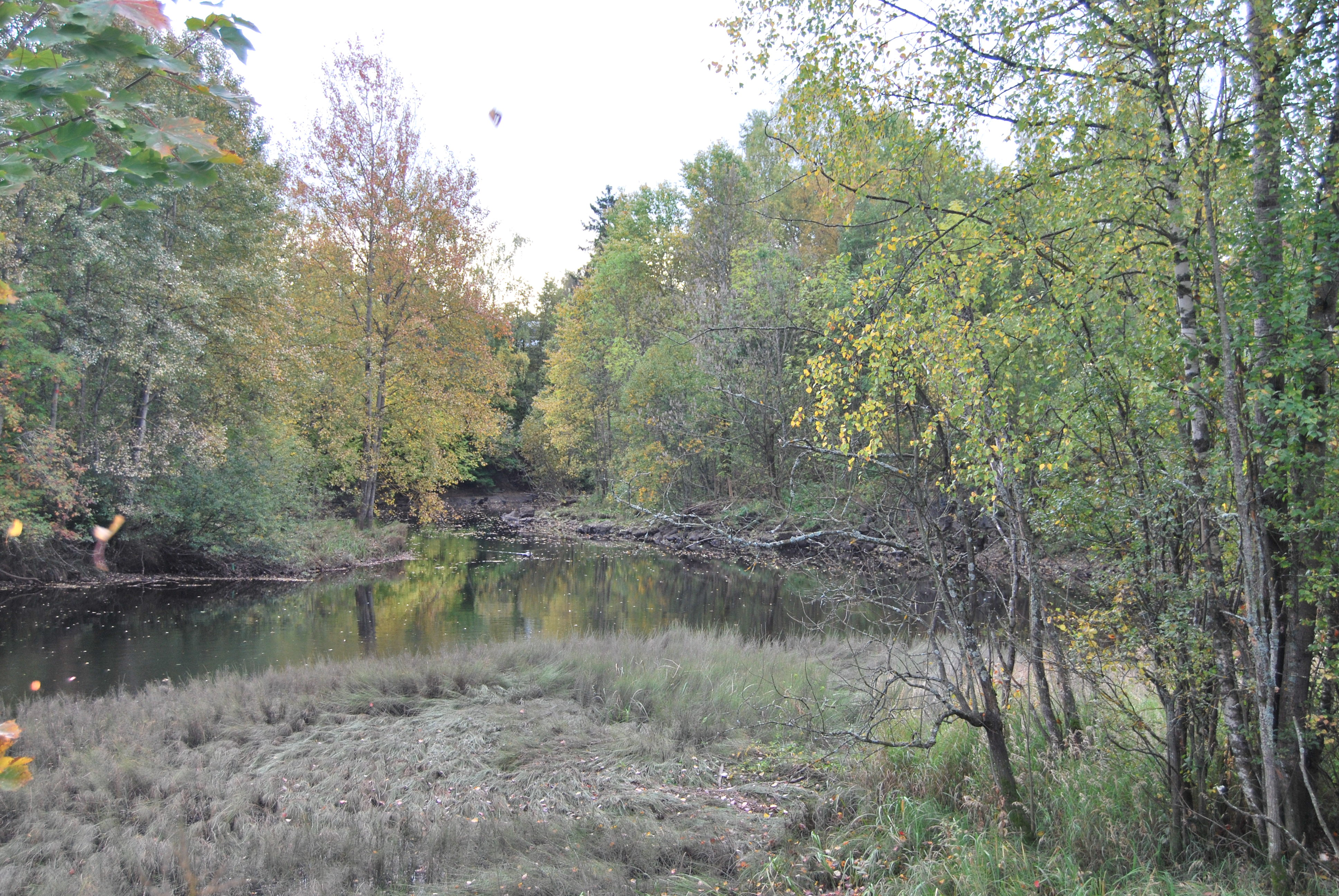
The Lysaker River marks the border between Eiksmarka and the Oslo West End borough of Røa

Eiksmarka ("Oakfield") is an affluent suburb of the Norwegian municipality of Bærum in the Greater Oslo Region with around 4,000 inhabitants. It is located just west of the border of Oslo municipality, but within the contiguous urban area of Oslo as well as within the Diocese of Oslo. It is served by Eiksmarka station of the Oslo Metro as well as bus lines.

The area consists almost exclusively of private villas, with the exception of the central area near Eiksmarka station, known as Eiksmarka Centre. The latter includes an underground supermarket and a number of specialty shops, including a bakery, a delicatessen, a sushi bar, a flower shop, a pharmacy, clothing stores, a bookstore and a hairdresser, as well as certain public and private offices and a number of upmarket residential apartments. An elementary school, Eiksmarka skole, a kindergarten, a public library and a tennis court are located adjacent to Eiksmarka Centre.

Eiksmarka borders the borough of Jar to the south, and belongs to the eastern part of Bærum, commonly regarded as the priciest and most fashionable residential area of Norway. A narrow green belt (approx. 100–200 meters) with the Lysaker River separates Eiksmarka from the Oslo West End borough of Røa on the eastern side of the river. Eiksmarka's northwestern border is also the border of the urban area; the area to the north of Eiksmarka and Røa consists of golf courses, fields and forests.

Eiksmarka is known for good golfing, tennis and horse riding, and for its many green areas. The population are among the most affluent and most highly educated in the country. From 2008 to 2011, Eiksmarka had the only Norwegian restaurant outside Oslo with one star in the Michelin Guide. The only gallop racecourse in Norway, Øvrevoll Galloppbane, is located between Eiksmarka and Jar.

The name Eiksmarka is translated as Oakfield; (Note: The word eik means oak while the word marka is a definite form of the word mark, from Old Norse mǫrk, meaning land, ground or field. The -s is an interfix that serves to combine the words into a compound word (in Norwegian called a fuge-s).) the local school, Eiksmarka skole, for example has translated its name as Oakfield Elementary and published the Oakfield Times in connection with English teaching.

As of 2014, properties are typically sold for between 1 and 3 million USD, with some villas being sold for as much as 5 million USD.

The travel time between Eiksmarka and Nationaltheatret in the central city district of Oslo is 16 minutes with the Oslo Metro line.
