= Røa =

Neighbourhood in Oslo, Norway

Coordinates: 59°57′N 10°39′E

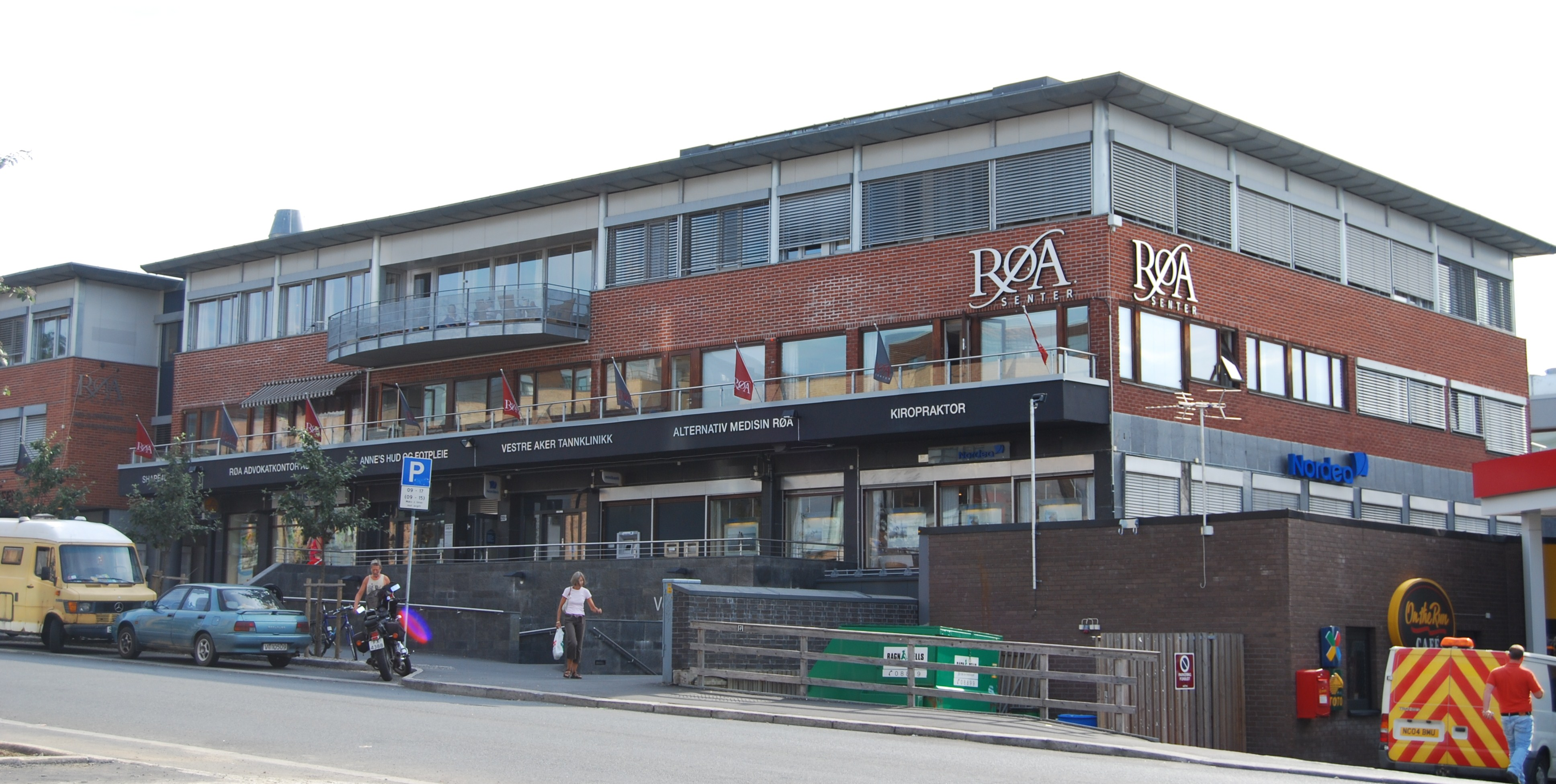
Røa shopping centre

Røa (Norwegian pronunciation: [ˈrø̀ːɑ]) is a neighbourhood and a former administrative borough of the city of Oslo, Norway. In 2004 the borough of Røa was merged with neighbouring Vinderen to become Vestre Aker borough.

Røa is a suburb of Oslo, located approximately 7 kilometers away from downtown Oslo. Most of Røa consists of single-family detached home and duplex houses. Its centre has been heavily urbanized in recent years, with shopping centres, offices and apartment blocks. Røa is served by the Røa Line, which takes 11 minutes to Majorstuen and 13 minutes to Nationaltheatret in downtown Oslo.

== See also ==
- Røa Gjerdefabrikk
- Røa IL
