= Hosle =

Coordinates: 59°56′06″N 10°34′50″E

- Village
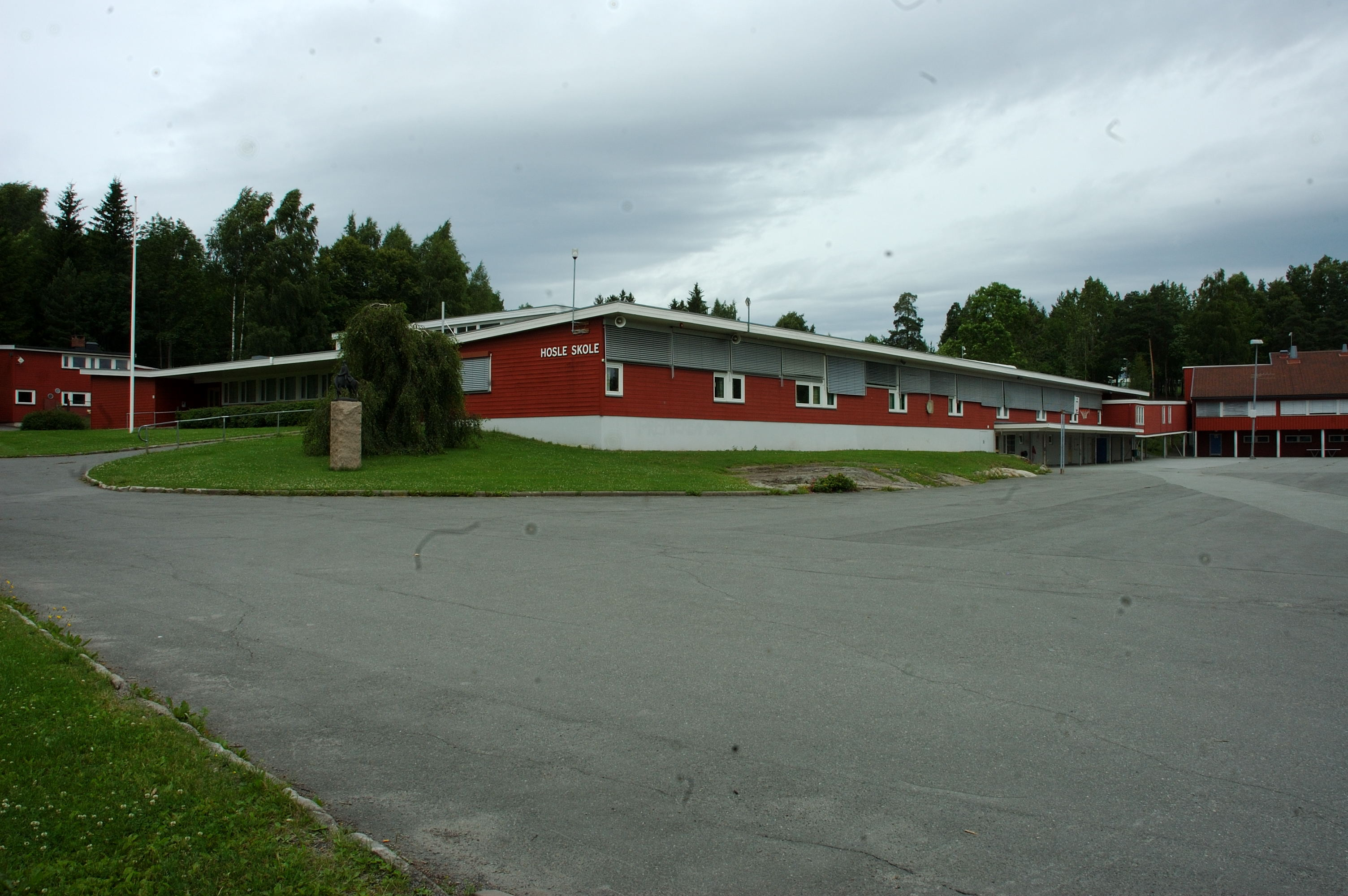
- Hosle Primary School

- Location in Akershus
- Country: Norway
- Region: Østlandet
- County: Akershus
- Time zone: UTC+01:00 (CET)
  - Summer (DST): UTC+02:00 (CEST)

Hosle is a district in the municipality of Bærum, Norway. Its population (as of 2007) is 5,713.

== Bus Routes to Hosle ==
140 Bekkestua-Skøyen
140E Hosle-Nationaltheatret
212 Bekkestua-Bekkestua
