= Østerås =

- Village
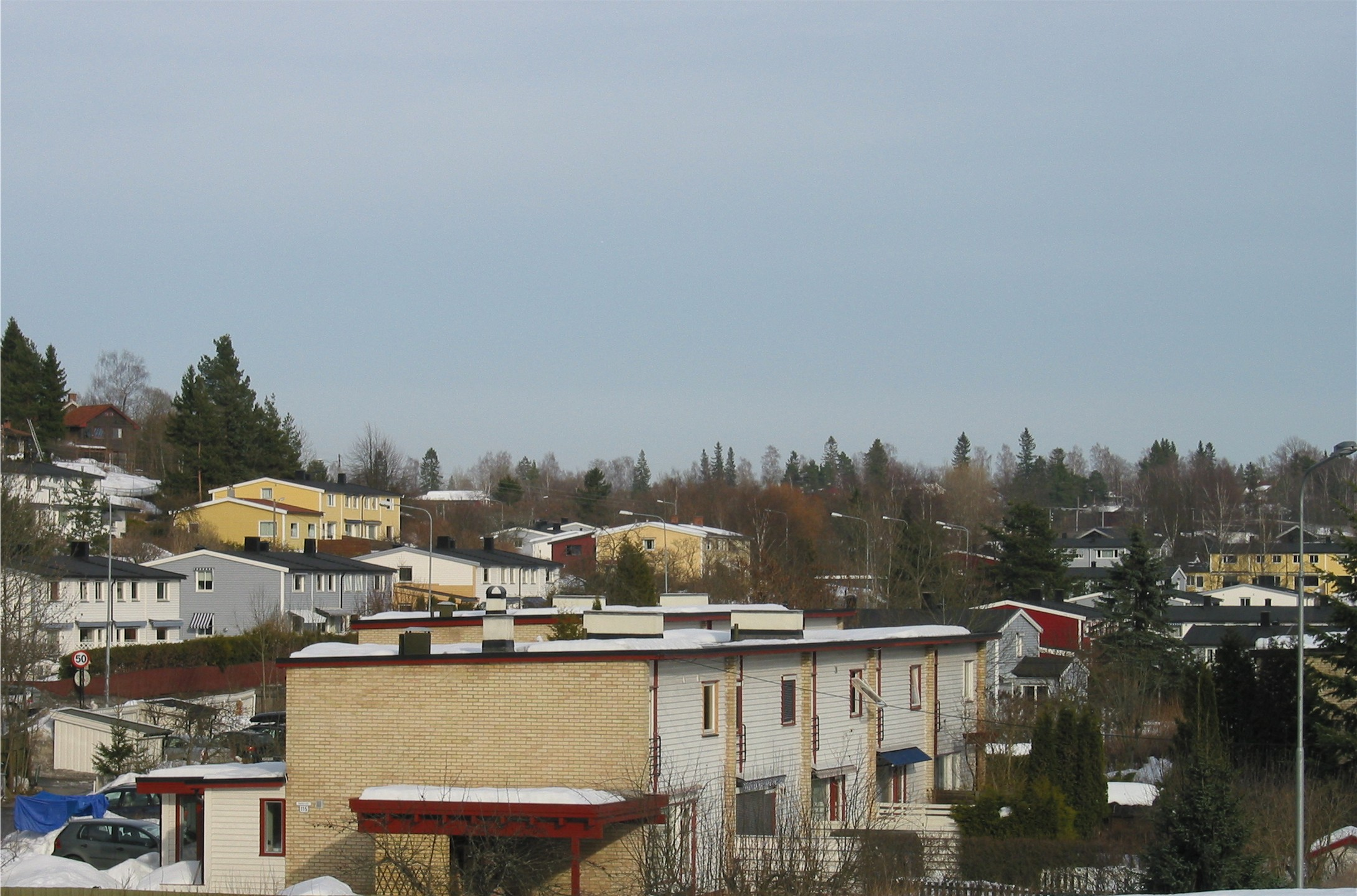
- Housing near the bus station Nordveien, Østerås

- Location in Akershus
- Coordinates: 59°56′31″N 10°36′27″E
- Country: Norway
- Region: Østlandet
- County: Akershus
- Municipality: Bærum
- Time zone: UTC+01:00 (CET)
  - Summer (DST): UTC+02:00 (CEST)

Østerås is a village in Akershus, Norway. Østerås (station) the west end station of the Oslo Metro line 2, which is also known as the Østerås metro line.

== Shopping ==
Østerås shopping mall was opened in 1968 and consists of 25 stores and agencies, including grocery store, gym, jewelry, pharmacy, masseuse, doctors office, and dentist.

== See also ==
- Østerås kjøpesenter
