= Lysaker Bridge =

Bridge in Norway

Coordinates: 59.9133°N 10.6408°E

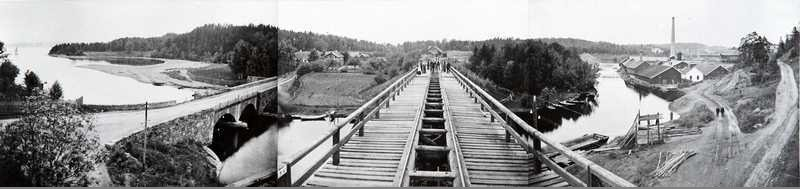
Lysaker Bridge in 1890

The Lysaker Bridge (Norwegian: Lysakerbrua or Lysakerbroen) is a road bridge between Sollerud in Oslo and Lysaker in Bærum.

A road bridge has existed on the same location, at the outflux of the river Lysakerelva into Lysakerfjorden, for several hundred years. Lysaker became a traffic hub between the capital Oslo and its western surroundings after the Kongsberg Silver Mines were opened in 1624. In 1716, during the Great Northern War, it was the site of a Dano-Norwegian bombardment of Swedish troops who tried to cross the bridge.

A modern road (Drammensveien) was finished in 1859. In 1872 the Drammen Line railroad was constructed, creating its own bridge at the same location.

On the night between 13 and 14 April 1940 the bridge was the site of the Lysaker Bridge sabotage, arguably the first act of sabotage in Norway during World War II.

In August 1920 a traffic count put the number of private cars at 950. There were also 207 trucks, 227 motorbikes, 728 bikes, 365 caravans, 22 horse riders and 2,958 pedestrians. Today, only motorized vehicles are allowed as the bridge has become a part of European route E18.

Located on the border between the capital Oslo and the largest commuter district Bærum, the Lysaker Bridge has been vital to the rapidly expanding post-WWII car commuting in Greater Oslo. In 1990 it had an annual average daily traffic of about 100,000 cars, and was as such Norway's most trafficked bridge. This number had been about 10,000 in the late 1940s and 67,000 in 1970. In the 2000s the car count had risen to 170,000.

In 1961 the road was expanded to four lanes, two in each direction. Another major expansion followed in 1980. From March to June 1990 the bridge underwent another expansion from six to seven lanes, to the cost of 8 million kr.
