= No. 330 Squadron RNoAF =

- Emblem
- Active: 25 April 1941–21 November 1945; 1953-1958; 1962-1968; 1973-present
- Branch: Royal Norwegian Air Force
- Role: Search and rescue
- Part of: 130th Air Wing
- Garrison/HQ: Sola Air Station

Aircraft flown
- Fighter: F-84G (1953–58)
- Helicopter: Sea King (1973–current); AW101 (2020-)
- Patrol: N-3PB (1941–43); Catalina (1942–43); Sunderland (1943–45); Albatross (1962–68)

No. 330 Squadron RNoAF (Norwegian: 330 skvadron) is a helicopter unit of the Royal Norwegian Air Force (RNoAF) and is Norway's military search and rescue service. The squadron operates sixteen AugustaWestland AW101 helicopters based at six airbases along the coast. Headquartered at Sola Air Station, the squadron has detachments at Rygge, Florø, Ørland, Bodø and Banak. The unit's primary duty is search and rescue (SAR), with secondary duties consisting of air ambulance and disaster relief.

The squadron has its roots in the No. 330 Squadron RAF, which conducted maritime surveillance, Arctic convoy escort and anti-submarine warfare during the Second World War. It was established on Iceland on 25 April 1941, where it operated Northrop N-3PB and Consolidated PBY Catalina seaplanes. It relocated to RAF Oban in Scotland on 23 January 1943 and adopted Short Sunderland flying boats in the same role. It relocated to Sola in June 1945, where it operated mostly as an airline until December, when it was deactivated.

The unit was reactivated between 20 July 1953 and 5 July 1958 to operate the Republic F-84G Thunderjet fighters, first based at Gardermoen Air Station and from 1956 at Rygge. It was again reactivated from 1 March 1962 to 1 October 1968 to carry out maritime surveillance and anti-submarine operations from Sola, using the Grumman HU-16 Albatross. In its current role the squadron became operational in 1973, using ten, later twelve Sea Kings. These have been replaced with the AgustaWestland AW101.

== Operations ==
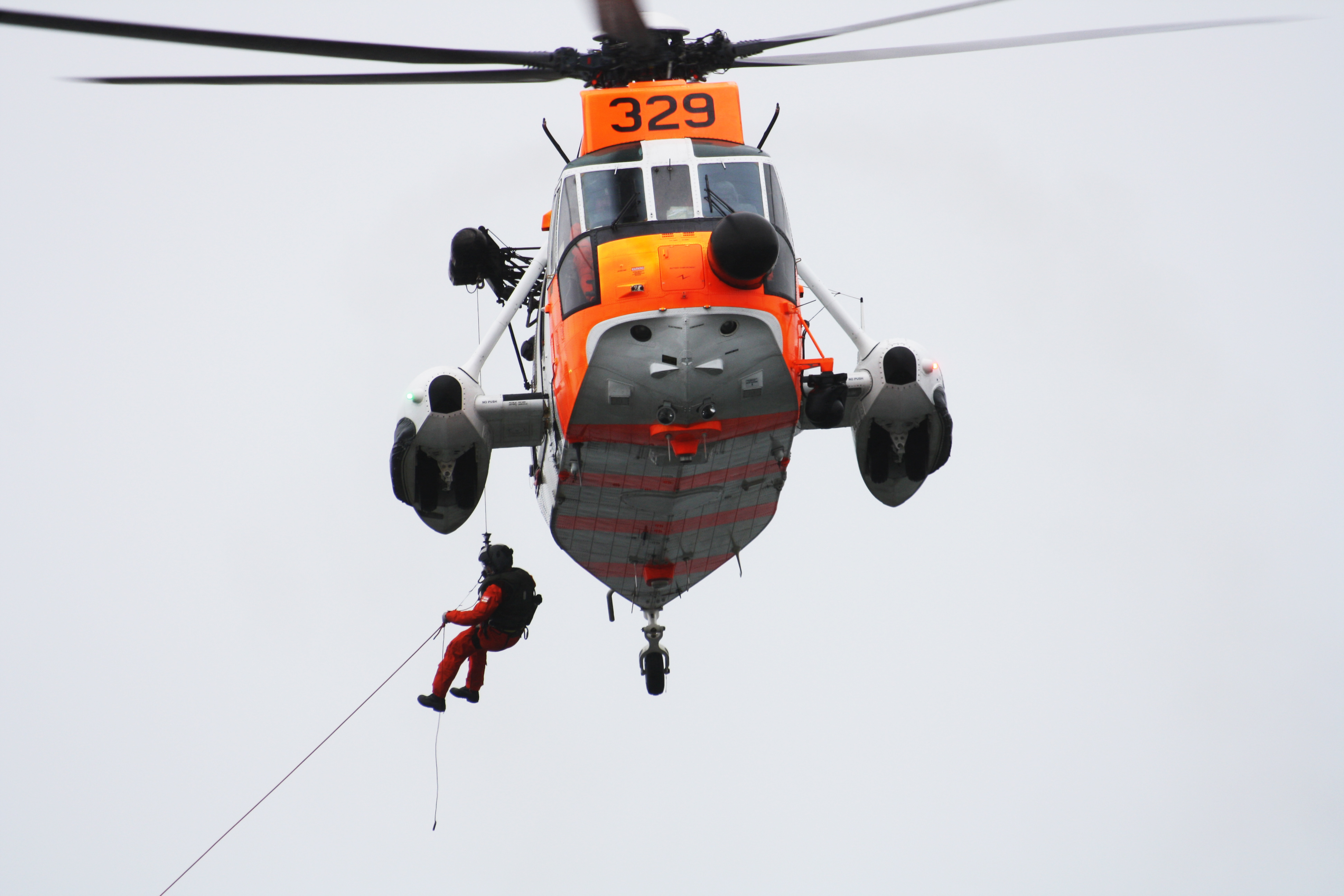
Rescue swimmer being hoisted from the Sea King

The 330 Squadron is part of the Rescue Helicopter Service of the Royal Norwegian Air Force. It is based at Sola Air Station, with detachments at Florø, Ørland, Bodø, Rygge and Banak. The unit's primary role is search and rescue. The squadron is funded through a cooperation between the Ministry of Defence, the Ministry of Justice and Public Security and the Ministry of Health and Social Affairs. Operationally the squadron is under the command of the Joint Rescue Coordination Centre of Southern Norway (JRCCoSN) and the Joint Rescue Coordination Centre of Northern Norway (JRCCoNN), respectively. Norway has signed agreements with Denmark, Sweden, Finland, Iceland, the United Kingdom and Russia which under given circumstances may result in the 330 Squadron operating within these countries' territories.

The squadron operates sixteen AugustaWestland AW101 helicopters. Two are located on each base at any given time, Up to two helicopters are on long-term maintenance at any time. At all bases at least one of the helicopters is on stand-by at any time. The Florø base was operated by the civilian contractor CHC Helikopter Service until the new AW101 helicopters arrived

The helicopters are manned by two pilots, a systems operator, a navigator, a technician/lift operator, a rescue swimmer and an anaesthesiologist. Five of these are military personnel, while the anaesthesiologists work for the local health trust and are funded through them.

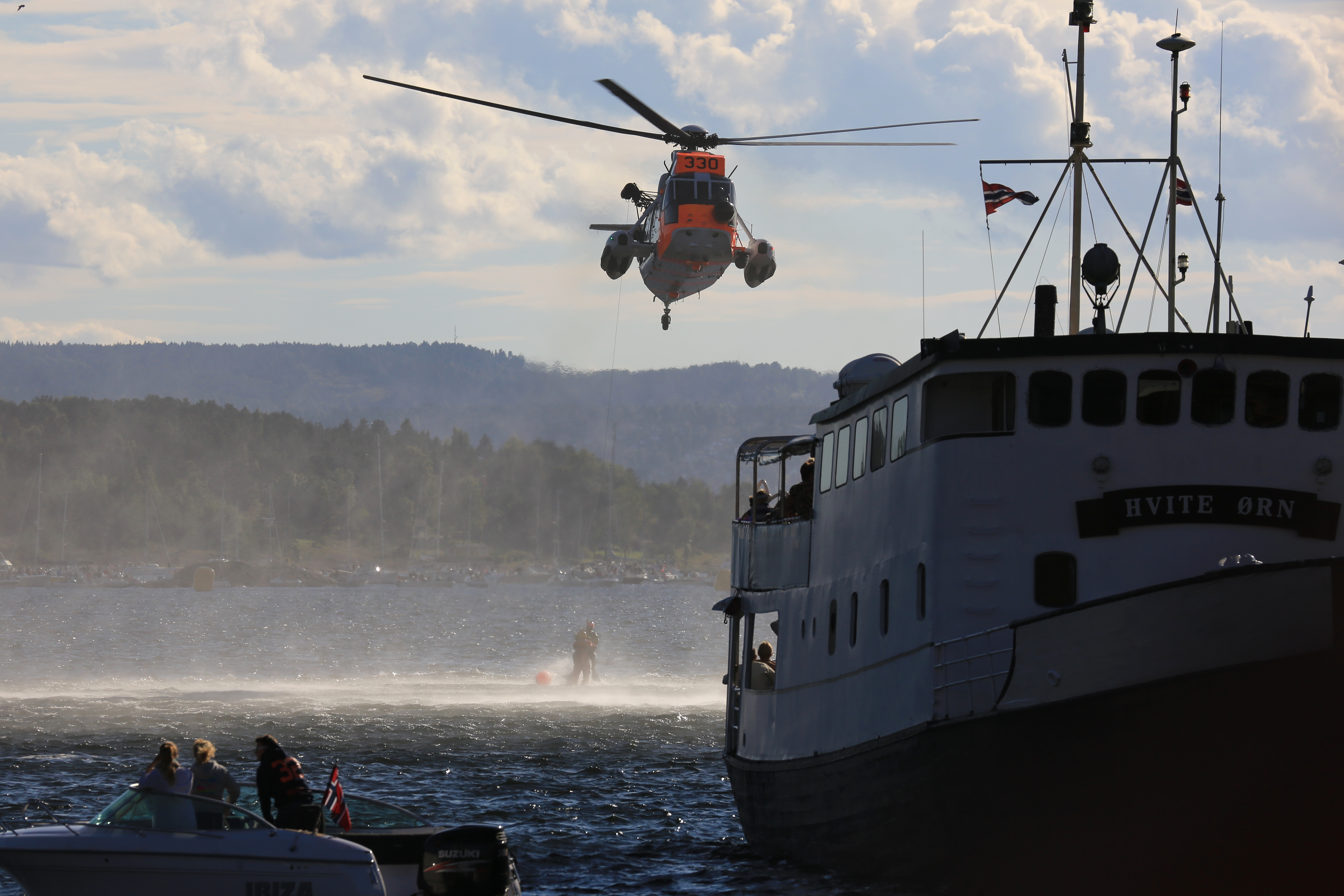
A demonstration of a rescue

The Sea Kings fly a combined 4,500 hours per year. Half of these are used for missions, the remainder for training. Because the unit operates under military rules, it has a stricter training regime than civilian operators. It can also operate under more severe weather conditions. The bases have on-call rooms and a crew on duty at all times. The squadron aims as an average scrambling time of 15 minutes; this varies between 10 and 25 minutes depending on the time of day, the layout of the base and preparations.

The 330 Squadron is part of the National Air Ambulance Service. It carries out about 800 missions per year, or about ten percent of the total helicopter ambulance missions in Norway. The unit's helicopters are used when the ordinary helicopter ambulances (Eurocopter EC135, EC145 and AgustaWestland AW139) are unable to operate due to weather; missions in which a large cabin is needed such as due to the number of patients or an incubator; and in areas where the Sea Kings are closer and areas where there is no ordinary air ambulance service. Ambulance use must be permitted by the JRCCs.

When not used for SAR missions, the Sea Kings may be used for auxiliary and transport missions within the armed forces, assisting the Norwegian Police Service, aerial firefighting and anti-pollution.

== Bases ==
Locations of 330 Squadron bases

The following is a list of bases used by the 330 Sqn. It denotes the period they were in use, the medical provider, the number of missions and flight-hours in 2013.

Bases
Base	Period	Medical	Missions	Hours	Refs
Ålesund Airport, Vigra	1995–98	Møre og Romsdal County Municipality	—	—	
Station Group Banak	1973–	Finnmark Hospital Trust	230	744	
Bodø Main Air Station	1973–	Nordland Hospital Trust	323	761	
Florø Airport	2009–	Førde Hospital Trust	149	476	
Ørland Main Air Station	1973–	Norsk Luftambulanse/St. Olav's Hospital Trust	239	726	
Rygge Air Station	1999–	Oslo University Hospital	225	607	
Sola Air Station	1973–	Stavanger Hospital Trust	225	850	

=== Iceland ===
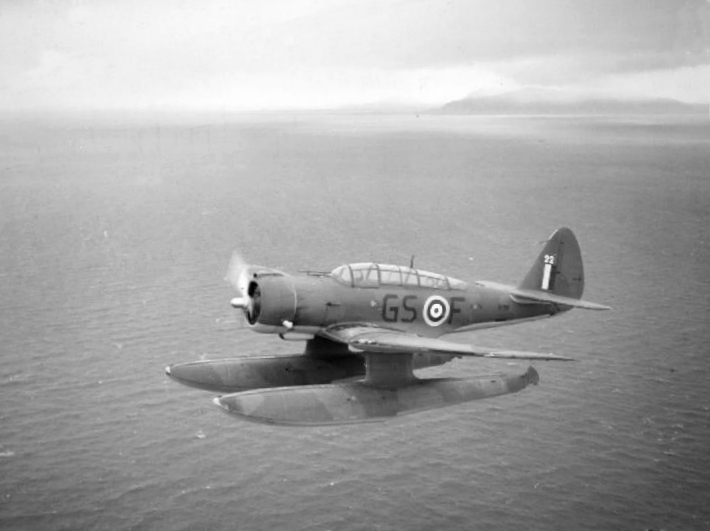
One of the Northrop N-3PB torpedo bombers of 330 Squadron

The Royal Norwegian Navy Air Service ordered twelve Northrop N-3PB Nomads on 12 March 1940. This was the first-ever order for Northrop Corporation. By the time the first aircraft was finished in December 1940, Germany had invaded Norway. The aircraft were therefore transferred to Little Norway in Toronto, Ontario, Canada. During late fall the Norwegian Nygaardsvold's Cabinet agreed with the Royal Air Force that the exiled Norwegian forces could use the Northrops to operate reconnaissance and escort services around Iceland.

The 330 (Norwegian) Squadron was activated on 25 April 1941 and based at RAF Reykjavik, also known as Corbett Camp, in the vicinity of Reykjavík on Iceland. The squadron originally consisted of 128 men, all Norwegian. These had various backgrounds: 80 were trained at Little Norway; most of the rest were sailors from sunken ships or men brought in from Lofoten during the Operation Claymore raid. These lacked military training, forcing the squadron to establish a recruit school. The base consisted of a dozen Nissen huts. The facilities were primitive and the soldiers forced to sleep on the muddy ground.

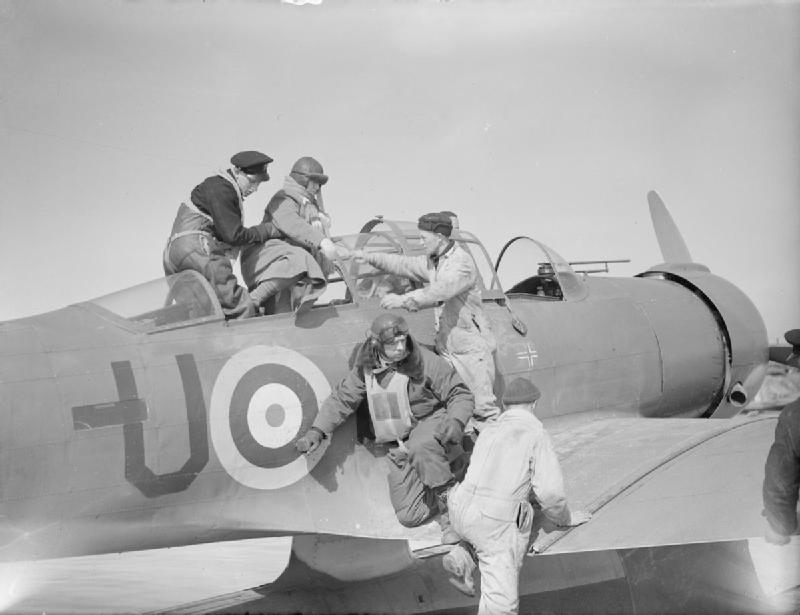
Northrop N-3PB being used to transport a seriously ill woman to hospital in Reykjavik in Iceland, May 1942

The squadron was under RAF Coastal Command in Reykjavík. The eighteen Northrop N-3PB aircraft arrived by ship on 22 May. After final assembly they were operational on 23 June. The squadron was originally set to carry out Arctic convoy escorts. The squadron's A-flight and headquarters were located at Corbett Camp, the B-flight was located at Valhall in Akureyri and the C-flight at Camp Norse in Búðareyri. The latter two were established on 20 June and 14 September, respectively.

It was quickly established that the aircraft were poorly suited for their role. Due to the high latitude their compasses did not work properly, often leaving them without proper navigation. Two aircraft were subject to crashes after misnavigation. They participated in anti-submarine patrols and were part of the capture of U-570. From late 1941 the missions changed focus and the squadron instead took up a role as an air ambulance in Iceland.

Locations of 330 Squadron bases in Iceland

Both Norwegian and British authorities discussed converting the 330 Sqn to use the Lockheed Hudson, but the fighter role was instead placed on two new Norwegian squadrons, 331 and 332. No. 330 was instead issued the Consolidated PBY-5A Catalina in June 1942. However, they were unsuitable for Búðareyri and the Northrops were not needed in Reykjavík, so the squadron ended up with six each of the Catalina and the Northrop. An operating challenge was a lack of spare parts, but the Norwegians were helped both with parts and training by a nearby United States Air Force squadron.

The Catalinas retained the same roles as the Northrops: anti-submarine sweeping, patrol and convoy escort. The aircraft rotated between being based at Reykjavík and at Akureyri. They successfully hit U-592 on 30 June and U-580 on 25 August 1942. In December the Norwegian authorities decided to relocate the 330 Sqn. The Akureyri base was immediately ordered to move its aircraft to Reykjavík. Operations of the Catalina had commenced in November and of the Northrops in December. The C-flight continued to operate out of Búðareyri until 11 June 1943. During its period on Iceland the squadron flew 4379 hours, of which 3524 with the Northrops and 855 with Catalinas. Twenty-one soldiers were killed.

=== Scotland ===
The A- and B-flights departed Iceland for RAF Oban in Scotland on 23 January 1943. This involved a switch to the Short Sunderland flying boat. These were expensive aircraft which the Norwegian government-in-exile could not afford. The RAF therefore agreed to lend the aircraft to the squadron, while operating costs were still paid for by the Norwegians. The squadron was set up with six Mk II and six Mk III, the latter having somewhat longer range. There were technical challenges with the Bristol Pegasus engines, which were underpowered and often stopped mid-air. The situation was often aggravated when the feathering malfunctioned.

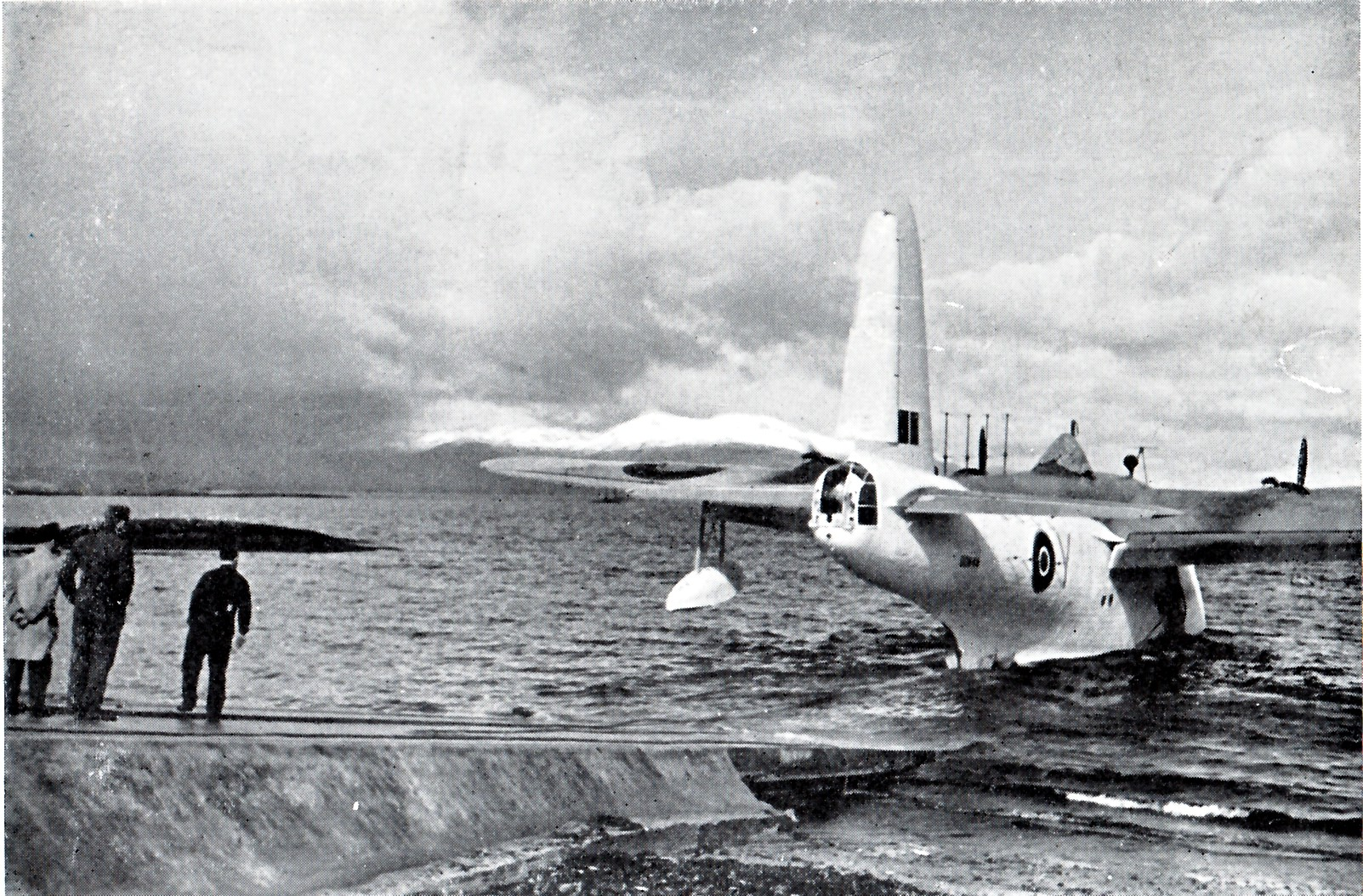
Short Sunderland of the 330 Sqn

The squadron became operative on 20 April 1943. Three days later a detachment was sent to RAF Scatsta in Shetland. The role continued as before, with submarine sweeping, patrol and reconnaissance, as well as meteorological surveys. They regularly patrolled the areas between Shetland past the Faeroe Islands to Iceland. Also active in the area was the Norwegian 333 Squadron and other RAF squadrons. The Sunderlands would on occasion partake in aerial combat with German fighters. Following the Allied Invasion of Normandy in June 1944, German submarines increasingly moved northwards and the 330 Sqn intensified its sweeping. From August the German tactics changed and the 330 Sqn's patrols moved steadily closer to Norway.

During the period in Scotland the squadron flew 12,000 hours, carrying out 655 sweeps and patrols, 50 convoy escorts and 22 search and rescue missions. Five submarines were attacked, sinking one and badly damaging another. No ships escorted by the 330 Sqn were sunk. Six Sunderlands were lost during the war, both due to engine failure and due to enemy action. All but one resulted in loss of life.

In April 1945 the Mk II and III Sunderlands were replaced with Mk V, which had more reliable Pratt & Whitney Twin Wasp. At the End of World War II in Europe in May 1945, the 330 Sqn had eleven operational Sunderlands. While the fighter squadrons were without work, the amount of work for the 330 and 333 Sqn intensified. There was a massive need for air transport, both from the United Kingdom to Norway and within Norway. Both squadrons were transferred to Norway in June, with the 330 Sqn being based at the water aerodrome at Sola Air Station. These were used on a daily coastal route from there to Bergen Airport, Sandviken and Trondheim, often onwards to Tromsø Airport, Skattøra. Both squadrons were soon operating more as airlines than as military units.

Command of the squadron was given to the newly formed Royal Norwegian Air Force on 21 November 1945, when RAF withdrew from Norway. The 330 Sqn was officially deactivated on 15 December 1945. The aircraft were still owned by the RAF, but were not returned until early 1946. Most of the personnel transferred to 333, which had just been relocated to Sola.

== Aircraft previously operated ==
=== World War II ===
Aircraft flown
Dates	Aircraft	Notes
25 April 1941	Northrop N-3PB Nomad	Single-engined floatplane patrol bomber−torpedo bomber built to a Norwegian specification.
July 1942	Consolidated PBY Catalina	Twin-engined flying boat patrol bomber.
February 1943, March 1943, April 1945	Short S.25 Sunderland Mk II, Mk III, Mk V	Four-engined flying boat patrol bomber.

=== Thunderjet ===
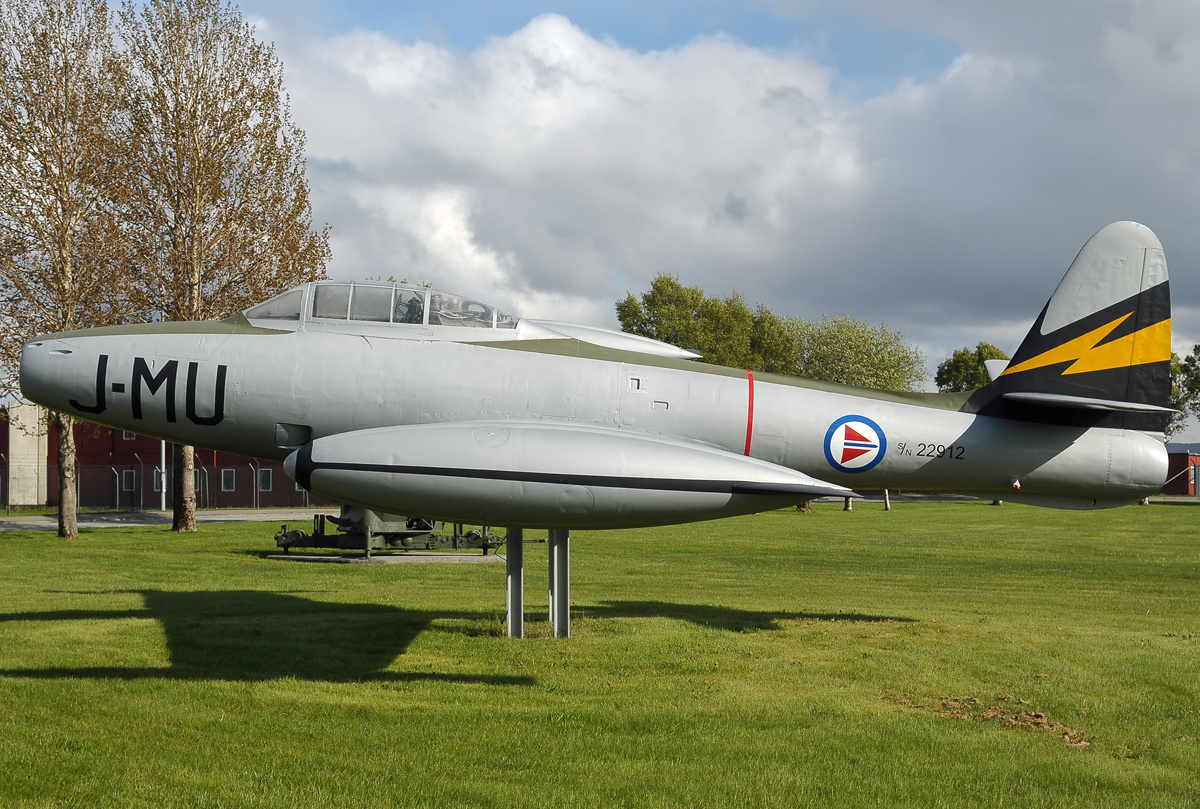
Heritage Republic F-84G Thunderjet of RNoAF

Following Norway's entry into the North Atlantic Treaty Organization (NATO) and as recipients of the Marshall Plan aid, Norway took delivery of its first of 206 Republic F-84 Thunderjets on 10 September 1951, in what would become a delivery of 206 airframes. Six squadrons would in the end be set up to operate the aircraft. As the deliveries advanced, the 330 Squadron was reactivated on 20 July 1953 and stationed at Gardermoen. Half the crew were recruited from other F-84G squadrons, the rest were freshly trained. The first aircraft was acquired on 22 August and by November all had been taken into use. After completing its tactical and bombing training at Lista Air Station in March 1954, the squadron was declared operative.

The squadron had between 22 and 27 airframes while operating the Thunderjets. It was originally set to provide interception, but from 1 November 1954 it was remissioned to become an operational training unit. All F-84G check-outs were carried out in the 330 Sqn, and the instructor pilots received twice the flight hours as their colleagues in other squadrons. Between the training courses the squadron practised bombing at Sola Air Station and participated in exercises. The 330 Sqn moved to Rygge Air Station on 28 August 1956. Following the retirement of the F-84G and the introduction of the North American F-86F Sabre, the 330 Sqn was deactivated on 5 July 1958.

=== Albatross ===
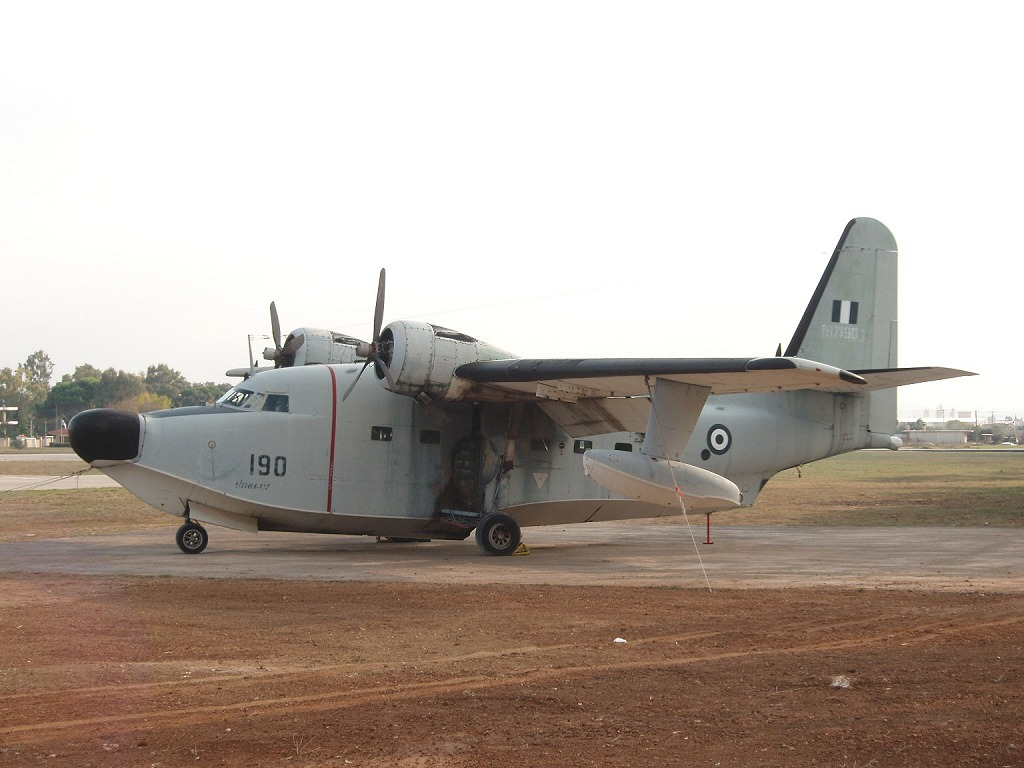
After ending service in Norway the Albatrosses were transferred to the Hellenic Air Force, here depicting an ex-Norwegian heritage aircraft

The 333 Sqn had continued to operate the Catalinas through the 1950s, although they by the end of the decade were all but modern. The Norwegian authorities agreed to receive eighteen Grumman HU-16B-ASW Albatrosses through the Marshall Plan. These flying boats were intended for maritime surveillance and transport to Svalbard, as well as submarine sweeping. 330 and 333 Sqn would receive nine airframes each. Combined they would provide 8,100 flight-hours annual, up from 2,400 with the Catalinas. Training was carried out by the United States Coast Guard and Air Force.

The 300 Sqn's first Albatross landed in February 1962 and the unit was activated at Sola Air Station on 1 March. Delivery of the final aircraft took place in late 1963. The 330 Sqn was designated the operational training unit and all check-outs took place at Sola for both squadrons. From late 1962 a detachment was established at Bardufoss Air Station with one aircraft and one crew. The 330 Sqn was declared operative from 15 July 1963. The detachment was a strain on the unit's moral and its commanded asked his subordinates to withdraw it and replace it with a mobilized unit. The resources used to support the detachment made the 330 Sqn almost unable to provide sweeping operations.

The Albatrosses improved the sweeping capacity and introduced news technology such as sonar, radar and magnetic anomaly detector. Norway did not have capacity to sweep its waters and instead focused on the surveillance. This allowed both British and American forces to carry out such tasks. Despite the leap in technology, the Albatrosses were soon declared obsolete. Allied Forces Northern Europe determined that they needed full anti-submarine capabilities and opted to replace the flying boats with the Lockheed P-3 Orion. Five Orions were capable of the same job as eighteen Albatrosses, and the number of squadrons was cut to one. The 330 Sqn was therefore deactivated on 1 October 1968.

=== Sea King ===
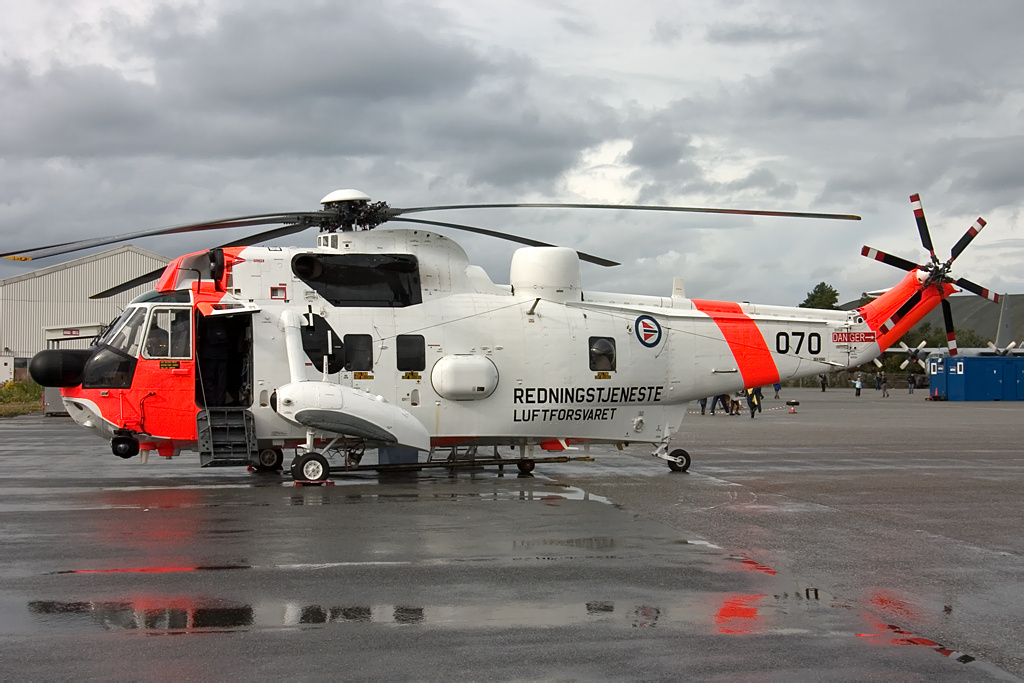
Sea King at Bergen Airport, Flesland

Search and rescue was at the time only a secondary role for various air force units, such as the Albatross, Bell UH-1B and Bell 47. Norway lacked the dedicated SAR service that Denmark had. This became evident in 1966, when the Norwegian ferry Skagerrak sank off the Danish coast in September 1966. Everyone on board was saved, but it was questioned whether this would have been the case if the incident had occurred in Norwegian waters. The task was given to the Ministry of Justice, who as a temporary solution from 1968 to 1973 signed an agreement with Helikopter Service to operate two Sikorsky S-61 out of Sola and Bodø.

Both a private operation with civilian aircraft, a military operation and a joint civilian and military operation were considered. A single operator built with a fast roll-out would give the lowest investments. The Air Force was interested in operating this service to replace its own rescue service, to gain political goodwill and to add to the anti-submarine capability. The latter was rejected by the politicians. The Westland Sea King was chosen over the S-61 due to a better offset agreement. Parliament approved the purchase of ten helicopters in 1970, to be stationed at four bases, Sola, Ørland, Bodø and Banak. This would allow any location along the coast to be reached within 90 minutes. The Oslofjord and Skagerrak was covered by Bell UH-1s of the 720 Squadron at Rygge.

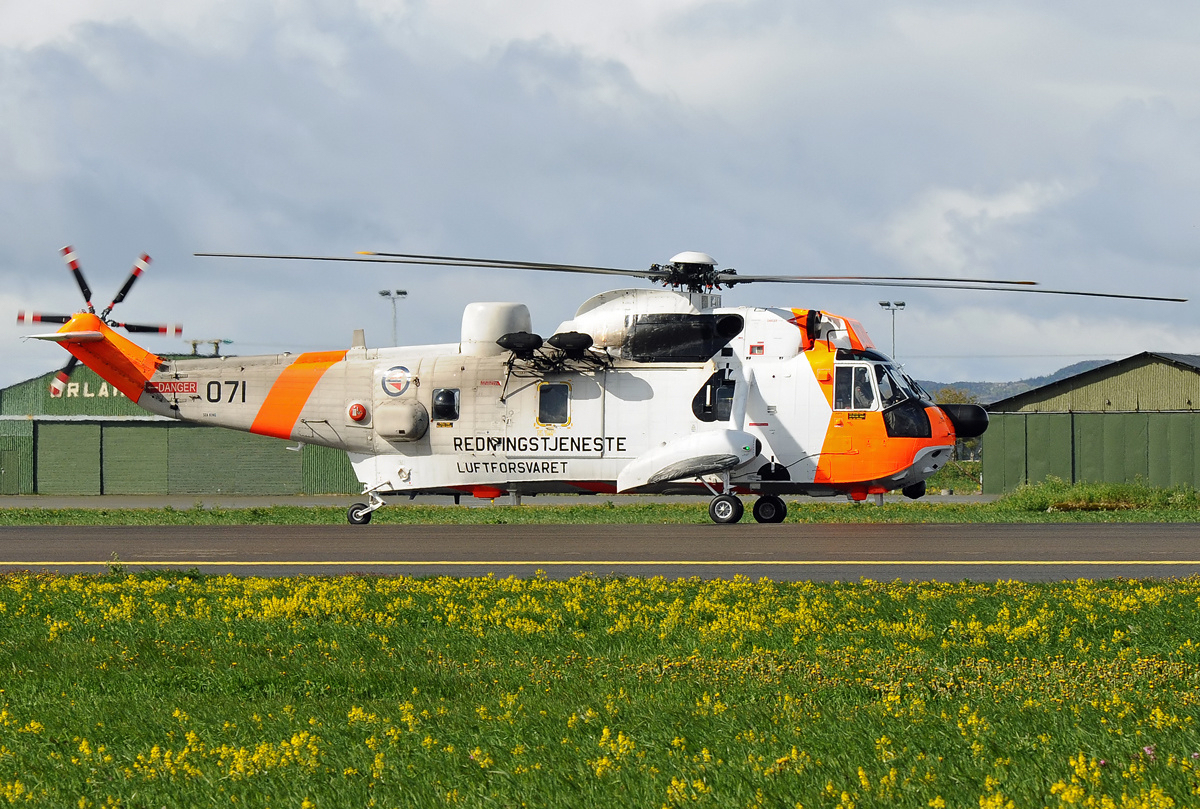
Sea King at Ørland Main Air Station

The 330 Sqn was assigned the SAR task and was headquartered at Bodø Main Air Station, with a wing at each location. The A-flight was at Bodø, the B-flight at Banak, the C-flight at Ørland and the D-flight at Sola. Of ten aircraft, two were stationed at each base and two were at any given time in for overhaul. The flights were re-designated as detachments from 1980. The squadron was officially reactivated on 25 April 1973. The flights at Sola and Bodø were operative 1 May and the other two on 1 August. The first major was on 7 April 1974, when the Banak flight saved 13 lives off the trawler Longvabakk in Oksfjorden.

Especially among the first officers the SAR service was not what they had imagined when joining the air force and many applied to the Air Force Academy. This caused new first officers to be ordered to the 300 Sqn, which reinforced the problems, resulting in high turnover. The Sea Kings were designed to be maritime helicopters, but were increasingly used for terrestrial SAR missions, and on occasion aerial firefighting. Throughout the 1970s the number of air ambulance missions increased dramatically, hitting 242 in 1977.

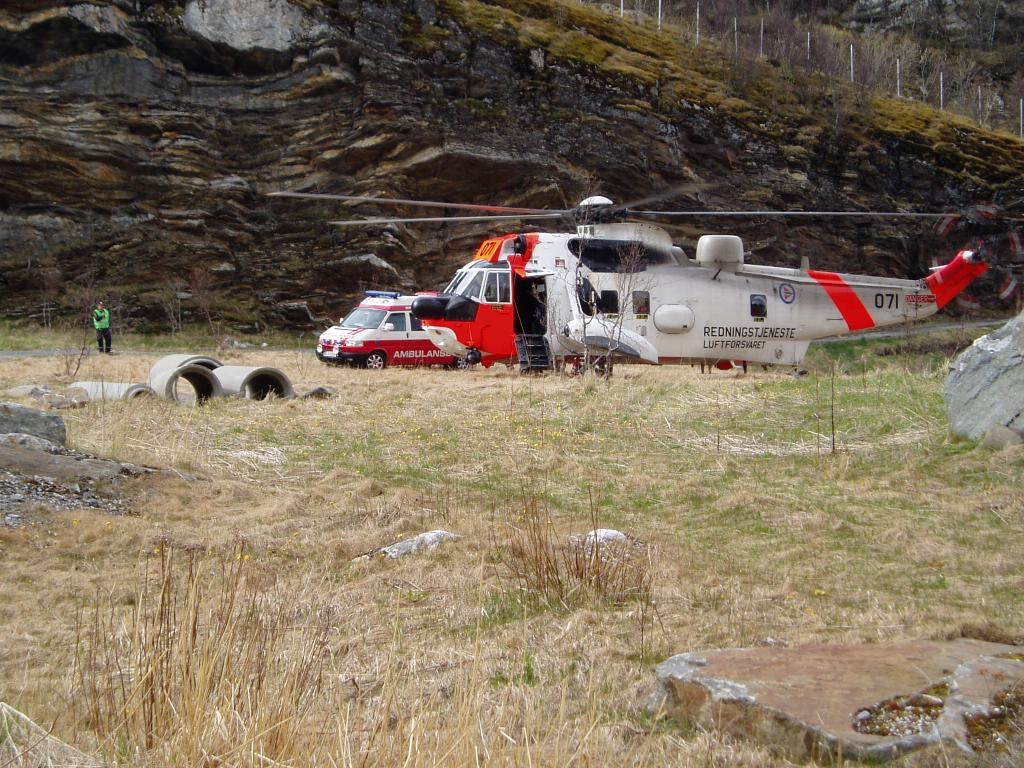
Sea King and ambulance during a mission near Bodø

On 30 April 1977 one helicopter disappeared off the coast of Sola. A replacement helicopter was delivered in January 1978. Three helicopters participated in the most extensive operation following the sinking of Alexander L. Kielland on 27 March 1980. On 22 April 1982 another helicopter crashed, this time without fatalities, when hitting a power line in Sirdal Municipality. Another such incident occurred on 10 November 1986 near Bodø, this time with one fatality. In 1988 another helicopter crashed at Tyinvann in 1988, without fatalities and with the aircraft being repaired. During the late 1980s the helicopters were often grounded due to lack of spare parts, which on 6 July 1988 hindered the unit form participating in aiding the sinking Piper Alpha oil platform.

The National Air Ambulance Service was inaugurated in 1988 and the 330 Sqn became part of this. This involved the acquisition of eight smaller ambulance helicopters—later increased to twelve—which could relieve the Sea Kings. Meanwhile, the air ambulance role of the Sea Kings were increased with the inclusions of an anaesthesiologist on board. This would also aid in SAR missions, where the rescued could be severely injured. The task of providing the anaesthesiologist was placed with the county municipality.

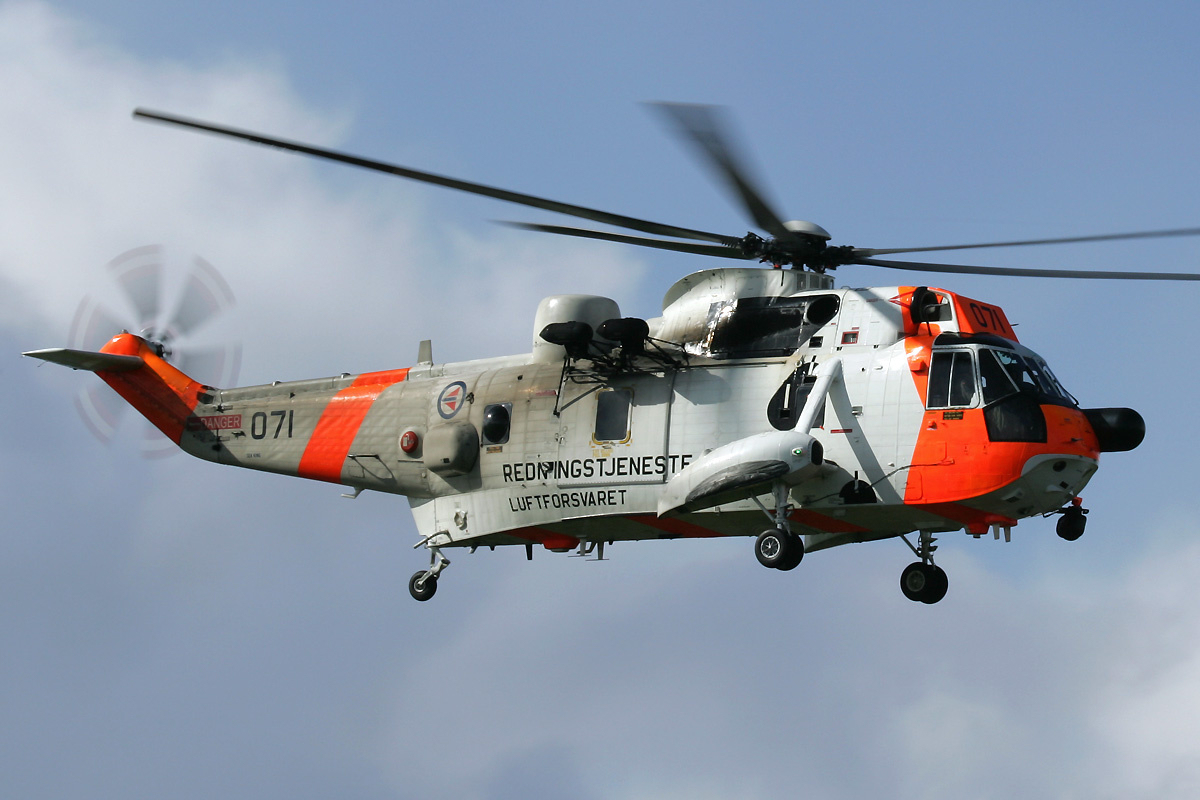
Sea King during flight

The accident in 1988 reduced the fleet to eight. This spurred the Ministry of Justice to wet lease the services of the commercial companies Helikopter Service and Mørefly, respectively operating S-61 and Eurocopter AS332 Super Puma. These were placed at Ålesund Airport, Vigra from 1 November 1988 to 31 January 1989, at Sandefjord Airport, Torp from 1 February 1989 to 31 December 1990, and from 1 January to 31 July 1991 at Sola.

The Sea Kings had two accidents in 1990 and 1991, respectively, after which the helicopters needed to be renovated. A new Mk 43B was delivered in August 1992, followed by the renovated aircraft from the 1990 crash. The main difference was new avionics. The squadron then, one by one, upgraded the avionics on the entire fleet, a job completed in 1996. The role of the SAR service was evaluated in 1992 and it ended up with Parliament approving the purchase of two more helicopters, bringing the total to twelve. The two new helicopters were delivered in 1995.

With the additional helicopters, the 330 Sqn could open a new base, at Ålesund Airport, Vigra. The goal was to increase the coverage in Møre og Romsdal and Sogn og Fjordane, situated midway between Ørland and Sola. By 1998 the government instead determined that the extra helicopters should be based in Eastern Norway and moved the base to Rygge Air Station. The new base became operational on 22 March 1999. This relieved the 720 Sqn for their SAR task, for which they neither had suitable aircraft nor the necessary preparedness.

From 2002 the anaesthesiologist became the responsibility of the respective health trust. From 2004 the funding was changed and the 330 Sqn is paid for through the Ministry of Justice and the Police. From the start the service had a reaction time, from alarm to airborne, of 60 minutes. Sola was the first base to receive an on-call room, allowing the response time to be lowered to 15 minutes. This proved successful and was introduced at Banak in 2006, Bodø in 2007, and Ørland and Rygge in 2008. A sixth base was opened at Florø Airport in 2009. The 330 Squadron was featured in an eight-episode television documentary series of the same name, broadcast by the Norwegian Broadcasting Corporation in 2009.

=== AW101 ===
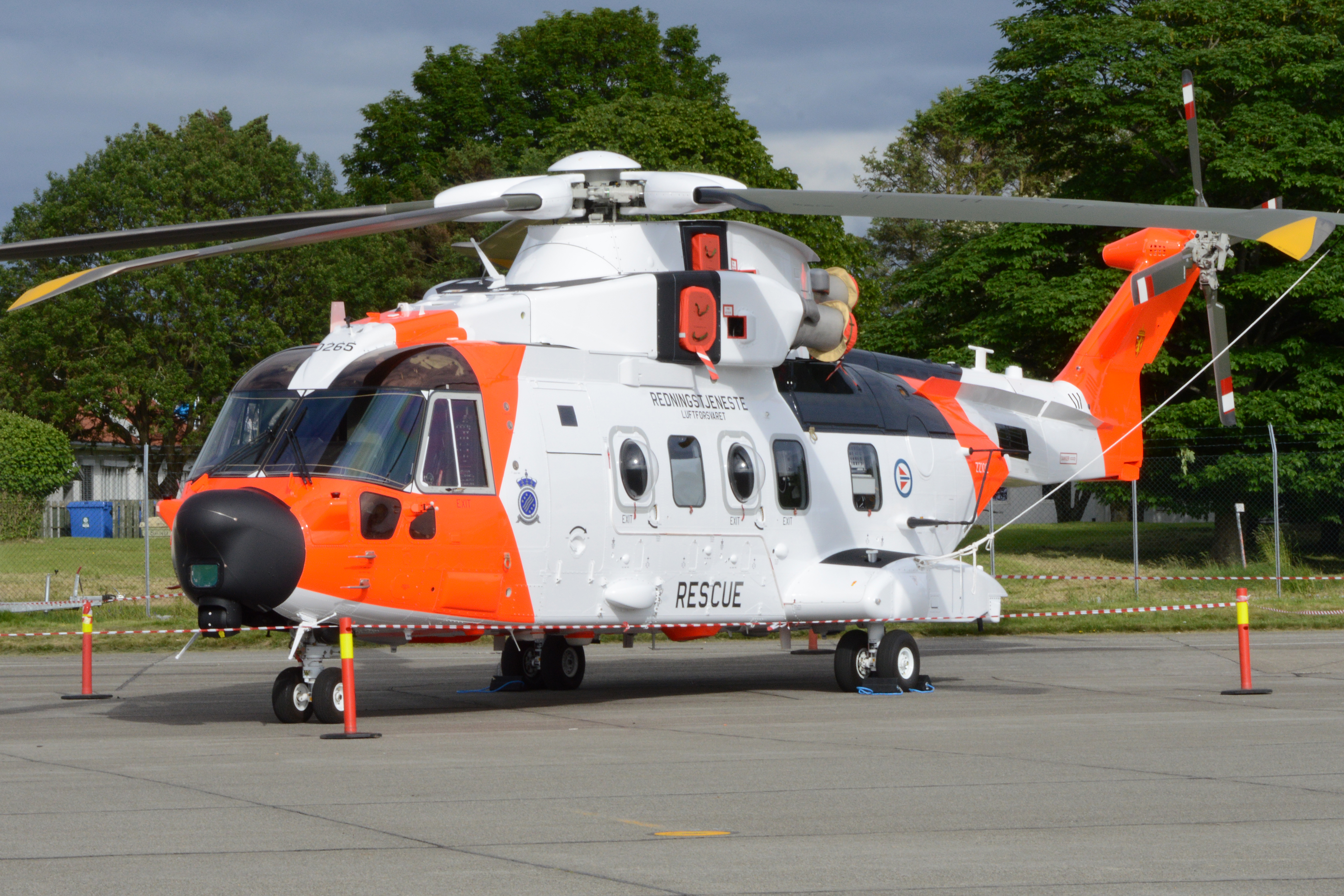
A Norwegian Leonardo AW101 SAR Queen helicopter, 2017

The replacement of the Sea Kings was first discussed in a Norwegian Official Report in 1997. In competition with the AgustaWestland AW101, the Eurocopter AS532 Cougar and the Sikorsky S-92, Norway ordered fourteen NHIndustries NH90 helicopters in 2001 to meet the needs of the Royal Norwegian Navy. Options would be places for a future ten SAR helicopters and fifteen troop transports. By operating only one class of helicopters, the Air Force hoped to cut costs.

The Ministry of Justice canceled the options in 2007 and instead initiated a new procurement process. This resulted in a project organization being established, Norwegian All Weather Search and Rescue Helicopter (NAWSARH). The procurement was in cooperation with Icelandic authorities. The project prequalified four models, NH90, AW101, EC-725 and S-92. On 8 November 2013 the project announced that it had selected AgustaWestland as the provider. The contract is for sixteen units with an option for a further six. The first helicopter were delivered in 2017.

AW101 replaced Sea King base for base, with Sola Air base declared operative with the new helicopters September 1st 2020. At the same time it was revealed that AW101 in Norwegian service is named SAR Queen. Ørland Air base was the next to be operative in May 2021.

The last Sea King retired by December 12th 2023 when it was replaced by a SAR Queen at Bodø Air station.

== Fleet ==
The following is a list of the fleet composition of the 330 Sqd. The quantity (qty) specifies the peak number of simultaneously operated aircraft.

Fleet
Aircraft	Qty	Period
Northrop N-3PB	18	1941–43
Consolidated PBY Catalina	6	1942–43
Short Sunderland II	6	1943–45
Short Sunderland III	6	1943–45
Short Sunderland V	12	1945
Republic F-84G Thunderjet	27	1953–58
Grumman HU-16 Albatross	18	1962–68
Westland Sea King	12	1973–2023
AgustaWestland AW101	16	2020-Present

== Personnel ==
- Christian Roy Kaldager
- Stefan Kutzsche
- Oluf Reed Olsen
- Einar Sverre Pedersen

== Bibliography ==
- Arheim, Tom; Hafsten, Bjørn; Olsen, Bjørn; Thuve, Sverre (1994). Fra Spitfire til F-16: Luftforsvaret 50 år 1944–1994 (in Norwegian). Oslo: Sem & Stenersen. ISBN 82-7046-068-0.
- Duvsete, Svein (2004). Luftforsvarets historie: Kalde krigere og barmhjertige samartaner (in Norwegian). Oslo: Aschehoug. ISBN 82-03-22071-1.
- Glenne, Roar (2012). Oppdrag utført : Norges luftmilitære kulturarv (in Norwegian). Oslo: Forsvarsmuseet. ISBN 978-82-91218-55-7.
- Hjelle, Bjørn Owe (2007). Ålesund lufthavn Vigra (in Norwegian). Valderøya. ISBN 978-82-92055-28-1.
- Henriksen, Vera (1996). Luftforsvarets historie: Fem år i utlegd (in Norwegian). Oslo: Aschehoug. ISBN 82-03-22070-3.
- The Illustrated Encyclopedia of Aircraft (Part Work 1982-1985). Orbis Publishing.
- Jefford, C.G. (1988). RAF Squadrons. Airlife Publishing Ltd. ISBN 1-85310-053-6.
- Ministry of Justice and the Police. Prop. 146 S (2010–2011) – Anskaffelse av nye redningshelikoptre mv. i perioden 2013–2020 (PDF) (in Norwegian).
- NOU 1997:3 – Om Redningshelikoptertjenesten (PDF). Norwegian Official Report (in Norwegian). Ministry of Justice and the Police. 1997. Archived from the original (PDF) on 26 February 2014.
