= Oluf Reed-Olsen =

Norwegian resistance member and pilot (1918–2002)

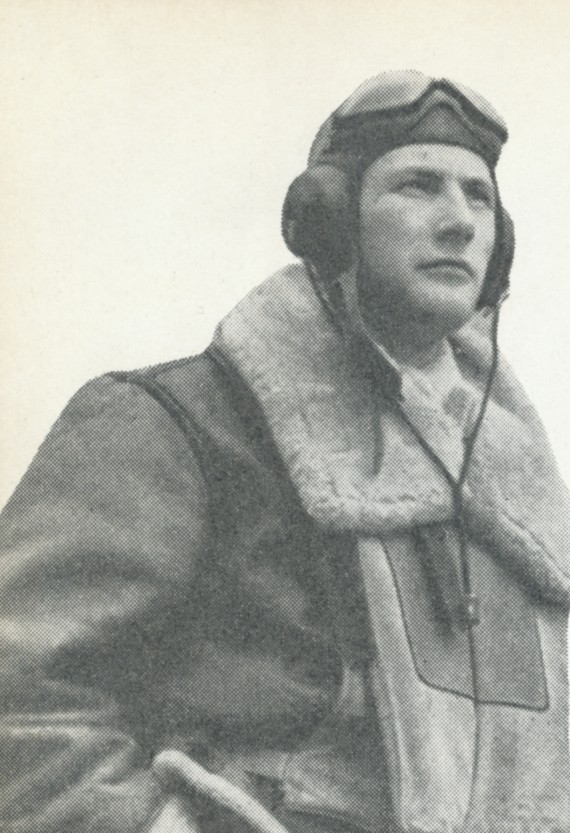
- Reed-Olsen in Iceland in 1941-42
- Born: 8 July 1918; Aker Municipality, Norway
- Died: 14 October 2002 (aged 84); Oslo, Norway
- Spouse: Joan Whiteside (m. 1944)
- Military career
- Allegiance: Norway
- Branch: Royal Norwegian Navy Air Service
- Rank: Captain
- Unit: No. 330 Squadron RAF
- Awards: War Cross with sword, Norwegian War Medal, Defence Medal 1940–1945 with rosette
- Other work: Businessman and Scouting leader

Oluf Bernhard Reed-Olsen (8 July 1918 – 14 October 2002) was a Norwegian resistance member and pilot during World War II. As a resistance member he is best known for the Lysaker Bridge sabotage as well as operating illegal radio transmitters. After the war he was a businessman and Scouting leader. He wrote books and contributed to a film based on his war experience.

== Early life ==
He was born in Aker Municipality, Norway. He grew up in Bestum and graduated from middle school at Ullern in 1934. He then took commerce school and took pilot education in the airline Widerøe's Flyveselskap.

== World War II ==
=== Sabotage and escape ===
When World War II reached Norway with a German invasion on 9 April 1940, he started resistance work on the same day. On the night between 13 and 14 April he blew up the Lysaker Bridge together with Kåre Moe and Leif Moe. This sabotage had national-level repercussions, in that it contributed to the surfacing of the Administrative Council on the next day. The Germans soon took control over Norway, and Reed-Olsen and Kåre Moe were sent to photograph and spy on German installations, most importantly at Oslo Airport, Fornebu. Reed-Olsen had easier access around town because he had joined the civil firefighting squad of Furulund as a team leader and owned a motorbike.

They were caught after breaking into a crashed aircraft at Fornebu. Although the Germans did not know the nature of their actions, they were apprehended and sent to Oslo. At Lysaker Bridge the lorry slowed down because of the bridge damage and the two escaped from the lorry, jumped into Lysakerelva, swam further down and eventually careered to their homes. The two fled Norway by boat from Bestumkilen on 2 September. Reed-Olsen bought the boat after selling his motorbike. They first sailed down the Norwegian coast and picked up a third man Rolf Gabrielsen whom they met in Mandal. They finally left for the United Kingdom from Farsund on 14 September. According to Reed-Olsen, they had almost reached the Aberdeen district when the wind turned and brought them as far east as Jutland. After the wind turned again, they almost reached the Thames, when on 29 September they were picked up by the British destroyer HMS Bedouin. After a diversion when the ship had to salvage crashed pilots (one of five was alive), the Norwegians set foot in Edinburgh on 4 October.

=== Air service and intelligence ===
They soon travelled to London. They reported at the Norwegian recruiting office, spent one month in the city before leaving for Canada via Scotland, on the ocean liner SS Duchess of Richmond. They reached Toronto and were drafted into the Royal Norwegian Navy Air Service. They were stationed on the Norwegian steamship Iris before the training camp Little Norway opened, and then about three months at Toronto Flying Club before finally going to Little Norway. Reed-Olsen graduated from the air force academy there in 1941. They then went on a fourteen-day boat trip from Halifax, Canada via England and Scotland to Iceland.

He served in 330 Squadron. From 1942 he underwent training in intelligence, telegraphy and parachuting. On 20 April 1943 he was paradropped over Eiker, from whence he bicycled to Southern Norway. He performed intelligence radio broadcasts from the Birkenes area and elsewhere. He served the Secret Intelligence Service. In the autumn of 1943 he operated the radio station codenamed Meton in Lommedalen together with Hjelm Waage Thurn-Basberg, with whom he had worked in Southern Norway. Meton was one of nine illegal transmitters in Bærum; four of these belonged to the Secret Intelligence Service. It was also transmitted from Kolsås for a short time.

Both Reed-Olsen and Thurn-Basberg fled to England via Sweden shortly thereafter. Reed-Olsen then had another stay in Norway before going to Canada again. In 1944 he married Joan Whiteside in Toronto. He went on a fundraiser tour in the United States for the post-war rebuilding of Norway. For his efforts he was decorated with the War Cross With Sword and the Distinguished Service Cross.

== Post-war life ==
After the war he worked for the Royal Norwegian Air Force (as a captain), then the civil companies Det Norske Luftfartsselskap and Norsk Brændselolje before becoming an independent businessman. He also dedicated himself to Scouting, arranged summer camps at Håøya and was a board member of the Norwegian Guide and Scout Association. He chronicled his war experiences in the books Contact (1946, reissued 1983) and Vi kommer igjen (1953), (published in English as Two Eggs On My Plate). The first book was made into the motion picture Kontakt in 1956, with Reed-Olsen contributing as a screenwriter and actor. He died in October 2002 in Oslo.

== Honours and awards ==
- War Cross with sword (1944)
- Norwegian War Medal
- Defence Medal 1940–1945 with rosette
- Distinguished Service Cross (United Kingdom)
