= Lysaker Bridge sabotage =

The Lysaker Bridge sabotage (Norwegian: Lysakeraksjonen, lit. 'The Lysaker Action') was a sabotage action in World War II which occurred in Norway on the night between 13 and 14 April 1940 when a bridge at Lysaker, bordering Oslo, was blown up.

== Background ==
Lysaker was, and still is, an important transport hub situated near the mouth of the river Lysakerelva, which forms the border between Bærum and Oslo (in 1940: Bærum and Aker). The Drammen Line railway crosses Lysakerelva with its own bridge at Lysaker, as does the European route E18 highway. The highway is the main connection between Oslo and western parts of Norway.

On 9 April 1940, Nazi Germany invaded then-neutral Norway in Operation Weserübung. Oslo Airport, Fornebu, situated very close to Lysaker, was especially crucial in the quick attack, while the highway was crucial to German troop transport. Also on 9 April, Nazi Vidkun Quisling staged a coup d'etat.

== Incident ==
The sabotage occurred on the night between 13 and 14 April 1940, when Oluf Reed-Olsen and the brothers Leif Moe and Kåre Moe blew up the bridge at Lysaker. According to Reed Olsen's memoirs, the saboteurs had been recruited by British intelligence and were part of a coordinated action against four bridges north of Oslo. The goal was to relieve the German pressure on the Norwegian front lines and allow a respite for new position to be established. The saboteurs were accustomed to using dynamite for civilian purposes, but had no saboteur training. The action, using some 30 kg of stolen dynamite, blew a hole in the roadway of the bridge and rendered it temporarily impassable for traffic. The actions against the other bridges, one between Drammen and Hønefoss, and two more at Sandvika, were exposed in the preparatory phase and two men arrested by the Germans.

The incident was linked to a speech made by J. H. Marshall-Cornwall in BBC the day before, in which he encouraged Norwegians to destroy telephone and road connections. The reason this particular bridge was chosen, was an amassing of Norwegian troops near Sollihøgda west of Oslo. German troops were concentrated in Oslo, and a military excursion to the woody areas around Sollihøgda could be imminent.

== Consequences ==
The sabotage contributed to the surfacing of the Administrative Council. This council consisted of a group of prominent men who had come together already on 12 April to discuss a Norwegian administration without Vidkun Quisling. Then, on 14 April, Supreme Court Justice Paal Berg, County Governor Ingolf Elster Christensen and Bishop Eivind Berggrav appeared in the now Nazi-controlled Norwegian Broadcasting Corporation radio to lament the sabotage. Their messages were recorded and rerun throughout the day, and contained calls to cease violent resistance. The official Broadcasting Corporation policy since the Nazi usurping was similar: to spread a calm attitude in the people. Nikolaus von Falkenhorst also spoke in Norwegian radio, and blamed British broadcasts for stirring up a sentiment and will to sabotage in the Norwegian people. The same attitude was conveyed by Edvard Sylou-Creutz in his Norwegian-language broadcast from German soil.

Germans also faced the fact that they actively had to promote more cooperation with the existing establishment than did Quisling. Curt Bräuer was instrumental in installing the Administrative Council, though he promised Adolf Hitler that Quisling would be a part of it. The Administrative Council replaced Quisling's coup government already on the next day, 15 April. Ingolf Elster Christensen chaired it. However, it became short-lived. Bräuer was fired for not securing Quisling a seat, and the Reichskommissariat Norwegen took over, disestablishing the council on 25 September.

For the Norwegian resistance movement in general, the bridge sabotage showed a possible path of action. Official Norwegian (government in exile) policy was to be careful with sabotage; this was essentially given up later, in 1944. Many other groups conducted organized sabotage from an earlier point.

The saboteurs Reed-Olsen and Kåre Moe had to flee Norway; this happened by boat from Bestumkilen on 2 September.
