= Weather-related cancellation =

Cancellation of an event due to weather

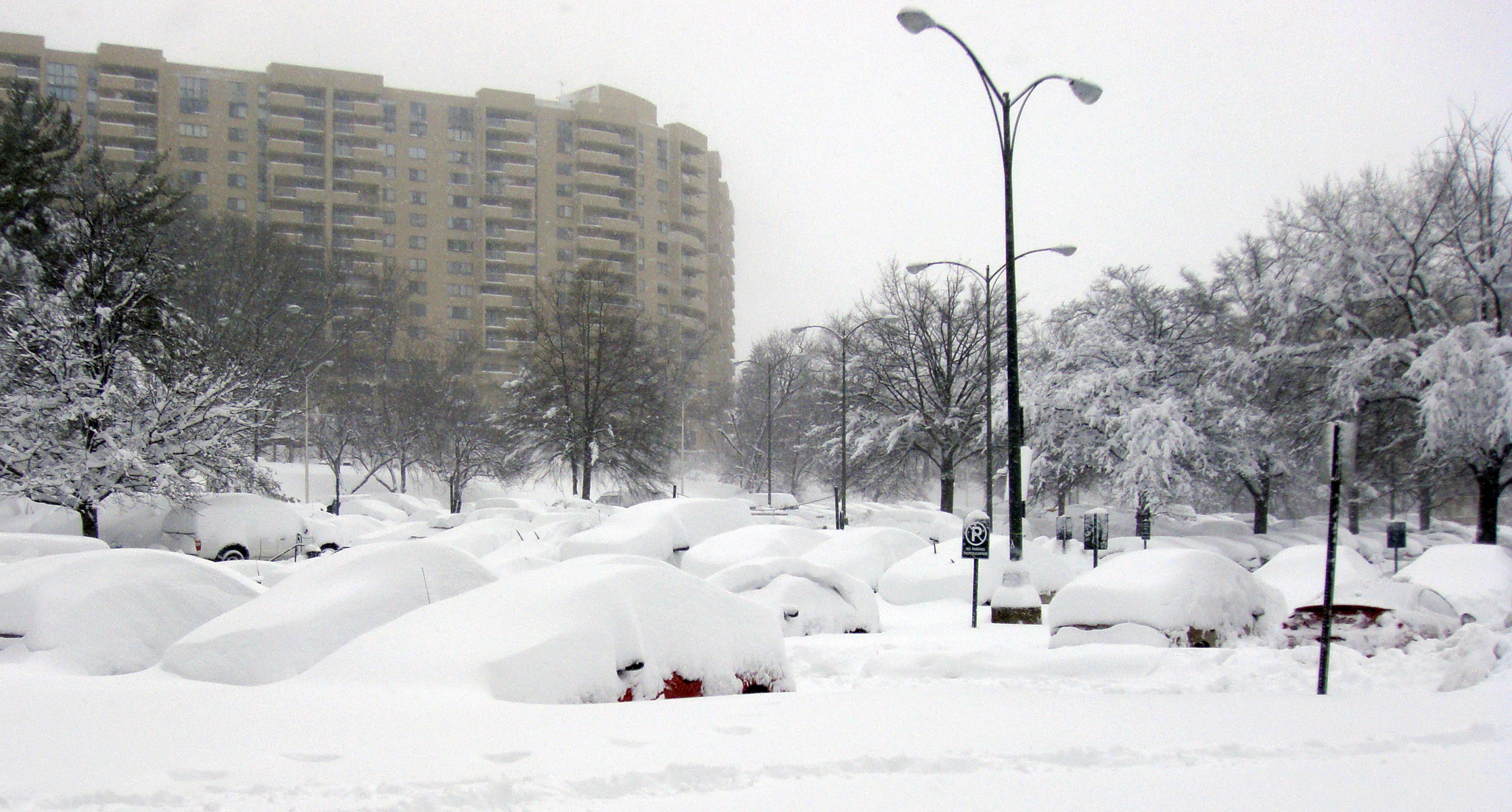
When cars are covered and roads are impassable, closings and cancellations are likely to occur

A weather cancellation or delay is closure, cancellation, or delay of an institution, operation, or event as a result of inclement weather. Certain institutions, such as schools, are likely to close when bad weather, such as snow, extreme cold, flooding, air pollution, tropical cyclones, or extreme heat, causes power outages, or otherwise impedes public safety or makes opening the facility impossible or more difficult. Depending upon the local climate, the chances of a school or school system closing may vary. While some regions may close or delay schools when there is any question of safety, others located in areas where bad weather is a regular occurrence may remain open, as local people may be accustomed to travelling under such conditions.

Many countries and sub-national jurisdictions have mandates for a minimum number of school days in a year. To meet these requirements, many schools that face a likelihood of closure build a few extra school days into their calendar. If, by the end of the year, these days are unused, some schools give students days off. If all snow days are exhausted, and inclement weather requires more closures, schools usually make the days up later in the year. US State education departments have, for example by administrative decision late in the 2015 Texas school year, occasionally issued waivers to schools, so that they do not need make up days for weather-related cancellations.

== Reasons ==
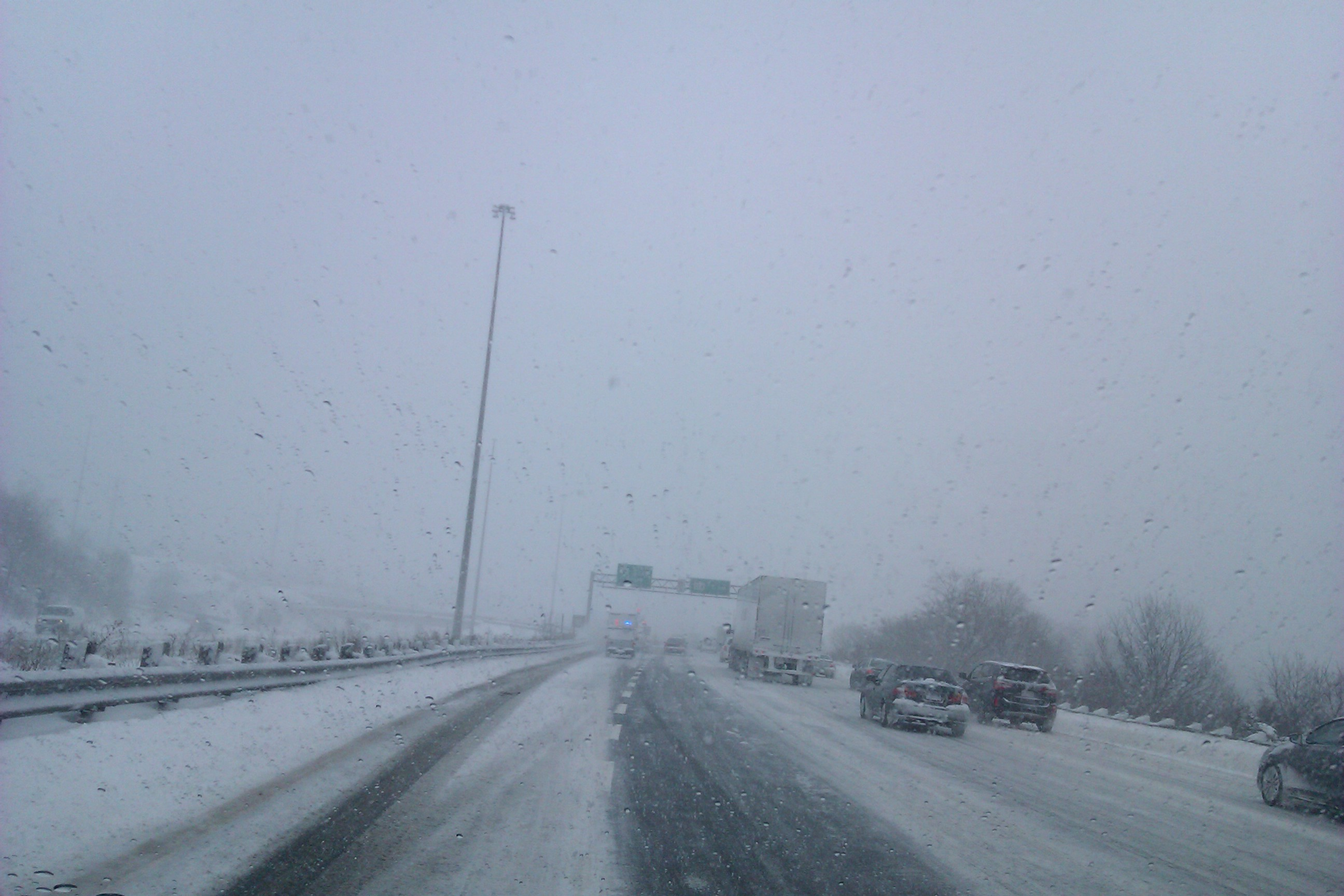
Hazardous travel conditions may result in closings and cancellations

=== Road safety ===
Safety is the central factor in deciding whether to cancel or delay. Officials may close schools to prevent accidents and other problems caused by inclement weather.

Minor storms, when safety is of less concern, may cause few or no cancellations or delays. In severe inclement weather, however, only the most essential operations remain functional. Operations considered essential include health care, emergency services, and retail of basic necessities. In health care environments, employees may remain at the facility around the clock if travel is impaired or dangerous, as those facilities contain basic accommodations for sleeping and eating such as on-call rooms. While tourist attractions generally close, those housing live animals may need essential employees to provide proper animal care.

Television and radio services generally keep operating (unless they in turn are taken off the air by the weather), and travel as necessary. Elected officials travel as necessary to provide services to the public. Snow removal crews remain at work.

=== Passability ===
Some inclement weather makes road passage impossible or difficult. In developed nations, municipalities attempt to clear snow-covered roads—but this is not always possible, and often many cannot travel. In deeper snowfalls, personal vehicles may become trapped, and their removal may take several days. This influences decisions on closures beyond the end of snowfall. The ability of employees to reach work places is a factor.

=== Structural issues ===
Various types of severe weather can damage structures temporarily or render them permanently useless, cause power outages, or prevent heat or air conditioning from working.

== Snow days ==
=== North America ===
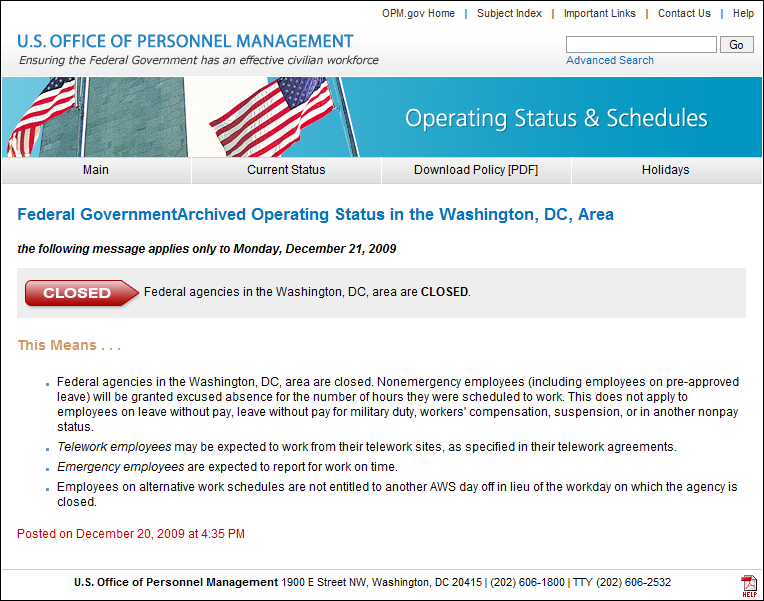
United States Office of Personnel Management notification that Federal agencies in the Washington, D.C. area would be closed on December 21, 2009, due to the North American blizzard of 2009.

A snow day in the United States and Canada is a day that school classes are cancelled or delayed by snow, heavy ice, or extremely low temperatures. Similar measures occur in response to flooding, tornado watches, and severe weather (storms, hurricanes, dense fog, heavy snow, etc.). The criterion for a snow day is primarily the inability of school buses to operate safely on their routes and danger to children who walk to school. Often, the school remains officially open even though buses do not run and classes are cancelled.

More and more schools are closing due to extreme heat, "heat days". Heat days are like snow days. Some districts (San Diego Unified) provide schools with an operational procedure that is used as a guideline to address what actions schools should take at different levels of rising temperatures.

Schools and businesses may also be cancelled for reasons other than bad weather such as a pandemic, power failure, terrorist attack, bomb threat, teacher strike or in honour of a school staff member who has recently died. In some cases, only one school or business in a town may close, due to localized issues such as a water main break or a lack of heat or air conditioning.

In northern areas of the United States, where municipalities are well equipped to handle heavy snowfall, snow days occur when extreme winter weather events overwhelm typical efforts to safely clear main roads of snow and ice (1 to 2 feet of snow). Weather induced cancellations or delays can also happen in more temperate southern regions, which are traditionally less prepared to handle such situations. In areas less accustomed to snow—such as Atlanta, Dallas, Memphis, or Chattanooga—even small snowfalls of an inch or two may render roads unsafe, while in some large northern metropolitan areas, effectively mobilized plow and road salt crews can clear 10 or more inches of overnight snow and ice accumulation before the morning commute.

In most areas, schools include extra days in their calendar as "built-in" snow days which allow a school to get in the minimum number of hours or days for instruction. When the number of snow days taken is less than the number of built-in days, the days are given back by extending Memorial Day weekend, or making the school year end earlier. Once the number of snow days taken exceeds the number of built-in days, the snow days must be made up. In other states, like New Jersey, all snow days must be made up. For example, schools may open school on some federal holidays, shorten spring break, open on Saturdays, lengthen school days to reach the equivalent number of missed hours, turn early release days into full days, or sometimes make the school year end later. However, some schools are more forgiving, and do not mandate make-up days. In the event of heavy snow, tools have arisen to help students calculate the chance of a weather-related cancellation, most commonly snow days.

=== United Kingdom ===
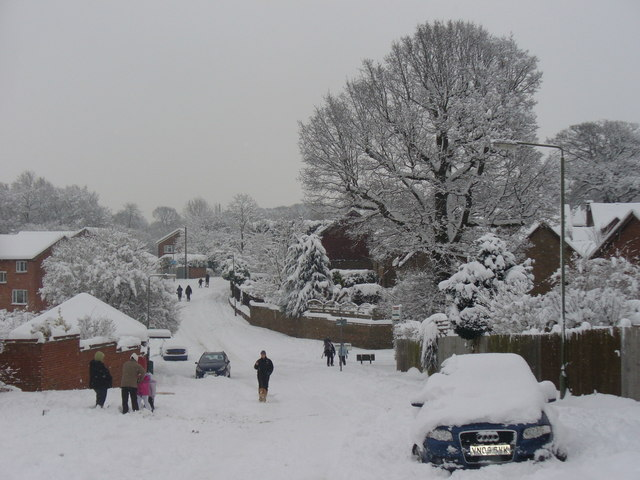
Abandoned cars in the snow on Hareward Road, Guildford, in the United Kingdom

In the United Kingdom, snow days are a relatively uncommon event, especially in southern regions. Scottish, Northern Irish, Welsh, and Northern English schools may experience some closures during the winter months, often due to travel disruption. In Southern England, however, significant snowfall is a less frequent event, rarely lasting for more than a few days across low-lying areas.

=== Australia ===
Very few schools in Australia regularly receive any, let alone significant snowfalls. Those who do, will generally have their own local snow policies, similar to how schools in bush fire or flood-prone areas will have policies to handle these events. If a school is closed due to snow, it is treated as an emergency closure and no additional days are added to make up for the closure. But more commonly Australian schools can shut down due to heat.

=== Delays ===
Instead of cancelling an entire school day, some schools may delay opening by, for example, one or two hours, or announce a particular opening time. This can be advantageous in places where schools are not charged a "snow day" by delaying their opening. Many school authorities cancel the whole morning kindergarten under these circumstances. This is particularly common during snowfalls of 2 inches (5.1 cm) or less in areas not accustomed to winter snowfall, such as the Baltimore metropolitan area and points south.

In the event of fog, some schools may delay the opening of school three hours but extend the day an extra hour.

== Heat ==
=== Australia ===
Contrary to popular legend circulated among school children, schools rarely close due to hot weather and if they were it would be a decision based on a risk assessment by school staff. There is no set policy stating at what point schools close, and most states explicitly state that schools do not close simply due to hot weather. Schools may however modify their operations to ensure student and teacher welfare, for example by cancelling sport activities or relocating to a part of the school with access to air conditioning.

Non-government Schools may follow their own procedures however.

== Rain and floods ==
=== Philippines ===
As per Department of Education (DepEd) Order No. 37 series of 2022, Classes and work in schools are cancelled or suspended classes during a typhoon, heavy rainfall, flood, earthquake, and power outages/power interruptions/brownouts.

During a typhoon, DepEd said that in-person, online classes and work from Kindergarten to Grades 12 and Alternative Learning System (ALS) in all levels are “automatically cancelled” in public schools situated in Local Government Units (LGUs) issued with Tropical Cyclone Wind Signals (TCWS) 1, 2, 3, 4, or 5 by the Philippine Atmospheric, Geophysical, and Astronomical Services Administration (PAGASA). Also, in-person, online classes and work at all levels are also automatically cancelled in schools situated in LGUs issued with Orange and Red Rainfall Warning by the PAGASA as well as areas issued with a Flood Warning by PAGASA.

While private schools must abide the existing rules of Executive Order No. 66 of the Department of Education (DepEd), classes in private schools and work in government institutions could be suspended automatically depending on the typhoon warning signal raised by the PAGASA in a particular area, such as when Tropical Cyclone Wind Signal (TCWS) No. 1 was in effect, preschool and kindergarten classes in the affected areas shall be automatically cancelled or suspended, when Tropical Cyclone Wind Signal (TCWS) No. 2 was in effect, preschool, kindergarten, elementary and secondary classes in the affected areas shall be automatically cancelled or suspended and when Tropical Cyclone Wind Signal (TCWS) No. 3 or above was in effect, classes in all educational levels (including colleges and universities) in the affected areas shall be automatically cancelled or suspended.

In an absence of a typhoon signal warning and during floods, the executive of a local government units (LGUs) in their own capacity as chairpersons of the local disaster risk and management councils throughout the Philippines could declare a suspension and resumption of classes and government office work depending on the situation in their area of responsibility.

With DepEd Order No. 14 series of 2026, there are four learning continuity framework during disasters which are Hayo (Continue), Hinay (Ease-in), Hinga (Check-In), and Hinto (Stop). Hayo has regular physical classes in school including if the LGUs decide and announce to resume classes (May Pasok (Have Classes)), Hinay is where physical class is suspended and switch to home studying, Hinga focuses on the well-being of the students and teachers, and Hinto is where all school activities are suspended.

== Settings affected ==
=== Workplaces ===
Workplaces are less likely to close during mildly inclement weather, but the more severe the storm, the more likely a workplace is to close.

Some employers who use the most essential types of employees, such as health care facilities, have some or all of their employees stay and sleep on the premises while off duty if bad weather that hampers commuting is anticipated. Many supermarkets, convenience stores, and gas stations try to remain open to meet public need and the opportunity for increased business. Less critical businesses, such as clothing or antique shops, may close in moderate or severe weather.

In most severe storms, police and fire departments use specialized vehicles to respond to emergencies. Other workers involved in handling issues pertaining to the inclement weather, such as snow plow operators, report to work, and reporters and local elected officials stay on duty to serve the public.

=== Transport ===
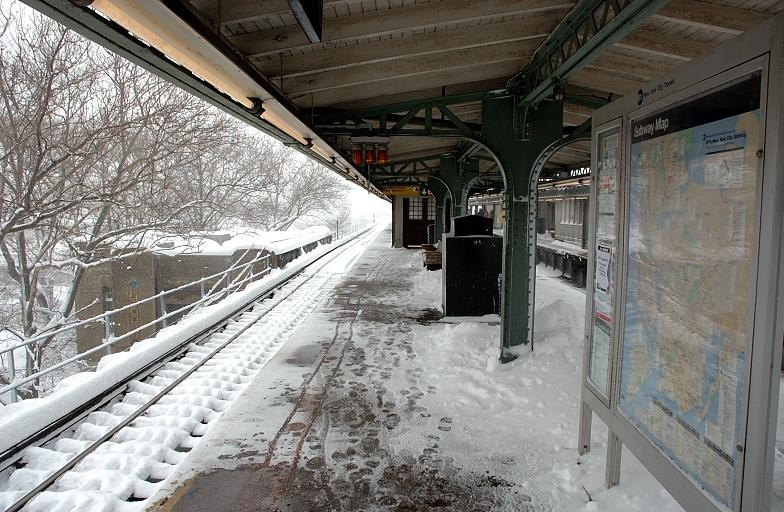
Passenger trains may face a diminished ability to operate in severe snow, like the New York City Subway during the 2006 North American blizzard (pictured).

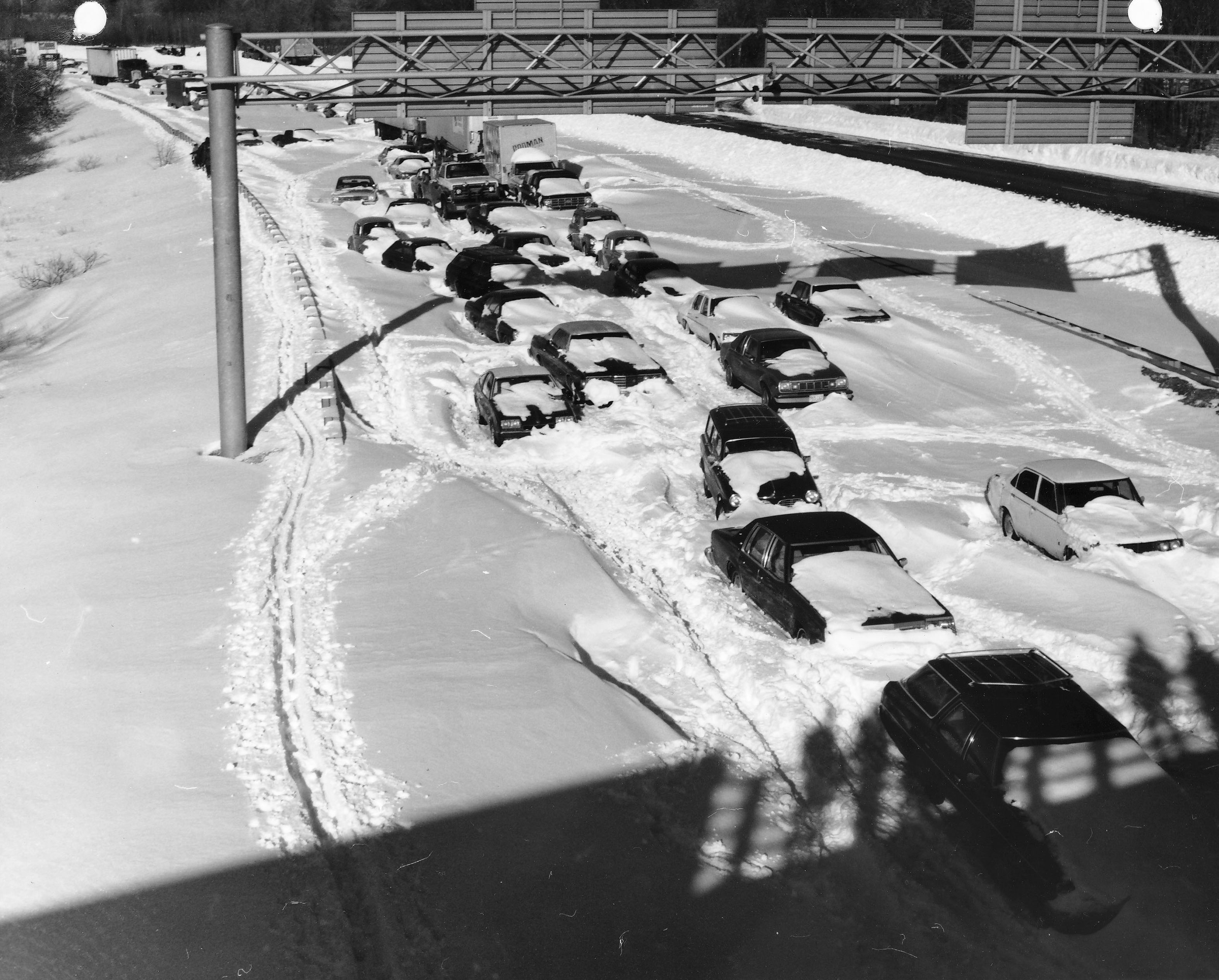
Cars and trucks stuck in snow on Route 128 near Needham, Massachusetts during the 1978 Northeastern United States blizzard

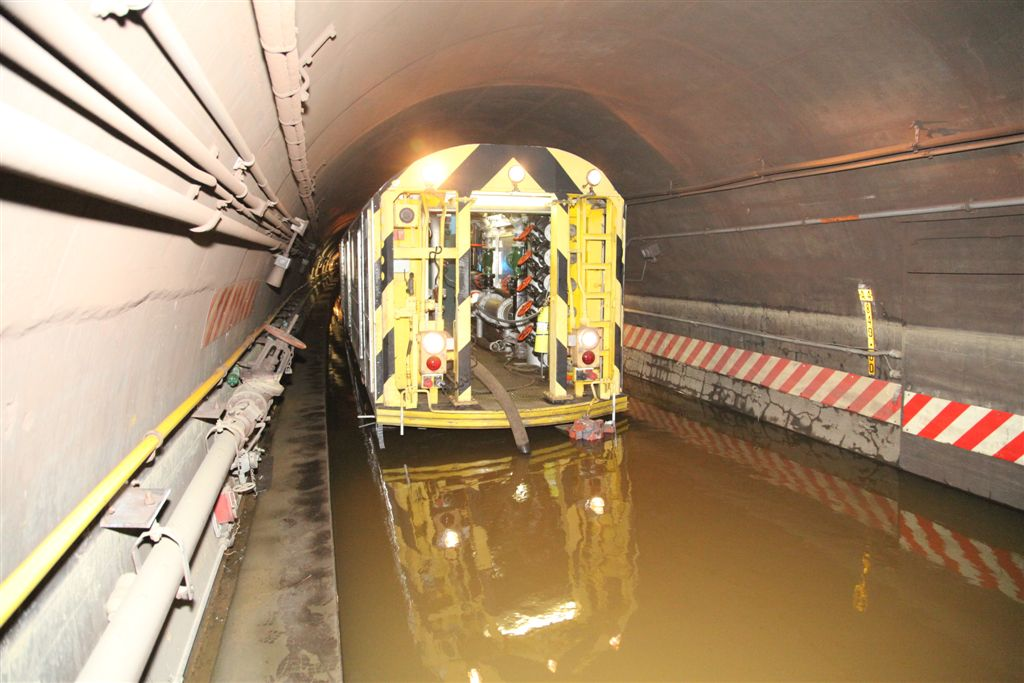
Subway Train in a flooded tunnel after Hurricane Sandy

In severe weather, airlines, rail service providers, bus operators, and other public transport may cancel or reduce services. Route impassability, airport closure, employees' safety, and public safety may result in such action. However, some modes of transport are more prone to severe weather than others, and different forms of bad weather have different impacts.

In air travel, the decision is often based on the guidelines of the country's civil aviation authority, such as the Federal Aviation Administration (FAA) in the United States.

Even when the service does operate, unplanned delays are possible, as operators take extra precautions or routes are congested. The level of service provided may be diminished due to a lower demand for service, fewer operators being available, or fewer passable routes. Yet sometimes demand for public transport may increase as more commuters choose not to drive their own vehicles.

In particularly hot weather, rail vehicles may be delayed by the expansion of the steel tracks.

Public transport may continue to operate on main arteries, though they may still experience delays. Buses that operate on secondary roads, especially those that are narrow or difficult to negotiate, may either be completely cancelled or diverted to a main road.

Although bad weather generally has little effect on an underground subway system in a major metropolitan area, electricity outages and flooding may disrupt services. For example, on August 8, 2007, following a tornado in Brooklyn in New York City, the New York City Subway flooded, causing all trains to grind to a halt during rush hour. Increased demand may result from employers and schools clearing out in anticipation of a tropical cyclone, hurricane, or other severe weather system as people turn to the subway when other modes of transport are threatened. In some cases, including Hurricane Sandy in 2012, transit services may be totally suspended for the storm's duration.

=== Tourism ===
Tourism is particularly sensitive to weather-related disruptions, especially in destinations that rely heavily on outdoor or nature-based activities. Adverse weather or inclement weather conditions, such as heavy rain, storms, heatwaves, or poor visibility, can lead to the cancellation or rescheduling of tours, activities, and even entire holidays. While such cancellations are often framed as safety precautions, they also reflect the broader vulnerability of the tourism sector to short-term weather variability. In many cases, weather disruptions do not lead to outright cancellations but rather modifications to planned activities. For instance, a snorkelling tour may be replaced with a cultural or educational experience, or a boat trip may be rescheduled to a calmer day. The capacity of businesses to adapt often depends on their size, location, and resource availability. In contrast to schools or workplaces, tourism-related cancellations are rarely standardized by national policies. Instead, decisions are often made at the operator level, and may depend on factors like forecast severity, tourist demographics, and type of activities offered.

== See also ==
- State of emergency
- Rainout (sports)
