= Håøya =

Håøya may refer to:

== Places ==
- Håøya, Akershus, an island in Frogn Municipality in Akershus county, Norway
- Håøya, Svalbard, an island in the territory of Svalbard, Norway
- Håøya, Telemark, an island in Porsgrunn Municipality in Telemark county, Norway
- Håøya, Vestfold, an island in Færder Municipality in Vestfold county, Norway
