= Bogstadvannet =

Lake in Norway

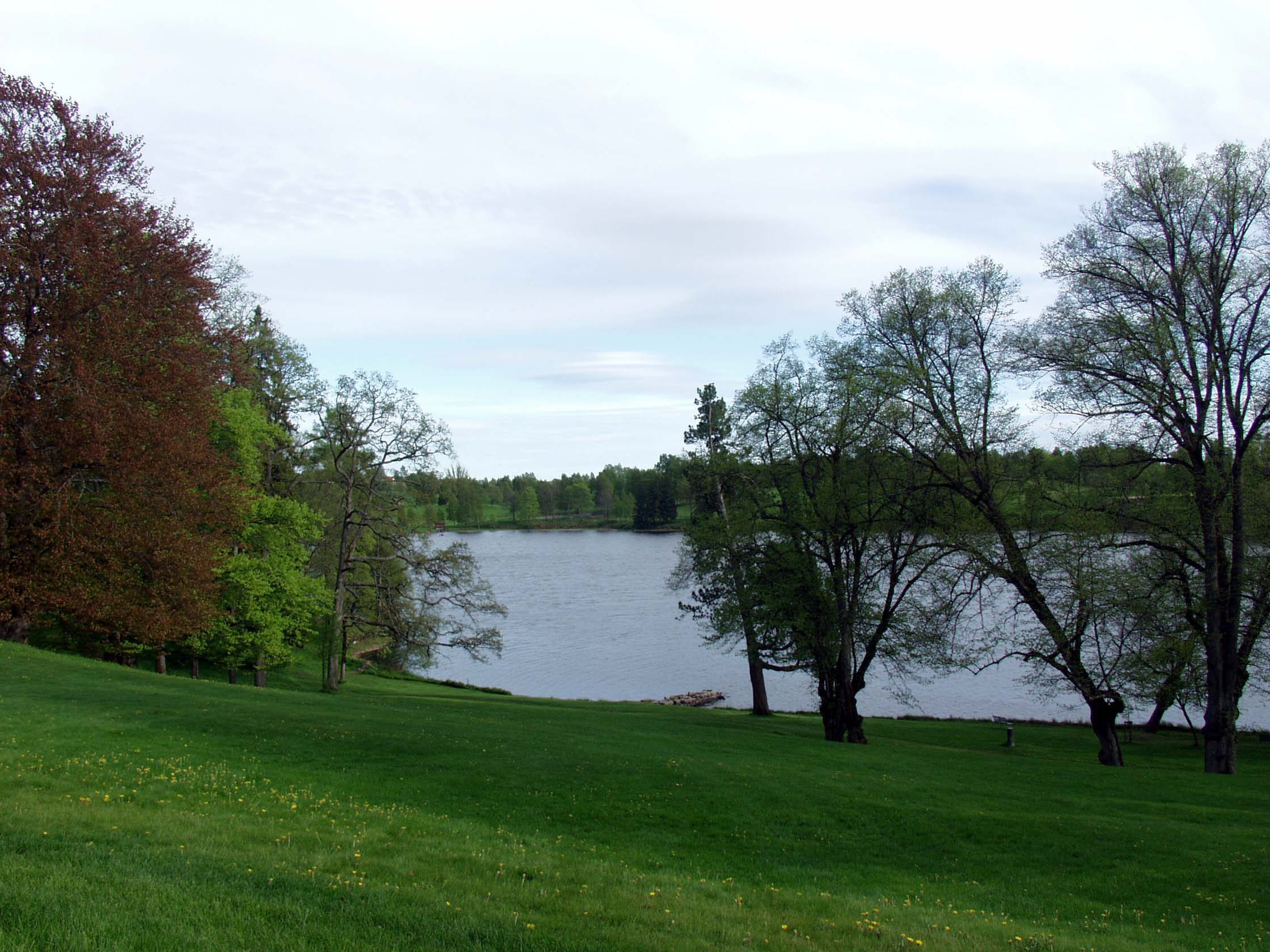
- View of the lake from Bogstad manor

- Location within Akershus
- Location: Oslo and Bærum, Norway
- Coordinates: 59.97°N 10.62°E
- Primary inflows: Sørkedalselven
- Primary outflows: Lysakerelven
- Basin countries: Norway
- Max. length: 2 km (1.2 mi)
- Max. width: 0.5 km (0.31 mi)
- Surface area: 1 km^{2} (0.39 sq mi)
- Max. depth: 9.5 m (31 ft)
- Surface elevation: 145 m (476 ft)
- Settlements: Oslo

Bogstadvannet (English: Lake Bogstad) is a lake between the city of Oslo and the municipality of Bærum, Akershus, Norway. It is part of Sørkedalsvassdraget, which in turn is part of Oslomarkvassdraget.

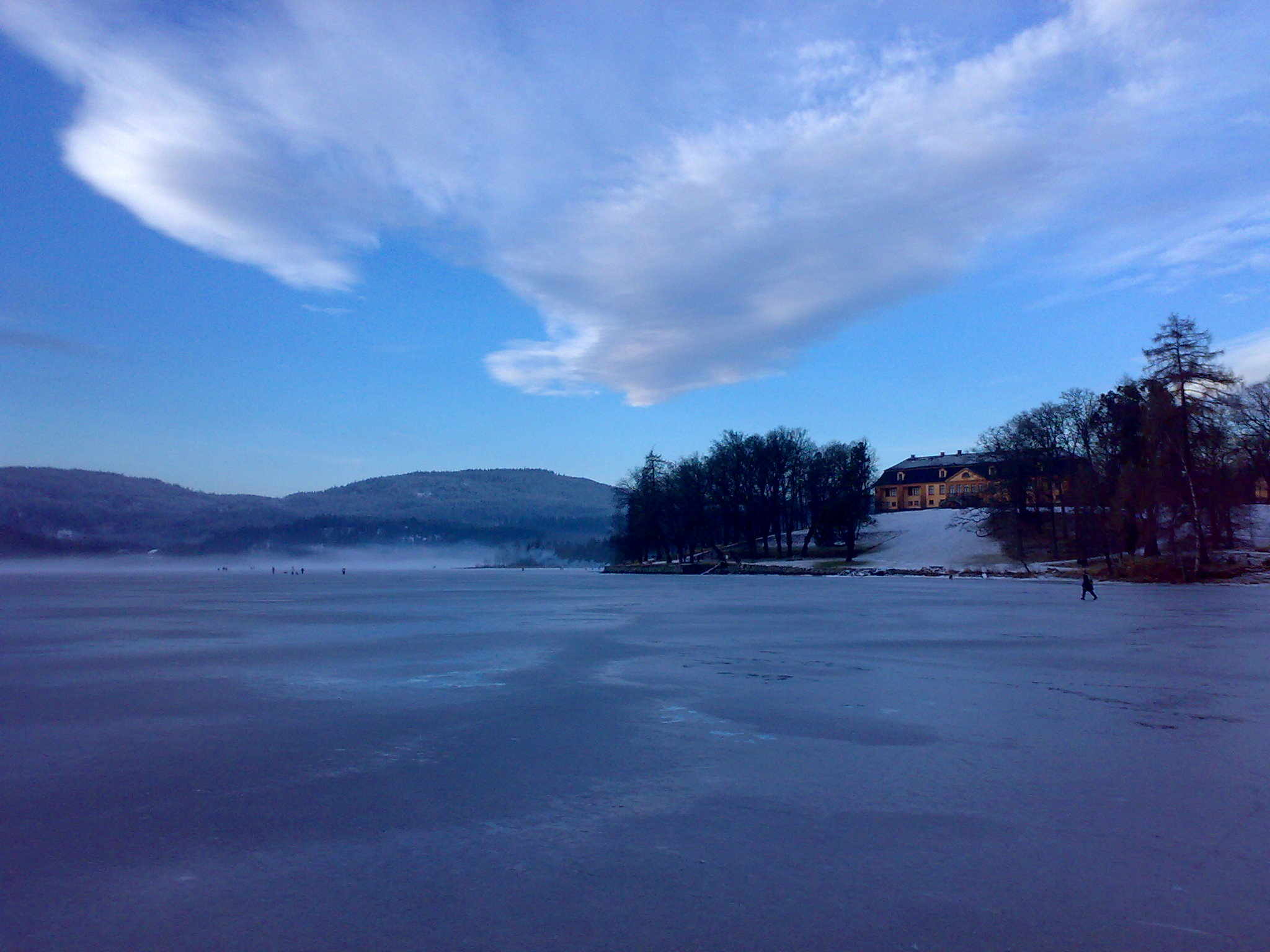
View of the manor from the lake during winter

Originally, the lake was named Få(d)vannet after an earlier name for Lysakerelven, but has since taken the name of the Bogstad estate and manor, on the east shore of the lake. In addition to the manor, Norway's first 18-hole golf course (from 1924) is owned and operated by Oslo Golfklubb on the south shore and a large camping ground (Bogstad Camping) on the east shore south of the manor. The lake is a popular destination for swimming and sunbathing in the summer. In winter, inhabitants from all Oslo go skiing and skating on the lake and the surrounding area when conditions permit. It is also a venue for Christiania Roklub, a rowing club.

During the occupation of Norway by Nazi Germany from 1940 to 1945, the camping ground was used for military barracks. Structures from this time remained under Norwegian military administration until the 1950s.

The lake is shallow with significant flow. Algae growth is not significant, making for good bathing conditions. The environmental condition has remained stable for at least the last 20 years.

The commercial development of Bogstadvannet was largely due to the works of the Bogstad estate. The Leucht family, succeeded by the Anker family, built a significant forestry enterprise in the area, and for many years the lake served as part of the waterway for floating lumber to mills along Lysakerelven.
