= Hjelm Waage Thurn-Basberg =

Norwegian resistance member (1917–2006)

Hjelm Waage Thurn-Basberg (3 November 1917 – 29 November 2006) was a Norwegian resistance member during World War II. He fled Norway twice due to his resistance to the German occupation, but returned both times to work with intelligence for the British Secret Intelligence Service (MI6).

== World War II ==
Thurn-Basberg was born in Kristiania. When World War II reached Norway in 1940, he fought for his country as part of the Norwegian Campaign. When fighting subsided he joined the Norwegian resistance movement Milorg. He fled to Sweden in 1943, but soon returned to participate in illegal radio and intelligence work for the Norwegian Secret Intelligence Service. His nom de guerre was "Per", a common Norwegian variant of the name Peter.

Thurn-Basberg was first based in Kristiansand to work with Oluf Reed-Olsen. In the autumn of 1943 he operated the radio station codenamed Meton together with Reed-Olsen in Lommedalen. After fleeing again, to England, in January 1944 via Sweden, he received parachute training and returned to Bærum. Thurn-Basberg was then in charge of the radio station Gullfaks, named after Gullfaxi of Norse mythology. It was operated from different places in Bærumsmarka and Nordmarka until the liberation on 8 May 1945. He especially became known for a telegram sent in June 1944, where he described how the Wehrmacht believed false reports that the Allies were planning an invasion in central Norway, and thus kept large German forces away from the actual war theatre in continental Europe.

== Later life ==
After the war Thurn-Basberg co-founded a Norwegian stay-behind group, as a part of the Cold War. He was active in this group for 28 years. In his civil life he worked as a small-scale businessman, with import of French wine (inherited from his father) as well as miscellaneous gas station equipment. He lived in Ullern, Oslo, and died in November 2006, 89 years old.
