= Christian Roy Kaldager =

Royal Norwegian Air Force major general

- Born: March 18, 1908; Baltimore, Maryland
- Died: June 23, 2005 (aged 97)
- Allegiance: Norwegian
- Service / branch: Royal Norwegian Air Force
- Rank: Major General
- Commands: 330 Squadron
- Battles / wars: World War II

Christian Roy Kaldager (18 March 1908 – 23 June 2005) was a Royal Norwegian Air Force major general born in Baltimore, Maryland.

Kaldager graduated from the Norwegian Naval Academy in 1931 and from the Royal Norwegian Navy Air Academy in 1932. From 1936 to 1941, he was a captain in the merchant fleet. from 1942 he participated in the Royal Norwegian Navy Air Service of World War II as the leader of 330 Squadron.

Kaldager was promoted to colonel in 1953 and major general in 1960. He was inspector-general of the Royal Norwegian Air Force from 1957, and in 1962 he became the leader of the United Nations air force in The Congo. From August 1963 to December 1963 he was the commander of the entire United Nations Operation in the Congo. He succeeded Kebbede Guebre and was succeeded by Johnson Aguiyi-Ironsi. He was the acting chief of staff of the Norwegian High Command from 1964 to 1968, commander of Akershus Fortress from 1968 to 1973 and the director of the Norwegian Defence Education Command from 1969 to 1970.
