= Lysakerfjorden =

Fjord in Akershus, Norway

Coordinates: 59°54′N 10°39′E

Lysakerfjorden (English: Lysaker Fjord) is an arm of the Oslofjord in Norway. It starts at the mouth of the Lysaker River, and is bordered by the peninsulas Snarøya to the west and Bygdøy to the east.
