= Håøya, Telemark =

Island in Telemark, Norway

Håøya
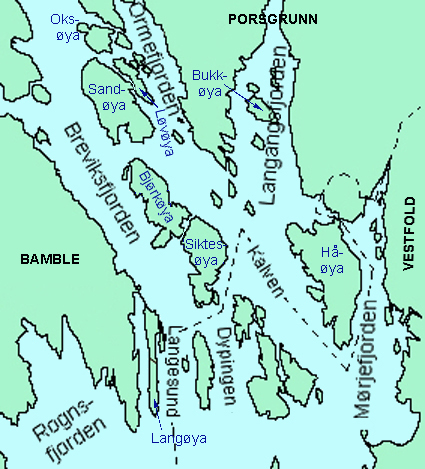
- Håøya seen together with other islands outside Porsgrunn
- Interactive map of the island

Geography
- Location: Telemark, Norway
- Coordinates: 59.0215°N 9.8219°E
- Area: 2.4 km^{2} (0.93 sq mi)
- Length: 2.8 km (1.74 mi)
- Width: 1.5 km (0.93 mi)
- Highest elevation: 141 m (463 ft)
- Highest point: Storefjell

Administration
- Norway
- County: Telemark
- Municipality: Porsrunn Municipality

Håøya is an island in Porsgrunn Municipality in Telemark county, Norway. The 2.4-square-kilometre (0.93 sq mi) island is located in the Langesundsfjorden, about 5 kilometres (3.1 mi) east of the town of Langesund (in Bamble Municipality).

About 1.8 square kilometres (0.69 sq mi) of the island (most of the island) is protected as a nature reserve. Håøya nature reserve was established in 2002 to preserve a coastal landscape with a large variety of little affected forest types, including the southernmost natural beech forest in the country.

Historically, the island had permanent residents and its own school. Today, there are no permanent residents, but there are many holiday cottages for vacationers. The island is known for having summer camps arranged by Oluf Reed-Olsen.

== See also ==
- List of islands of Norway
