= On-call room =

Type of room in a hospital

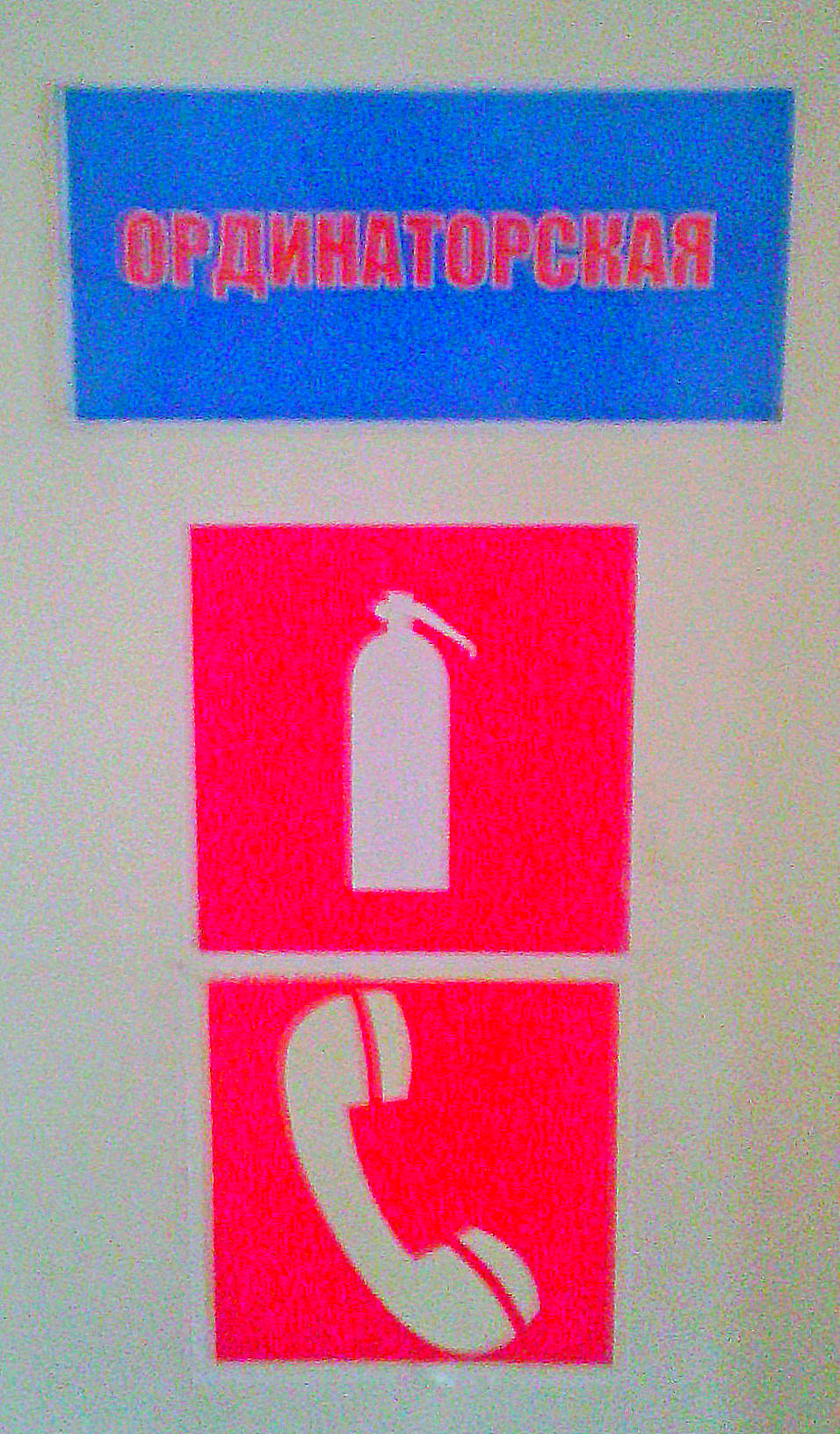
On-call room in Russia

An on-call room, sometimes referred to as the doctors' mess, is a room in a hospital with either a couch or a bunkbed intended for staff to rest in while they are on call or due to be.

In the European Community, the 2003 extension of the working time directive to junior doctors and the ruling that on-call time counts as working hours has resulted in the introduction of shift work for hospital medical staff, thereby eliminating the requirements for on-call rooms. A similar change in hospital working hours for interns was implemented in the United States in 2011, but senior residents continue to do 24-hour call. Accreditation Council for Graduate Medical Education regulations require that residents on call be provided with "adequate sleep facilities" which are "safe, quiet, and private".

== See also ==
- Mess, a military term for the place where people eat or socialize
