= Lysakerelven =

Lysakerelven Lysakerelva Fåd (old Norse; meaning "border")
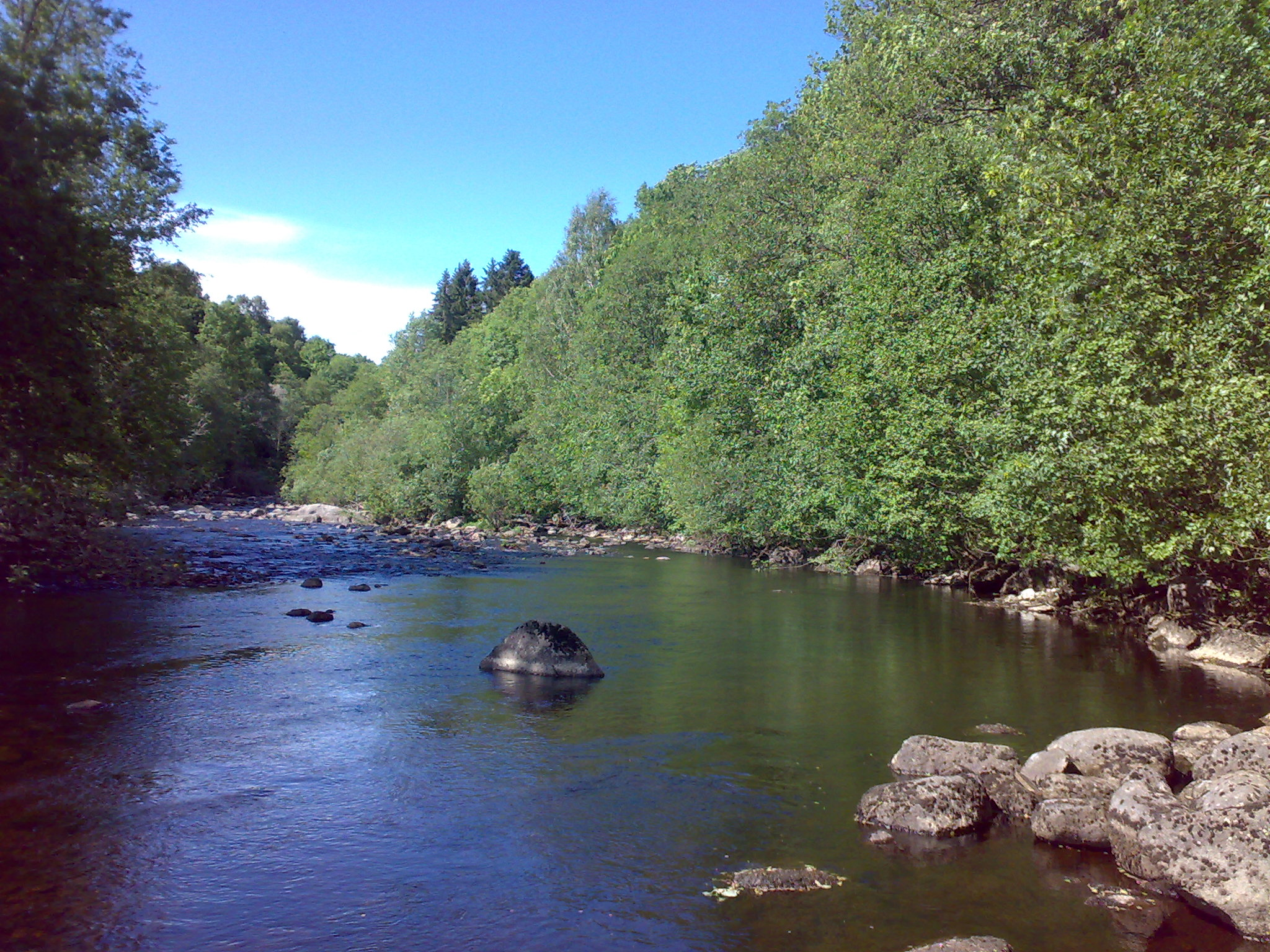
- A quiet section of the river
- Etymology: named after the farm Lysaker

Location
- Country: Norway
- Region: Østlandet
- District: Viken
- Municipality: Oslo and Bærum

Physical characteristics
- Source: Bogstadvannet
  - location: Oslo, Norway
  - coordinates: 59.9670622°N 10.6206894°E
  - elevation: 145 m (476 ft)
- Mouth: Lysakerfjorden
  - location: Lysaker, Akershus, Norway
  - coordinates: 59.9114493°N 10.6417608°E
  - elevation: 0 m (0 ft)
- Length: 7.4 km (4.6 mi)
- Basin size: 178 km^{2} (69 sq mi)
- Discharge
  - average: 4.0 m^{3}/s (140 cu ft/s)
  - minimum: 0.5 m^{3}/s (18 cu ft/s)
  - maximum: 80 m^{3}/s (2,800 cu ft/s)

Basin features
- River system: Oslomarkvassdragene, more specifically Sørkedalsvassdraget

Lysakerelven (also known as Lysakerelva, English: Lysaker River) is a river in Norway that forms the boundary between Oslo Municipality (the national capitol) and Bærum Municipality.

The river by this name has its source in Bogstadvannet, though the source is further up, at Langlivann, and Søndre and Nordre Heggelivann in Oslomarka, the forests surrounding Oslo. Consequently, it is considered part of Oslomarkvassdragene, the river system flowing through these forests, and more specifically Sørkedalsvassdraget, the valley above Bogstadvannet. It flows out into Lysakerfjorden, part of Oslofjorden near Lysaker.

== History ==
There is evidence that the river has been used for mills since the 12th century, and probably earlier. The old name of the river was Få (Old Norse: Fǫð), which means "fence" or "boundary". In the 18th century, Bogstadvannet was also known as Faavandet.

By 1660, twelve farms had claims to the hydromechanical power generated by the river. These farms, several of which have since given names to neighborhoods in Aker (now Oslo) and Bærum, were:

- In Aker, Voksen, Nordre Rød, Søndre Rød, Ullern, Øraker, and Sollerud
- In Bærum, Fossum, Grini, Øvre Vold, Nedre Vold, Jar, and Lysaker

From Bogstadvannet going south, there are several sites of historical significance.

=== Osdammen ===
Osdammen was a dam with a resident mill for the sawmill at Bogstad. There is evidence that there was a sawmill at this site as early as the 16th century. Sources also suggested it delivered lumber for reconstruction in London after the Great Fire in 1666. The mill was in operation until 1915, when the owners at Bogstad agreed with the mill owner at Grini, Løvenskiold, to shut down the mill in return for enough electricity to set up a sawmill at Zinoerbrua.

=== Fossum Jernverk ===
A mill with a finery forge and trip hammer was established here around 1780 by Conrad Clausen, the owner of Bærum Jernverk (Bærum Ironworks). The forge was situated on the Bærum side and measured 30 by 19 Norwegian ells (about 18 meters by 12 meters). It had an annual capacity of about 250 tons of wrought iron. The pig iron originated in Southern Norway, whence it was transported by ship and unloaded at the dock at Vækerø before being pulled by horse and cart to the mill.

== Recreation ==
The river is 7.4 kilometres (4.6 mi) long, with a total fall of 145 metres (476 ft). It includes several smaller rapids and waterfalls, the most prominent of these being Granfossen, often known as Fåbrofossen. In later years, the area around the river has been developed as a recreational area, and a footpath follows the entire length of the river on both the Oslo and Bærum sides, so that it is possible to hike around the entire river, from the Oslofjord to Bogstadvannet on one side, and back on the other. Further, the footpath connects to the network of paths throughout the forests outside Oslo, and those around the Oslofjord. The path on the Oslo side is also suitable for cycling. The terrain and scenery is quite varied along the footpaths, ranging from significant hills to flat and undulating stretches. Some of the rapids are strong enough that the river is used for kayak training; other places swimming has become popular.

== Natural resources ==
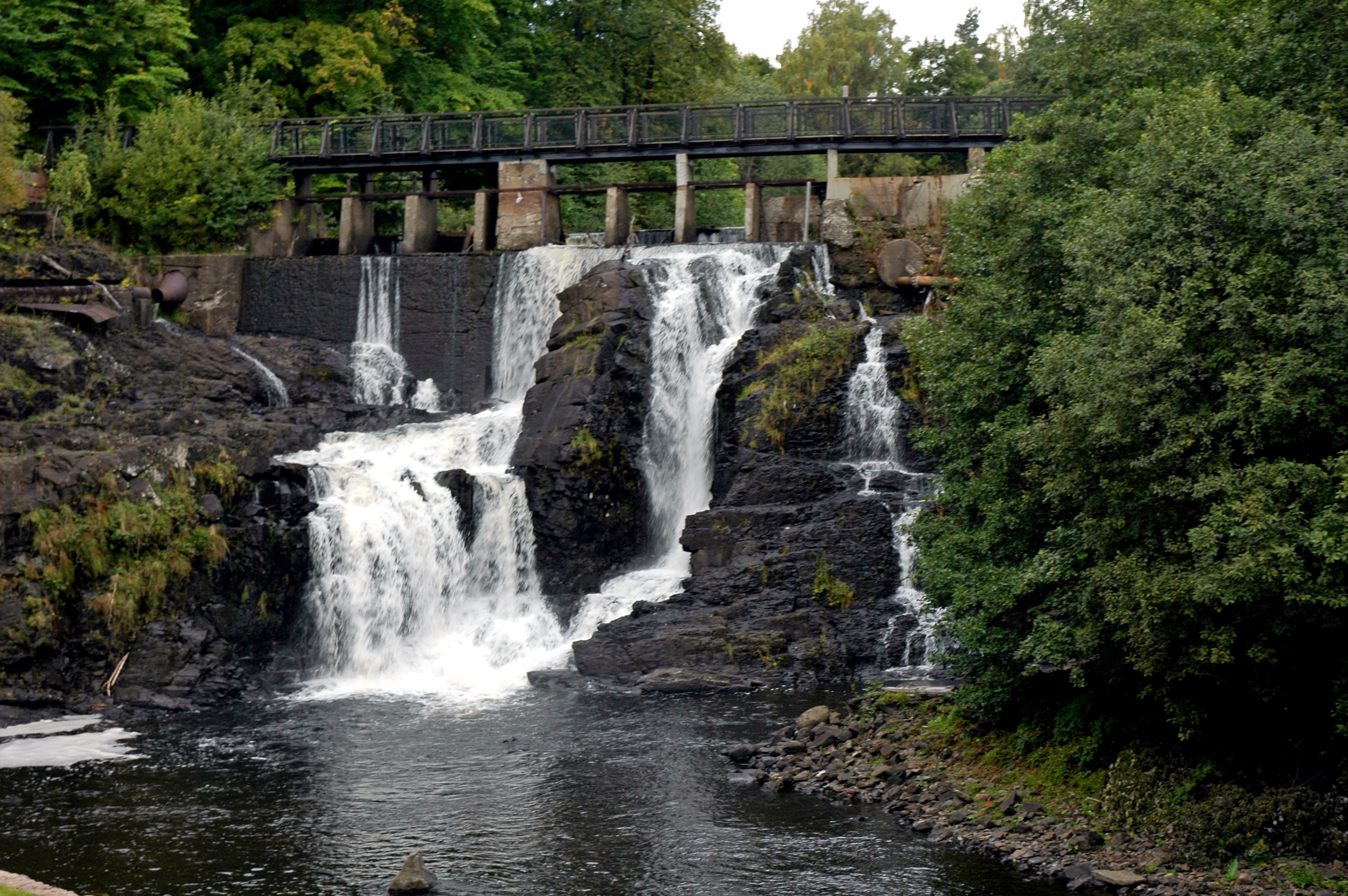
Fåbrofossen in the fall

Lysakerelven runs through a varied landscape. The basin consists mainly of spruce forest, but in the area around Bogstadvannet there is also deciduous forest. From this source, the river at first meanders to about Grinidammen, and then carves an increasingly deep valley into the landscape, and at the stretch around and south of Jar, it forms a canyon with a few natural pools occurring along the way. Historically, a number of mills and also manufacturing facilities were based around the river south of Bogstad, but these have largely given way to large residential areas that are part of the Oslo and Bærum conurbation.

The banks of the river include a wide variety of plant life. Though environmental conditions in the river have improved significantly in the last few decades, efforts are underway to improve it further. A study in 2006 recommended that the area be designed a "very important" natural resource, with most areas set aside as a natural reservation. The findings showed that the area around the river contained a rich diversity of plant and animal species, including 27 that are on the national IUCN Red List. A good variety of fish thrive in the river, and limited recreational fishing is permitted, particularly for trout. 68 different species of birds have been identified, among them the Dendrocopos minor (Lesser Spotted Woodpecker), which is redlisted in Norway; and the area is considered an essential habitat for passerine birds in the metropolitan Oslo area. The area serves as a wildlife thoroughfare for mammals from the forests to the coastal regions, including moose and deer, who also graze there. Squirrels, red fox, badgers and other smaller rodents make their homes in the area.

The redlisted species found in the area include 2 species of vascular plants, 8 mosses, 13 fungi, 2 insects, and 1 species of bird. Fishing is allowed in Lysakerelven with the necessary permits only. Two species of fish dominate the river: brown trout and common minnow. salmon and sea trout will make their way from the ocean up to Fåbrofossen, whereas perch, common roach, northern pike, and common bleak will swim down from Bogstadvannet

== Environmental statistics ==
Classification of habitats around Lysakerelven
Type of habitat	Area	% of total
Alnus incana and Prunus padus mixed forest	0.74 hectares (1.8 acres)	1.0%
Boreonemoral mixed forest	23.8 hectares (59 acres)	32.5%
Cultivated meadowland	0.1 hectares (0.25 acres)	0.1%
Dams	2.16 hectares (5.3 acres)	3%
Important creek area	27.0 hectares (67 acres)	36.8%
Natural grazing	0.32 hectares (0.79 acres)	0.4%
Old deciduous forest	3.86 hectares (9.5 acres)	5.3%
Rich southern deciduous forest	15.3 hectares (38 acres)	20.9%
Waterfall mist zone	0.01 hectares (0.025 acres)	-%
Totals	73.3 hectares (181 acres)	

Classification of area by environmental importance
Classification	Area	Percent of total
Very important	23.93 hectares (59.1 acres)	32.66%
Important	44.44 hectares (109.8 acres)	61.25%
Locally important	4.46 hectares (11.0 acres)	6.09%
