= Øverland, Bærum =

Recreational area in Bærum, Norway known for its arboretum

Coordinates: 59.9317°N 10.5617°E

Location of Øverland in Norway
Location of Øverland in Akershus

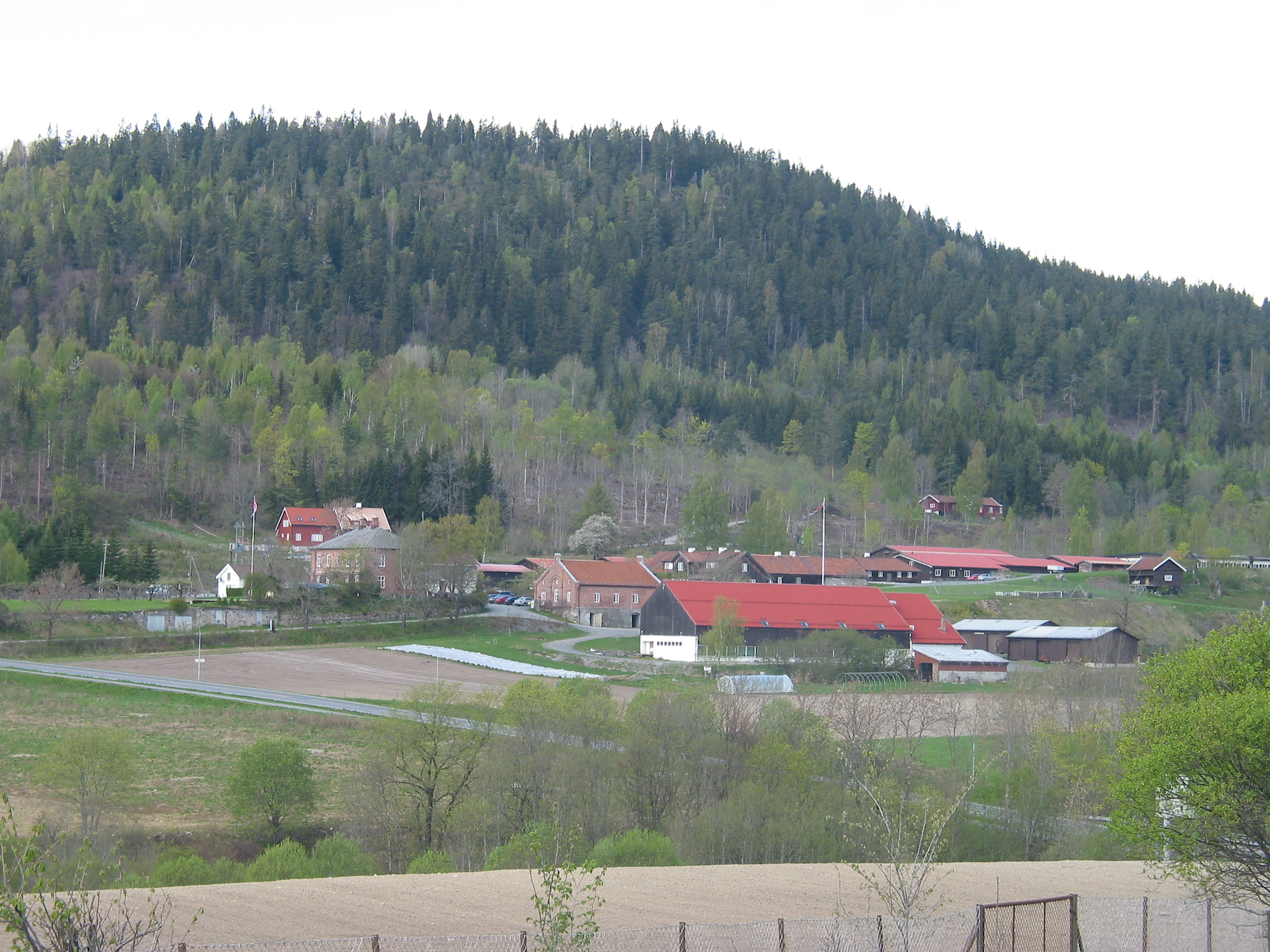
Overview of Øverland. Bærumsmarka in the background.

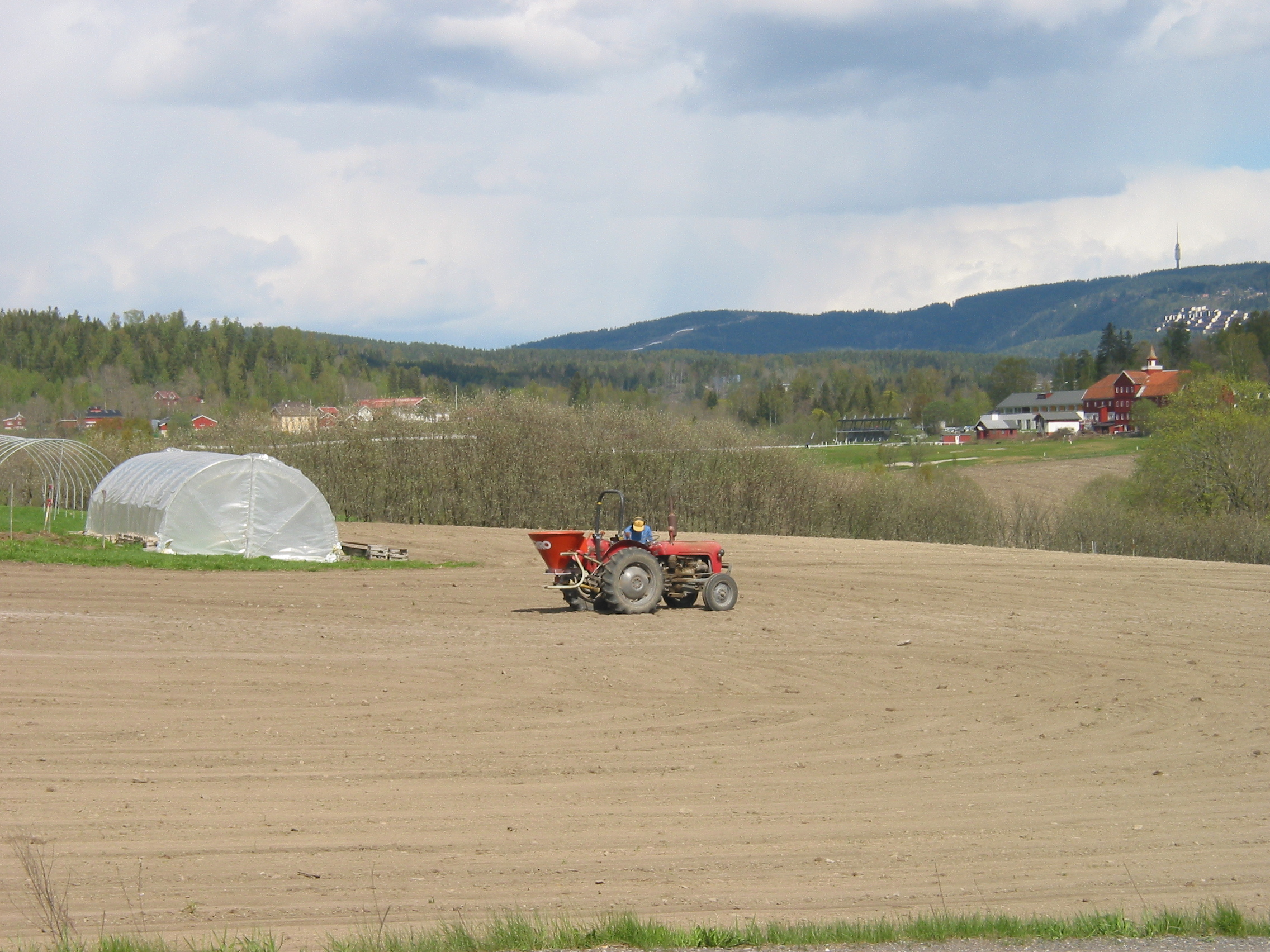
A farmer at Eastern Øverland farm. Tryvannstårnet seen in the background.

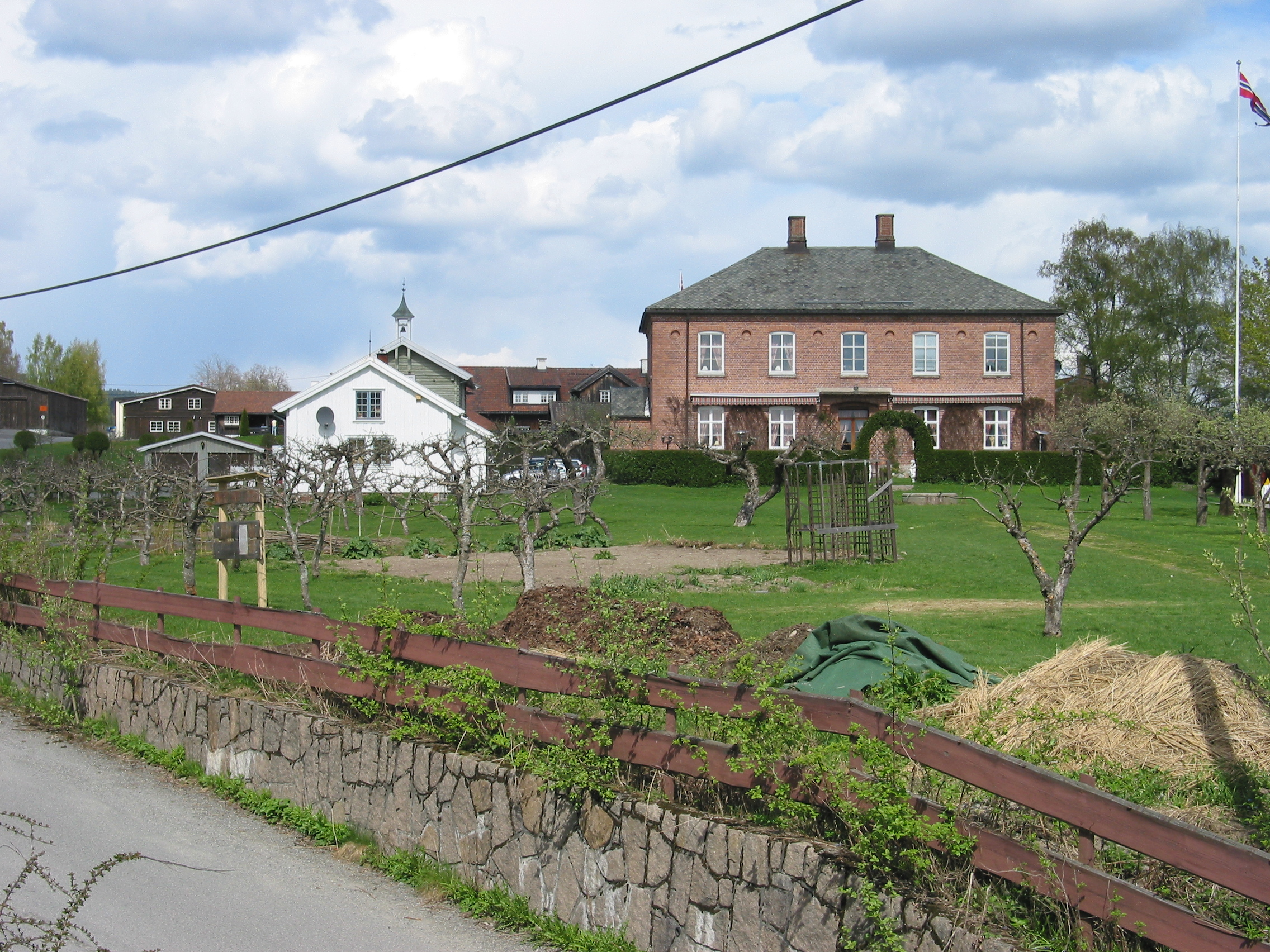
Western Øverland farm

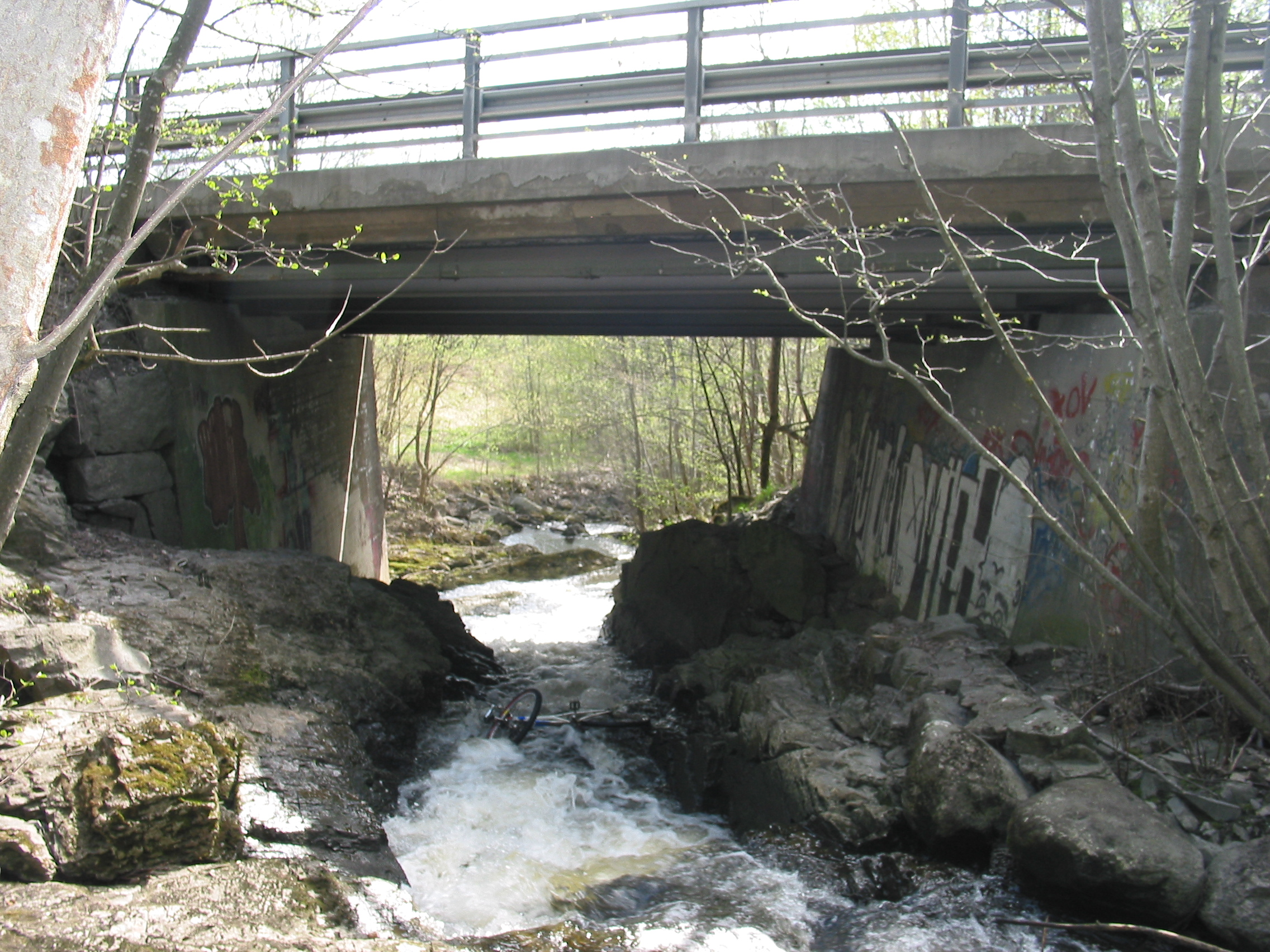
Øverlandselva running under the Norwegian National Road 168

Øverland is an area in Bærum, Norway. Named after the local farm, Øverland is also known as a recreational area and for its arboretum. It has lent its name to the river Øverlandselva.

== Geography ==
The area is located north of Haslum, west of Hosle and south of Bærumsmarka.

The river Øverlandselva runs past Øverland farm, whence the river got its name. A bridge over it was mentioned as early as 1594 by Jens Nilssøn, and it is considered a part of the so-called Pilgrim's Route. The river continues south through Haslum before turning southwest near Løkeberg, ultimately emptying into the lake Engervannet at Blommenholm. The southernmost section has formerly been called Løkebergelva.

== History and usage ==
The name of the area is taken from the farm Øverland. Historic spellings of the name include Efraland and Øfraland, used around the fourteenth century, as well as Offuerlandt (1578), Øffueland (1594) and Øffverland (1723). The farm was owned by the Church of Norway. Following the Reformation of 1536, parts of it was overturned to the Crown, whereas two other parts were owned by Oslo Hospital and Nesøygodset. Later splits and consolidations followed, until the last consolidation in 1912, when the farm reached its former size. In 1943 it was split again, into Østre and Vestre (Eastern and Western) Øverland. Vestre Øverland was taken over by the Royal Norwegian Society for Development.

In 1826 the farm was registered as having 7 horses, 28 cattle and 32 sheep. In 1939 this number had risen to 9 horses and 69 cattle; sheep had been discontinued but ducks and chickens had been added. The farm is also used for fruit cultivation. In older times limestone extraction and burning was conducted northeast of the farm, at Steinskogen. Limestone burning is an old characteristic of Bærum municipality, and a lime kiln is the inspiration for its coat of arms. Lime from Øverland was used at Akershus Fortress in 1629 and 1661. Around the same time, the farm also operated a nearby sawmill.

In 1957 the Royal Norwegian Society for Development, in cooperation with the Norwegian Forest Owners Association, established an arboretum slightly west of the farm. The purpose was to study how different tree species coped with the Norwegian climate. The universities of Oslo and Ås as well as Skogforsk now runs the arboretum together with the Society for Development. Further west, the Godthaab centre for physical rehabilitation was raised in 1925, partially on land bought from Øverland. The centre was used as a Lebensborn facility during the German occupation of Norway. In the east, part of the Østre Øverland territory has been used for a golf course.

== Transportation ==
In the interwar period, the extension of the Røa Line to Øverland was considered; the line would be constructed via Østerås to Øverland, continuing from there to Lommedalen in northwestern Bærum. The line reached Bærum in 1948 with the opening of Grini station, which was ultimately closed in 1995. At the time of the last extension in 1972, the original schedule was to build rails to Hosle; this did not materialize and the construction stopped east of Hosle, at Østerås station.

Øverland is served by the line 143 of the Ruter bus network; the proximate bus station is named Åsterud. The bus station is located on the Norwegian National Road 168, which runs south of Øverland farm and arboretum.
