= Kåre Siem =

Norwegian musician and writer

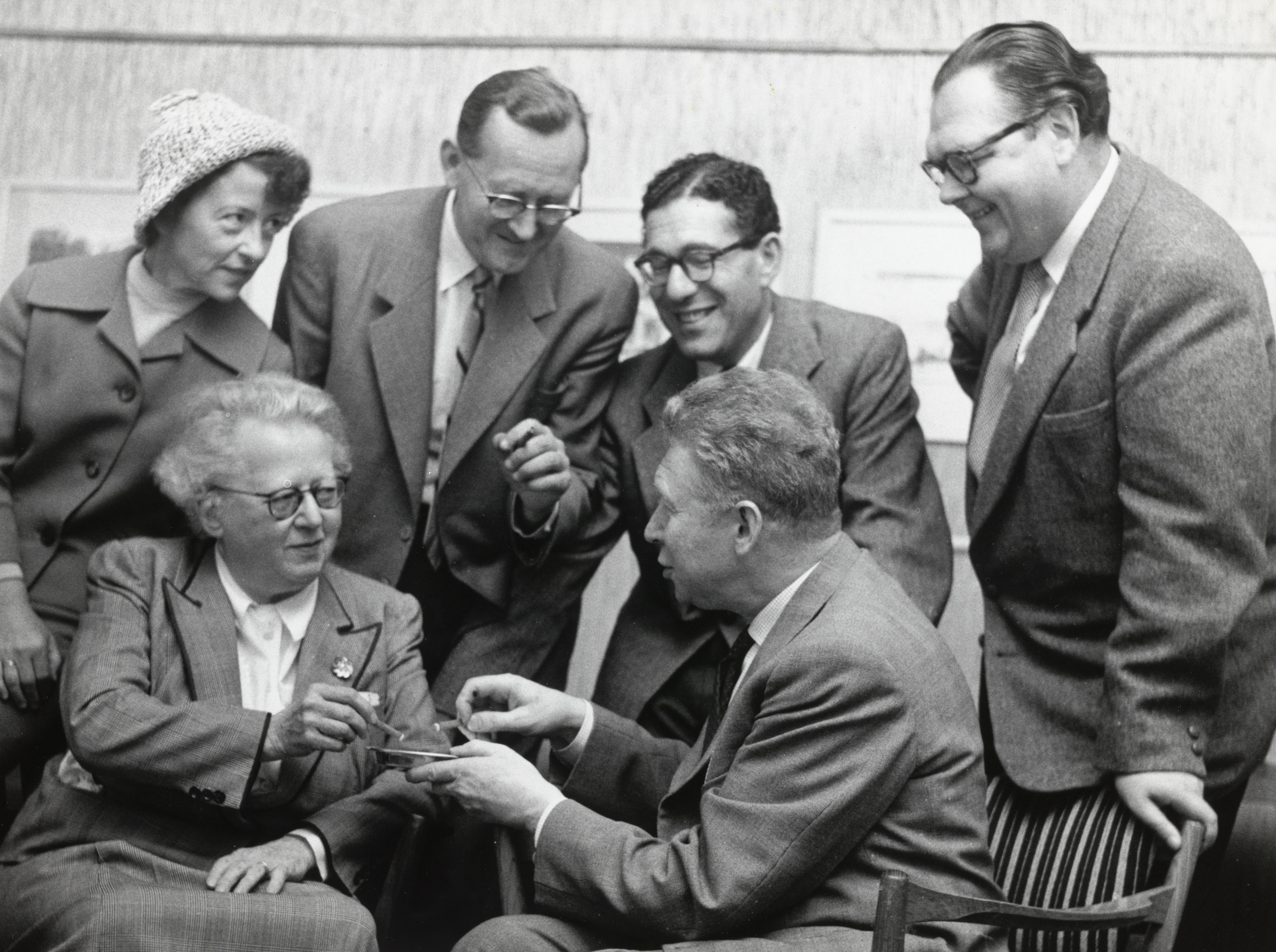
- Kåre Siem (right) in 1958, with the board of Ny Musikk
- Born: 8 June 1914; Kristiania, Norway
- Died: 23 June 1986 (aged 72)
- Occupations: Musician and writer
- Spouse: Alice Mürer Siem (m. 1960–1986)
- Relatives: Henny Mürer (sister-in-law)

Kåre Siem (8 June 1914 – 23 June 1986) was a Norwegian musician and writer.

== Early and personal life ==
Siem was born in Kristiania, to Sverre Julius Siem and Elida Annette Antonsen. He was married to Evy Christophersen from 1942 to 1959, and to dancer Alice Mürer from 1960.

== Career ==
Siem studied piano with Nils Larsen, Erling Westher and Ivar Johnsen. He made his concert debut as pianist in 1938, and toured widely in Norway and internationally until his playing career was interrupted by an injured elbow. He started writing music for film and theatre, worked as kapellmeister and conductor, contributed to the Norwegian Broadcasting Corporation, and was a columnist for the newspaper VG. An active participant in the Friends of Folk Song Club, he co-edited several songbooks, jointly with Thorbjørn Egner and Yukon Gjelseth. His publications further include the cookbook Kåres nam-nam-bok for kløner og duster (1974) and the memoir books Bingo (1978) and Klokkene ringer for meg (1979). He was a board member of Musikkens Venner, active in the music copyrights organization TONO, and a board member of Ny Musikk.

== Death ==
He died in Oslo on 23 June 1986. A bust of Siem, sculpted by Per Palle Storm, is located in Oslo.
