= Lars Kobberstad =

CEO of Widerøe

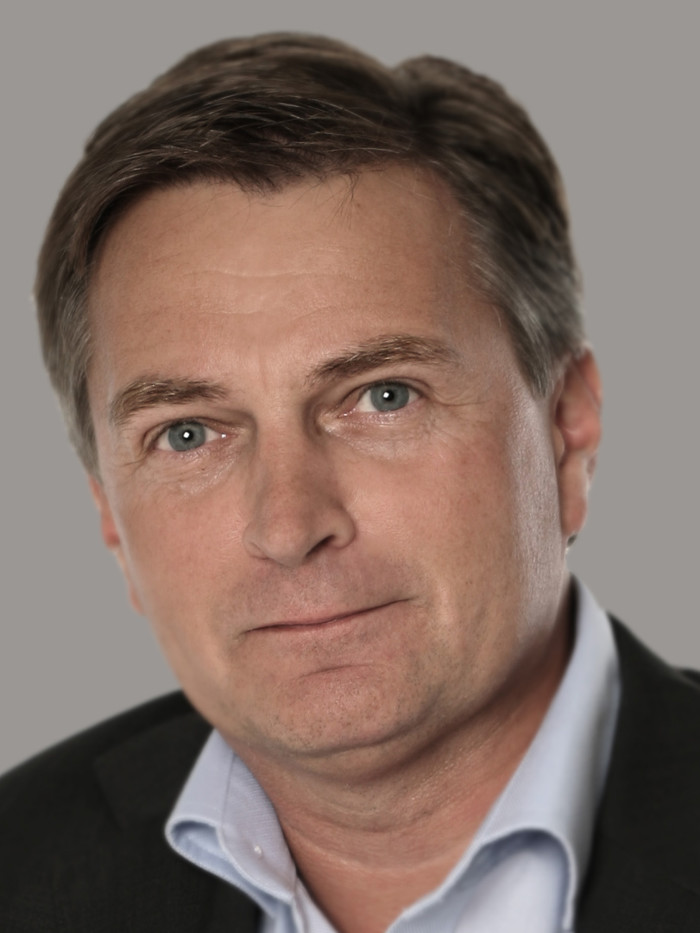

Lars Egil De Lange Kobberstad (born 1962) is a Norwegian businessperson, known as the CEO of Widerøe.

He grew up in Bærum and took his upper secondary education at Dønski. He took his economics education at the University of Augsburg as well as management education at the International Institute for Management Development. He was hired in Widerøe in 1993, was promoted from chief financial officer to vice president in 2002, and became chief executive officer on 1 August 2008. He succeeded Per Arne Watle.

Business positions
| Preceded by Per Arne Watle | CEO of Widerøe; 2008–present | Incumbent |
