= Øverlandselva =

Øverlandselva Øverlandselven
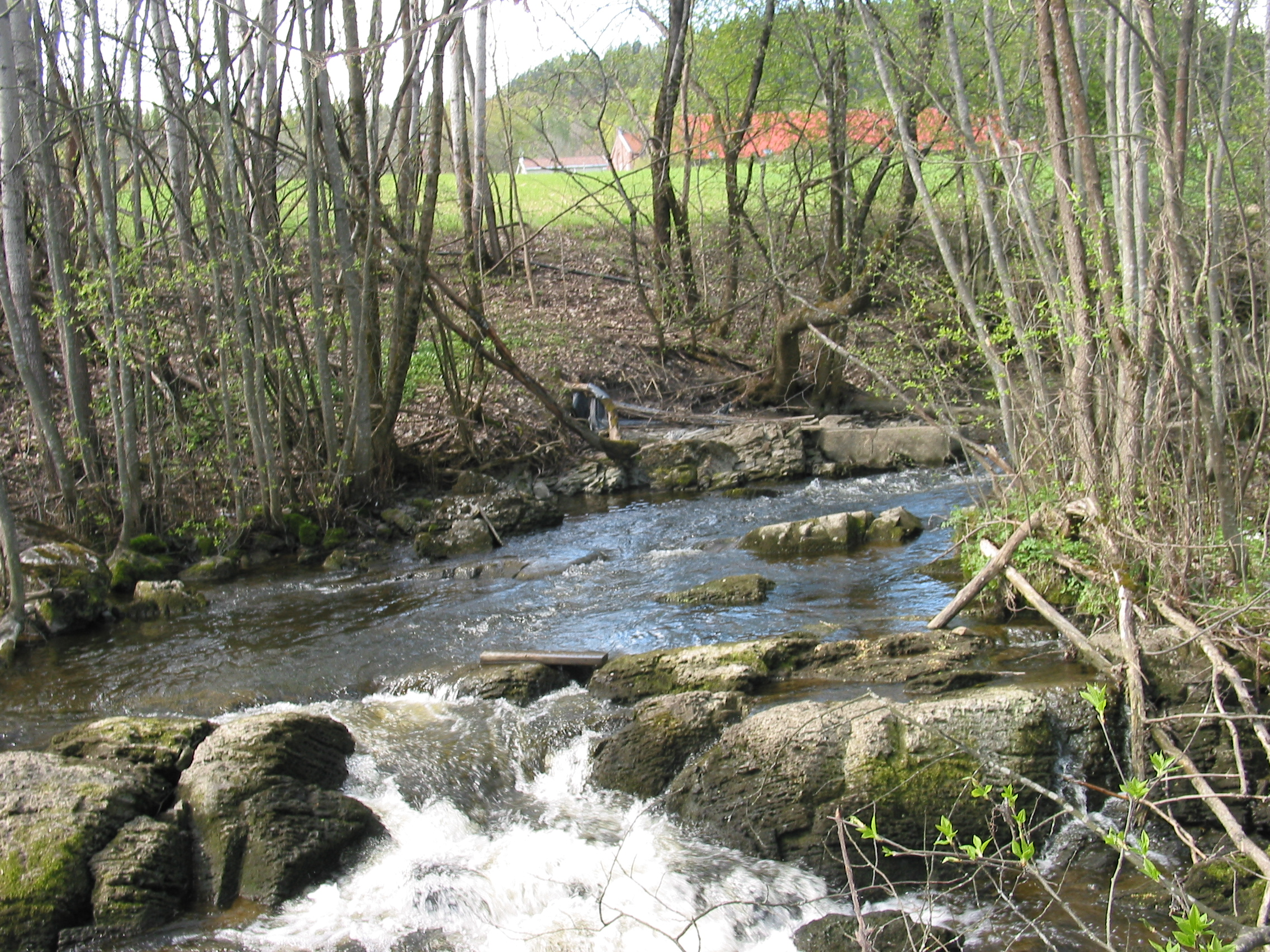
- Øverlandselva with Øverland in the background.
- Etymology: Øverland farm

Location
- Country: Norway
- Region: Eastern Norway
- District: Viken
- Municipality: Bærum

Physical characteristics
- Source
  - location: Øverland, Bærum, Norway
  - coordinates: 59.9404°N 10.5707°E
- Mouth: Engervannet
  - location: Blommenholm, Bærum, Norway
  - coordinates: 59.8990°N 10.5393°E
  - elevation: 4 m (13 ft)

Basin features
- River system: Sandviksvassdraget

Øverlandselva is a river that flows through Bærum, Norway.

It starts near Øverland in northern Bærum, at the confluence of the creeks Seternbekken and Ilabekken. It runs south and southwest, emptying into the eastern side of Engervannet at Blommenholm. A river runs from Engervannet and flows into Sandvikselva, but this portion is called Rønneelva.
