= Halvor Stenstadvold =

Norwegian businessperson and politician

- Born: 6 August 1944 (age 81); Sarpsborg, Norway
- Occupations: Businessperson; Politician
- Spouse: Siri Moursund (1971–present)
- Family: Håkon Stenstadvold (father); Ingeborg Anvik (mother); Karl Stenstadvold (nephew)

Halvor Stenstadvold (born 6 August 1944) is a Norwegian businessperson and politician for the Conservative Party. A political scientist by education, he spent most of his career in the Federation of Norwegian Industries and Orkla Group. He has also been the chair of the Norwegian Broadcasting Corporation, the Research Council of Norway and the Oslo Stock Exchange. As a politician he has been acting mayor of Bærum municipality as well as State Secretary.

== Personal life ==
He was born in Sarpsborg as a son of painter Håkon Stenstadvold (1912–1977) and his wife Ingeborg Anvik. He was a nephew of Karl Stenstadvold. He grew up in Bærum, and lives at Stabekk. He married Siri Moursund (born 1945) in December 1971.

== Career ==
Stenstadvold finished his secondary education in 1962, and studied at the University of Oslo and Columbia University. He graduated with the mag.art. degree (PhD equivalent) in political science in 1971 with a paper Det norske Studentersamfund. En debattanalytisk studie, on the Norwegian Students' Society. He had chaired the Norwegian Students' Society himself in the spring of 1969. In 1973 he released An Approach to Political Interlocutions together with Knut Midgaard and Arild Underdal. Many years later he headed the committee that produced the Norwegian Official Report 26 of 1991. He has also been editor-in-chief of the conservative periodical Minerva.

Stenstadvold soon became involved in politics, and followed in his father's footsteps as a member of the Conservative Party. He was elected to serve in Bærum municipal council in 1975, served as deputy mayor from 1975 to 1978, and acting mayor from 1978 to 1979. He replaced Willy Greiner due to the latter's illness, and was replaced by Gunnar Gravdahl after the 1979 elections. From 1979 to 1981 he was a member of Akershus county council. In 1981, when the Willoch's First Cabinet assumed office, Stenstadvold was appointed State Secretary in the Ministry of Consumer Affairs and Administration. He retreated in 1984 to concentrate on his business career.

After a short period as a research assistant at the University of Oslo, Stenstadvold had been hired as information director of the Federation of Norwegian Industries (a predecessor of the Confederation of Norwegian Enterprise) in 1972. In 1979 he was hired as director of strategy and communication in Kreditkassen, and remained here until 1987, except for the time as State Secretary. In 1988 he was hired as director of the chemistry division in Orkla Group. He was then CEO from 1991 to 2006. From 2001 he was also responsible for Orkla Media, Orkla's branch for media ownership which was replaced by Edda Media in 2006. In the media field Stenstadvold also served as a member of the Broadcasting Council, chair of the Norwegian Broadcasting Corporation from 1986 to 1991 and TVNorge from 1991 to 1994. He notably advocated abolishing the Norwegian press support, which in Stenstadvold's opinion "hinders product development".

Stenstadvold has also been the chair of the Research Council of Norway from 1994 to 2000, board member of Storebrand from 2002 and Statkraft from 2003. At the Oslo Stock Exchange he became a board member in 2005 and chair in 2006, but he withdrew in 2007 following a technical misunderstanding. He was first admonished by the Financial Supervisory Authority of Norway for belatedly reporting a stock sale in Orkla Group, but after he withdrew it surfaced that the sale had been reported in the right time, automatically. This episode was considered to be among the "biggest mistakes of 2007" by online newspaper E24 Næringsliv. In 2008 he became chair of the Henie-Onstad Art Centre.

Political offices
Preceded by Willy Greiner	Mayor of Bærum; 1978–1979	Succeeded by Gunnar Gravdahl
Media offices
Preceded by	Chair of the Norwegian Broadcasting Corporation; 1986–1991	Succeeded by Trygve Ramberg
