= Odd Reinsfelt =

Norwegian politician (1941–2022)

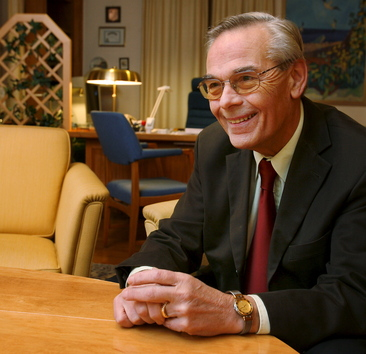

Mayor of Bærum
- In office 1 January 1992 – 15 October 2011
- Preceded by: Gunnar Gravdahl
- Succeeded by: Lisbeth Hammer Krogh

Personal details
- Born: 23 August 1941 Bærum, Reichskommissariat Norwegen (today Norway)
- Died: 16 August 2022 (aged 80)
- Party: Conservative
- Occupation: Meteorologist

Odd Reinsfelt (23 August 1941 – 16 August 2022) was a Norwegian politician for the Conservative Party and meteorologist.

Before Reinsfelt became a full-time politician he was Chief Meteorologist at NATO's Norwegian department.

Reinsfelt entered the municipal council of Bærum after the 1975 election. He became mayor of Bærum in 1992, having served as deputy mayor since 1980. He retired in 2011.

Reinsfelt died on 16 August 2022, at the age of 80, a week before turning 81.

Preceded by Gunnar Gravdahl	Mayor of Bærum; 1992–2011	Succeeded by Lisbeth Hammer Krog
