= Per Arne Watle =

Norwegian businessman

Per Arne Watle (born 1948) is a Norwegian businessperson and former politician for the Centre Party. He is best known as the CEO of Widerøe from 1997 to 2008.

== Career ==
He hails from Trondheim, and his father was involved in transport as director of Trondheim Bilruter and Trondheim Trafikkselskap. He took his education at the University of Trondheim, and with the cand.philol. degree he worked as a school teacher in Trondheim for several years. He then worked as information director at SINTEF in Trondheim from 1977 to 1983 and as a personal secretary (now known as political advisor) in the Ministry of Transport and Communications from 1983 to 1985, under Willoch's Second Cabinet. In Trondheim he had chaired the local chapter of the Centre Party for six years. While working as personal secretary he also took a degree in economics at the Norwegian School of Management. In 1985 he was hired in Scandinavian Airlines System, and in 1986 he was promoted to director of SAS Norge. He was then director of marketing in Tine Norske Meierier from 1990 to 1994 and director in Gilde from 1994 to 1997. He has been the board chairman of Norsk Rikstoto, and from 1988 to 1994 he held the same position in Nationen. In 1997 he was hired as CEO of Widerøe. Soon after his takeover, the company was sold by Fred. Olsen & Co. and bought by the SAS Group. Within the SAS Group, Widerøe eventually took over the regional route operations in Northern Norway, having been run under the name SAS Commuter. He remained in Widerøe for eleven years, and also chaired the Federation of Norwegian Aviation Industries.

In 2008 he resigned as CEO of Widerøe. He also stepped down as president of the European Regions Airline Association. Later that year he was hired as head of the European Commission's Industry Consultation Body on the Single European Sky project. He is also the chair of Hurtigruten.

He resides in Lommedalen. Hobbies include English Setter breeding and lagopus hunting.

Business positions
Preceded by Bård Mikkelsen	CEO of Widerøe; 1997–2008	Succeeded by Lars Kobberstad
