= Hans Haslum =

Norwegian farmer and elected official

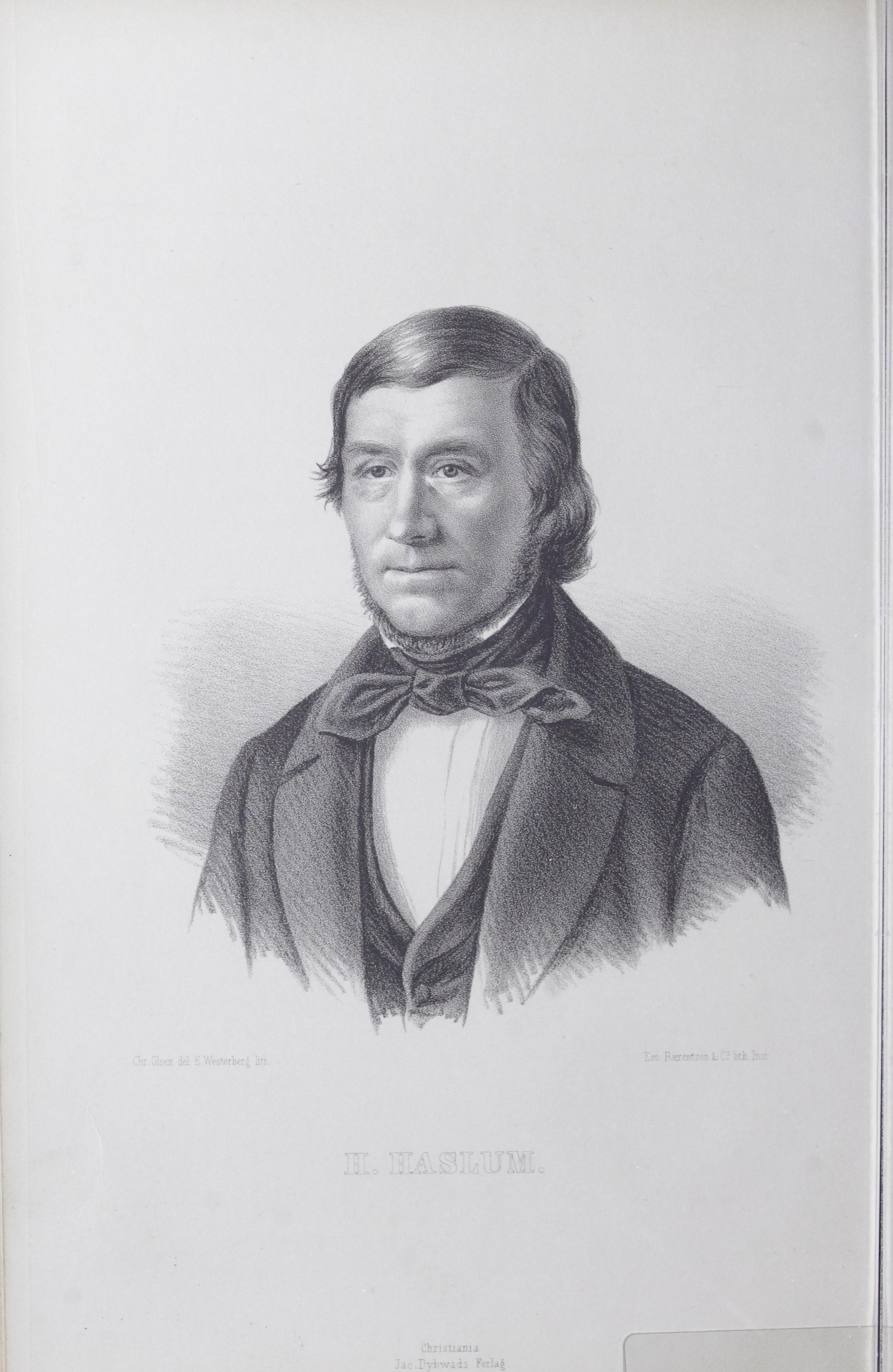
Hans Johnsen Haslum

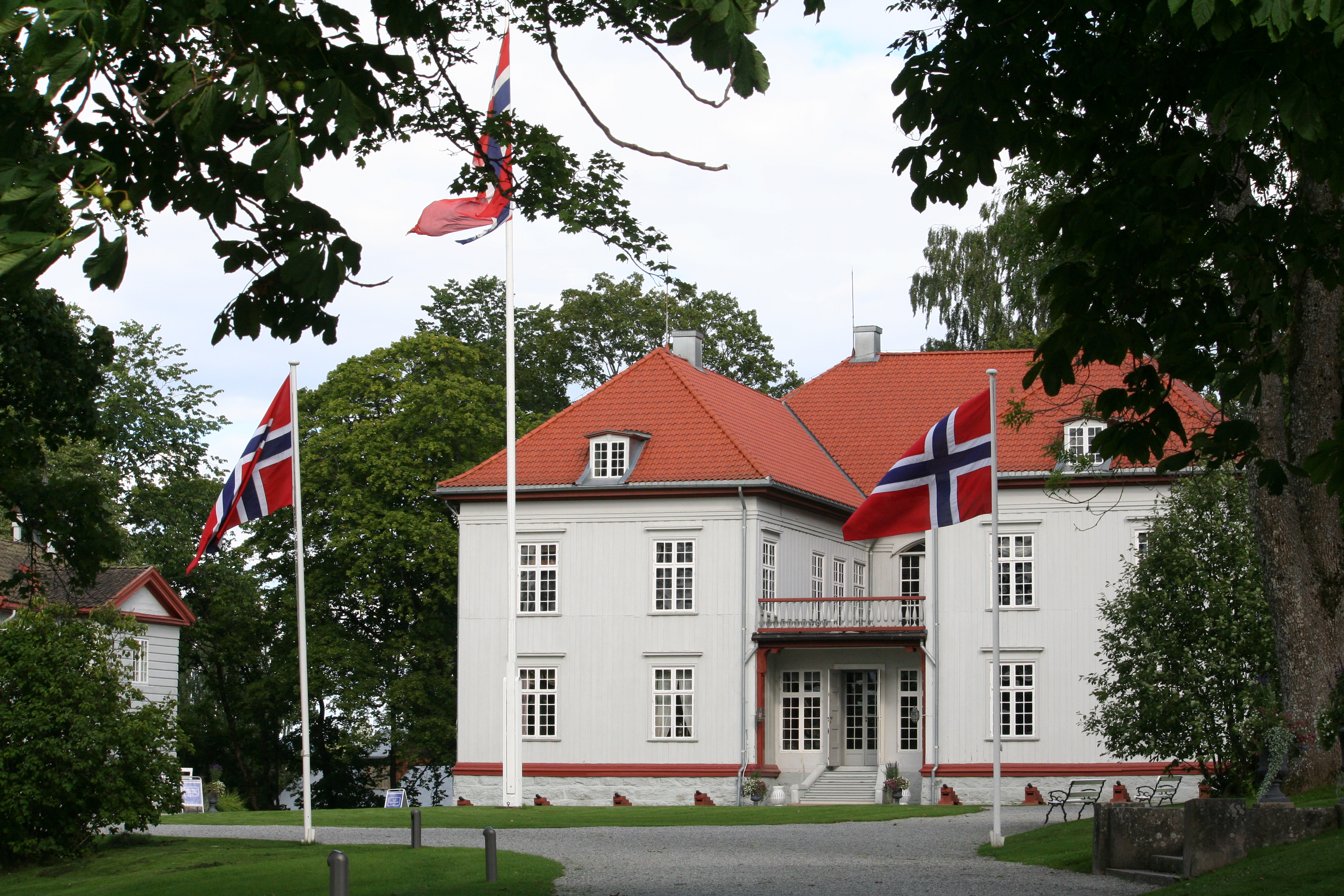
Eidsvollsbygningen at Eidsvoll

Hans Haslum (8 November 1789 – 5 July 1875) was a Norwegian farmer and elected official. He served as a representative at the Norwegian Constitutional Assembly.

Hans Johnsen Haslum was born in Haslum at Bærum in Akershus, Norway. He was raised on a family farm and was educated at home by a tutor. As a young man, he chose a military career. He became a corporal in 1805. In 1814, he was serving as a sergeant in the Artillery Corps. In 1816, Haslum was discharged from military service.

Hans Johnsen Haslum represented the Artillery Corps (Artilleri-Corpsetat) the Norwegian Constituent Assembly in 1814, together with Peter Motzfeldt. Both representatives supported the independence party (Selvstendighetspartiet). During the Swedish-Norwegian War in 1814 he participated in the Battle of Kjølberg Bridge.

In 1816, he married Anne Christine Norderaas (1791-1834) with whom he had seven children. When they married, the couple took over her family farm (Norderaas i Ås) in Follo. He was also acting sheriff of the district and from 1838-1841 he was the first mayor of Ås. In 1857, Haslum became the first director of the Eidsvoll Building (Eidsvollsbygningen) at Eidsvoll.

== Related Reading ==
- Holme Jørn (2014) De kom fra alle kanter - Eidsvollsmennene og deres hus (Oslo: Cappelen Damm) ISBN 978-82-02-44564-5
