= Johs Haugerud =

Norwegian politician

Johs. (Johannes) Haugerud (26 October 1896 in Grünerløkka – 21 February 1971) was a Norwegian politician for the Conservative Party.

He served as mayor of Bærum from 1959 to 1967. Outside politics he worked as an engineer.

Preceded by Henry Lehre	Mayor of Bærum; 1959–1967	Succeeded by Willy Greiner
