= Gunnar Gravdahl =

Norwegian politician

Gunnar Gravdahl (17 August 1927 – 18 April 2015) was a Norwegian politician for the Conservative Party.

He served as mayor of Bærum from 1979 to 1992. Outside politics he was a psychologist.

Political offices
Preceded by Halvor Stenstadvold	Mayor of Bærum; 1979–1992	Succeeded by Odd Reinsfelt
