= Håkon Stenstadvold =

Norwegian painter, illustrator, journalist, art critic and politician

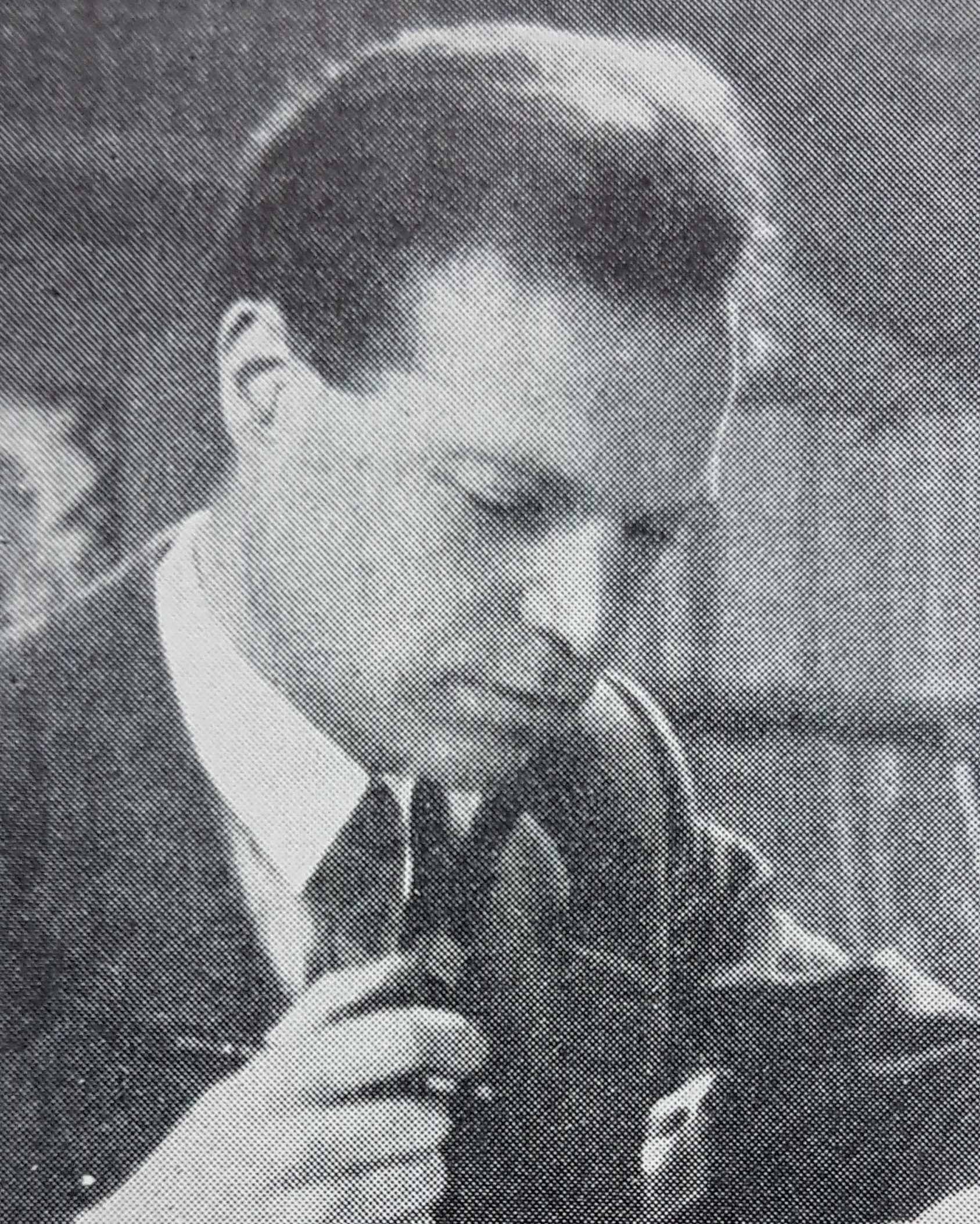
- Håkon Stenstadvold.
- Born: 2 August 1912; Sarpsborg, Norway
- Died: 7 October 1977 (aged 65); Bærum, Norway
- Occupations: Painter; Illustrator; Journalist; Art critic Politician
- Spouse: Ingeborg Anvik (1943–1977; his death)
- Children: Halvor Stenstadvold
- Family: Christen Stenstadvold (father); Alfhild Pedersen (mother); Karl Stenstadvold (brother)

Håkon Stenstadvold (2 August 1912 – 7 October 1977) was a Norwegian painter, illustrator, journalist, art critic and politician for the Conservative Party.

== Personal life ==
He was born in Sarpsborg as a son of Christen Stenstadvold (1873–1952) and his wife Alfhild Pedersen (1887–1960). He was a brother of Karl Stenstadvold, and lived in Sandvika. He married Ingeborg Anvik in January 1943, and is the father of businessperson and politician Halvor Stenstadvold.

== Education and career ==
He studied at the Norwegian National Academy of Fine Arts from 1931 to 1934 and at Academie Scandinave, Paris from 1934 to 1935. He later conducted several study trips in Italy and France in 1938 (studying under Marcel Gromaire and Pierre Dubreuil), 1948, 1951 and 1955 to 1956. Stenstadvold was represented at the National Autumn Exhibition of 1934, and held his first own exhibit in 1938. He painted in the figurative style. The pinnacle work of his career was the illustrations of the book trilogy Kristin Lavransdatter. He is also represented with works in the National Museum of Stockholm.

Stenstadvold issued several books, and was a journalist in Bo-Nytt from 1942 to 1969 and an art critic in Aftenposten from 1946 to 1953. He was also member of Bærum municipal council from 1956 to 1959. From 1964 to 1977 he was the rector of the Norwegian National Academy of Craft and Art Industry.

Stenstadvold was decorated as a Knight, First Class of the Royal Norwegian Order of St. Olav in 1969. He died on 7 October 1977 in Bærum. A square in Sandvika, Håkon Stenstadvolds plass, has been named for him.
