= Eikeli =

- Village
- Interactive map of Eikeli
- Coordinates: 59°56′13″N 10°36′11″E
- Time zone: UTC+01:00 (CET)

Eikeli is a district in the municipality of Bærum, Norway. Its population (2007) is 6,940.

It is served by the rail station Østerås on the Røa Line.
