= Alice Mürer Siem =

Norwegian ballet dancer and choreographer

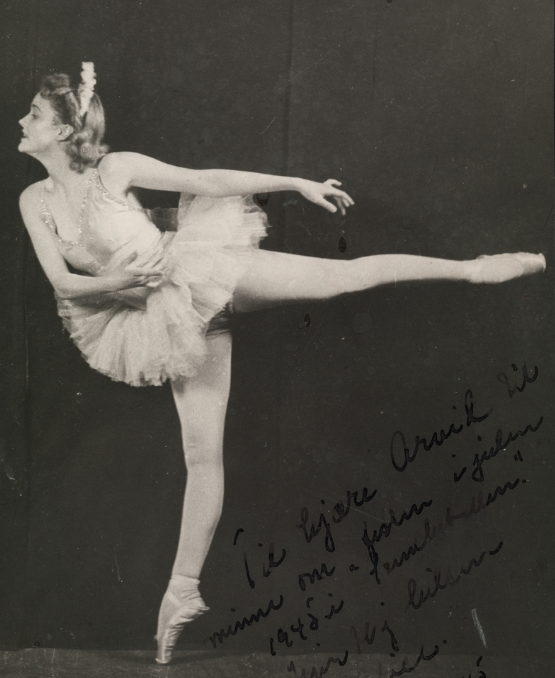
Alice Mürer (1945)

Alice Mürer Siem (1925–2002) was a Norwegian ballet dancer and choreographer. Together with her twin sister Henny Mürer, in Norway she was a pioneer in her field, dancing in revues, operettas and classical ballets.

== Biography ==
Born in Bærum on 22 February 1925, Alice Mürer was the daughter of Johan Christopher Mürer (1891–1974) and Dagmar Jenny Bie-Peterson (1896–1977). Together with her sister, she studied at Rita Tori's ballet school from 1938 to 1946. In 1942, she made her début at Oslo's Carl Johan Theatre and went on to perform at the Edderkoppen Theatre, the Chat Noir and the Oslo Nye Teater. She and her sister were the first foreigners to study at the Royal Ballet School in London when they arrived in 1949 for the next three years. Thereafter, Mürer danced with the Ballets Russes from Monte Carlo, also performing with them in New York City and frequently appearing in broadcasts.

She later collaborated with Ivo Cramér, developing the choreography for Summer in Tyrol, My Fair Lady and The Boy Friend at the Oslo Nye Teater.

In 1960, she married the pianist and conductor Kåre Siem. Alice Mürer Siem died in Oslo on 10 October 2002 and is buried in Ullern Cemetery.
