= Hauger BK =

Bandy club in Bærum, Norway

Logo.

Hauger Bandyklubb is a bandy club from Bærum, Norway.

It was founded on 3 September 1984, and plays at Hauger kunstisbane and Bærum ishall. At the first venue, two games of the 1993 Bandy World Championship were held. The world's largest bandy tournament, Kosa Open, sponsored by Kosa, is also staged here. Hauger currently plays in the Norwegian First Division, the second tier of Norwegian bandy.
