= Willy Greiner =

Norwegian politician

Willy Greiner (14 June 1919 – 25 February 2000) was a Norwegian politician for the Conservative Party.

He was mayor of Bærum from 1968 to 1978.

Outside of politics, he was a chief of department at Norsk Hydro.

Greiner held various positions of trust in Oslo Unge Høyre and Oslo Høyre from 1938 to 1950. Beyond this, he was a board member of the Oslo Conservative Club from 1954 to 1959, a member of the Bærum municipal council from 1960, a member of the Bærum executive committee from 1964, mayor from 1968 to 1978, a member of the Akershus County Council from 1963, and a member of the Akershus County Executive Committee from 1968 to 1971. Greiner resigned as mayor in 1978 for health reasons.

Preceded by Johs Haugerud	Mayor of Bærum; 1968–1978	Succeeded by Halvor Stenstadvold
