= Engervannet =

Lake in Bærum, Norway

- Location within Akershus
- Location: Bærum (Akershus)
- Coordinates: 59°53′49″N 10°32′4″E
- Basin countries: Norway
- Surface area: 18 ha (44 acres)
- Shore length^{1}: 2.61 km (1.62 mi)
- Surface elevation: 4 m (13 ft)
- Settlements: Sandvika (adjacent)
- References: NVE
- ^{1} Shore length is not a well-defined measure.

Engervannet is a lake between Blommenholm and Sandvika in the municipality of Bærum in Akershus county, Norway.

== See also ==
- List of lakes in Norway
