= Løkeberg =

- Village
- Location in Akershus
- Coordinates: 59°54′25″N 10°33′14″E
- Country: Norway
- Region: Østlandet
- County: Akershus
- Municipality: Bærum
- Time zone: UTC+01:00 (CET)
  - Summer (DST): UTC+02:00 (CEST)

Løkeberg is a district in the municipality of Bærum, Norway. Its population (2007) is 4,568.
