= Dønski =

- Village
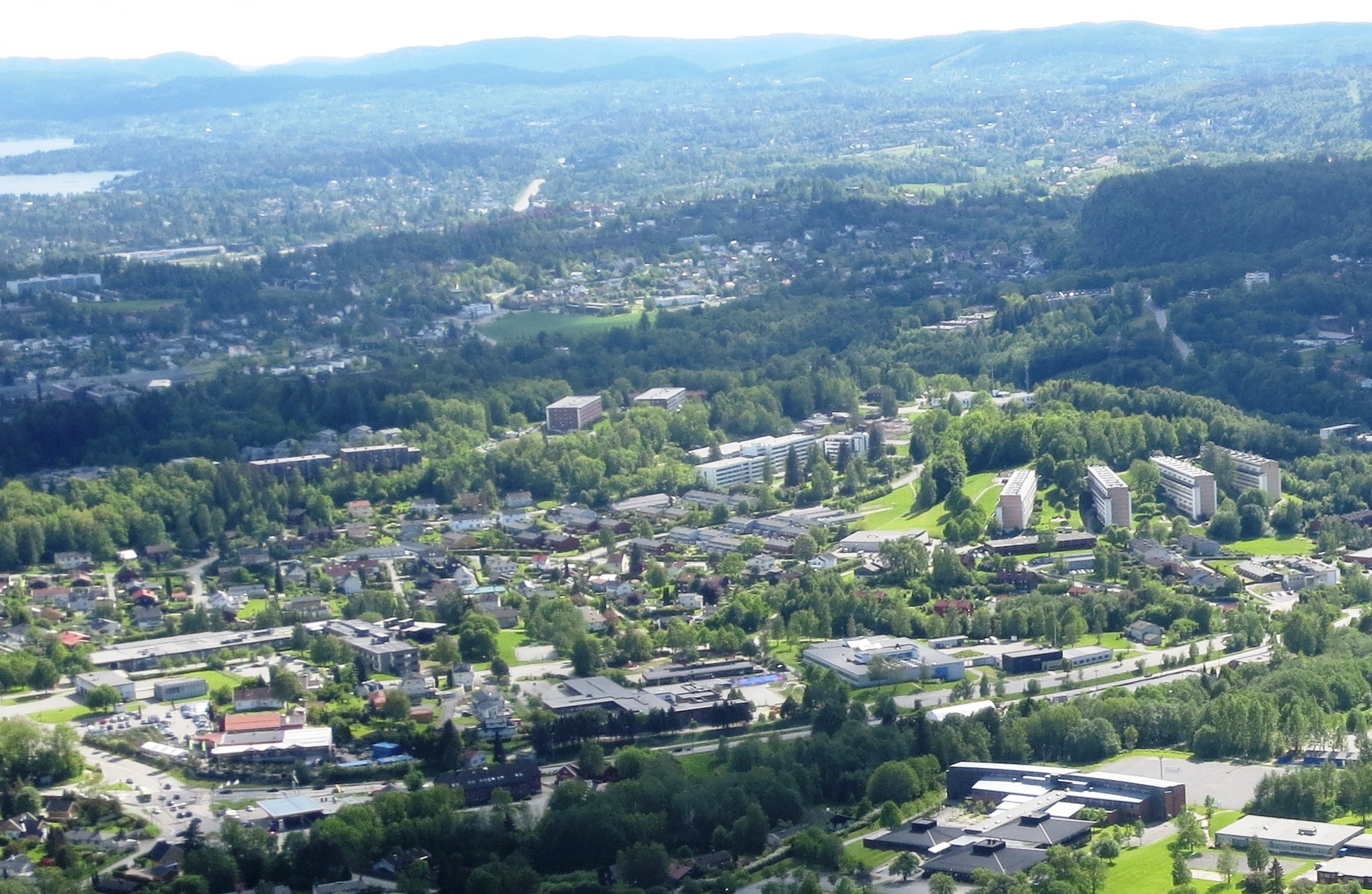
- Aerial view of the Dønski ward / quarter of western Bærum municipality, Norway
- Interactive map of Dønski
- Coordinates: 59°54′05″N 10°30′07″E
- Country: Norway
- County: Akershus
- Municipality: Bærum

Dønski is a village in Bærum, Akershus, Norway.
