= Ivo Cramér =

Swedish dancer, choreographer, ballet director and director

Martin Ivo Fredrik Carl Cramér (born 5 March 1921 in Gothenburg; died 30 April 2009 in Stockholm, Sweden) was a Swedish dancer, choreographer, ballet director and director. He was the son of Carl-Rudolf Cramér and the nephew of Harald Cramér and married to Tyyne Talvo Cramér.

== Biography ==
Cramér often worked in a folklorically inspired style with a burlesque vein and mimic elements. His dance dramas have often had historical and religious motifs. The key work The Lost Son is, for example, inspired by valley paintings from the 18th century that depict the biblical story of the lost son.

He was a member of Svenska dansteatern, which in 1945 staged the ballet Flickan som trampade på brödet. The performance was brought to Norway the same autumn, and as a choreographer in Norway he had eventually led over seventy productions, including Ridder Blåskjeggs mareritt from 1960. Among other things, he was head of choreography at Chat Noir in Oslo from 1953 to 1954. From 1967 he was mostly in Sweden, where he conducted the Cramér Ballet which lasted until 1986. It was for a time led by his wife Tyyne Talvo who had also been on Norwegian stages as the New Norwegian Ballet. From 1975 he was head of the Royal Swedish Opera ballet department until 1980.

Ivo choreographed the robber dances in the 1981 movie "Ronja rövardotter".

Ivo received Danseinformasjonens ærespris honorary award in 1999.

He was the son of Carl Rudolf Cramér (1887–1966) and Sonja Dahlerus (1888–1981). Ivo was the nephew of the statistician Harald Cramér (1893–1985) and was married to the Finnish-born choreographer and actor Tyyne Talvo (1919–1983). They established the Tyyne and Ivo Cramér Foundation.
