= Henny Mürer =

Norwegian choreographer and dancer

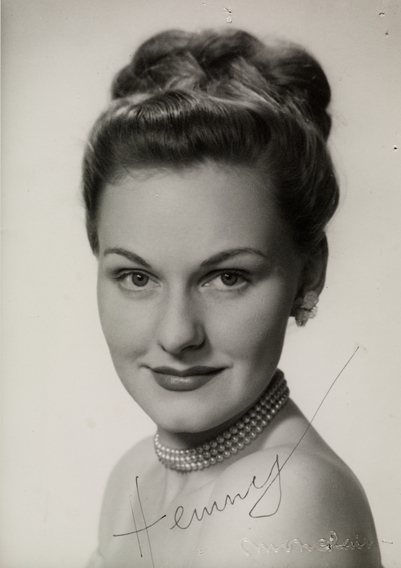
Henny Mürer, c. 1938

Henny Mürer (22 February 1925 – 14 January 1997) was a Norwegian choreographer and dancer. She was also a journalist and critic for the broadcast and newspaper media.

Her twin sister was Alice Mürer Siem (1925–2002) who was also a choreographer and dancer. Together with her sister, she studied at Rita Tori's Ballet School (1938–1946). She debuted at the Chat Noir (1946) and went to teach at the Royal Ballet School (1946–49). She was a soloist in the newly established Norwegian National Opera and Ballet (1958–1965). She served as rector for the National Ballet School from 1979 to 1986.

She was awarded the Music Critics' Prize (Kritikerprisen) in 1962 and the Order of St. Olav in 1988.
