= Bærum =

Bærum Municipality Bærum kommune
- Municipality
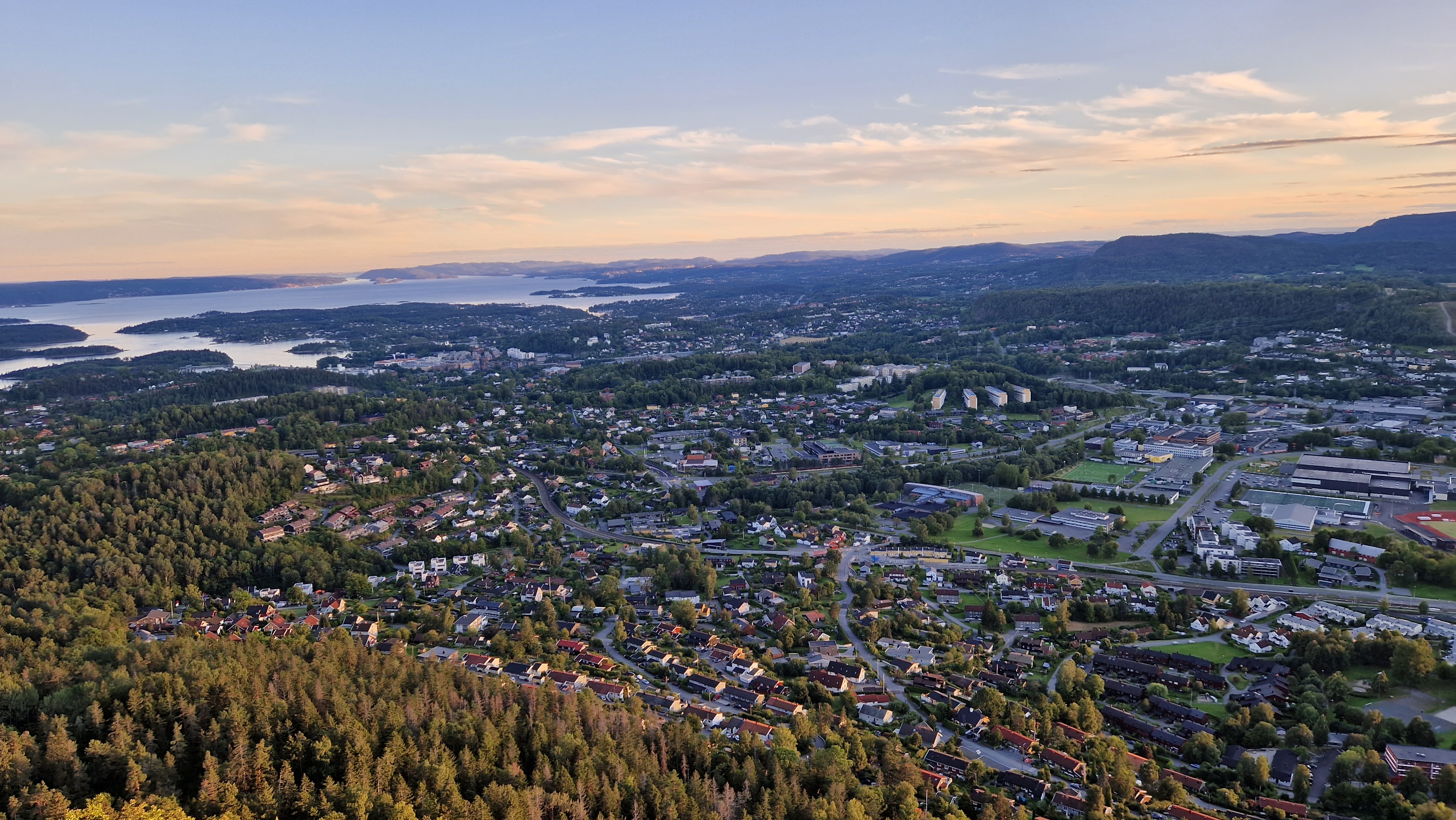

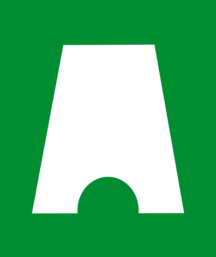
- Flag Coat of arms

- Akershus within Norway

- Bærum within Akershus
- Coordinates: 59°56′18″N 10°30′24″E
- Country: Norway
- County: Akershus
- Administrative centre: Sandvika

Government
  - Mayor (2011): Lisbeth Hammer Krog (H)

Area
  - Total: 192 km^{2} (74 sq mi)
  - Land: 189 km^{2} (73 sq mi)
  - Rank: #334 in Norway

Population (31 December 2022)
  - Total: 129,874 ▲
  - Rank: #5th in Norway
  - Density: 547/km^{2} (1,420/sq mi)
  - Change (10 years): ▲ +9.8%
- Demonym: Bæring

Official language
  - Norwegian form: Bokmål
- Time zone: UTC+01:00 (CET)
  - Summer (DST): UTC+02:00 (CEST)
- ISO 3166 code: NO-3201
- Website: Official website

Bærum (Norwegian: [ˈbæ̂ːrʉm]) is a municipality in the Greater Oslo Region in Akershus County, Norway. It forms an affluent suburb of Oslo on the west coast of the city. Bærum is Norway's fifth largest municipality with a population of 128,760 (2021). The administrative centre of the municipality is the town of Sandvika. Bærum was established as a municipality on 1 January 1838.

Bærum has the highest income per capita in Norway and the highest proportion of university-educated individuals. Bærum, particularly its eastern neighbourhoods bordering West End Oslo, is one of Norway's priciest and most fashionable residential areas. The municipality has been voted the best Norwegian place to live in considering governance and public services to citizens.

== Name ==
The name (Old Norse: Bergheimr) is composed of berg, which means "mountain", and heimr, which means "homestead" or "farm". It probably originally belonged to a farm located at the base of the prominent mountain of Kolsås. In Old Norse times, the municipality was often called Bergheimsherað, meaning "the herað (parish/district) of Bergheimr".

== Coat-of-arms ==
The coat-of-arms was granted on 9 January 1976. They show an old silver-colored lime kiln on a green background. That was an important aspect of the local economy from the Middle Ages until around 1800. There are still some original ovens visible in the municipality.

== History ==
The area known today as Bærum was a fertile agricultural area as far back as the Bronze Age, and several archeological finds stem from the Iron Age. The first mention of the name is from the saga of Sverre of Norway, from about 1200. There are ruins of stone churches from the 12th century at Haslum and Tanum.

The pilgrim road to Trondheim, established after 1030, went through Bærum, and there is evidence that lime kilns were in use in the area in 850. There were shipping ports for the quicklime at Slependen and Sandvika. The lime kiln is the main motif for the municipality's coat of arms.

In the 17th century, iron ore was discovered in Bærum and the ironworks at Bærums Verk were founded. Industries such as paper mills, nail factories, sawmills, glassworks, and brickworks were established along the rivers Lysakerelven and Sandvikselva in the following centuries. There were orchards and other agricultural concerns throughout the area, remnants of which still exist today.

A number of artists established themselves in Bærum, particularly around the art school run by Johan Fredrik Eckersberg. Among the artists who did much of their work in Bærum are Frits Thaulow, Christian Skredsvig, Harriet Backer, Kitty Lange Kielland, Otto Sinding, Eilif Pettersen, Gerhardt Munthe, and Erik Werenskiold.

Starting in the mid-20th century, Bærum's agricultural base gradually gave way to residential construction. Still, only a third of the area, 64 square kilometres (24.7 mi^{2}), is built up for residential use; over half is productive forestry; and nearly 17 square kilometres (6.6 mi^{2}) is still agricultural.

In 2010, the Eurovision Song Contest was hosted in Bærum.

On 10 August 2019, a gunman opened fire on congregants at the Al-Noor Islamic Centre, after shooting and killing his ethnically Chinese adopted stepsister at their home.

== Geography ==
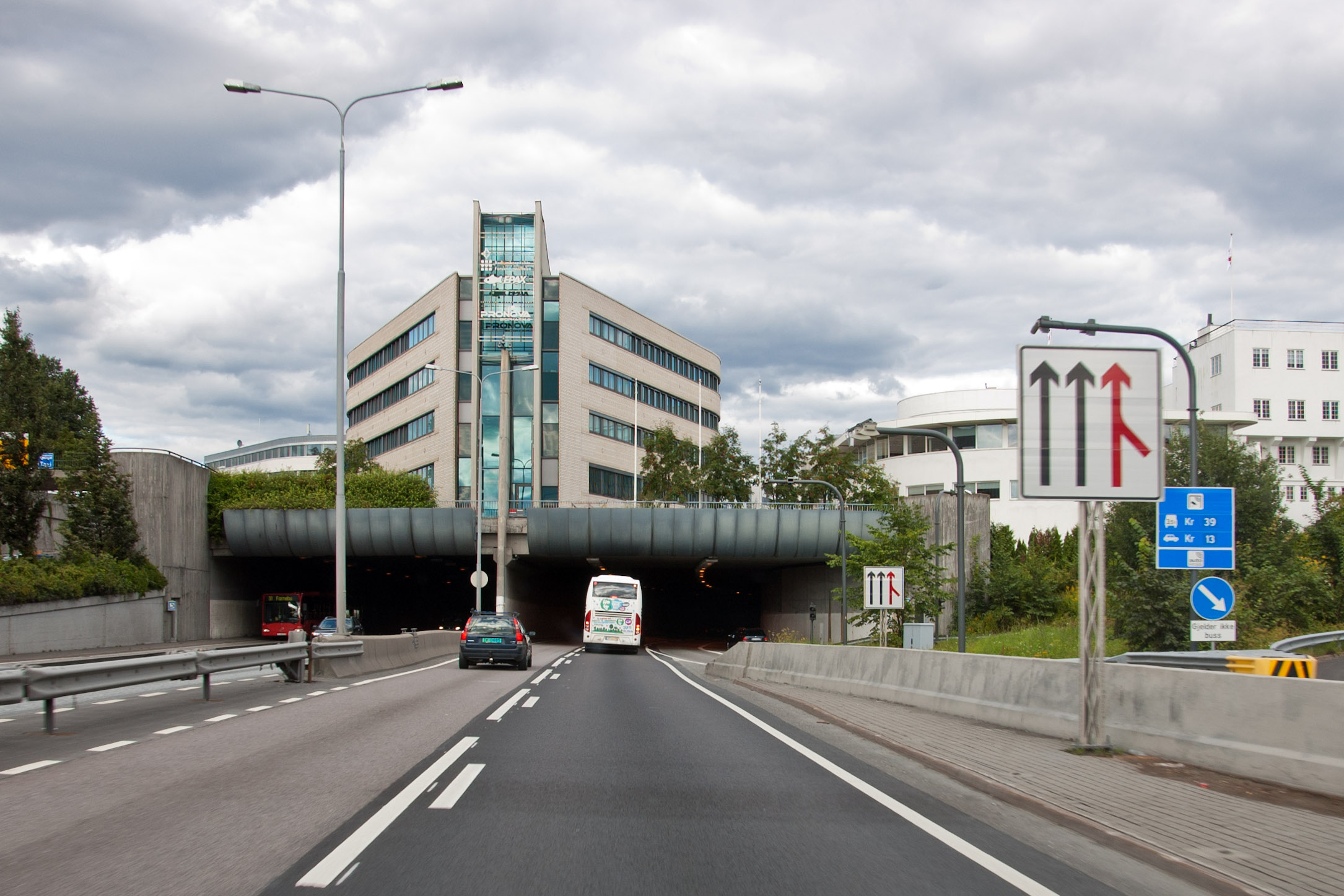
Lysakerlokket

The physical geography of Bærum is dominated by a craggy coastline along the Oslofjord and inland, hilly areas rising to the north and east, where there are large forested areas. The mountain of Kolsås forms a natural center, but the municipality also includes the secluded valley of Lommedalen. Four major rivers flow through the municipality: Lysakerelven, Sandvikselva, Lomma, and Øverlandselva, and there are numerous lakes, both in residential and forested areas. The official municipality flower is Anemone ranunculoides.

The geology of Bærum is part of the Oslo Graben and includes Rhomb porphyry at Kolsås.

Since nearly two-thirds of Bærum's area consists of forests, there are rich opportunities for outdoor activities, such as skiing, hiking, and fishing. The forests are considered part of Marka, the forested areas in and around Greater Oslo. Areas within the municipality of Bærum include Bærumsmarka, Vestmarka, and Krokskogen.

The highest point in Bærum is Vidvangshøgda at 60.0242329°N 10.4838324°E with an altitude of 552 metres (1,811 ft). The largest lake is Stovivatnet with an area of 0.420 square kilometres (0.162 sq mi) at 59.9078776°N 10.4508305°E

== Economy ==
Bærum's industrial base has since the 1950s given way to service industries, including retailing, engineering, public services, etc. It derives much of its tax base by being a bedroom community to Oslo. It is one of the most affluent areas in Norway.

Two of Norway's busiest highways (E18 and E16) and one railroad traverse the municipality. There has been considerable development of office parks along E18, especially around Lysaker in the last 20–30 years, reducing some of the pressure on downtown areas of Oslo. Scandinavian Airlines System Norway has its offices in Fornebu, Bærum. The airline Widerøe has some administrative offices in Lysaker, Bærum. Norwegian Air Shuttle has its head office in Fornebu.

Partnair, a charter airline, was headquartered at Fornebu Airport. When the airline Busy Bee of Norway existed, its head office was on the grounds of Fornebu Airport. Braathens and SAS Braathens had their head office facilities in a building on the grounds of Fornebu Airport. In 2010, Norwegian Air Shuttle bought the former Braathens head office.

== Demographics ==
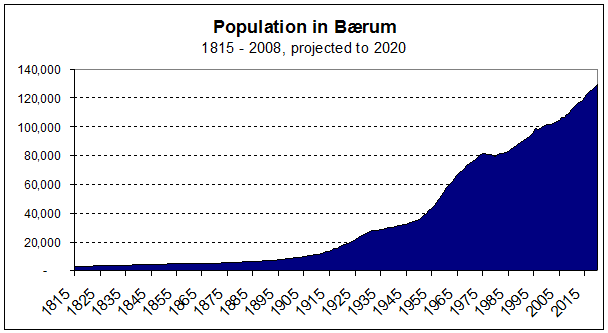
Source: Asker og Bærum-leksikon, Bærum kommune

Historical population
Year	Pop.	±%
1951	35,838	—
1961	57,573	+60.6%
1971	76,580	+33.0%
1981	80,385	+5.0%
1991	90,579	+12.7%
2001	101,340	+11.9%
2011	112,789	+11.3%
2021	128,233	+13.7%
Source: Statistics Norway

Bærum (2009) is the fifth most densely populated municipality in Norway. Along the E18 highway, the residential area is continuous with Oslo and continues with some interruption through to the neighboring municipality of Asker.

Bærum is also the most affluent of Norwegian municipalities, with average per capita income (2002 figures) of NOK 370,800; compared with the national average of NOK 262,800. It also has the highest level of education nationwide.

Administratively, Bærum is divided into 22 sections. The population for each section on 1 January 2005 was:

Bærums Verk	7,565
East Bærumsmarka	1,936
Dønski-Rud	3,186
Grav	5,624
Haslum	5,286
Hosle north	2,973
Hosle south	4,677
Høvik	4,172

Jar	5,793
Jong	2,762
Kirkerud-Sollihøgda	3,449
Kolsås	5,185
Løkeberg-Blommenholm	6,863
Lommedalen	3,064
Lysaker:	3,439
Østerås-Eiksmarka	3,927

Rykkinn	8,971
Sandvika-Valler	4,742
Slependen-Tanum	7,005
Snarøya	2,807
Stabekk:	6,261
Voll	4,896
N/A	107

Number of minorities (1st and 2nd generation) in Bærum by country of origin in 2020
Ancestry	Number
Poland	4,346
Sweden	1,743
Iran	1,343
Philippines	1,189
Russia	1,000
Pakistan	982
India	897
Somalia	859
Denmark	841
Iraq	832
United Kingdom	806
Afghanistan	746
Germany	738
China	716
Eritrea	653
Lithuania	607
United States	475
Romania	458
Syria	445
Bosnia-Herzegovina	424

== Community ==
According to a local survey conducted by Dagbladet, Bærum is the best place to live in Norway in terms of governance and services to residents. In addition is it also one of the best places for young people to grow up. Bærum score high on national surveys when it comes to local economical governance, education and possibilities for young people, health coverage, school rankings, and work rights and possibilities

=== Churches in Bærum ===
- Bryn kirke
- Grinilund kirke
- Haslum kirke
- Haslumseter kapell
- Helgerud kirke
- Høvik kirke
- Jar kirke
- Kilentunet kapell
- Lommedalen Kirke
- Østerås kirke
- Snarøya kirke
- Tanum kirke
- Verk Kapell

=== Schools in Bærum ===
There are a number of schools in Bærum, both public and private. There are a total of 43 public elementary schools ( primary and / or secondary ) and some private, including Bærum Montessori School. According to national surveys, Jar public elementary school ranks the highest when it comes to math, while Lommedalen public elementary school ranks the highest in reading, both are located in Bærum.

There are eight public high schools in Bærum; Dønski, Eikeli, Nadderud, Rosenvilde, Rud, Sandvika, Stabekk and Valler. In addition, the Norwegian College of Elite Sport and Steiner School. The Folk University also has a branch in Sandvika. Valler High School has been ranked within the top 5 high schools in Norway for several years, while Nadderud High School ranks within the top 20. In the later years both schools have met competition from the newly established Sandvika High School. Sandvika High School has had the highest number of applications in the county for the past six years, and is now ranked within top 10 in the country. In 2013 the school also won for Best Entrepreneurship School in Norway.

== Sports ==
Stabæk IF plays in Eliteserien, the highest division for men's football in Norway. Bærum SK plays in the 2. divisjon, the third highest division of the Norwegian football league system.

Stabæk IF's women's football team, Stabæk Fotball Kvinner, plays in Toppserien, the Norwegian top division.

Høvik IF and Stabæk IF plays in the highest bandy division and Hauger BK in the second highest.

The handball club Haslum Topphåndballforening plays in the top division on both the men's and women's side.

== Notable residents ==
=== Public Service & Business ===
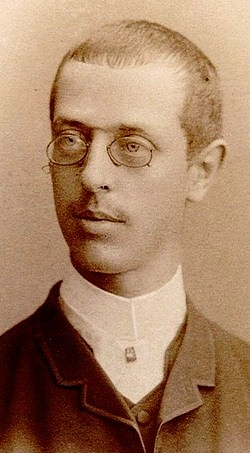
Christian Fredrik Michelet, ca.1885

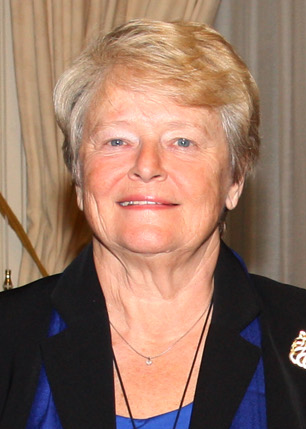
Gro Harlem Brundtland, 2011

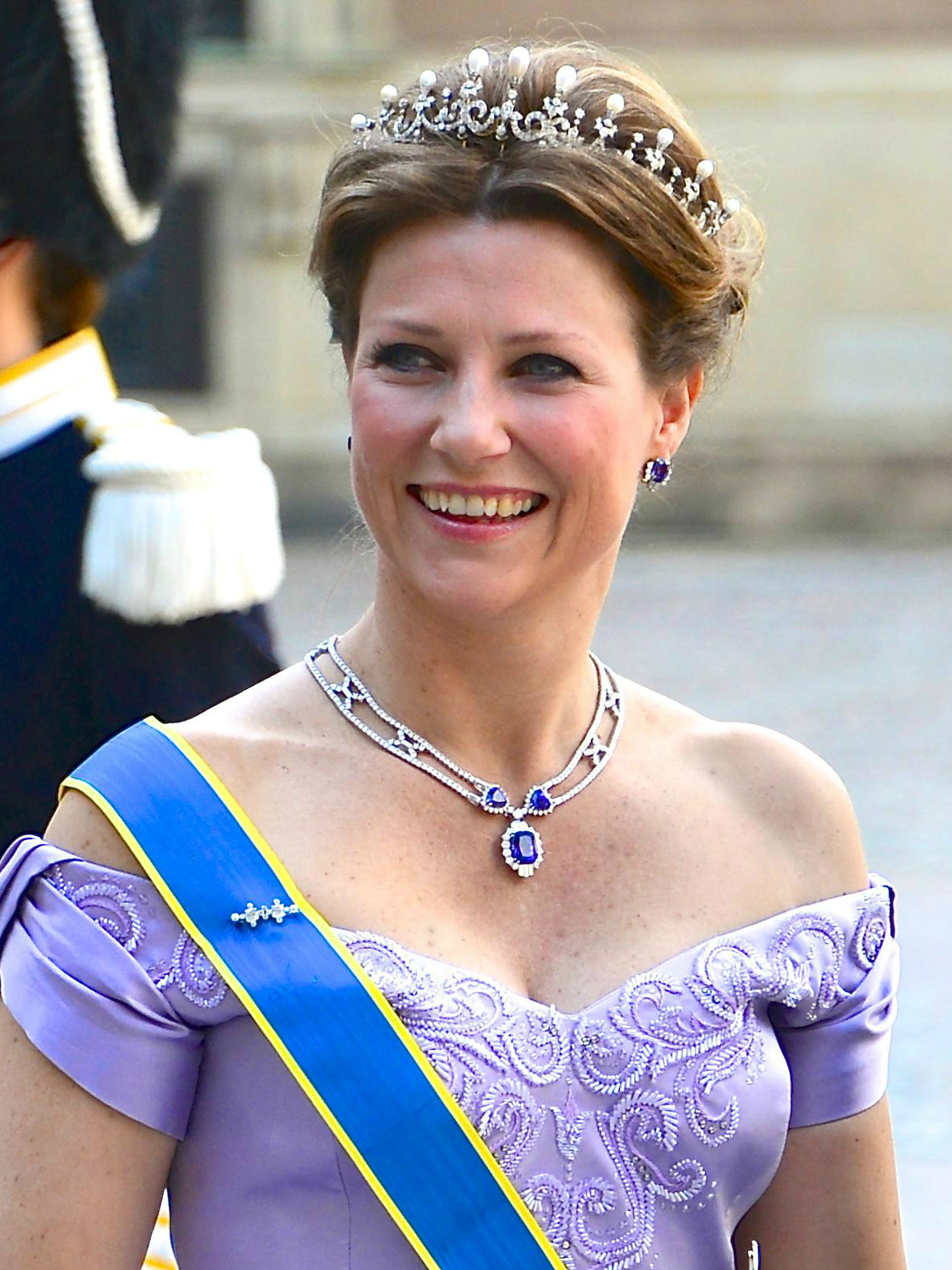
Princess Märtha Louise of Norway, 2013

- Hans Haslum (1789 in Haslum – 1875) farmer, rep. at Norwegian Constitutional Assembly
- Otto Sverdrup (1854 – 1930 in Sandvika) a Norwegian sailor and Arctic explorer
- Fridtjof Nansen (1861–1930), zoologist, explorer, scientist, diplomat, 1922 Nobel Peace Prize laureate and League of Nations High Commissioner
- Christian Fredrik Michelet (1863–1927) a lawyer and Mayor of Bærum 1899 to 1910 and acting Prime Minister of Norway in 1923
- Halvdan Koht (1873–1965) a historian and Bærum councillor 1910's, 20's & 30's
- Alf Staver (1874 in Bærum – 1953) a skier, sports official, educator and politician
- Torger Baardseth (1875 in Bærum – 1947) bookseller and publisher
- Viktor Esbensen (1881–1942), Whaler and explorer, brought up in Bærum
- Johs Haugerud (1896–1971) engineer, politician and Mayor of Bærum from 1959 to 1967
- Ingrid Bjerkås (1901–1980) first female minister in the Church of Norway, lived in Bærum
- Odd Nansen (1901 in Bærum – 1973) architect, author and humanitarian; co-founded UNICEF
- Leif Tronstad DSO, OBE (1903 in Bærum – 1945) scientist and intelligence officer in WWII
- Else Werring (1905–1989) a Norwegian royal hostess, lived at Munkebakken estate in Lysaker
- Håkon Stenstadvold (1912–1977) a painter, journalist and politician; lived in Sandvika
- Sgt Per Bergsland (1918 in Bærum – 1992) fighter pilot and POW, escaped from Stalag Luft III
- Willy Greiner (1919–2000) Mayor of Bærum from 1968 to 1978 & Norsk Hydro chief
- Jo Benkow (1924–2013), politician and author, brought up in Bærum
- Arvid Anseth (1925 in Bærum – 2006), ophthalmologist
- Gunnar Gravdahl (1927–2015) a psychologist and Mayor of Bærum 1979 to 1992
- Elisabeth Sveri (1927–2018) first female senior official in the military; lived in Eiksmarka
- Torild Skard (born 1936) politician, former CEO of UNICEF, brought up Lysaker and Stabekk
- Gro Harlem Brundtland (born 1939 in Bærum), politician, former Prime Minister of Norway
- Rasmus Hansson (born 1954 in Bærum) biologist and politician; lives in Bærumsmarka
- Lars Kobberstad (born 1962 in Bærum) a businessperson, the CEO of Widerøe
- Christian Tybring-Gjedde (born 1963) a controversial politician, raised in Sandvika
- Jan Tore Sanner (born 1965 in Bærum), politician and Minister of Finance
- Princess Märtha Louise of Norway (born 1971), fourth in line of succession to the Norwegian throne, lived in Lommedalen
- Anita Schjøll Brede (born 1985 in Bærum), technology entrepreneur

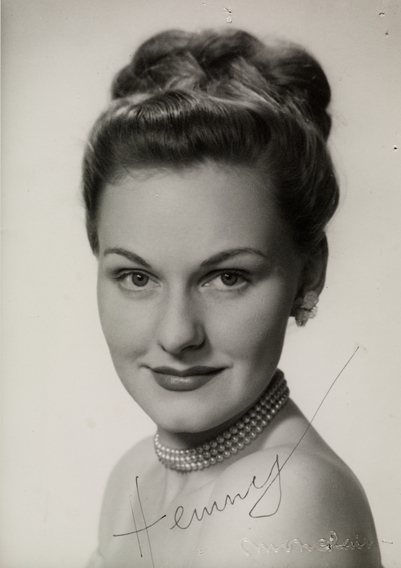
Henny Mürer, ca.1945

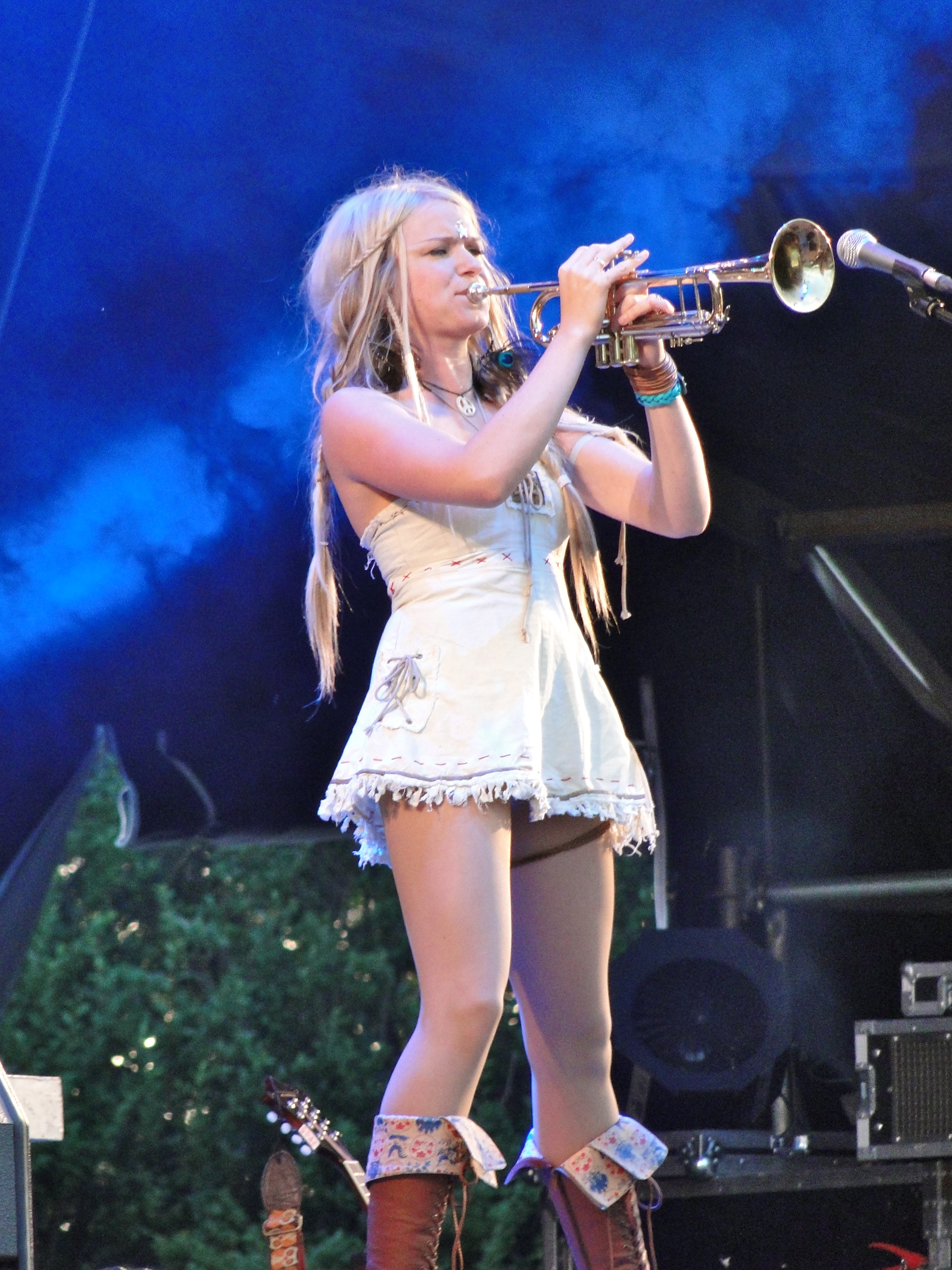
Solveig Heilo, 2011

=== The Arts ===
- Claude Monet (1840–1926), painter, stayed in Sandvika in 1895 where he painted Sandvika featuring the Løkke bridge, with Kolsås in the background
- Kitty Lange Kielland (1845–1932) a landscape painter, a street in Bærum is named after her.
- Harriet Backer (1845–1932), painter of interior scenes; lived in Sandvika from 1888
- Eilif Peterssen (1852–1928 in Lysaker) painter of landscapes and portraits
- Elise Brandes (1873 in Lysaker – 1918) a Danish sculptor who specialised in busts
- Jens Peter Book-Jenssen (1910 in Bærum – 1999) a singer, songwriter and revue artist
- Ivo Caprino (1920–2001), Film director of puppet films; lived at Snarøya
- Gunnar Brunvoll (1924 in Bærum – 1999) opera administrator at Den Norske Opera
- twins (from Bærum) Henny Mürer (1925–1997) & Alice Mürer Siem (1925–2002) ballet dancers
- Kristian Bergheim (1926 in Bærum – 2010) a noted saxophonist, lived in Stabekk
- Toralv Maurstad (1926 in Bærum – 2022) a prominent stage, screen, and TV actor
- Leif Husebye (1926–2009) sports journalist and sailor, lived in Sandvika
- Jan Voigt (1928 in Bærum – 1997) actor, dancer and museum director
- Sølvi Wang (1929 in Høvik – 2011) a Norwegian singer, actress and comedian
- Alf Nordvang (1931 in Bærum – 2007) a Norwegian actor and theatre director
- Finn Alnæs (1932 in Bærum – 1991) writer of the novel Koloss in 1963
- Kjell Hallbing (1934 in Bærum – 2004) writer of Western books
- Anne-Grethe Leine Bientie (born 1954 in Bærum) writer and psalmist, uses South Sami
- Vebjørn Sand (born 1966 in Bærum) painter, artist and does public arts projects
- Harald Eia (born 1966 in Bærum) comedian, sociologist and documentarian
- Ane Dahl Torp (born 1975 in Bærum) a Norwegian actress
- Solveig Heilo (born 1981 in Bærum) composer, artist, musician, member of Katzenjammer
- Martin Danielle (born 1988 in Snarøya) stage name CLMD, a DJ, songwriter and artist
- Mona Berntsen (born 1990 in Jar) a Norwegian-Moroccan dancer
- Andreas Haukeland (born 1993 in Bærum) stage name TIX, a Norwegian musician, producer and contestant at the 2021 Eurovision Song Contest

=== Sport ===
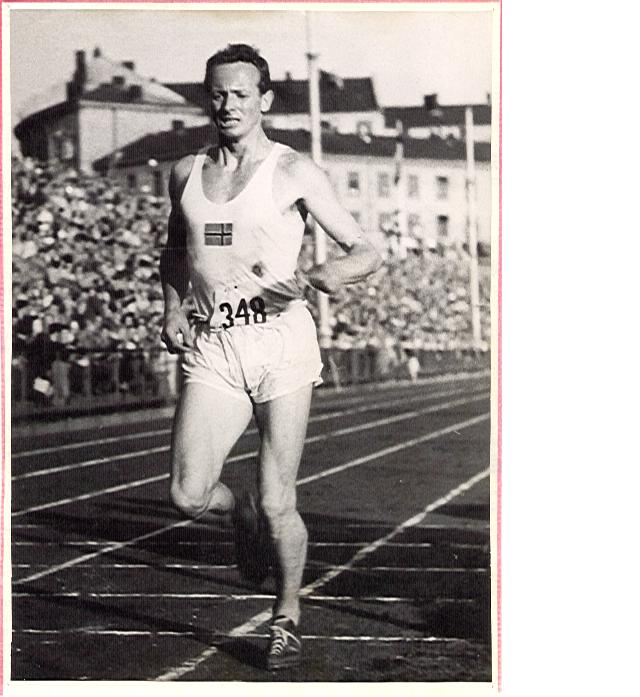
Godtfred Holmvang, 1946

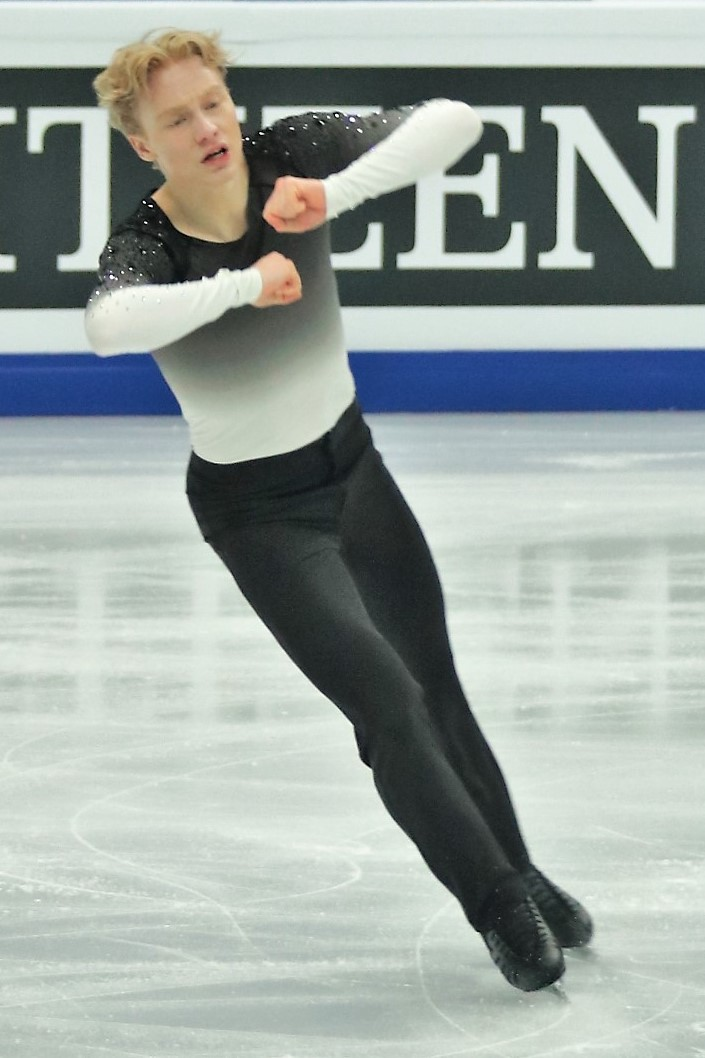
Sondre Oddvoll Bøe, 2018

- Narve Bonna (1901 in Bærum – 1976) ski jumper, won the first ski jumping silver medal at the 1924 Winter Olympics
- Godtfred Holmvang (1917 in Bærum – 2006) a decathlete and skier, later worked for the UN
- Knut Østby (1922–2010) Olympic silver medal sprint canoeist, grew up in Bærum
- Arne Bakker (1930 in Bærum – 2009) footballer with 54 caps for Norway and a bandy player
- Dordi Nordby (born 1964 in Bærum) a curler from Snarøya, with world and Euro. gold medals
- Ole Petter Pollen (born 1966) a sailor and Olympic silver medalist, lives in Stabekk
- Hans Petter Buraas (born 1975 in Bærum), Alpine skier, gold medallist, 1998 Winter Olympics
- Bjørn Einar Romøren (born 1981), ski jumper with 8 individual World Cup wins
- Henning Hauger (born 1985 in Bærum) a footballer with 350 club caps and 23 for Norway
- Caroline Westrup (born 1986) a Norwegian-Swedish professional golfer, brought up in Bærum
- Leif Kristian Nestvold-Haugen (born 1987 in Lommedalen) alpine skier, 2 Olympic bronze medals
- Marius Thorp (born 1988 in Bærum) a Norwegian former professional golfer
- Andreas Martinsen (born 1990 in Bærum), ice hockey player
- Magnus Carlsen (born 1990) a Norwegian chess grandmaster and World Champion, brought up in Bærum
- Tiril Eckhoff (born 1990 in Bærum) an Olympic champion biathlete
- twins Sanna Solberg-Isaksen and Silje Solberg (born 1990 in Bærum) handball players
- Jørgen Skjelvik (born 1991 in Hosle) a footballer with 220 club caps and 8 for Norway
- Emilie Haavi (born 1992 in Bærum), footballer, 90 caps for Norway
- Ståle Sandbech (born 1993 in Rykkinn) a silver medal snowboarder at 2014 Winter Olympics
- Sturla Holm Lægreid (born 1997 in Bærum) a biathlete, 1 Winter Olympics gold medal.
- Sander Berge (born 1998 in Bærum) a footballer with 150 club caps and 24 for Norway
- Sondre Oddvoll Bøe (born 1998 in Bærum) a figure skater, Nordic and four-time Norwegian champion
- Casper Ruud (born 1998 in Snarøya) a professional tennis player and an ATP title winner
- Geir Selvik Malthe-Sørenssen (born 1965) a con artist and convicted felon, brought up in Bærum.
- Hugo Vetlesen (born 2000) a footballer who currently plays for Bodø/Glimt
- Ayla Ågren (born 1993 in Bærum) a Norwegian-Swedish racing driver, currently residing in the United States

== International relations ==
=== Twin towns – Sister cities ===
The following cities are twinned with Bærum:

- – Frederiksberg, Region Hovedstaden, Denmark
- – Hafnarfjörður, Iceland
- – Hämeenlinna, Kanta-Häme, Finland
- – Tartu, Tartumaa, Estonia
- – Uppsala, Uppsala län, Sweden

== Gallery ==
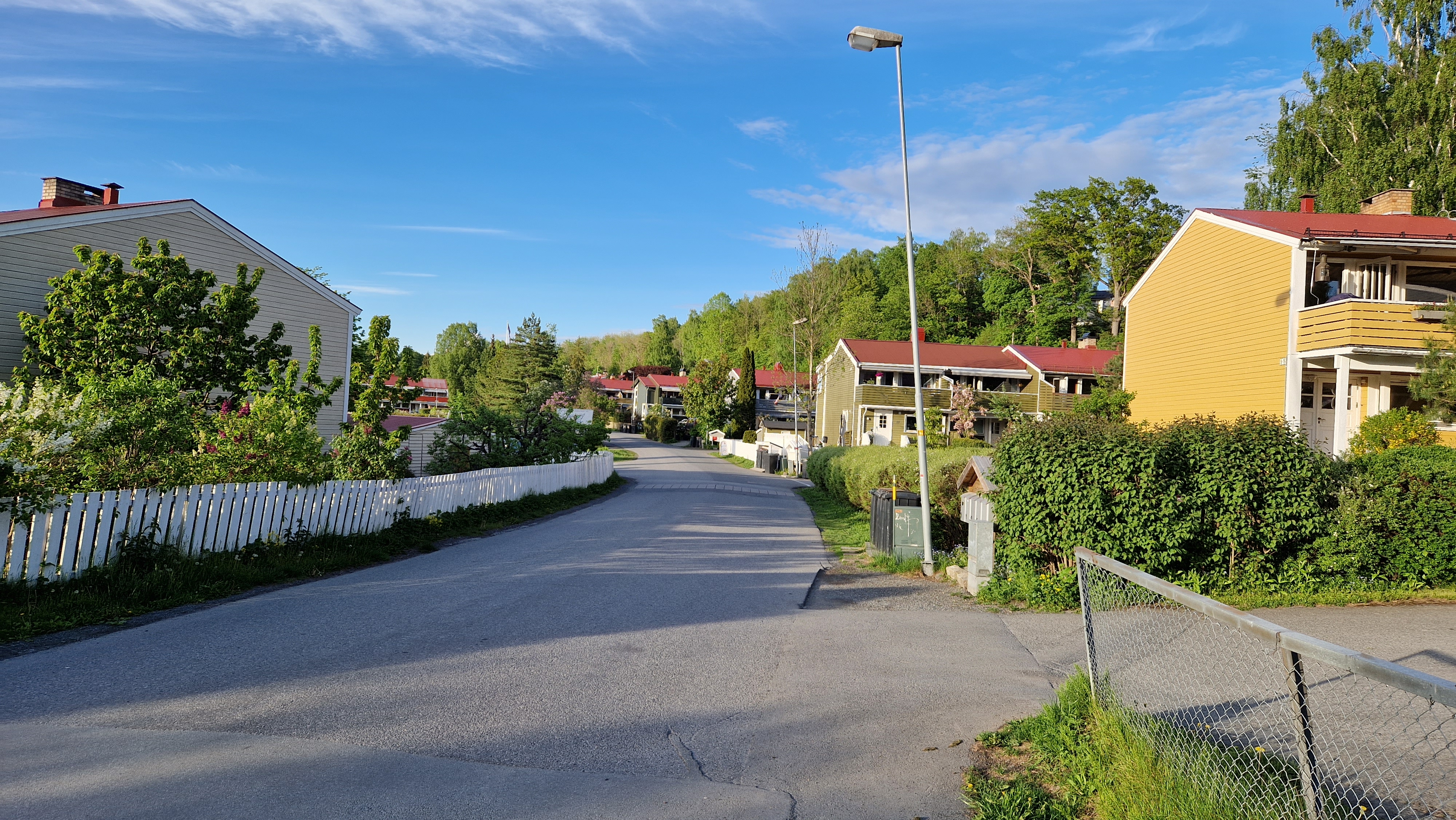
Neighbourhood in Bærum, 2022

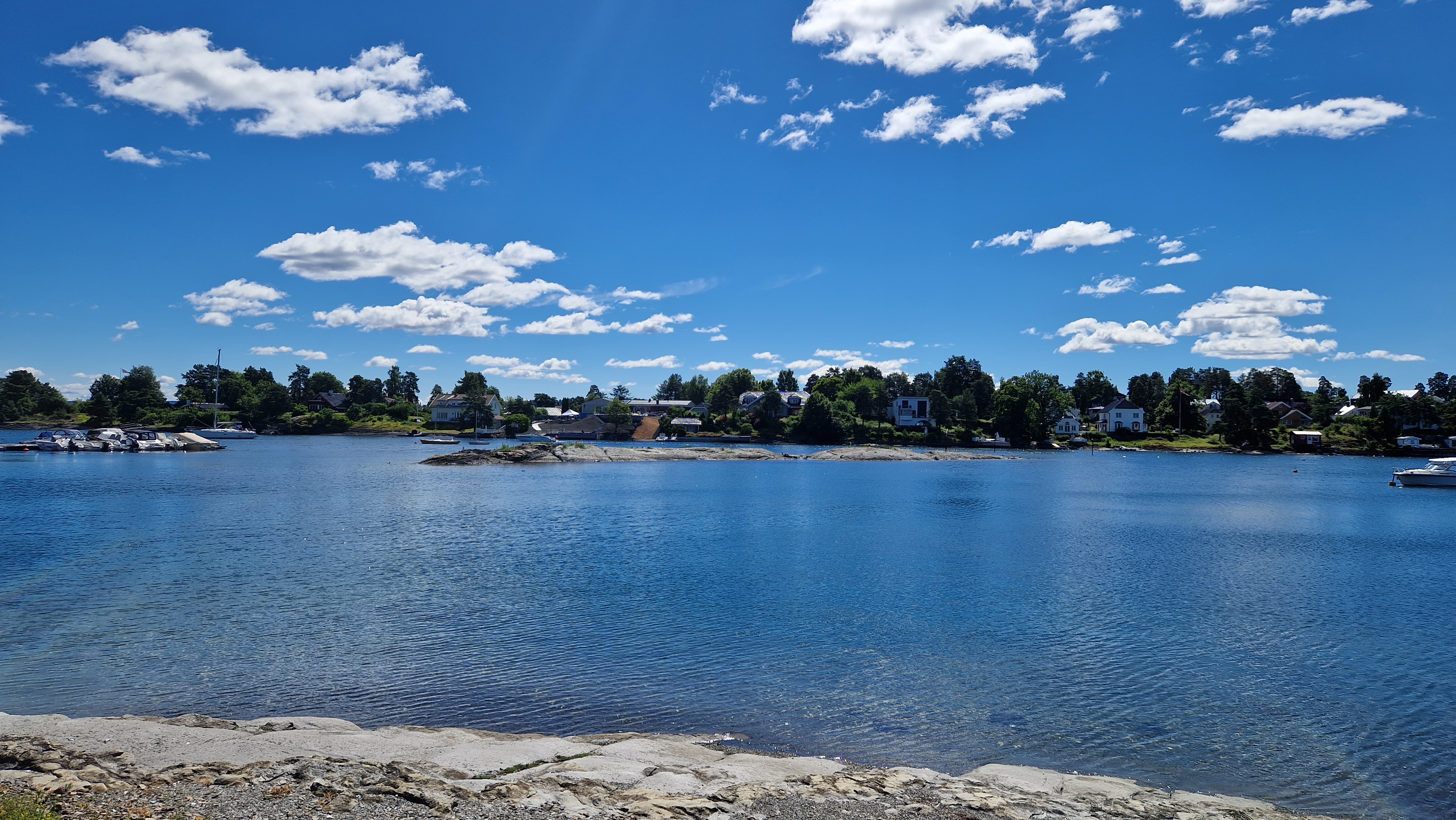
Dokkskjæret, Bærum in 2022

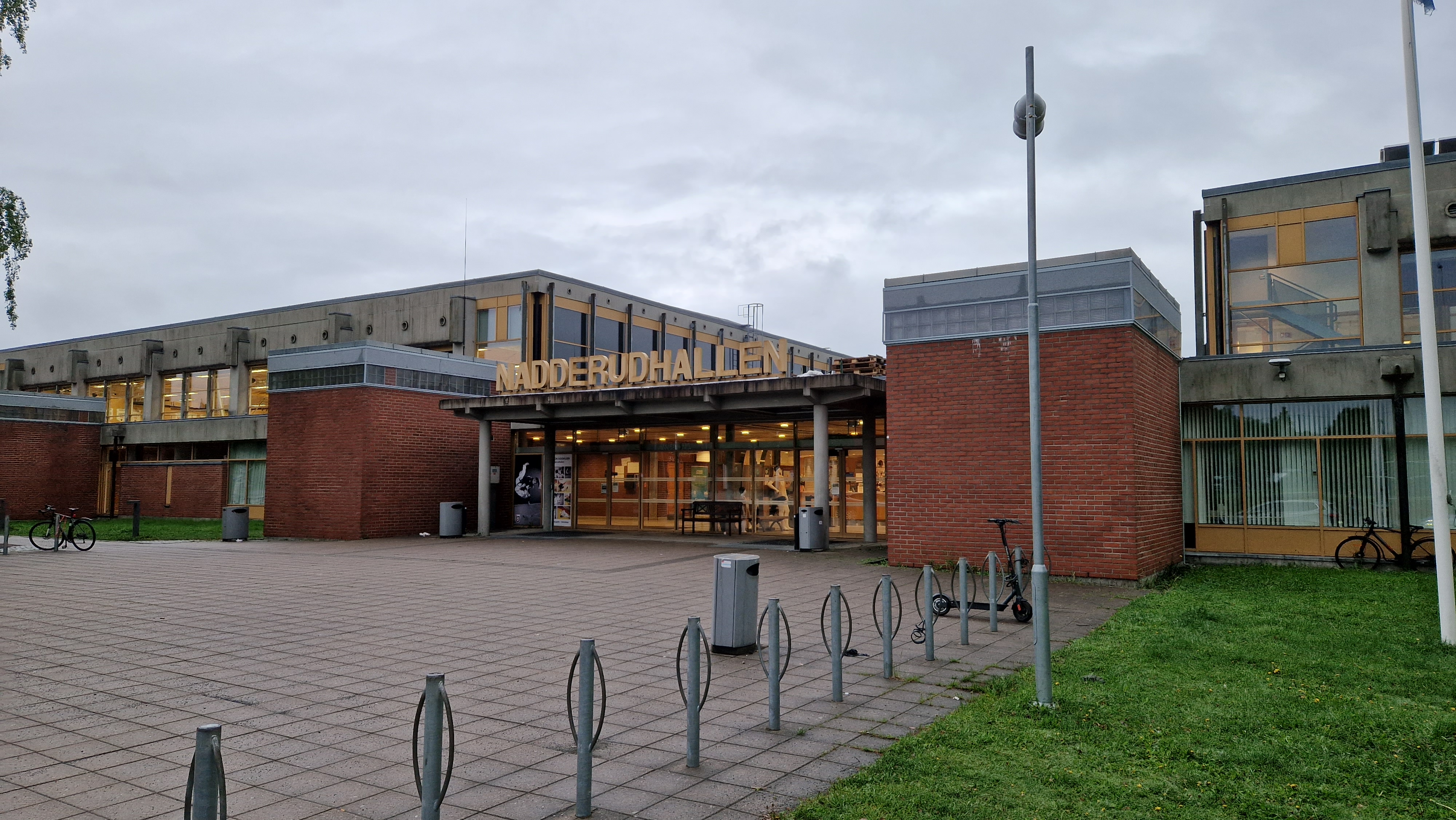
Nadderudhallen, indoor swimming pool

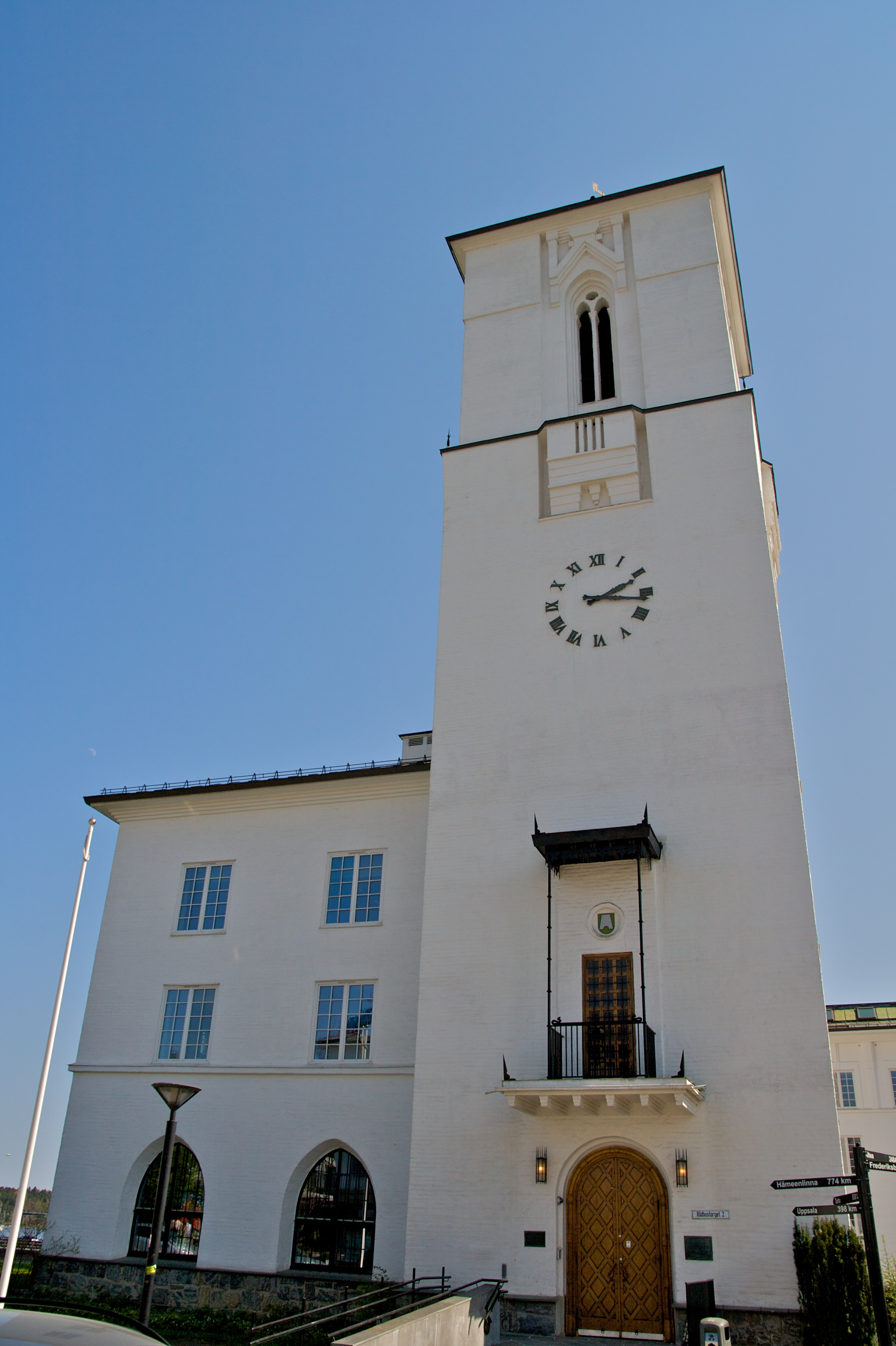
The tower of Bærum Town Hall

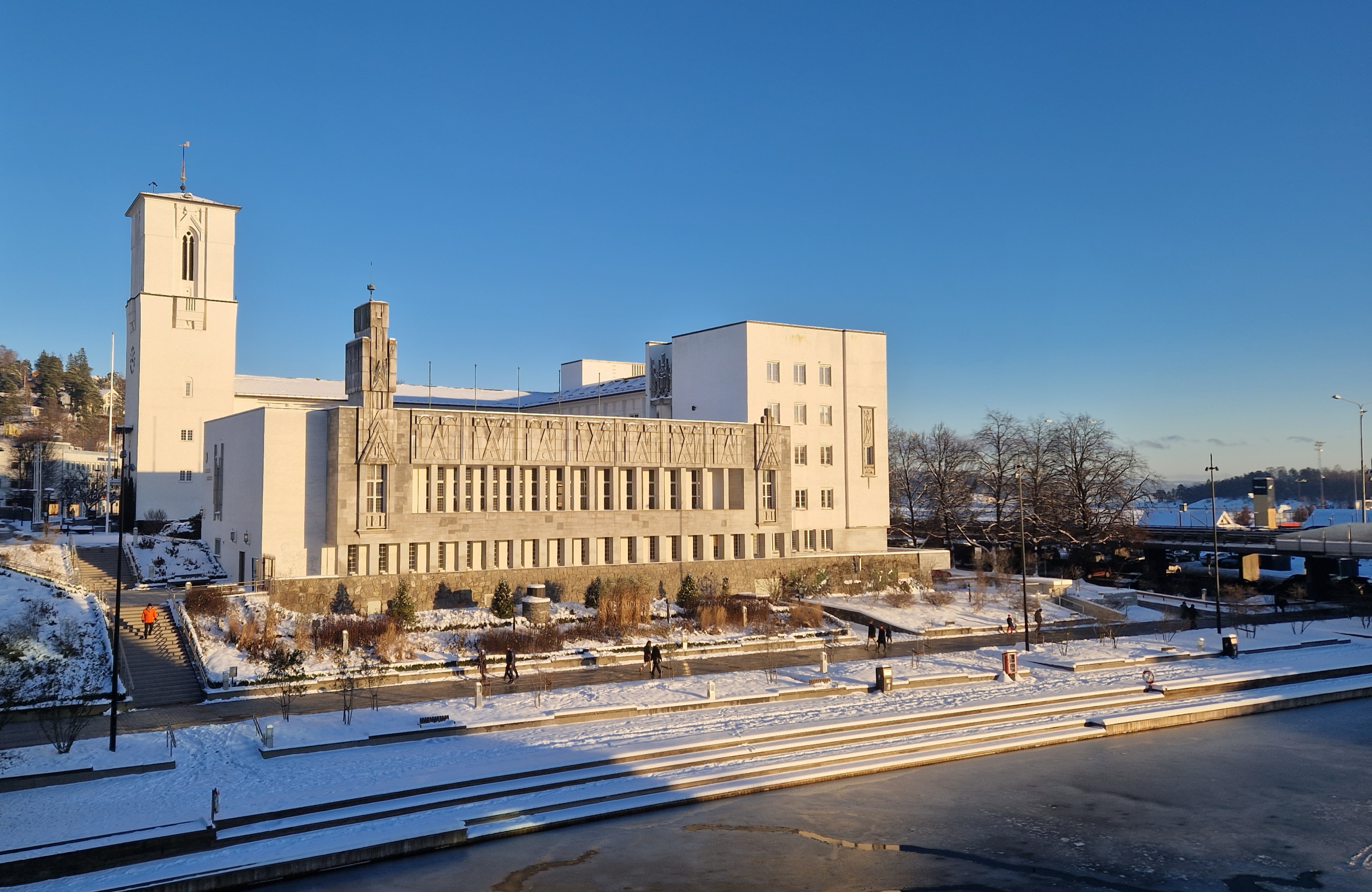

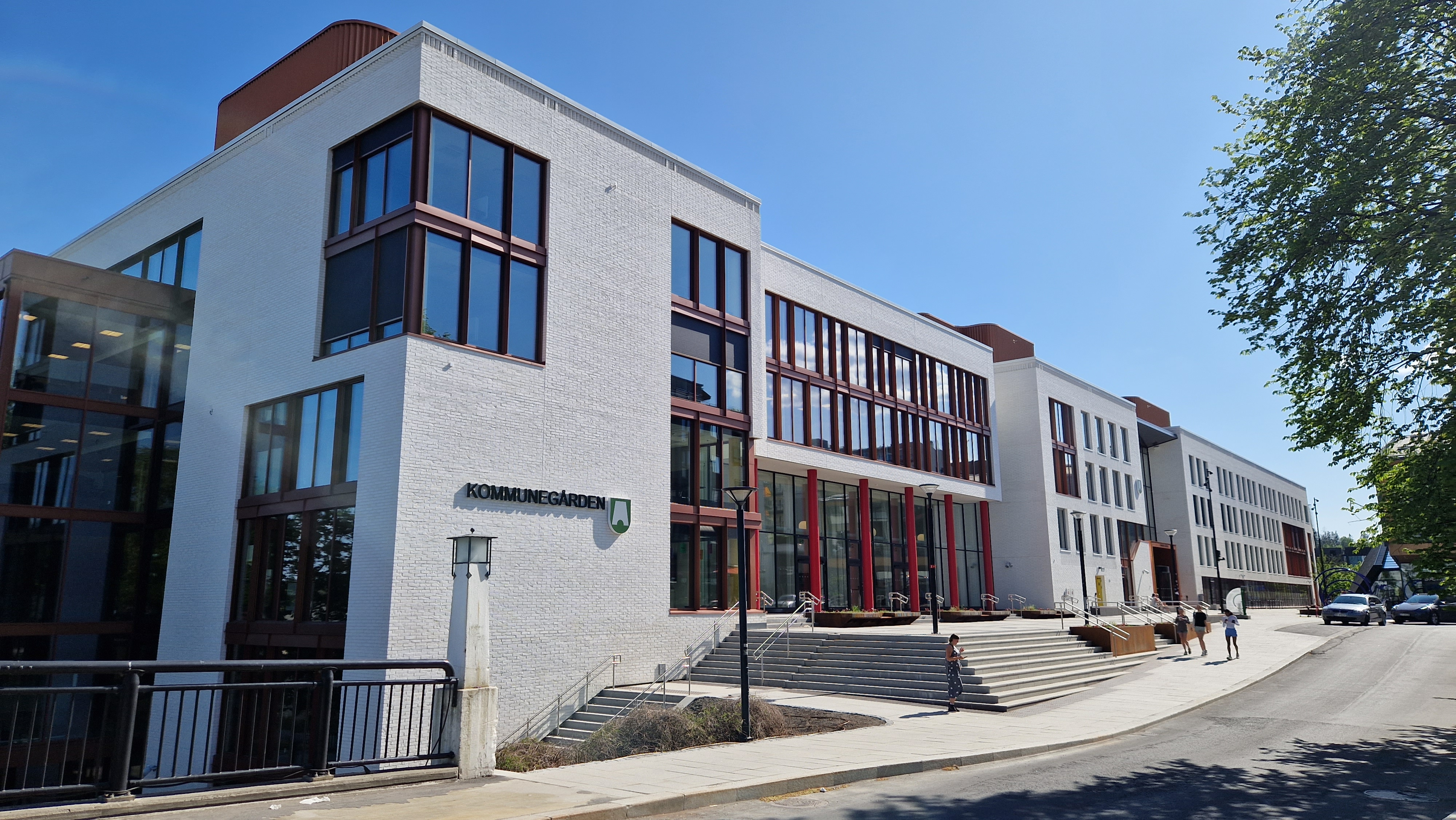
Kommunegården, 2023
