= Nordby Station =

Railway station in Ullensaker, Norway

Nordby
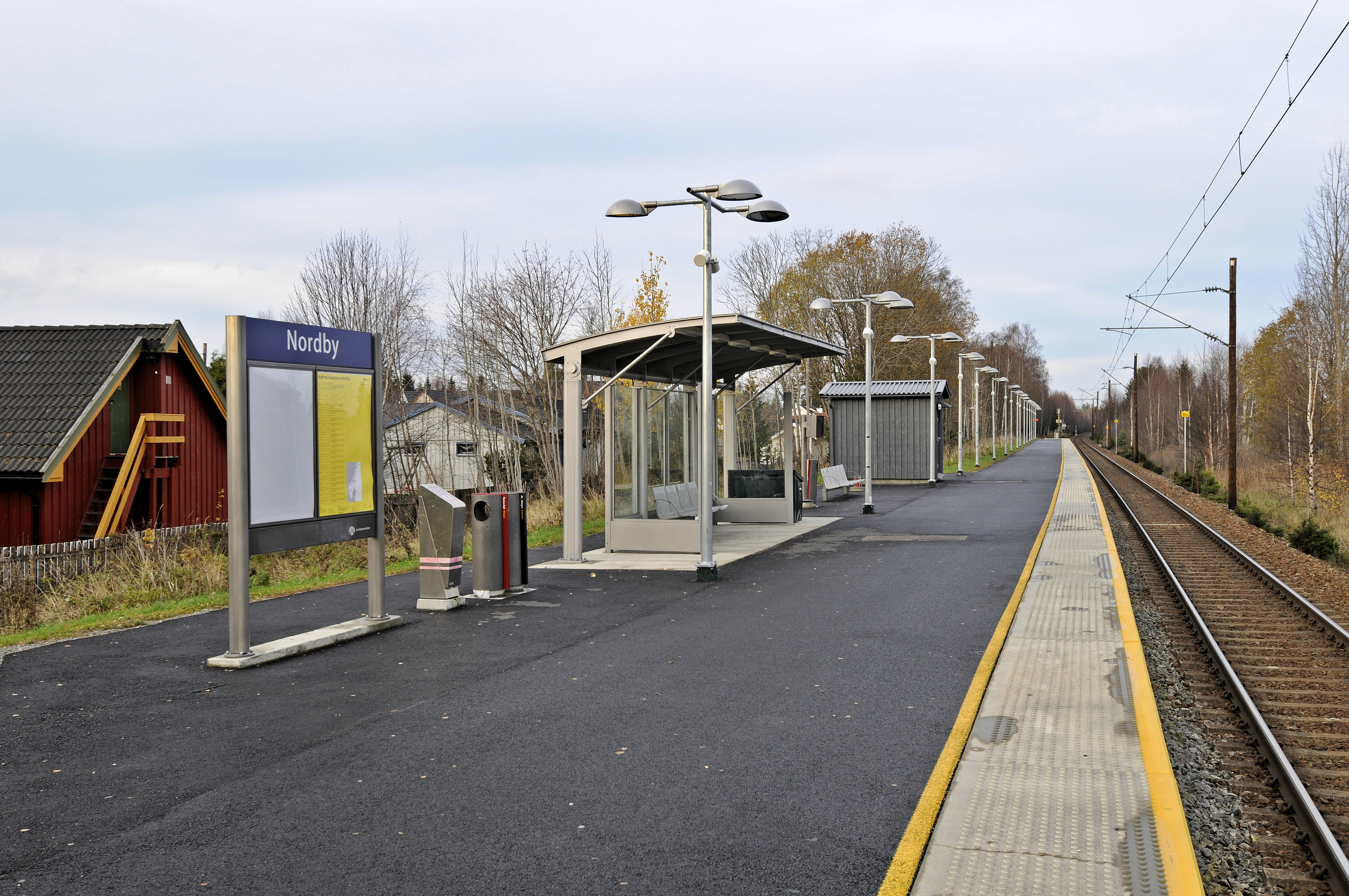

General information
- Location: Jessheim, Ullensaker; Norway
- Coordinates: 60°09′19″N 11°10′54″E
- Elevation: 207 m (679 ft)
- Owner: Bane NOR
- Operator: Vy
- Line: Trunk Line
- Distance: 46.10 km (28.65 mi)
- Platforms: 1

History
- Opened: 1932
Location
- Location within Akershus

Nordby Station is a railway station located two kilometers north of Jessheim in Ullensaker, Norway on the Trunk Line. The station was built in 1932 and is served by the Oslo Commuter Rail R13 from Drammen via Oslo S to Dal.

Preceding station			Following station
Jessheim	Trunk Line		Hauerseter
Preceding station	Local trains		Following station
Jessheim	R13	Drammen–Oslo S–Dal	Hauerseter
