= Hauerseter Station =

Railway station in Ullensaker, Norway

Hauerseter
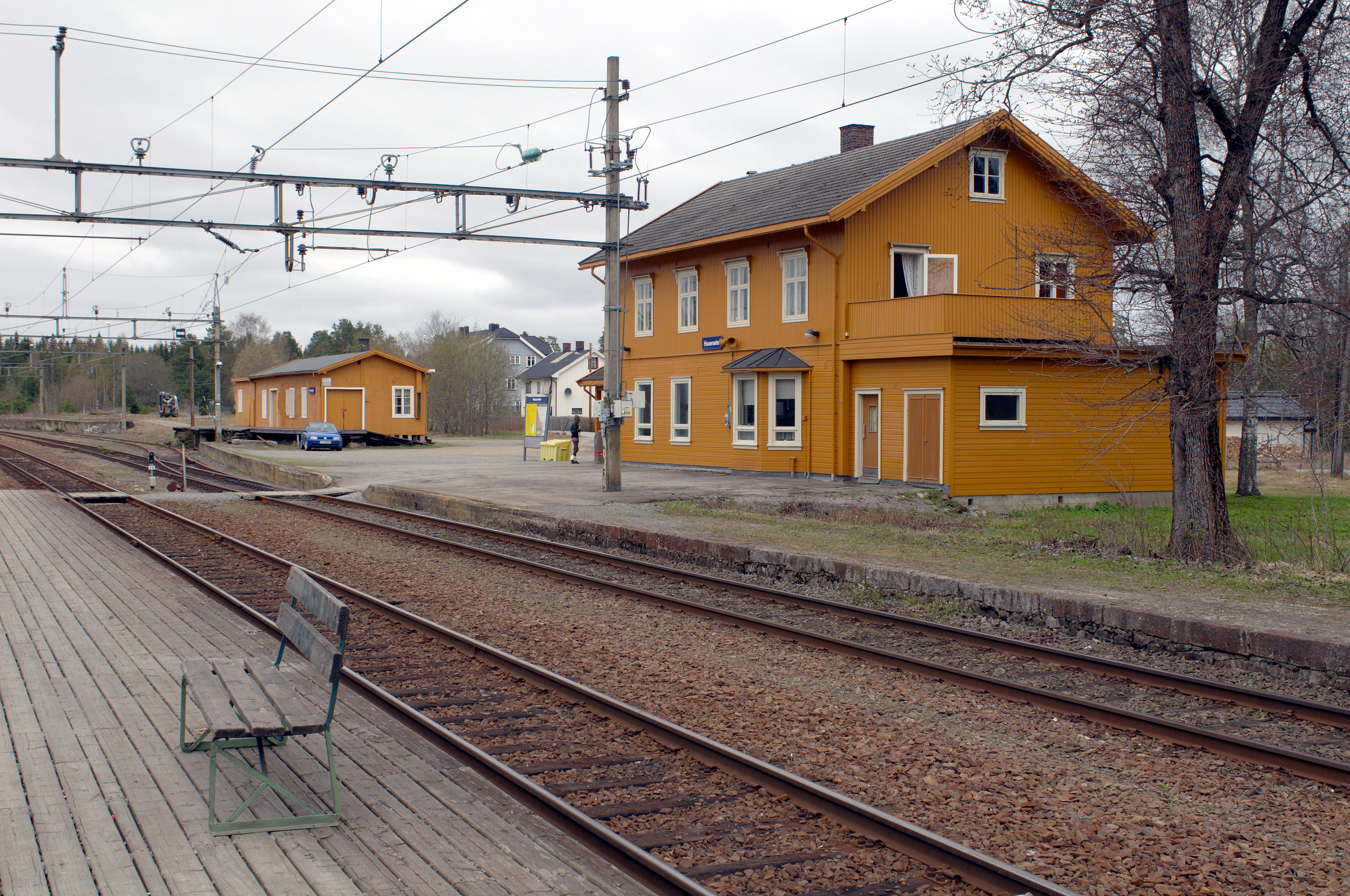

General information
- Location: Hauerseter, Ullensaker; Norway
- Coordinates: 60°11′06″N 11°11′43″E
- Elevation: 217 m (712 ft)
- Owner: Bane NOR
- Operator: Vy
- Line: Trunk Line
- Distance: 49.62 km (30.83 mi)
- Platforms: 2

History
- Opened: 1894
Location
- Location within Akershus

Hauerseter Station is a railway station located at Hauerseter in Ullensaker, Norway on the Trunk Line. The station was opened in 1894 and is served by commuter train R13 from Drammen via Oslo Central Station to Dal.

From 1947 until the construction of Gardermoen Line and Oslo Airport, Gardermoen in the 1990s, Hauerseter was the terminal station of the Hauerseter–Gardermoen Line, a branch line that went to Gardermoen Air Station.

Preceding station			Following station
Nordby	Trunk Line		Dal
Preceding station	Local trains		Following station
Nordby	R13	Drammen–Oslo S–Dal	Dal
