= Hauerseter–Gardermoen Line =

Railway line in Norway

Coordinates: 60°11′06″N 11°11′44″E

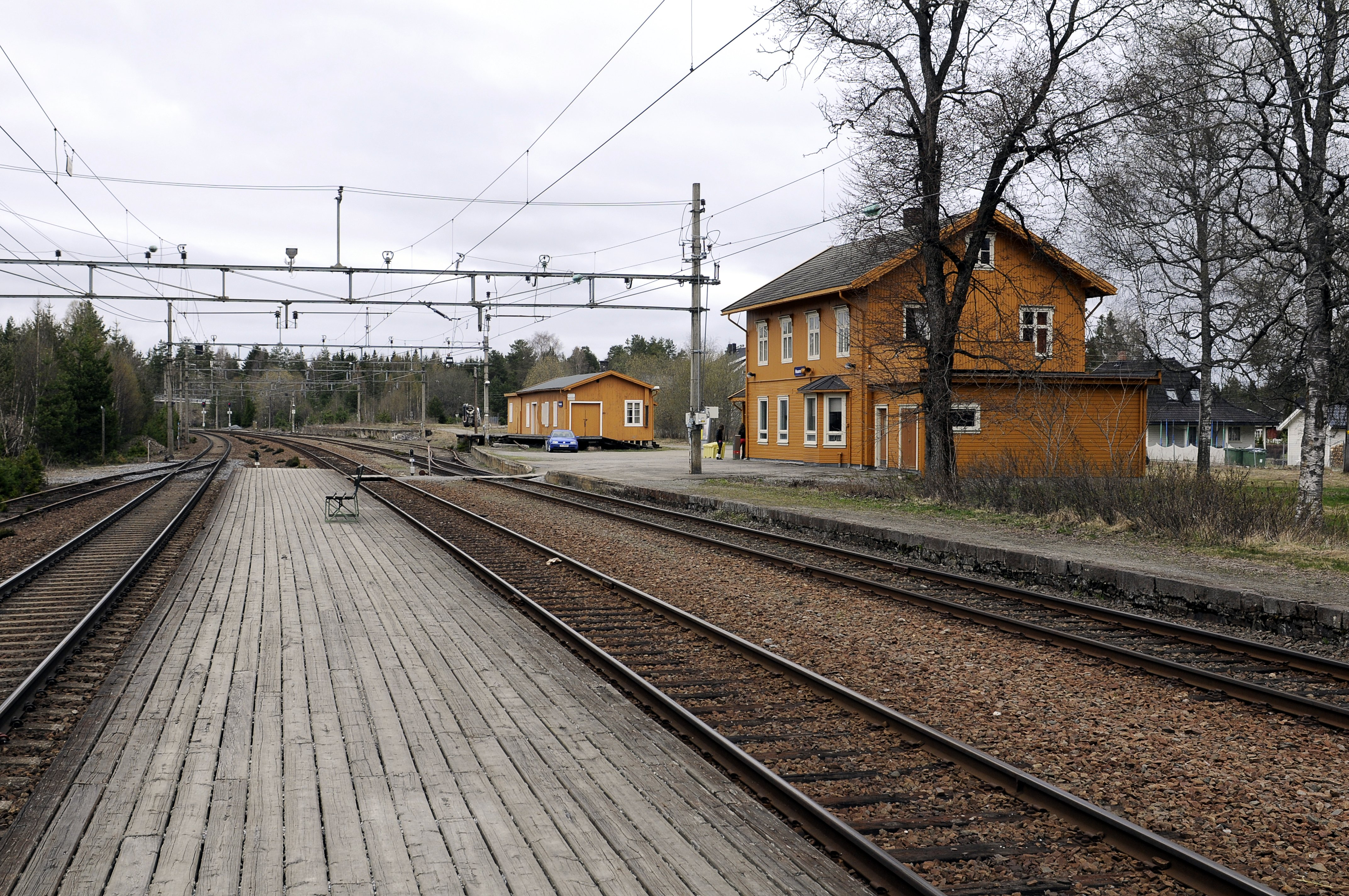
- Hauerseter Station

Overview
- Native name: Hauerseter–Gardermobanen
- Status: Abandoned
- Owner: Norwegian Air Force
- Termini: Hauerseter Station; Gardermoen Air Station

Service
- Type: Railway
- System: Norwegian railway
- Operator(s): Norwegian State Railways

History
- Opened: 13 June 1941

Technical
- Line length: 6.7 km (4.2 mi)
- Number of tracks: Single
- Character: Freight
- Track gauge: 1,435 mm (4 ft 8 1/2 in)
- Electrification: No

Hauerseter–Gardermoen Line (Norwegian: Hauerseter–Gardermobanen), previously also known as the Gardermoen Line, is an abandoned, 6.7-kilometer (4.2 mi) branch line in Ullensaker, Norway, which connected Hauerseter Station on the Trunk Line to Gardermoen Air Station. The line had three branches at Gardermoen, one of which led to Trandum.

Plans for a branch existed from the early 20th century, but the line was not built until the German occupation of Norway in 1940, when the Luftwaffe upgraded Gardermoen. The line opened on 13 June 1941. After the end of the Second World War in 1945 the line was transferred to the Royal Norwegian Air Force. The line saw limited passenger and cargo traffic, mostly the haulage of aviation fuel. From the 1970s the line fell out of general use, although it was kept in case of war. The line was finally abandoned and the tracks partly removed in the early 2000s.

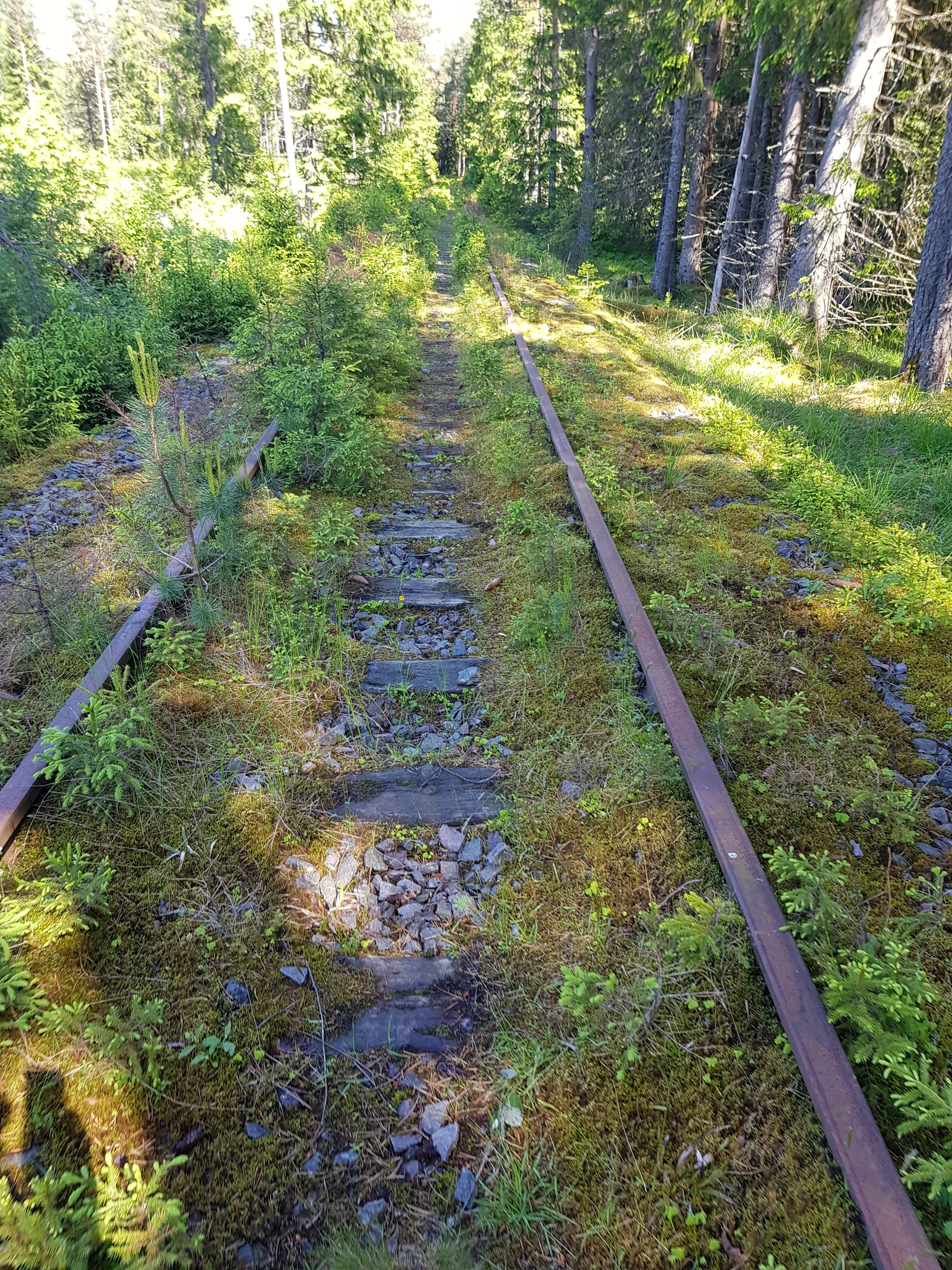

== Route ==
The railway line was 6.7 kilometers (4.2 mi) long and ran from Hauerseter Station on the Trunk Line to Gardermoen Air Station. The line was always owned as a military railway, at first by the Luftwaffe and later by the Royal Norwegian Air Force. It was trafficked by the Norwegian State Railways, but unlike the Trunk Line it was not electrified.

The lines started south of Hauerseter Station and crossed Trondheimsveien and then crossed the Sand–Li road near Vilberg. It then crossed Blikkvegen and ran downhill to it reached a branch named Lillestrøm. The northern branch ran to Trandum, then central branch to Oplandsleiren and the southern crossed Nyvegen before running into the air station. The only facility which resembled a station was a combined loading deck and warehouse at the air station's Hangar C.

== History ==
Plans for a railway to Gardermoen had first arisen after the turn of the 20th century. These had originally called for a line to run from Jessheim Station on the Trunk Line, but the plans had been abandoned in part because there was no bridge over Kvændalen. Construction of the line was instead carried from Hauerseter. During the German occupation of Norway during the Second World War, the Luftwaffe commenced major upgrades to Gardermoen Air Station, and saw the strategic value of a railway line to the installation. The line was taken into use on 13 June 1941.

The Hauerseter–Gardermoen Line was built by the German Luftwaffe who had taken over the military facilities at Gardermoen Air Station. During World War II the line was exclusively used for military transport. At first it was used to freight aviation fuel and general cargo, and later it also served military personnel. The railway also allowed the Luftwaffe to have their ammunition depot for Gardermoen located at Hauerseter. Transshipment and other operations resulted in twenty-five people working at Hauerseter Station during the war, compared to seven in 1957.

After the war ended in 1945, the line was taken over by the Norwegian Armed Forces. The large number of conscripts made the air force establish passenger traffic on the line in 1947, using Class 87 diesel multiple units. The service was quickly terminated, probably the same year. There were also some attempts to fly civilian air passengers, but these were also soon abandoned, largely because of the poor condition of the track. After this, the line was used only for freight transport, mostly military supplies, fuel and air cargo. It was also used during military practices. A spur line was built to Rustad Sawmill in 1974, introducing civilian traffic.

At the end of the 1970s, the military abandoned regular traffic on the line. The southern track was pulled up by enthusiasts from the Urskog–Høland Line, which used the track for their heritage railway. The middle track was lifted to make room for a firing range. However, the military has retained maintenance of the line so that it at any time is in operational condition, as it had high strategic importance should war break out. During the construction of the European Route E6, it was decided that a new bridge be built over the line, financed by the military budget.

The last remaining goods traffic on the line ended in 2000 and the line was completely shut down in 2004. The train tracks for the rail line has afterwards been removed in several places and the railway bridge crossing the E6 was demolished during the construction of a new 4 lane highway in 2008.
