= Lindeberg Station =

Railway station in Lindeberg, Norway

Lindeberg
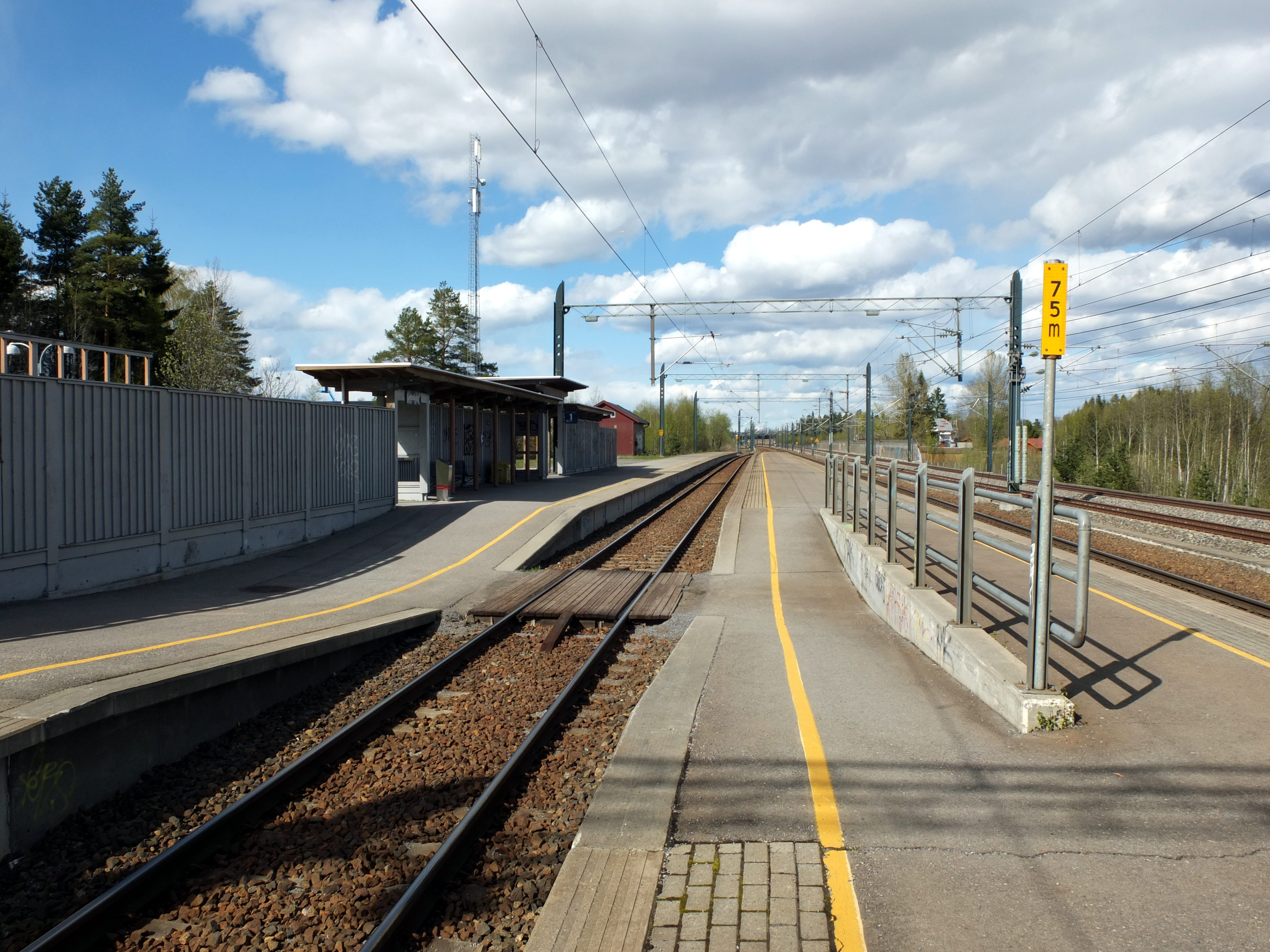

General information
- Location: Lindeberg, Sørum; Norway
- Coordinates: 60°02′22″N 11°07′41″E
- Elevation: 153 m (502 ft)
- Owner: Bane NOR
- Operator: Vy
- Line: Trunk Line
- Distance: 32.39 km

History
- Opened: 1944
Location
- Location within Akershus

Lindeberg Station is a railway station located at Lindeberg in Sørum, Norway. The station is located on the Trunk Line and was opened in 1944. The station is served by Oslo Commuter Rail trains with hourly services from Dal Station to Oslo Central Station and Drammen Station.

Preceding station			Following station
Frogner	Trunk Line		Kløfta
Preceding station	Local trains		Following station
Frogner	R13	Drammen–Oslo S–Dal	Kløfta
