= Hauerseter =

- Village
- Location within Akershus Location within Norway
- Coordinates: 60°11′10″N 11°11′48″E
- Country: Norway
- Region: Østlandet
- County: Akershus
- Time zone: UTC+01:00 (CET)
  - Summer (DST): UTC+02:00 (CEST)

Hauerseter is a village in Ullensaker, Akershus, Norway.

In rail transport, the village was covered by Hauerseter Station on the Trunk Line, formerly also a terminus on the Hauerseter–Gardermoen Line. The local sports club is Hauerseter SK.
