= Asbjørn Dørumsgard =

Norwegian politician and author (1887–1968)

Asbjørn Dørumsgard (28 February 1887 – 12 November 1968) was a Norwegian poet, newspaper editor and politician for the Labour and Social Democratic Labour parties.

== Early life ==
He was a son of school teacher A. O. Dørumsgaard and his wife Karen Dørumsgaard. The family lived in the Øvre Relingen district of what was then Fet municipality.

== Career ==
=== As a newspaper editor ===
From early on, he leaned towards the Liberals in Norwegian politics. He became editor of his first newspaper in 1909, the non-partisan Viken in Lillestrøm. Viken only lasted from January to December 1909 when it went defunct. He spent short periods as the editor of Speideren and Bonden. In 1913 Dørumsgard had become a socialist, and was hired as editor-in-chief of the new newspaper Akershus Social-Demokrat. It was supposed to cover the district Nedre Romerike from the Labour Party's partisan perspective, as Romerikes Blad published in Jessheim by M. Jul. Halvorsen did not have the regard at the time as a sufficient party outlet for all of Romerike. Dørumsgaard was however succeeded as editor by Halvorsen in 1916.

=== As a politician ===
External image
- Dørumsgaard with Crown Prince Olav, 1934.

Dørumsgard also served as mayor of Fet from 1914 to 1929. The municipality was then split into Fet and Rælingen, and with Dørumsgaard residing in the latter municipality, he became the first mayor of Rælingen, serving until 1931.

In 1921 he joined the Social Democratic Labour Party. In the first and only general election contested by this party, in 1924, he was the sixth candidate on the Akershus ballot headed by Harald Halvorsen. Dørumsgard later headed the ballot of the one-off party Akershus Socialdemokratiske Parti, which contested the 1933 Norwegian parliamentary election without winning a seat. Dørumsgaard also founded the Social Democratic newspaper Lillestrømsposten, which was incorporated by Akershus Arbeiderblad in 1931.

=== As a poet ===
Dørumsgard had a significant literary production, publishing fifteen poetry collections. Among his best works are the collections Under plogen (1910) and Jordmål (1937). He was also a local historian with works such as Fet og Rælingen herreder i hundreåret 1837–1937, published 100 years after the Formannskapsdistrikt was established, and Rælingen. Trekk av bygdehistorien (1955).
