= Kløfta Station =

Railway station in Ullensaker, Norway

Kløfta
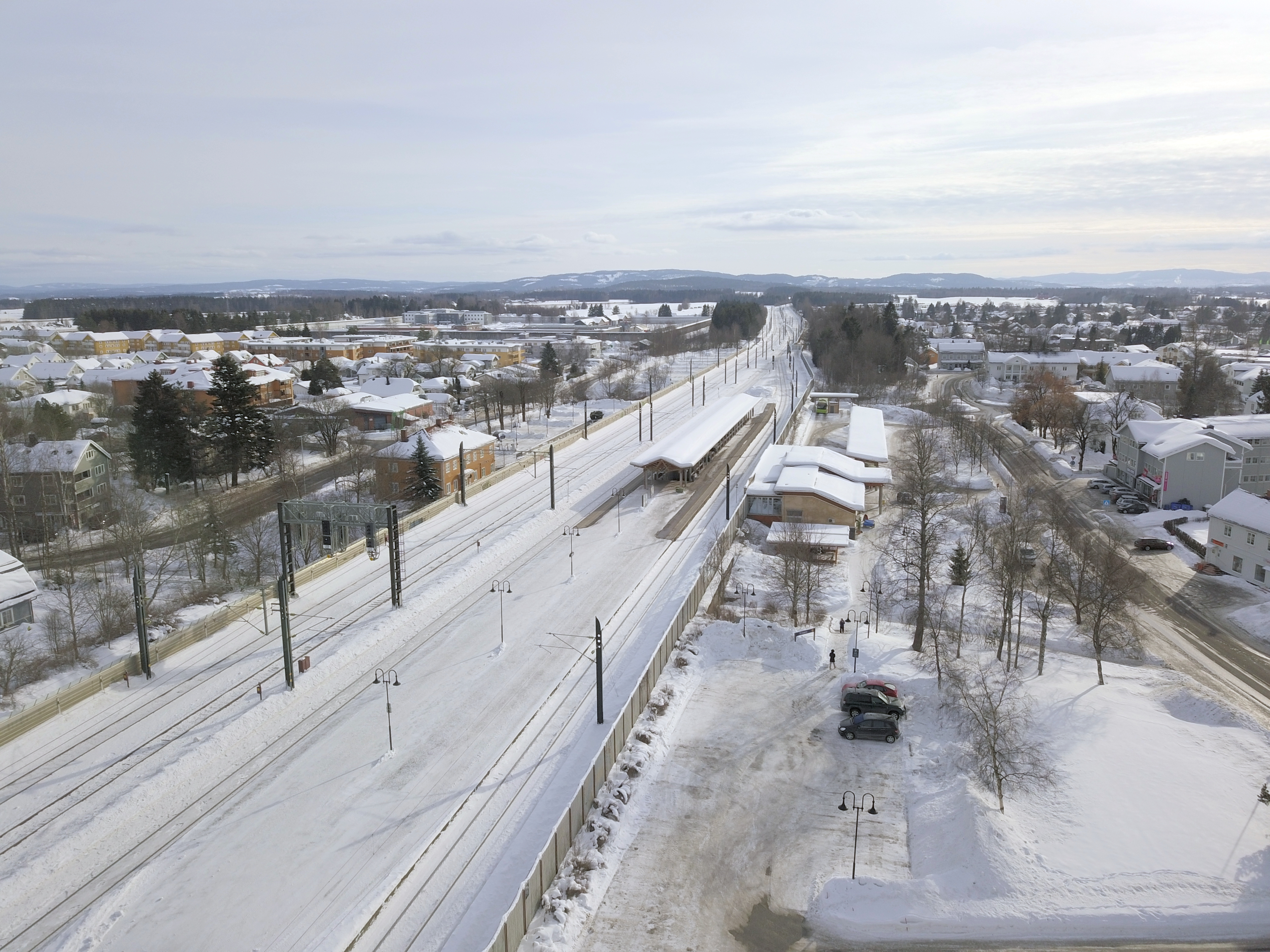
- Kløfta station seen from the north towards the south

General information
- Location: Kløfta, Ullensaker; Norway
- Coordinates: 60°04′31″N 11°08′21″E
- Elevation: 168.5 m (553 ft)
- Owner: Bane NOR
- Operator: Vy
- Lines: Gardermoen Line; Trunk Line
- Distance: 36.48 km
- Platforms: 2
- Connections: Bus: Ruter

History
- Opened: 1854
Location
- Location within Akershus

Kløfta Station (Norwegian: Kløfta stasjon) was opened at Kløfta in 1854 as a part of Norway's first railway, the Trunk Line between Oslo and Eidsvoll.

The station was originally called Kløften, but the name was changed to Kløfta in 1920. A new station was built at Kløfta as part of the construction of the Gardermoen Line in 1998.

Preceding station			Following station
Lindeberg	Trunk Line		Jessheim
Preceding station	Local trains		Following station
Lindeberg	R13	Drammen–Oslo S–Dal	Jessheim
