= Frogner Station =

Railway station in Frogner, Norway

Frogner
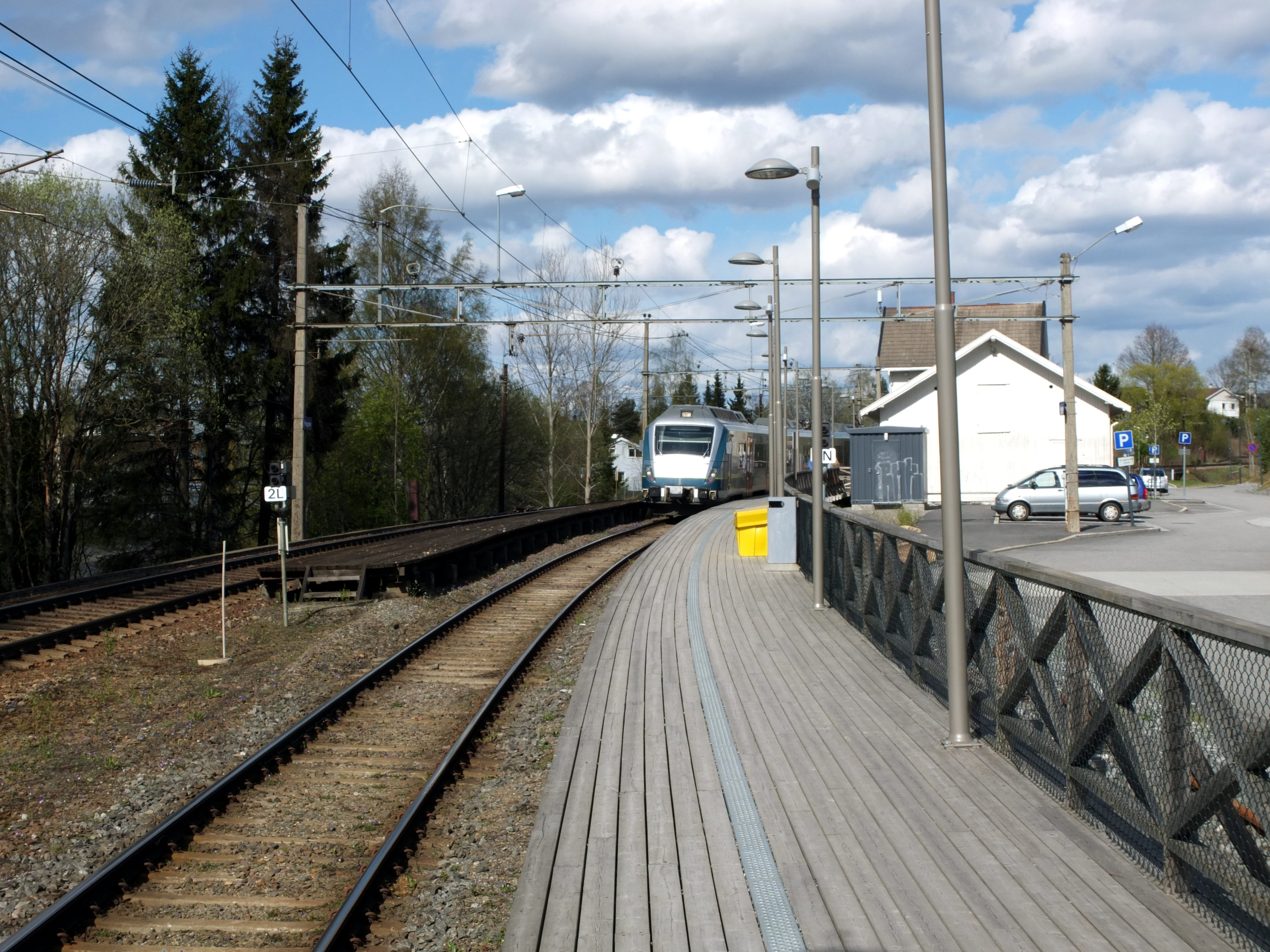

General information
- Location: Frogner, Norway
- Coordinates: 60°01′22″N 11°06′11″E
- Elevation: 124.7 m (409 ft) AMSL
- Owner: Bane NOR
- Operator: Vy
- Line: Trunk Line
- Distance: 29.86 km (18.55 mi)
- Platforms: 2
- Connections: Bus: Ruter

History
- Opened: 1854
Location
- Location within Akershus

Frogner Station is a railway station at Frogner in Akershus, Norway on the Trunk Line. The station was opened in 1854 as part of the Trunk Line. It is served by twice-hourly service R13 by Vy.

Preceding station			Following station
Leirsund	Trunk Line		Lindeberg
Preceding station	Local trains		Following station
Leirsund	R13	Drammen–Oslo S–Dal	Lindeberg
