= Østby =

Østby may refer to:

== Places ==
- Østby, Innlandet, a village in the municipality of Trysil in Innlandet county, Norway
- Østby, Trøndelag, a village in the municipality of Tydal in Trøndelag county, Norway

== See also ==
- Østbye, a surname
- Østbyen, Norway
- Vestby, Norway
- Nordby (disambiguation)
- Sörby (disambiguation)
