= Jessheim Station =

Railway station in Ullensaker, Norway

Jessheim
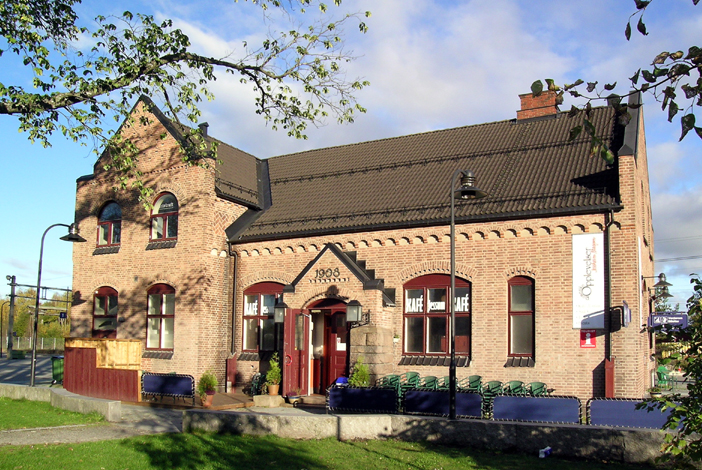

General information
- Location: Jessheim, Ullensaker; Norway
- Coordinates: 60°08′32″N 11°10′37″E
- Elevation: 203.8 meters (669 ft) AMSL
- Owner: Bane NOR
- Operator: Vy
- Line: Trunk Line
- Distance: 44.60 km (27.71 mi)
- Platforms: 2
- Connections: Bus: Ruter

History
- Opened: 1854
Location
- Location within Akershus

Jessheim Station (Norwegian: Jessheim stasjon) is a railway station at Jessheim which opened in 1854. It is 44.60 kilometers (27.71 mi) from Oslo Central Station and has an elevation of 203.8 meters (669 ft) above mean sea level. The station is part of Norway's first railway, the Trunk Line, which ran from Kristiania (today known as Oslo) to Eidsvoll.

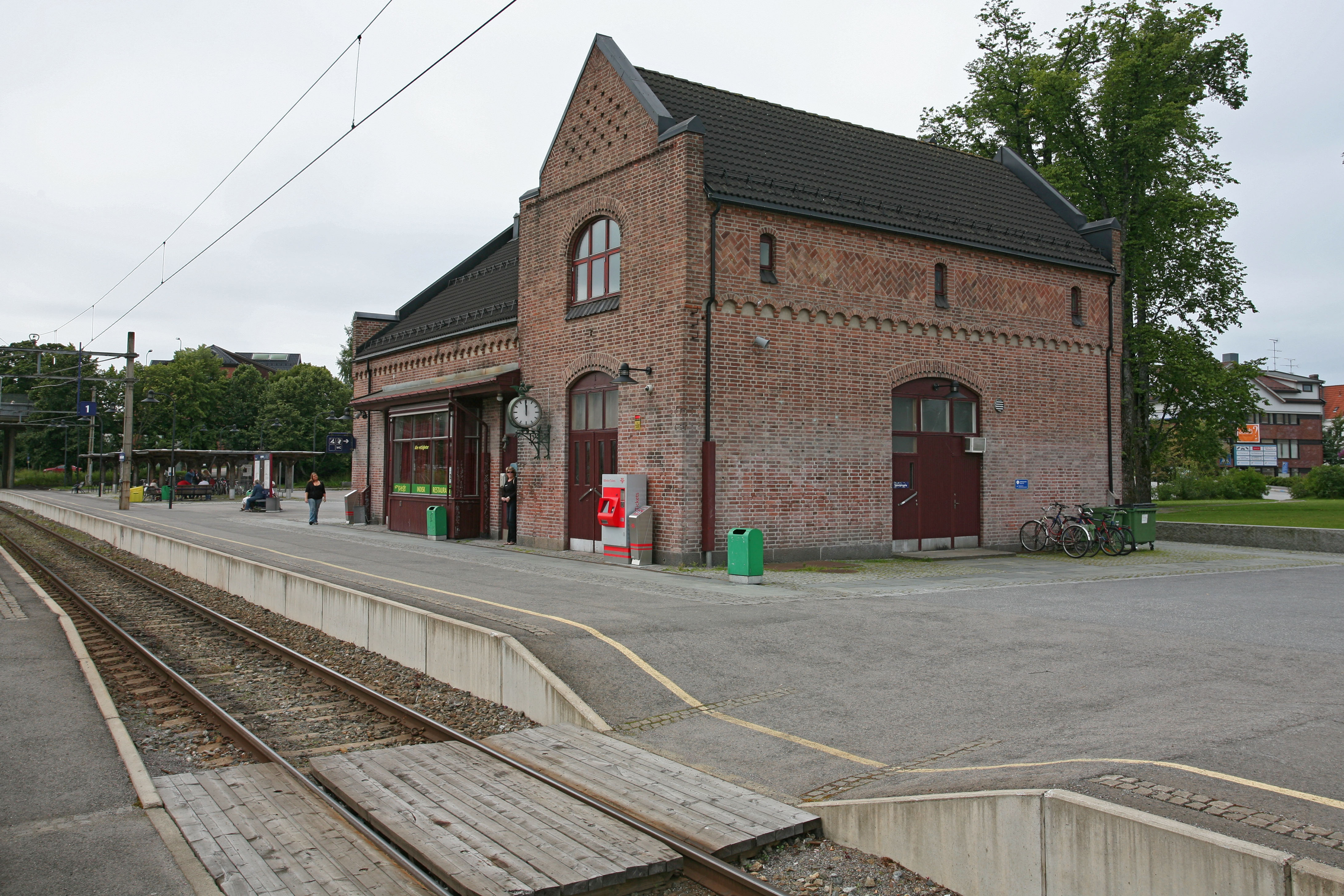
Jessheim Station seen from the platform

The railroad had at the time of construction in 1854 named it Trøgstad, but due to the confusion with the town named Trøgstad in Østfold the name was changed in 1897 to Jessum. However, since the name was used blasphemically by some, in particular military recruits, who said they had come through Bøn (town north of Jessheim whose name sounds like 'prayer') to Jessum (which may sound like 'Jesus'). The local priests complained to the bishop who in 1900 discussed the matter with the parish council and suggested the form Jessheim. The name was changed to Jesseim. In 1920, the name was changed to Jessheim.

The station has a brick building completed in 1908. The original building burned to the ground in the summer of 1904 after a robbery where the cash register was stolen. The station originally had a water tower to supply the steam locomotives running on the railway. Starting in 1935 the station operated a railway restaurant for a few years.

The restaurant was established on 4 February 1923 and was originally run by Norsk Spisevognselskap. From 1 April 1925, operation was taken over by the station master. The ticketing personnel were replaced by ticketing machines in September 2005. Shortly thereafter the building was taken over by Romerike Opplevelser AS and converted to a shop and cafe named Kafé Jessum. In 2007 the building was converted to a restaurant serving Indian food.

Preceding station			Following station
Kløfta	Trunk Line		Nordby
Preceding station	Local trains		Following station
Kløfta	R13	Drammen–Oslo S–Dal	Nordby
