= Leirsund Station =

Railway station in Skedsmo, Norway

Leirsund
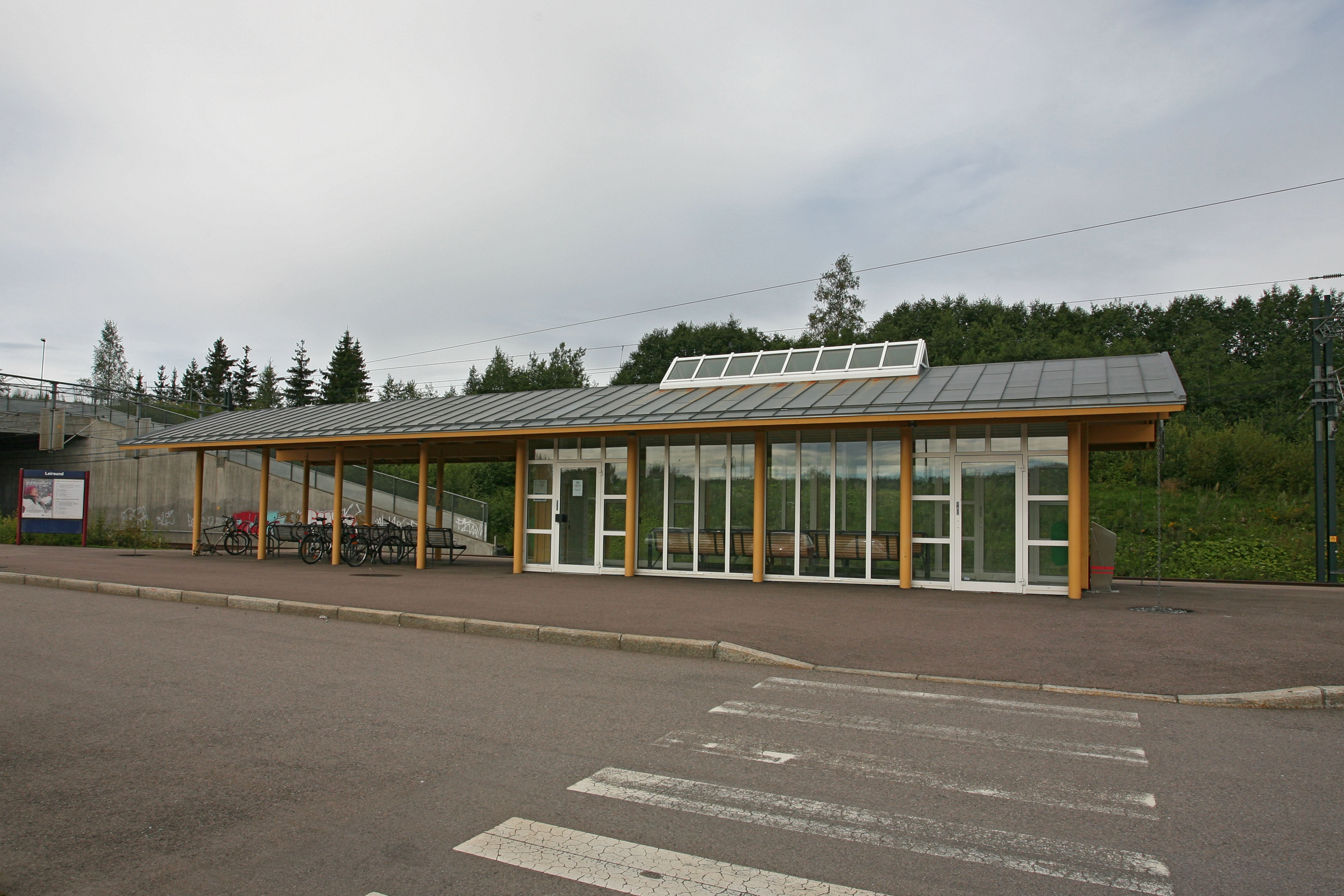

General information
- Location: Leirsund, Skedsmo; Norway
- Coordinates: 60°00′00″N 11°05′13″E
- Elevation: 108.4 m (356 ft) AMSL
- Owner: Bane NOR
- Operator: Vy
- Line: Trunk Line
- Distance: 26.87 km (16.70 mi)
- Platforms: 1
- Connections: Bus: Ruter

History
- Opened: 1859
Location
- Location within Akershus

Leirsund Station is a railway station at Leirsund in Skedsmo, Norway on the Trunk Line. It is served by an hourly services, R13 by Vy. The station was opened in 1859, five years after the rest of Hovedbanen. When the Gardermoen Line was built in 1998 Leirsund was rebuilt and slightly moved.

Preceding station			Following station
Lillestrøm	Trunk Line		Frogner
Preceding station	Local trains		Following station
Lillestrøm	R13	Drammen–Oslo S–Dal	Frogner
