= Leirsund =

- Village
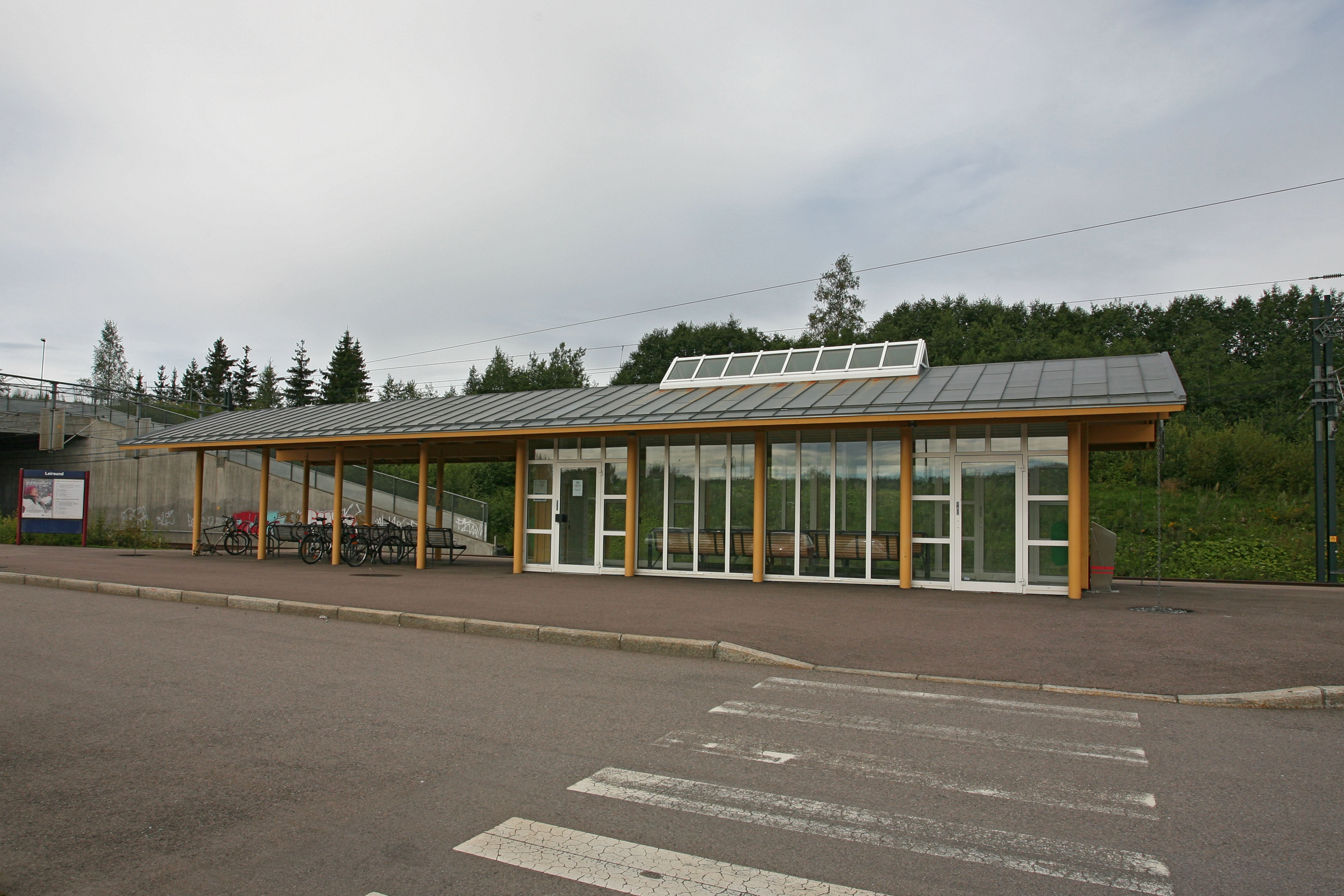
- Leirsund railway station in 2007

- Location in Akershus
- Coordinates: 60°00′N 11°06′E
- Country: Norway
- Region: Østlandet
- County: Akershus
- Municipality: Lillestrøm
- Time zone: UTC+01:00 (CET)
  - Summer (DST): UTC+02:00 (CEST)

Leirsund is a village in the municipality of Lillestrøm, Norway. Its population (2005) is 1,177, of which 83 people live within the border of the neighboring municipality Sørum.

The village has a rail station Leirsund Station on the Norwegian Trunk Line.
