= Nordby =

Nordby may refer to:

== People ==
- Bente Nordby (born 1974), Norwegian football player
- Daniel Nordby (born 1978), American politician
- Dordi Nordby (born 1964), Norwegian curler
- Erika Nordby (born 2000)
- Heidi Nordby Lunde (born 1973), Norwegian politician
- Randi Nordby (1926–1991), Norwegian actress
- Siri Nordby (born 1978), Norwegian football player
- Sverre Nordby (1910–1978), Norwegian football player
- Trond Nordby (born 1943), Norwegian historian and political scientist

== Places ==
- Nordby, Fanø, Denmark
- Nordby, Samsø, Denmark
- Nordby Station, Norway
