= Knut Ljøgodt =

Norwegian art historian

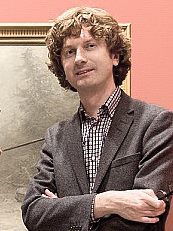
Knut Ljøgodt

Knut Ljøgodt knʉt jøɡɔt (born 1968 in Ullensaker) is a Norwegian art historian. He was museum director of The Northern Norway Art Museum in Tromsø between 2008-2016 and founding director of Kunsthall Svalbard in Longyearbyen since 2015. In the past he held curatorial positions in The National Museum, Oslo, The Munch Museum and Blaafarveverket.

== Education ==
Ljøgodt holds a cand.philol. degree from University of Oslo and a Dr. Philos. from University of Tromsø. He also studied at Courtauld Institute of Art in London and the University of Oslo's Norwegian Institute in Rome.

== Research and exhibitions ==
Amongst Ljøgodt's speciality fields are Scandinavian and European art from the 1800s, as well as modern Norwegian art. He has written several publications within these fields and been responsible for exhibitions such as Black Romance – Gothic Horror and Decadence (2009), A. K. Dolven – Ahead (2009), History Depicted (2011/2012), Knud Baade – Moonlight Romantic (2012), David Hockney – The Northern Landscapes (2012), Olav Christopher Jenssen – The Donation (2014) and Peder Balke – Vision and Revolution (2014), in collaboration with The National Gallery of London. In 2019 he co-curated the exhibition Edward Burne-Jones: The Pre-Raphalites and the North, which was first shown at Prins Eugens Waldemarsudde in Stockholm and then in 2020 at KODE – Art Museums and Composer Homes, Bergen. Ljøgodt has also initiated or curated several major exhibitions on Sámi historic and contemporary art, such as Sámi Stories: Art and Identity of an Arctic People (2014, Nordnorsk kunstmuseum, Tromsø; 2014, Scandinavia House, New York; 2014 Anchorage Museum) and Histories: Three generations of Sámi Artists, (2019, Queen Sonja Art Stables, The Royal Palace, Oslo).

In February 2015 Ljøgodt initiated the establishment of a satellite of The Northern Norway Art Museum under the name of Kunsthall Svalbard in the Spitzbergen town of Longyearbyen. The space is dedicated to international contemporary art. In 2018 he co-founded the non-profit organisation Nordic Institute of Art, a private research institution for the promotion of Nordic art history internationally. Ljøgodt has also been devoted to promote cultural ties between Scandinavia and Spain, for which he was awarded The Order of Isabella the Catholic, in the rank of Encomienda (commander) with treatment of Ilustríssimo señor,
