= Romerikes Blad =

Norwegian newspaper

- Type: Daily newspaper
- Format: Tabloid
- Owner: Amedia
- Editor: Magne Storedal
- Founded: 1902
- Political alignment: Independent
- Headquarters: Kjeller
- Website: www.rb.no

Romerikes Blad is a local newspaper published in Lillestrøm, Norway. It covers the Romerike district.

== History and profile ==
Romerikes Blad was established by Martin Julius Halvorsen in 1902 in Jessheim under the name Akershusingen, and was affiliated with the Norwegian Labour Party. The name Romerikes Blad was taken in 1905.

Between 1953 and 1967 it expanded from two to five editions a week. It mainly covered Ullensaker, Nannestad and Gjerdrum, although offices at Kjeller were opened in 1974. In 1990 it merged with the larger newspaper Akershus Arbeiderblad, which mainly covered Skedsmo, Rælingen, Fet, Sørum and Lørenskog. The two newspapers had shared the same editor-in-chief for some time. Romerikes Blad had been the smaller newspaper before the merger, with a circulation of 10,694 copies in 1983 compared to Akershus Arbeiderblad which had 24,529 copies. Nonetheless, after an initial period under the name Akershus/Romerikes Blad, the name Romerikes Blad was used. The editor-in-chief at the time of the merger was Terje Granerud (1989-2001).

Today, Romerikes Blad is owned 100% by Amedia, like many former Labour-affiliated newspapers. It has a circulation of 37,653 copies of which 36,166 are subscribers.
