= Gudmund Sundby =

Norwegian hydroelectric engineer and professor (1878-1973)

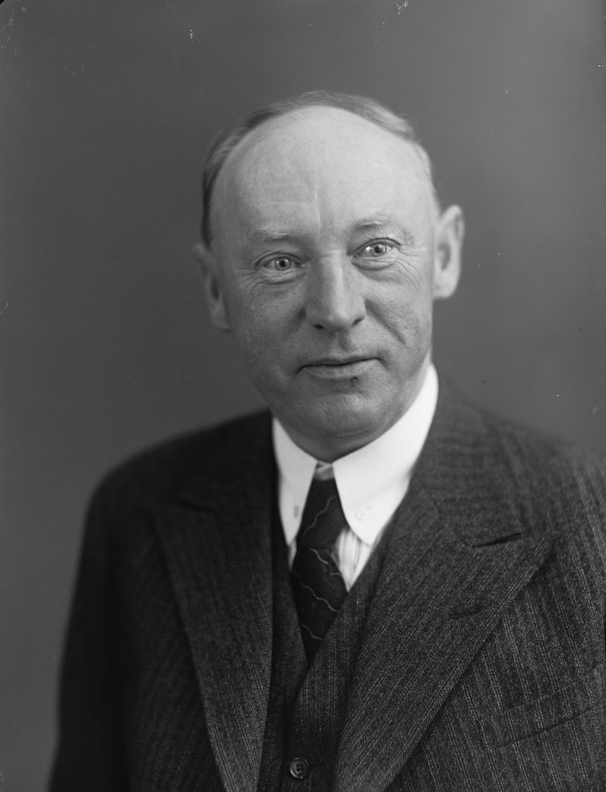
- Born: 18 January 1878; Ullensaker, Norway
- Died: 16 February 1973 (aged 95)
- Occupation: Professor of hydroelectricity

Gudmund Sundby (18 January 1878 – 16 February 1973) was a Norwegian hydroelectric engineer and university professor.

== Biography ==
Sundby was born at Ullensaker in Akershus, Norway. He was a son of Halvor Gudmundsen Sundby and Gina Jakobsdatter. He was a student at Kristiania Technical School (today a part of Oslo University College) and took the mechanical engineering exam in 1898, after which he was employed by Kværner. He went on a study trip to the United States from 1904 and completed a course of study during 1907 in Switzerland and Italy. Sundby developed an automatic turbine regulator that was patented in 1909. He served as chief engineer for the turbine department at Kværner from 1905 to 1912.

He was appointed professor of hydroelectricity at the Norwegian Institute of Technology from 1911 to 1952. He was also managing director the Hydroelectric Laboratory at the university which was completed in 1917.

Sundby was a member of the Royal Norwegian Society of Sciences and Letters from 1928. He was decorated Knight, First Class of the Order of St. Olav in 1949. A portrait of Sundby, painted by Jean Heiberg, is located at the Norwegian University of Science and Technology.
