= Oscar Fonbæk =

Norwegian athlete

Personal information
- Nationality: Norwegian
- Born: 6 July 1887 Ullensaker, Norway
- Died: 7 September 1965 (aged 78) Oslo, Norway

Sport
- Sport: Long-distance running
- Event: Marathon

Lars Oscar Fonbæk (6 July 1887 – 7 September 1965) was a Norwegian long-distance runner.

He was born in Ullensaker, but represented the club IF Torodd in Oslo. In 1908 he won a bronze medal in the 1500 metres and a silver medal in the 5000 metres. In 1909 he set two unofficial Norwegian records in the 3000 metres and the 1 hour run. He competed in the marathon at the 1912 Summer Olympics, but did not finish the race. His personal best marathon time was 2:44.30 hours, achieved in 1912.
