= Bøn Station =

Railway station in Eidsvoll, Norway

Coordinates: 60°17′33″N 11°12′46″E

Bøn
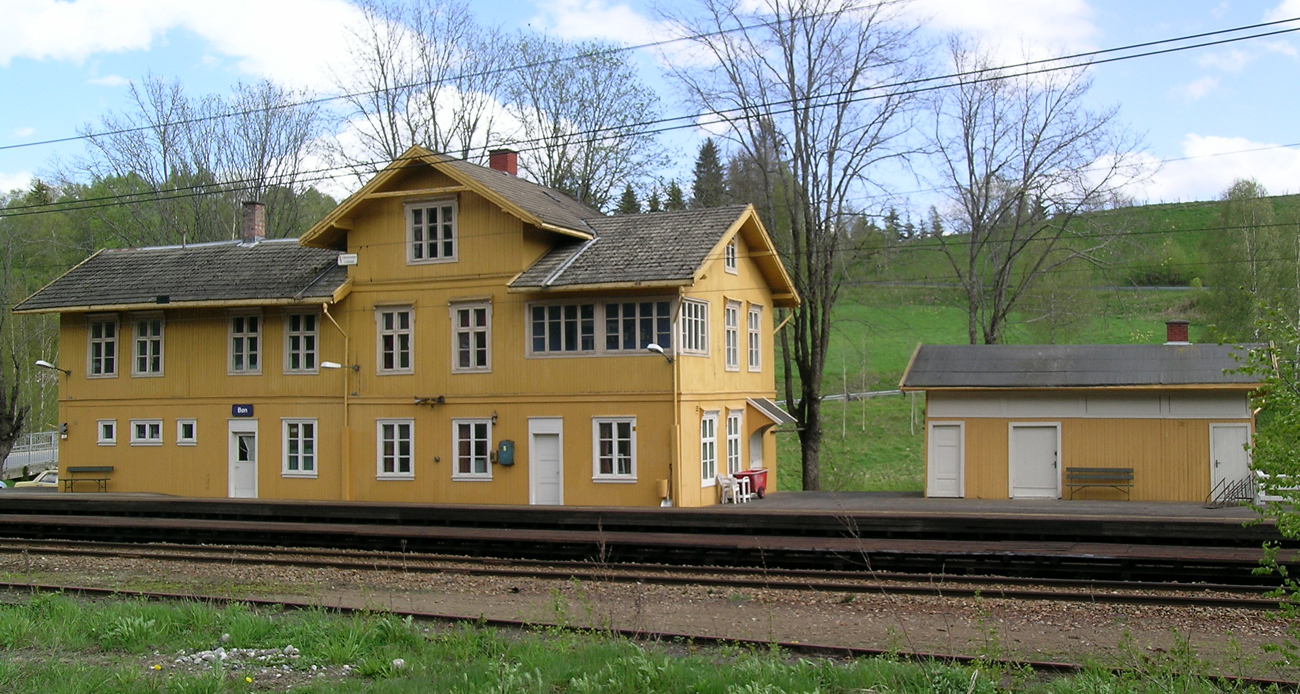
- Bøn Station

General information
- Elevation: 134 m (440 ft)
- Line: Trunk Line

History
- Opened: 1858
Location

Bøn Station lies on the Trunk Line (Norwegian: Hovedbanen) in Eidsvoll municipality, Norway, and was opened as a stop in 1858. The station lies 62.24 kilometres from Oslo S and is 134 metres above sea level. The station building was built in 1884.

The buildings at the station are important, with the station building (1874) and the goods house (1853) at Bøn the only original buildings remaining on the Trunk Line. In January 2009, the goods house at Bøn burnt down.

== Historical data ==
- 1884 Station built
- 1965 Became remote controlled
- 1989 No longer attended
- 2004 Preservation recommended by the Nasjonal verneplan for kulturminner i jernbanen del II
- 2004 13 June 2004 - Trains no longer stopped at Bøn Station. Local train, NSB route 440 (Drammen - Skøyen - Oslo S - Dal - Eidsvoll) now only runs to Dal Station.
- 2016 31 May 2016 - heat caused a derailment north of the station.
