= Nordic Institute of Art =

Art history organisation in Oslo

The Nordic Institute of Art was founded in Oslo in 2017 as an independent organization with the mission to stimulate research on art history from the Nordic region in an international context.

== History ==
The Nordic Institute of Art has co-organized exhibitions in close collaboration with museums and other institutions in the Nordics and internationally, as well as conferences and other academic events. The Norwegian art historian Knut Ljøgodt is the founding director of the Nordic Institute of Art.

== Museum collaborations ==
- Visionary Romantics. Balke, Lucas, Hertervig. Stavanger Art Museum, 29 September to 21 May 2023. Museo Lázaro Galdiano, Madrid, 29 September to 31 December 2023.
- Eva Bull Holte, Haugar Art Museum, Tønsberg, 22 May to 22 August 2022.
- Edward Burne-Jones. The Pre-Raphaelites and the North. Prins Eugens Waldemarsudde, Stockholm, 14 September 2019 to 26 January 2020; KODE Kunstmuseer og komponisthjem, Bergen, 21 February 2020 to 31 May 2020.
