= Østbye =

Østbye is a surname. Notable people with the surname include:

- Adolf Østbye (1868–1907), Norwegian revue artist and barber
- Gudbrand Østbye (1885–1972), Norwegian army officer and historian
- Peter Østbye (1855–1943), Norwegian philologist and academic administrator
- Rolf Østbye (1898–1979), Norwegian businessman
- Sverre Østbye (1889–1984), Norwegian Nordic skier
