= Jessheim =

Town in Viken, Norway

- Town
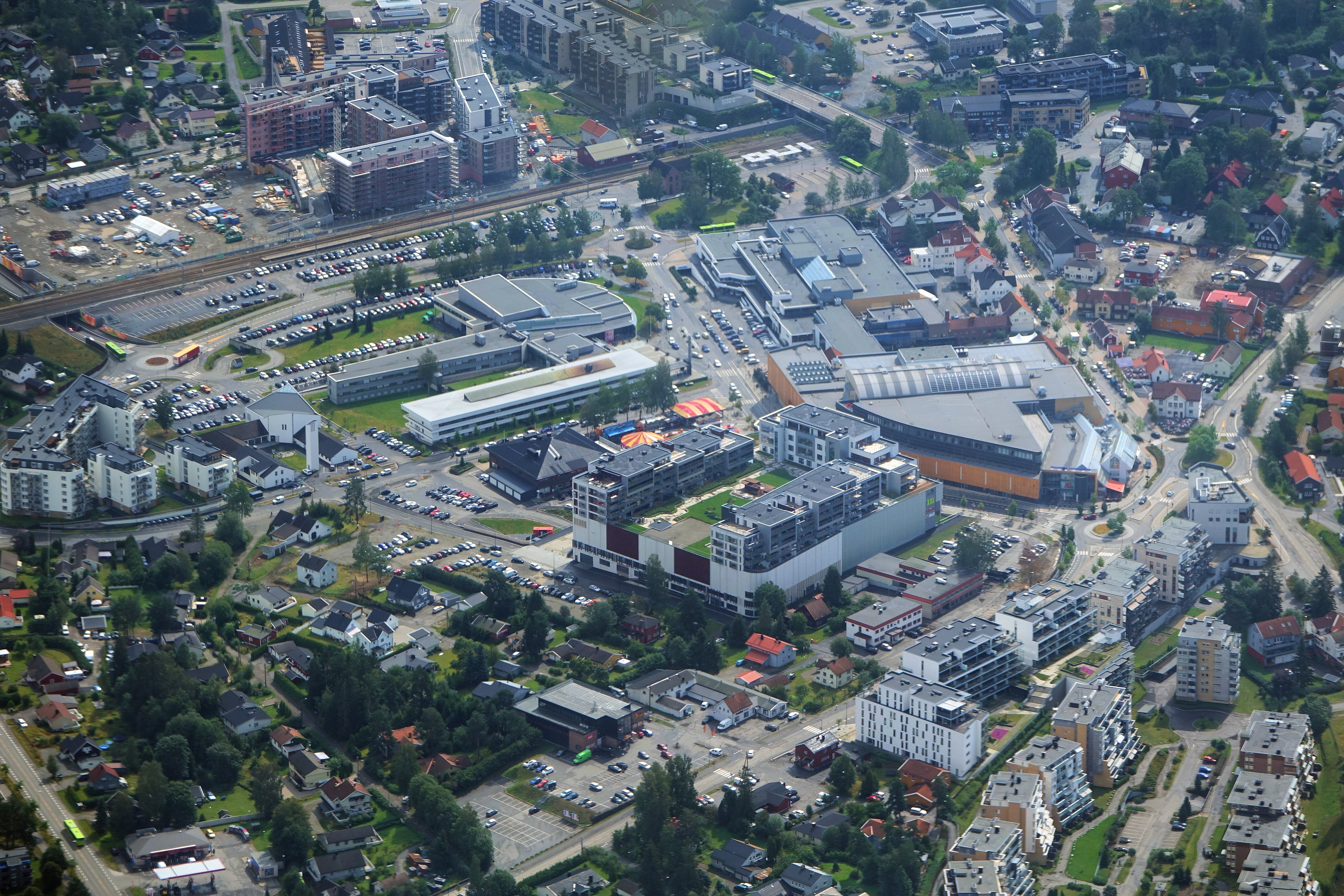
- Nickname: Flyplassbyen ("The Airport Town")
- Location within Norway
- Coordinates: 60°9′N 11°11′E
- Country: Norway
- County: Akershus
- District: Romerike
- Municipality: Ullensaker

Area
  - Total: 7.52 km^{2} (2.90 sq mi)

Population (2017)
  - Total: 21 598
- Time zone: UTC+1 (CET)
  - Summer (DST): UTC+2 (CEST)
- Postal code: 2053

Jessheim is a town in the Ullensaker municipality in Akershus of Norway.

== History ==
The railway station with the Jessheim station was built in 1854 as part of the Hovedbanen line from Oslo to Eidsvoll. The railroad had at the initial construction of the railroad in 1854 called the stop "Trøgstad", but because of confusion with the town name Trøgstad in Østfold, the name was changed in 1897 to "Jessum". This name was used blasphemically, for example by military recruits who said they had passed through Bøn (town north of Jessheim) which sounds like "prayer" in Norwegian to Jessum, which could sound like Jesus. The priests in the area complained to the bishop who in 1900 brought the case up with the local council and suggested the form "Jessheim". The name was changed to "Jesseim". In 1920 the railroad changed the spelling to the current form, Jessheim.

== Facilities and landmarks ==
Jessheim is a center for commerce and regional service functions at Øvre Romerike. The area also has some industry such as a concrete factory that utilizes the sand and gravel resources in the area as well as a wood products manufacturer. Jessheim Storsenter (mall) located in the center of town, is one of the biggest shopping malls in Norway.

Jessheim is also home to Ullensaker Kulturhus which is a cultural center with a library and cinema. West of the town is the old royal burial mound Raknehaugen which dates back to between AD 533 and 551.

== Etymology ==
The name "Jessheim" is from Norse Jasseimr or Jesseímr where the first part has unknown origin, while the second part (heimr) means home. It is also possible that the first part "Jess" can mean jarl or jarls (earls). The name was originally used for the Hovin parish.

== Population ==
As at January 2020, Jessheim's population was estimated to be 21,598.

== Transport ==
Jessheim Station (Jessheim stasjon) is located on the main track of Norway's first railroad, completed in 1854, and formed the foundation for the later town. From Jessheim trains go north to Dal and south to Oslo. The E6 highway runs past on the west side of the town. Distance to Oslo is 41 kilometres (25 mi) along this road, distance along the railroad is 45 kilometres (28 mi). Jessheim is also an important crossroad between Riksvei 35 westward to Oslo Airport, Gardermoen and Hønefoss, Riksvei 174 to Nannestad and Hurdal, and eastward to Kongsvinger (Riksvei 2).

== Sports ==
As of 2016 the local football (soccer) team Ullensaker/Kisa plays in the professional Norwegian First Division.

== Notable locals ==
- Martin Julius Halvorsen (born 1867), founded the Akershusingen, later Romerikes Blad, in 1902. Typographer and book printer. Best known as M. Jul. Halvorsen
- Diaz (born 1976), artist and rap artist
- Ole Kristian Furuseth (born 1967), slalom racer.
- Anniken Huitfeldt (born 1969), Politician
- Tanja Hansen (born 1973), former porn star
- Egil Nyhus (born 1962), illustrator
- Solveig Kloppen (born 1971), Actress and TV hostess. Most known as the hostess of Norwegian Idol.
- Memnock, artist and black metal musician (Susperia)
- Dimmu Borgir, symphonic black metal band formed in 1993.
- Alexandra Rotan, singer, songwriter, member of the Europop band Keiino, participated in the Eurovision Song Contest 2019
- Malin Brenn (born 1999), football player
- Sebastian Sponevik (born 2005), artistic national team gymnast.

== See also ==
- Category:People from Jessheim

== Gallery ==
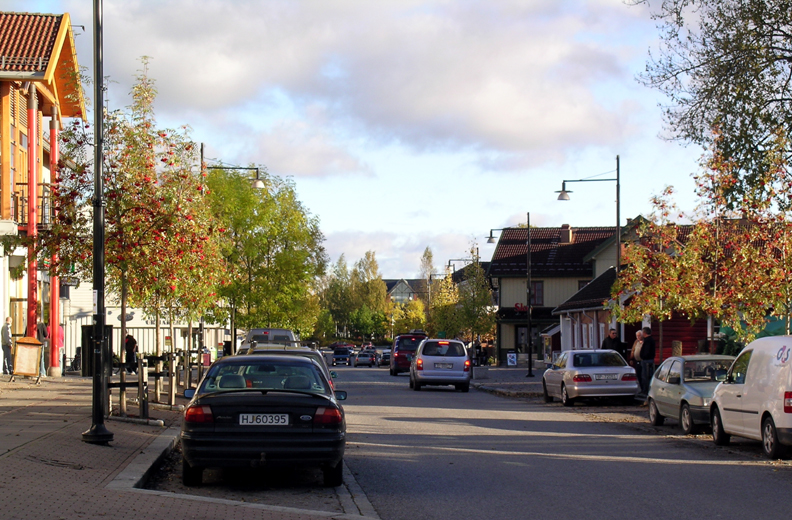
The main street "Storgata" at Jessheim in Ullensaker.

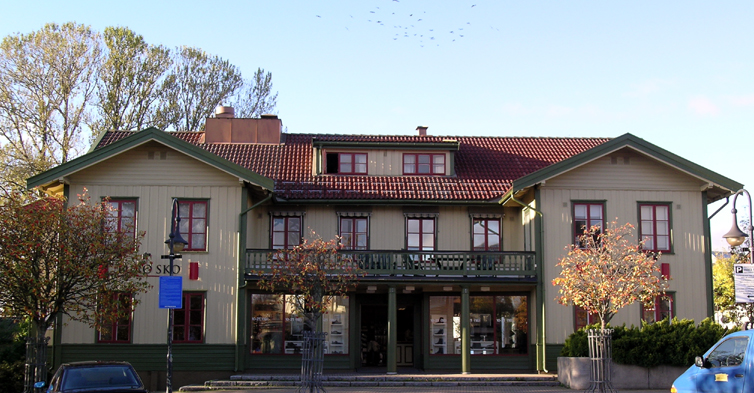
Storgata 7 on the main street of Jessheim.

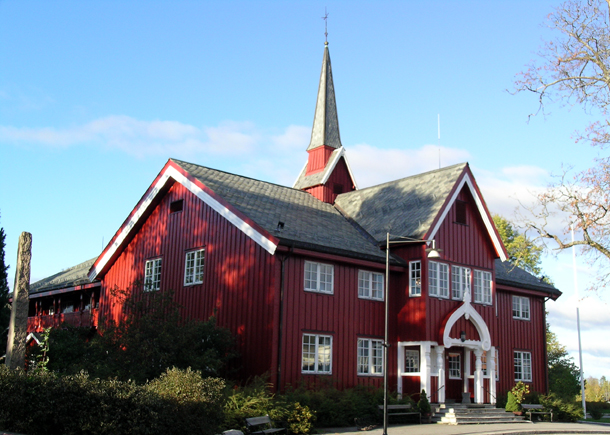
Herredshuset was completed in 1901 and housed Ullensaker county administration until 1967.

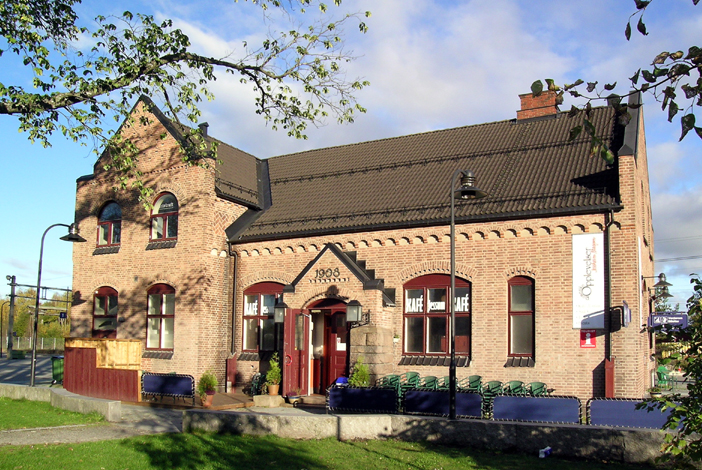
Jessheim railway station was originally built in 1854.

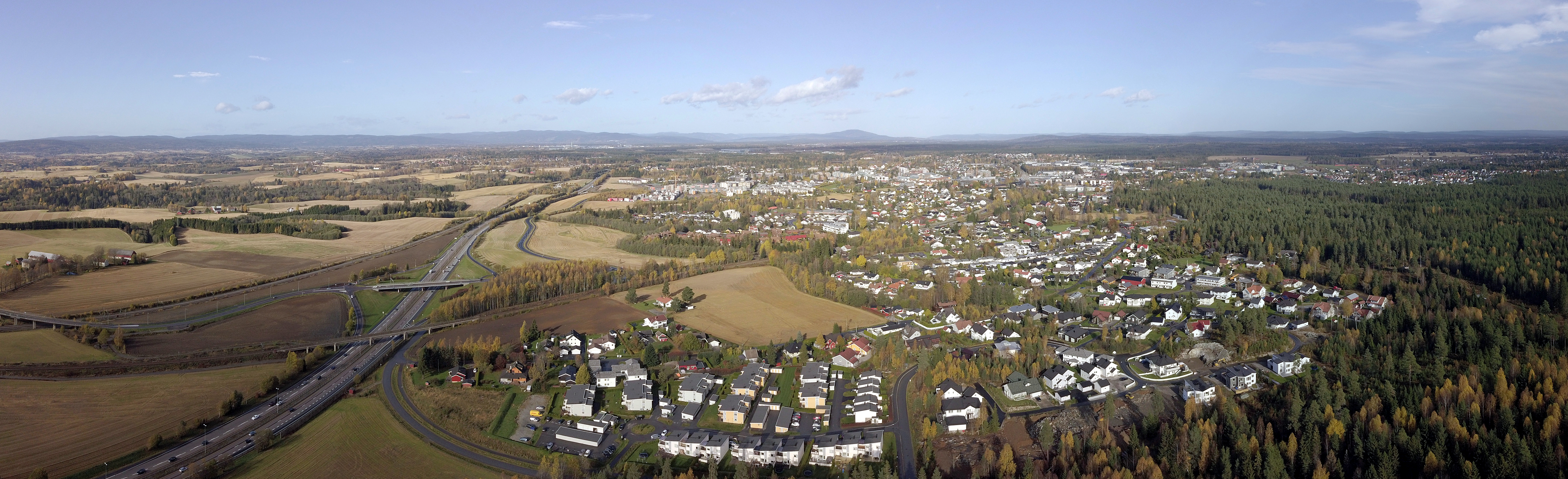
Jessheim city seen from the south, with the European route E6 running on the west side of the city.
