= Lindeberg, Akershus =

- Village
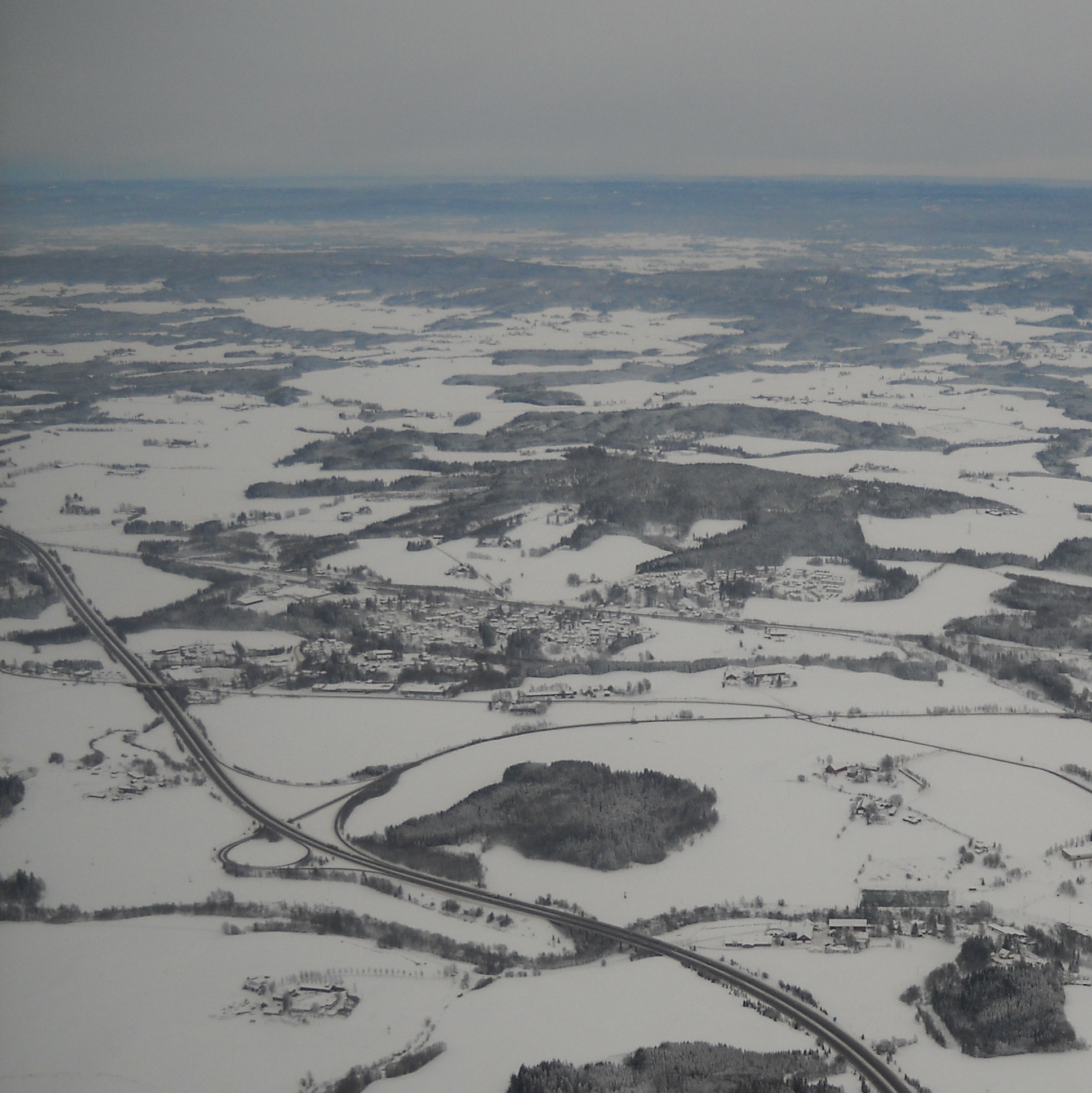

- Location in Akershus
- Coordinates: 60.0347°N 11.1269°E
- Country: Norway
- Region: Østlandet
- County: Akershus
- Municipality: Lillestrøm
- Time zone: UTC+01:00 (CET)
  - Summer (DST): UTC+02:00 (CEST)

Lindeberg is a village that is located in the Lillestrøm municipality, Norway. Its population was 926 as of 2009.
