= Dal, Norway =

Dal
- Village
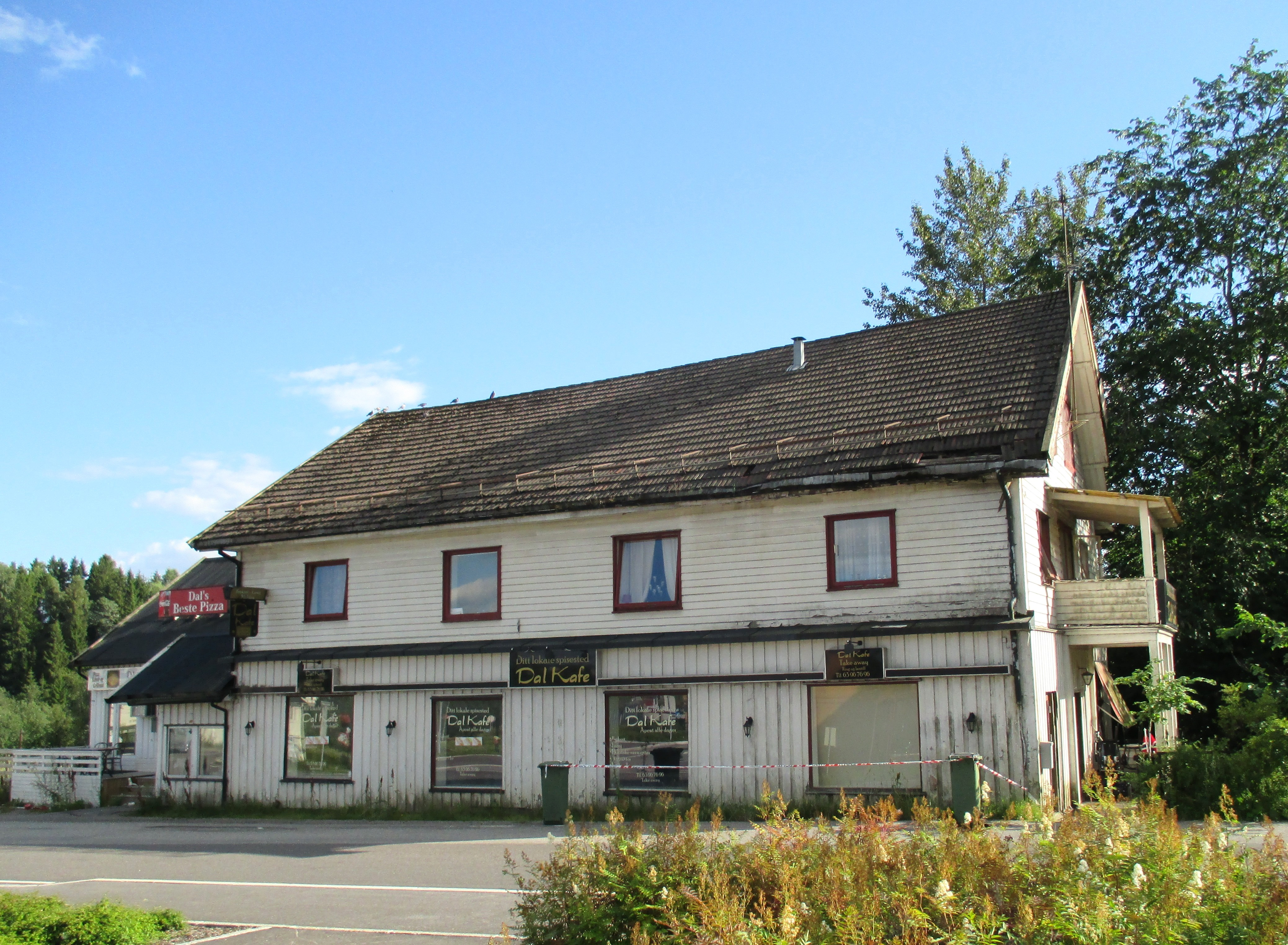
- Dal café, next to the station

- Location in Akershus
- Coordinates: 60°15′0″N 11°12′0″E
- Country: Norway
- Region: Østlandet
- County: Akershus
- Municipality: Eidsvoll
- Time zone: UTC+01:00 (CET)
  - Summer (DST): UTC+02:00 (CEST)

Dal is a village in Eidsvoll, Akershus, Norway. The village has a railway station, Dal Station, served by the Oslo Commuter Rail.
