= Daniel Nordby =

American lawyer (born 1978)

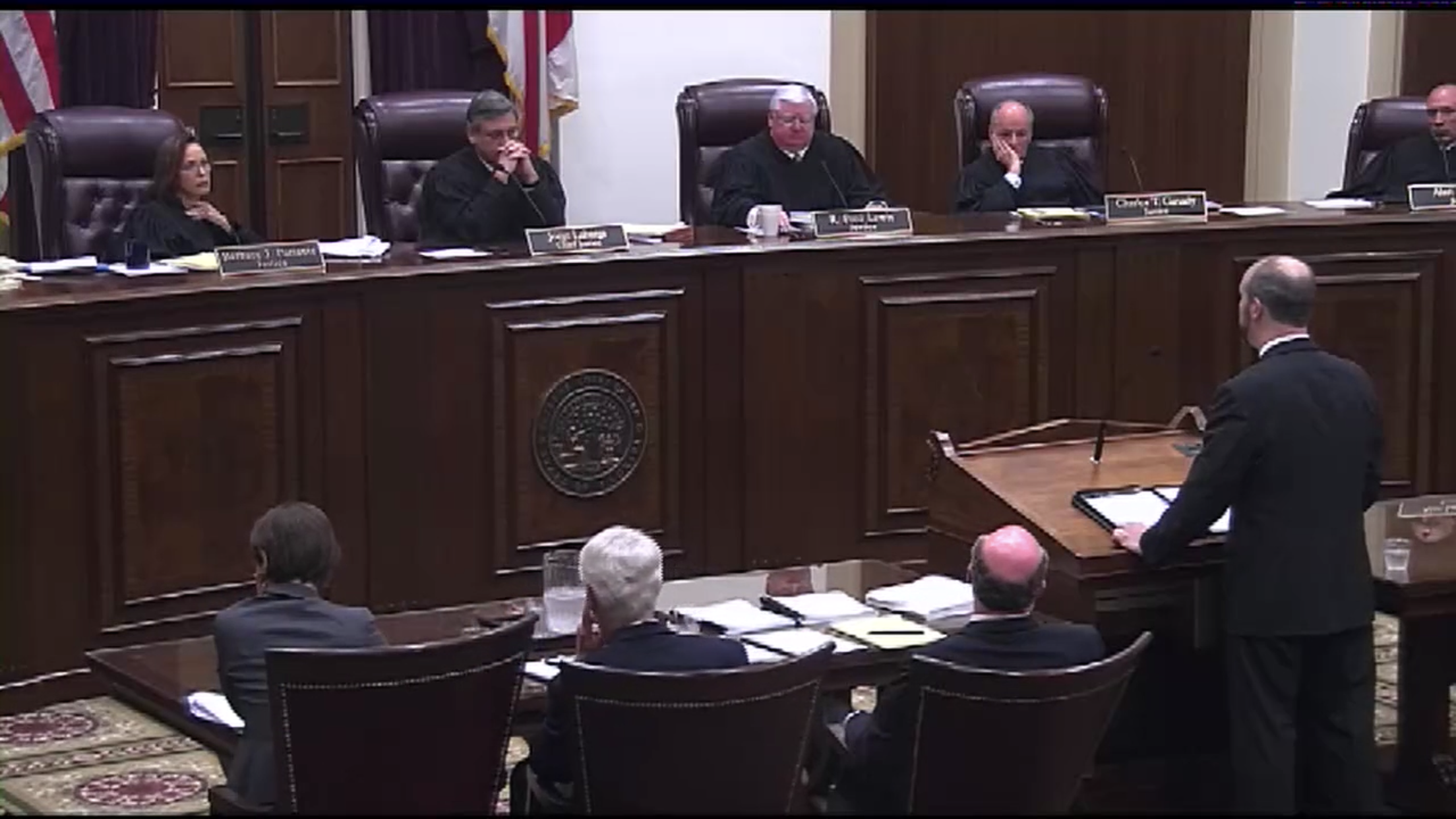
Daniel Nordby arguing before the Florida Supreme Court on behalf of Governor Rick Scott.

Daniel E. Nordby (born August 1, 1978) was General Counsel to Florida Governor Rick Scott. He served as the chief legal advisor to the Governor and chief advisor on Florida judicial appointments. He is a partner in the Tallahassee office of the law firm of Shutts & Bowen LLP where he handles civil and administrative litigation and appeals.

== Early life and family ==
Nordby was raised in Tallahassee, Florida and attended the University of Florida where he graduated with dual bachelor's degrees and a Juris Doctor degree. He became an attorney and Florida Bar member in 2005. Nordby is married to Florida Deputy Solicitor General Rachel Nordby.

== Legal career ==
Nordby practiced in the areas of trial, appellate and administrative litigation as a partner with Shutts & Bowen LLP. He previously served as General Counsel to the Republican Party of Florida, and currently serves as General Counsel to the Governor of Florida.

== Public service ==
=== Judicial Nominating Commission ===
On December 21, 2012, Florida Governor Rick Scott appointed Nordby to the Judicial Nominating Commission for the Florida Supreme Court. Nordby was reappointed to a second four-year term in 2016. While serving on the Supreme Court Judicial Nominating Commission, Nordby participated in the nominations that led to appointment of Justice C. Alan Lawson.

=== General Counsel to the Florida Secretary of State ===
Daniel Nordby served as General Counsel to the Florida Secretary of State from 2011 to 2012.

=== General Counsel to the Florida House of Representatives ===
House Speaker Will Weatherford appointed Daniel Nordby to serve as General Counsel to the Florida House of Representatives from 2012 to 2014.

=== General Counsel to the Governor ===
Nordby was appointed General Counsel to the Governor of Florida in 2017. As General Counsel he is the chief advisor to the Governor on all legal matters and serves as the Governor’s Chief Ethics Officer and chief advisor on judicial appointments. On November 1, 2017 Nordby represented Governor Rick Scott before the Florida Supreme Court in a landmark case challenging Governor Scott’s authority to appoint three new Supreme Court Justices in January 2019. Nordby prevailed in the case with a 6-1 decision in favor of Governor Scott that dismissed the case.
