= Martin Julius Halvorsen =

Norwegian politician

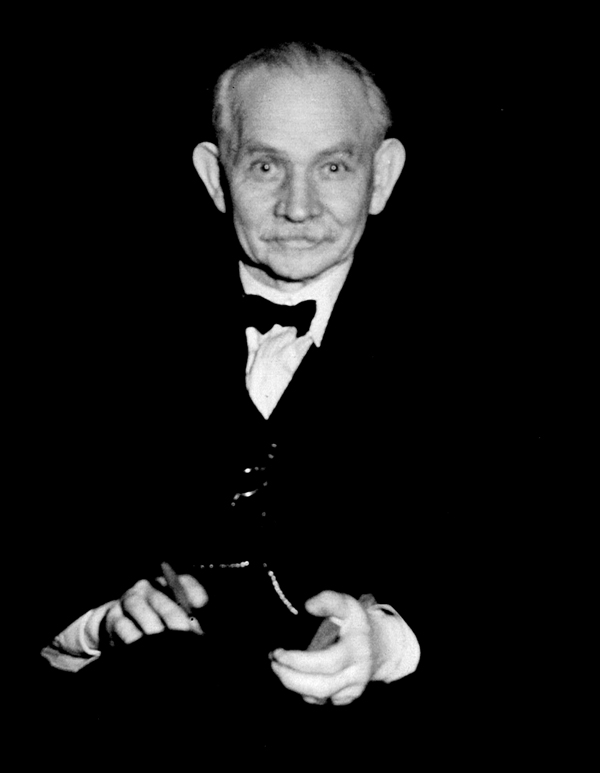
M. Jul. Halvorsen

Martin Julius Halvorsen (4 November 1867 – 7 March 1951) was a Norwegian newspaper editor and politician for the Labour and Social Democratic Labour parties.

Born in Kristiania, he took an education as a book printer. Having founded his own printing press in 1897, he moved it from Kristiania to rural Jessheim in 1902. Here, he founded the newspaper Akershusingen, renamed to Romerikes Blad in 1904. He was the editor-in-chief of this newspaper for some time. The newspaper still exists, and has a circulation of about 38,000. Halvorsen also edited Akershus Social-Demokrat from 1916 to 1917.

While living in Kristiania, he was a member of the city council from 1896 to 1901. He was then a member of Ullensaker municipal council from 1904 to 1937, serving as deputy mayor from 1916 to 1919 and mayor from 1934 to 1937. Halvorsen also served one term, from 1913 to 1915, in the Parliament of Norway, representing the rural constituency of Mellem Romerike, and finally, was a deputy for Harald Halvorsen.

He was a member of the board of the Labour Party chapter in Akershus from 1905. From 1908 to 1912 he was chairman of the county chapter. Between 1921 and 1927, when the Labour Party suffered a split, Halvorsen was a member of the Social Democratic Labour Party. However, as the Labour Party and the Social Democratic Labour Party reconciled in 1927, he rejoined Labour and sat on the county board for a second period, from 1927 to 1937.
