= Station Group Gardermoen =

- IATA: OSL; ICAO: ENGM

Summary
- Airport type: Joint (Civil and Military)
- Operator: Royal Norwegian Air Force
- Location: Ullensaker
- Elevation AMSL: 208 m / 681 ft
- Coordinates: 60°11′38″N 11°06′02″E

Map
- Location in Norway

Runways
Direction	Length		Surface
Direction	m	ft	Surface
01L/19R	3,600	11,811	Asphalt
01R/19L	2,950	9,678	Asphalt

Station Group Gardermoen (IATA: OSL, ICAO: ENGM) (Norwegian: Gardermoen flystasjon) is located about 50 km north of Oslo, Norway. It is colocated with Norway's main airport, Oslo Airport, Gardermoen.

335 Squadron and 717 Squadron of the Royal Norwegian Air Force are stationed at Gardermoen, which operates respectively C-130J-30 Super Hercules transport aircraft and Dassault Falcon 20 electronic warfare aircraft.

== History ==
The Norwegian Army started using Gardermoen as a camp already in 1740, when it was called Fredericksfeldt. The first flight took place in 1912, and by 1920 there were multiple hangars at the airport.

During the German invasion of Norway in World War II the Germans bombed the airport, but built it up with two 2000-meter runways during the war.

The military airport was founded on December 1, 1996, with new installations for 1,2 billion NOK. The airfield is built to easily expand cheaply and fast whenever needed. On October 8, 1998 the main airport serving Oslo was moved from Fornebu to Gardermoen. The new airport had among other facilities two runways.

The Air Force was considering moving its operations at Gardermoen to Rygge Air Station by consent of the Chief of Defence of Norway, General Sigurd Frisvold in the 2003-2004 period; however, this proposition was turned down by the Norwegian Parliament's Defence Committee. Thus, the air station currently remains operational.
