= Dal Station =

Railway station in Eidsvoll, Norway

Dal
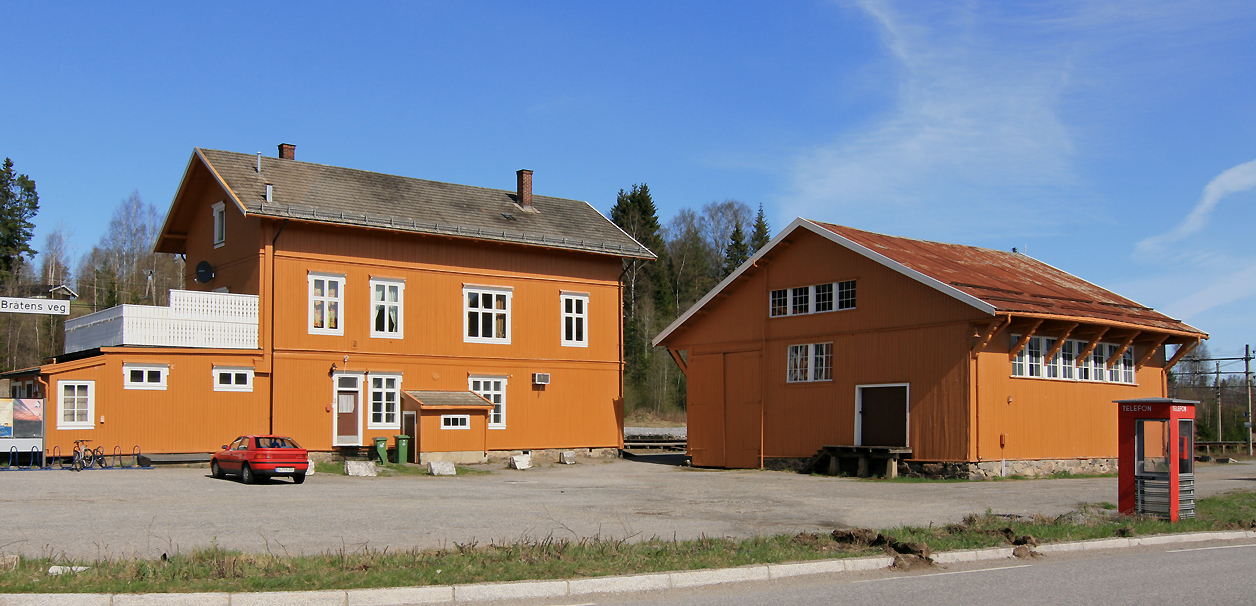

General information
- Location: Dal, Eidsvoll; Norway
- Coordinates: 60°14′56″N 11°12′10″E
- Elevation: 164 m (538 ft)
- Owner: Bane NOR
- Operator: Vy
- Line: Trunk Line
- Distance: 57.20 km
- Connections: Bus service

History
- Opened: 1854
Location
- Location within Akershus

Dal is a railway station located in Dal in Eidsvoll, Norway. The station is located upon the Trunk Line and was opened in 1854. The station is served by commuter trains with hourly services to Oslo Central Station and Drammen Station, a service which Dal functions as the terminal station for.

Preceding station			Following station
Hauerseter	Trunk Line		Eidsvoll
Preceding station	Local trains		Following station
Hauerseter	R13	Drammen–Oslo S–Dal	—
