= Ullensaker =

Ullensaker Municipality Ullensaker kommune
- Municipality
- Ullensaker
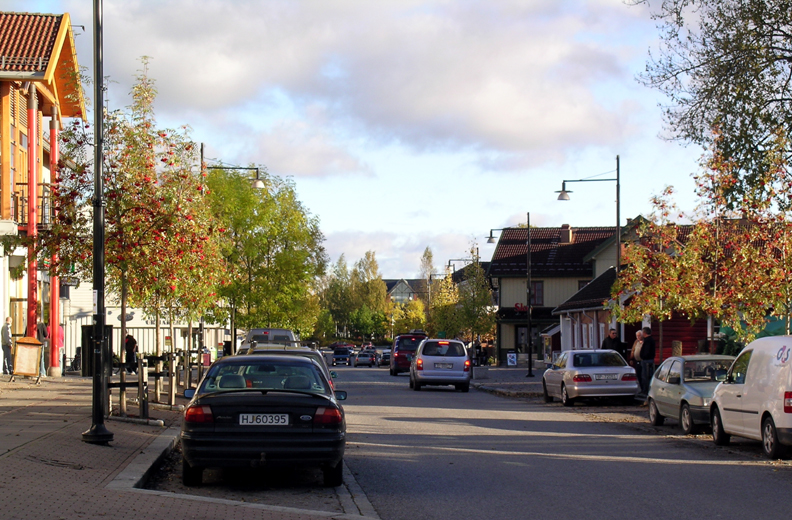

- Coat of arms

- Akershus within Norway

- Ullensaker within Akershus
- Coordinates: 60°10′15″N 11°11′17″E
- Country: Norway
- County: Akershus
- District: Romerike
- Administrative centre: Jessheim

Government
  - Mayor (2023): Ståle Lien Hansen (FrP)

Area
  - Total: 252 km^{2} (97 sq mi)
  - Land: 250 km^{2} (97 sq mi)
  - Rank: #301 in Norway

Population (2023)
  - Total: 43,814
  - Rank: #25 in Norway
  - Density: 173/km^{2} (450/sq mi)
  - Change (10 years): ▲ +34.5%
- Demonym: Ullsokning

Official language
  - Norwegian form: Bokmål
- Time zone: UTC+01:00 (CET)
  - Summer (DST): UTC+02:00 (CEST)
- ISO 3166 code: NO-3209
- Income (per capita): 1NOK kr (2022)
- Website: Official website

Ullensaker is a municipality in Akershus county, Norway. It is part of the traditional region of Romerike. The administrative centre of the municipality is the city of Jessheim. It has a population of 40,459 inhabitants. Norway's largest international airport Oslo Airport, Gardermoen, is located in Ullensaker.

== Name ==
The municipality (originally the parish) is named after the old Ullensaker farm. The name is first recorded in 1300 as Ullinshof. The first element is the genitive case of the name Ullinn (a sideform of Ullr). The last element was originally hof which means "temple", but this was later (around 1500 AD) changed to aker meaning "acre" or "field".

== Coat-of-arms ==
Ullensaker does not have an heraldic coat-of-arms properly granted. The municipality uses a non-heraldic badge that is from modern times. The logo was adopted on 8 November 1979, and it shows the god Ullr of Norse mythology holding a bow and three arrows. The colors on the logo can vary.

== Geography ==
Ullensaker borders with Eidsvoll to the north, Nes to the east, Sørum to the south, and Gjerdrum and Nannestad to the west. The international airport that serves as the main airport of Norway, Oslo Airport, Gardermoen, is located in Ullensaker. The municipality has two major population centres: the village of Kløfta and the city of Jessheim, the latter one houses the administration center of Ullensaker. There is also a Royal Norwegian Army base at Sessvollmoen as well as a Royal Norwegian Air Force air station, Gardermoen Air Station.

== Climate ==
Climate data for Gardermoen 1991–2020 (202 m)
Month	Jan	Feb	Mar	Apr	May	Jun	Jul	Aug	Sep	Oct	Nov	Dec	Year
Mean daily maximum °C (°F)	−1.6 (29.1)	−0.8 (30.6)	3.9 (39.0)	9.6 (49.3)	15.5 (59.9)	19.3 (66.7)	21.5 (70.7)	20.3 (68.5)	15.3 (59.5)	8.3 (46.9)	2.9 (37.2)	−0.7 (30.7)	9.5 (49.0)
Daily mean °C (°F)	−4.4 (24.1)	−4.1 (24.6)	−0.5 (31.1)	4.6 (40.3)	10.1 (50.2)	14.1 (57.4)	16.5 (61.7)	15.1 (59.2)	10.6 (51.1)	5 (41)	0.5 (32.9)	−3.4 (25.9)	5.3 (41.6)
Mean daily minimum °C (°F)	−7.3 (18.9)	−7.6 (18.3)	−4.3 (24.3)	0.1 (32.2)	4.8 (40.6)	9.2 (48.6)	11.7 (53.1)	10.7 (51.3)	6.8 (44.2)	2.1 (35.8)	−1.9 (28.6)	−6.3 (20.7)	1.5 (34.7)
Average precipitation mm (inches)	65.2 (2.57)	46.7 (1.84)	45.5 (1.79)	49.8 (1.96)	67.3 (2.65)	78.4 (3.09)	80.9 (3.19)	101.4 (3.99)	80.5 (3.17)	94.4 (3.72)	89.5 (3.52)	67 (2.6)	866.6 (34.09)
Average precipitation days (≥ 1.0 mm)	12	8	7	8	10	10	10	11	9	11	12	11	119
Source: National Oceanic and Atmospheric Administration

== Society ==
Ullensaker has had a huge population increase over the past fifty years. This increase has been slightly accelerating over the past few years. From 2000 to 2007, the population of Ullensaker increased by almost 6,000 people. The recent increase is partly attributed to the founding of Oslo Airport, Gardermoen.

== History ==
Raknehaugen, the largest burial mound in the Nordic countries, has been carbon dated to around 550; the age of the mound is disputed.

Historical population
Year	Pop.	±%
1951	9,195	—
1961	11,611	+26.3%
1971	15,800	+36.1%
1981	16,906	+7.0%
1991	18,116	+7.2%
2001	20,987	+15.8%
2011	30,081	+43.3%
2021	40,459	+34.5%
2031?	49,447	+22.2%
Source: Statistics Norway.

== Demographics ==
People who are immigrants, or have parents that are immigrants, constitute 37% of the population, as of the beginning of 2025.

Earlier (2021), 1,390 inhabitants had Polish parents and/or were Polish (themselves); 1,048 had Pakistani parents and/or were Pakistani.

Ancestry	Number
Poland	1390
Pakistan	1048
Lithuania	771
Afghanistan	641
Iraq	688
Sweden	578
Sri Lanka	452
Vietnam	378
Kosovo	327
Philippines	315
Bosnia-Herzegovina	266
Thailand	243

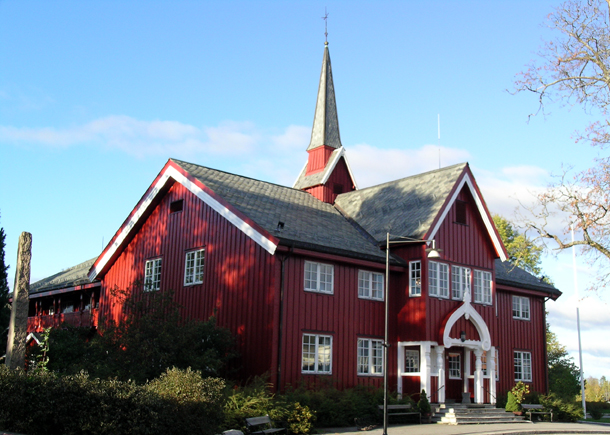
Herredshuset was completed in 1901 and housed Ullensaker county administration until 1967.

== Attractions ==
- Raknehaugen - the largest tumulus of Northern Europe
- Trandumskogen - A memorial honoring 173 Norwegians, 15 Soviet citizens and 6 Britons that were executed by the nazis during World War II.
- Gardermoen Culture Park - An area close to Gardermoen Airport, which serves as the Norwegian Air Force's airplane collection and the Scandinavian Airlines Museum's location.

== Notable people ==
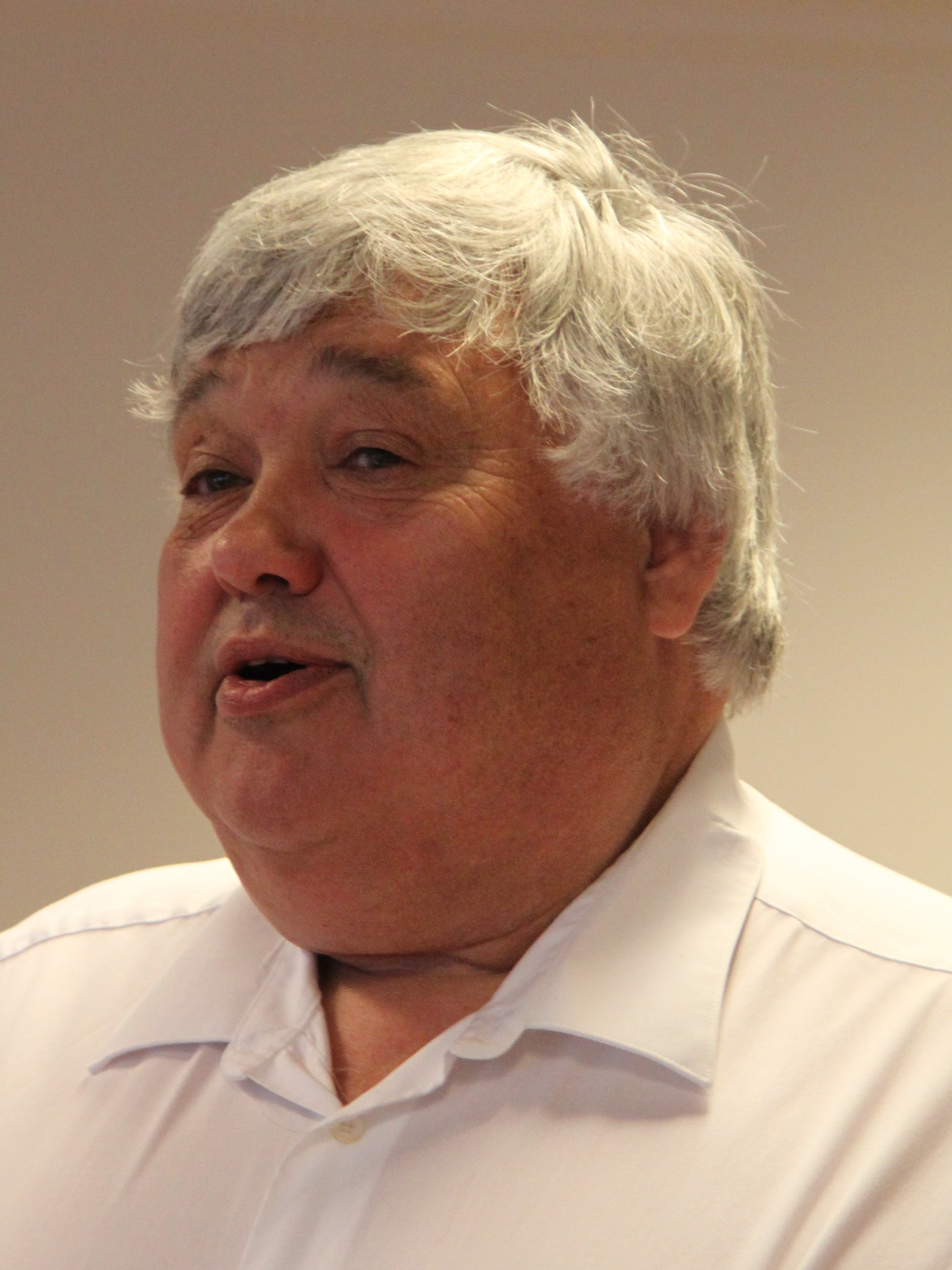
Harald Espelund, 2010

- Niels Laache (1831 in Ullensaker – 1892) a Norwegian revivalist, writer, and bishop
- Kristian Laake (1875 in Ullensaker - 1950) Former Commanding General of Norway
- Gudmund Sundby (1878 in Ullensaker – 1973) a hydroelectric engineer and academic
- Thor Gystad (born 1919 in Ullensaker - 2007) politician, Mayor of Ullensaker 1959 to 1969
- Harald Espelund (born 1948) organic farmer and Mayor of Ullensaker from 2003 to 2015
- Laila Brenden (born 1956) a Norwegian author, lives in Jessheim
- Knut Ljøgodt (born 1968 in Ullensaker) a Norwegian art historian
- Anniken Huitfeldt (born 1969) a historian and politician, grew up in Jessheim
- Tanya Hansen (born 1973 in Jessheim) a Norwegian pornographic actress
- Thomas Enger (born 1973) a writer and journalist, grew up in Jessheim
- Mani Hussaini (born 1987) a Kurdish-Norwegian politician, lived in Jessheim since 2001

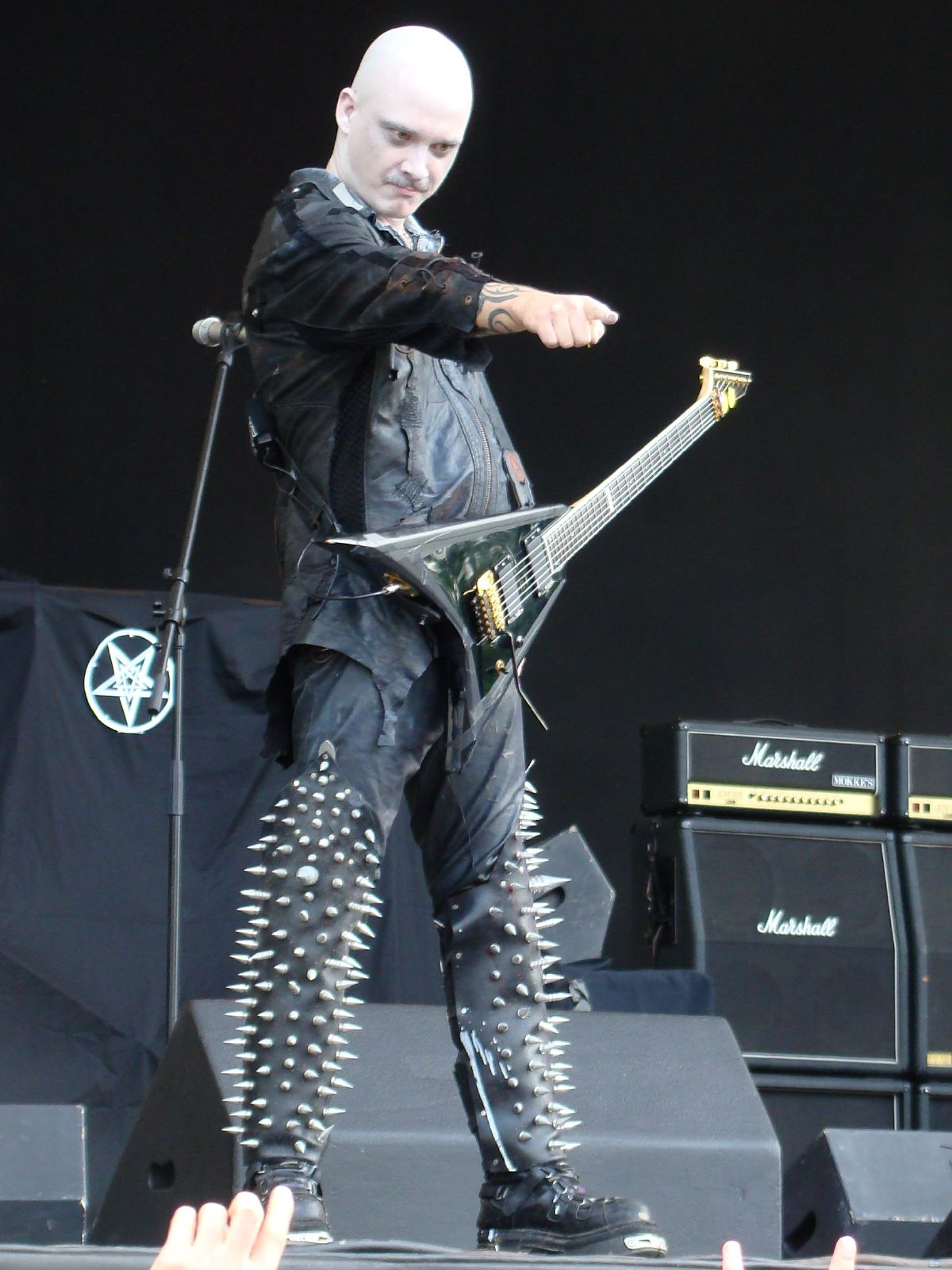
Galder with Dimmu Borgir, 2007

=== Musicians & Bands ===
- Johannes Hanssen (1874 in Ullensaker – 1967) a bandmaster, composer and teacher
- Stein Ove Berg (1948 in Kløfta – 2002) a Norwegian singer and songwriter
- Stian Tomt Thoresen (born 1976 in Jessheim) stage name Shagrath, vocalist and founder of Dimmu Borgir
- Ivar Tristan Lundsten (born 1976 in Jessheim) stage name Brynjard Tristan, bassist and songwriter
- Tom Rune Andersen (born 1976 in Jessheim) stage name Galder, a guitarist and vocalist
- Andres Rafael Diaz (born 1976 in Jessheim) stage name Diaz, rapper
- Antestor (formed 1990 in Jessheim) an unblack metal band
- Dimmu Borgir (formed 1993 in Jessheim) a symphonic black metal band

=== Sport ===
- Oscar Fonbæk (1887 in Ullensaker – 1965) long-distance runner, bronze and silver medallist at the 1908 Summer Olympics
- Ole Kristian Furuseth (born 1967) a retired Norwegian alpine skier, skied for Ullensaker SK
- brothers Thomas Roth (born 1991 in Sand) & Andreas Roth (born 1993 in Sand) Norwegian middle-distance runners

== Sister cities ==
The following cities are twinned with Ullensaker:

- - Borgarbyggð, Western Region, Iceland
- - Falkenberg, Halland County, Sweden
- - Leirvík, Eysturoy, Faroe Islands
- - Odsherred, Region Sjælland, Denmark
