= Trunk Line =

Norwegian railway line between Oslo and Eidsvoll

Coordinates: 60°01′07″N 11°06′03″E

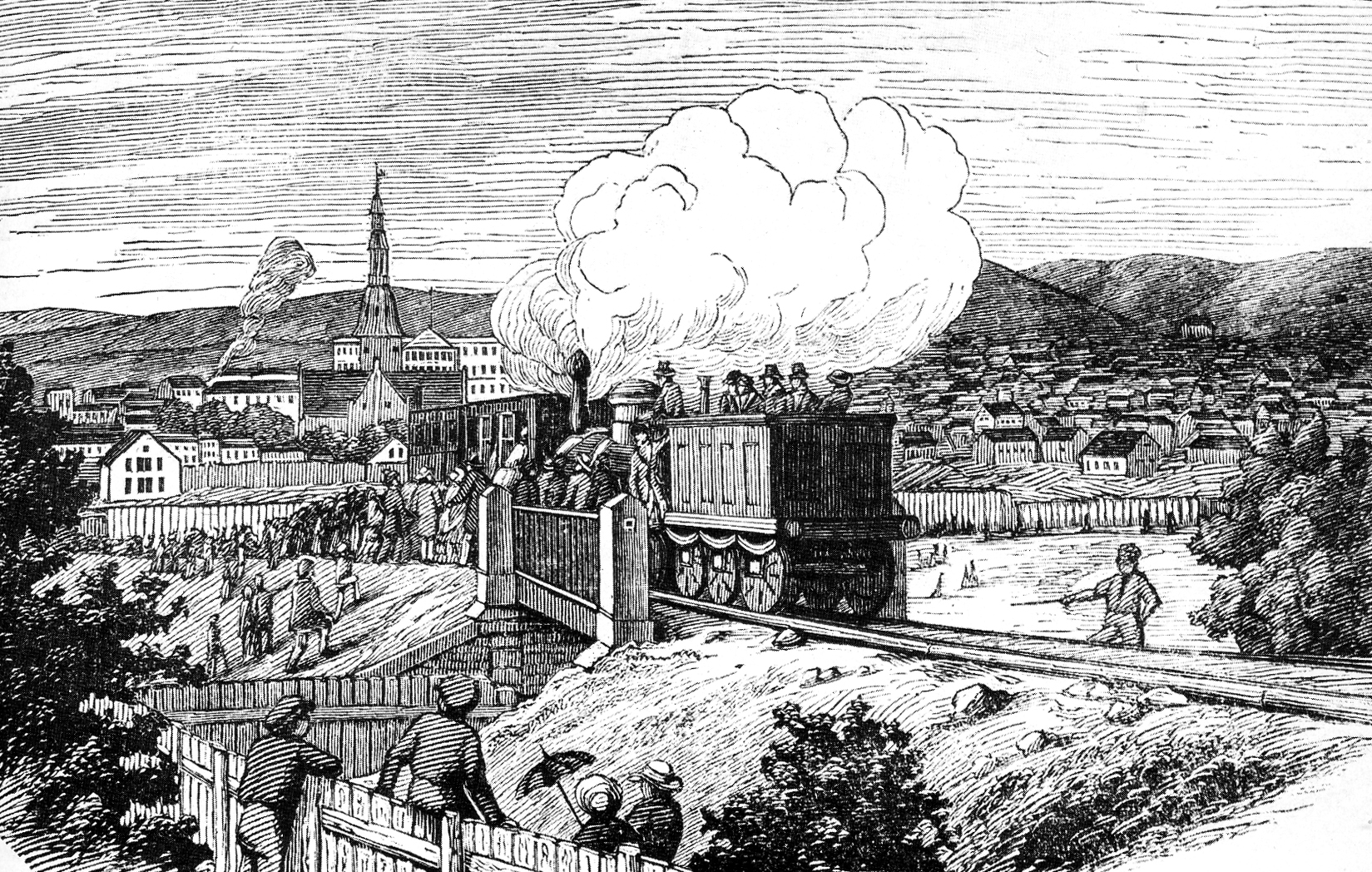
- Depiction of the first trial run of the rails, in 1853

Overview
- Native name: Hovedbanen
- Owner: Bane NOR
- Termini: Oslo S; Eidsvoll
- Stations: 19

Service
- Type: Railway
- Operator(s): Vy; CargoNet
- Rolling stock: Class 72 (L1); Class 75 (R13)

History
- Opened: 1854

Technical
- Line length: 68 km
- Track length: 112 km
- Number of tracks: 1–2
- Character: Local and freight trains
- Track gauge: 1,435 mm (4 ft 8 1/2 in)
- Electrification: 15 kV 16.7 Hz AC
- Operating speed: Max. 130 kilometres per hour (81 mph)

The Trunk Line (Norwegian: Hovedbanen) is a railway line in Norway which runs between Oslo and Eidsvoll. The line is owned by Bane NOR.

== History ==
Built by Robert Stephenson, the Trunk Line was opened on 1 September 1854 by the Norwegian Trunk Railway (Norwegian: Norsk Hoved-Jernbane), making it the oldest public railway line in Norway. It connected to steamboats on Lake Mjøsa, allowing steam powered transport to places like Lillehammer, 180 kilometers (110 mi) from Oslo. The name comes from the fact that during the planning, it was the only railway project in Norway considered economically viable, since steamboats were considered cheaper if they could be used. The railway was successful and more railways started to be considered.

The section between Kristiania East and Lillestrøm was rebuilt to double track in 1902, and the line was electrified in two portions, in 1927 and 1953. The Trunk Line was the main line between Oslo and Eidsvoll until 8 October 1998, when the more direct, double-tracked high-speed Gardermoen Line opened, taking most of the passenger traffic.

Today the old line between Oslo and Lillestrøm is used for freight traffic and for commuter trains serving the suburban stations in outer Oslo, Lørenskog and Skedsmo. The Gardermoen Line handles high-speed passenger trains and freight trains laden with jet fuel for Oslo Airport, Gardermoen. In addition overcrowded trains are not allowed through the Romerike Tunnel, and are occasionally diverted to the old line.

Passenger service on the old line past Jessheim is only provided to Dal.

== Stations ==
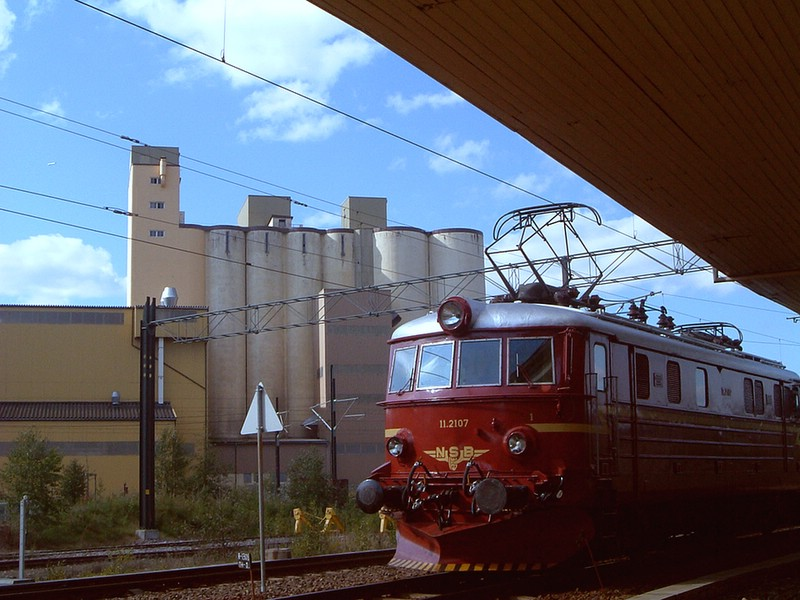
Eidsvoll Station

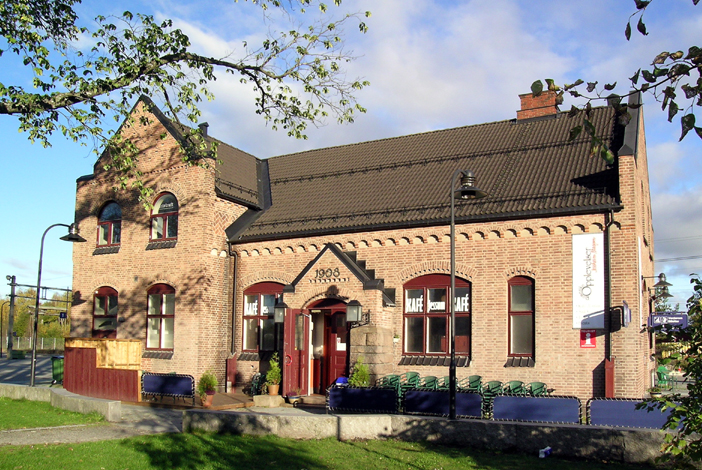
Jessheim Station

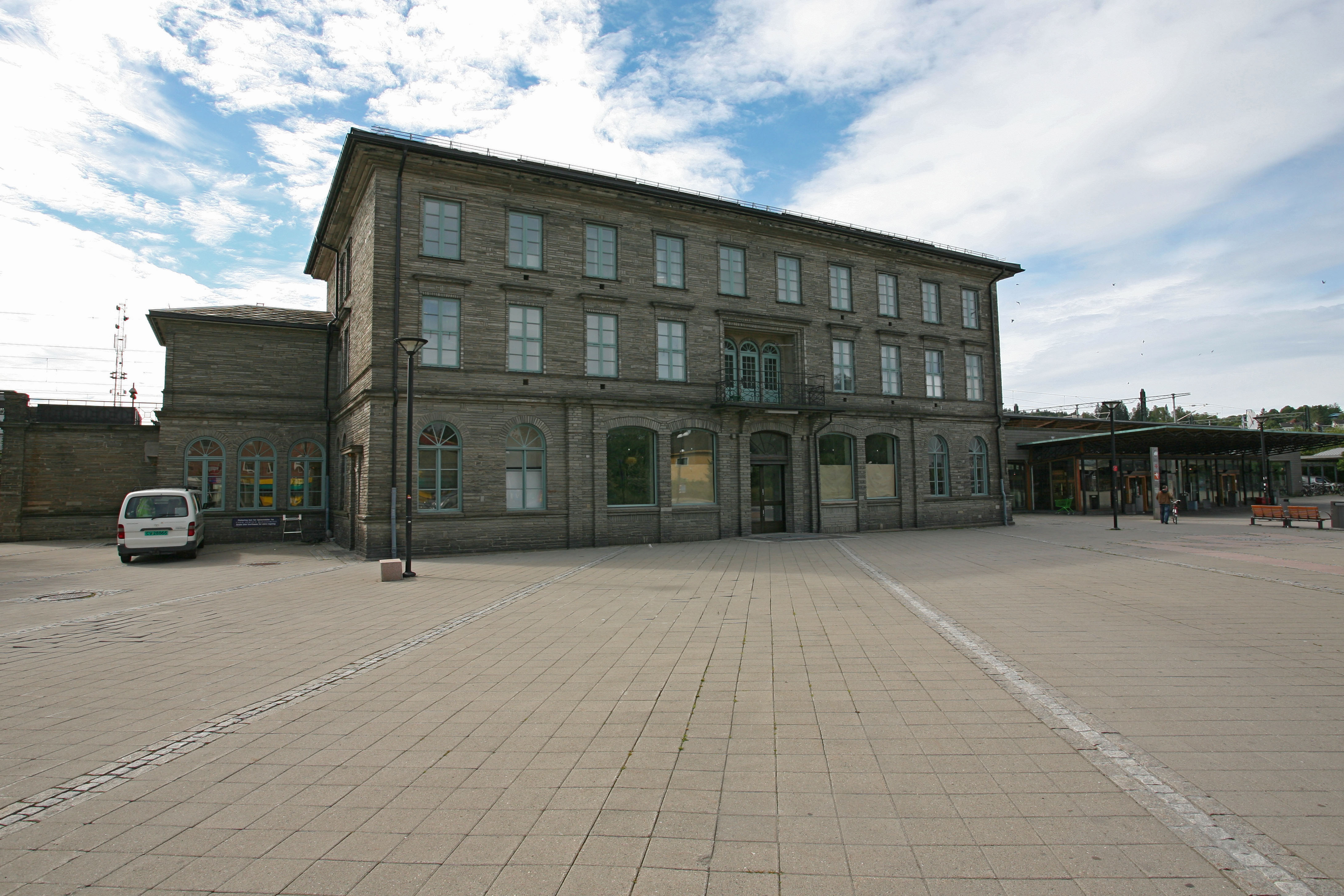
Lillestrøm Station

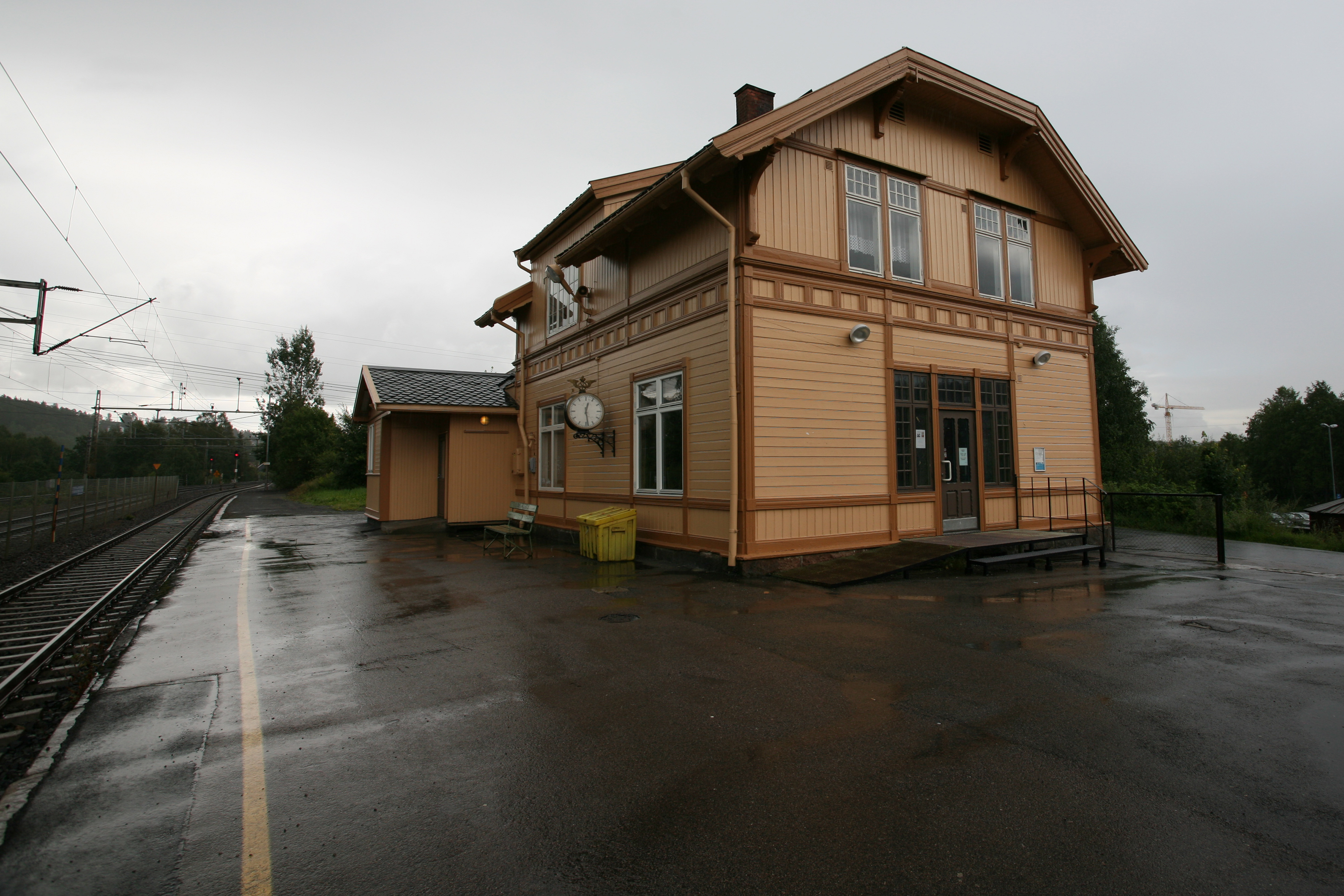
Lørenskog Station

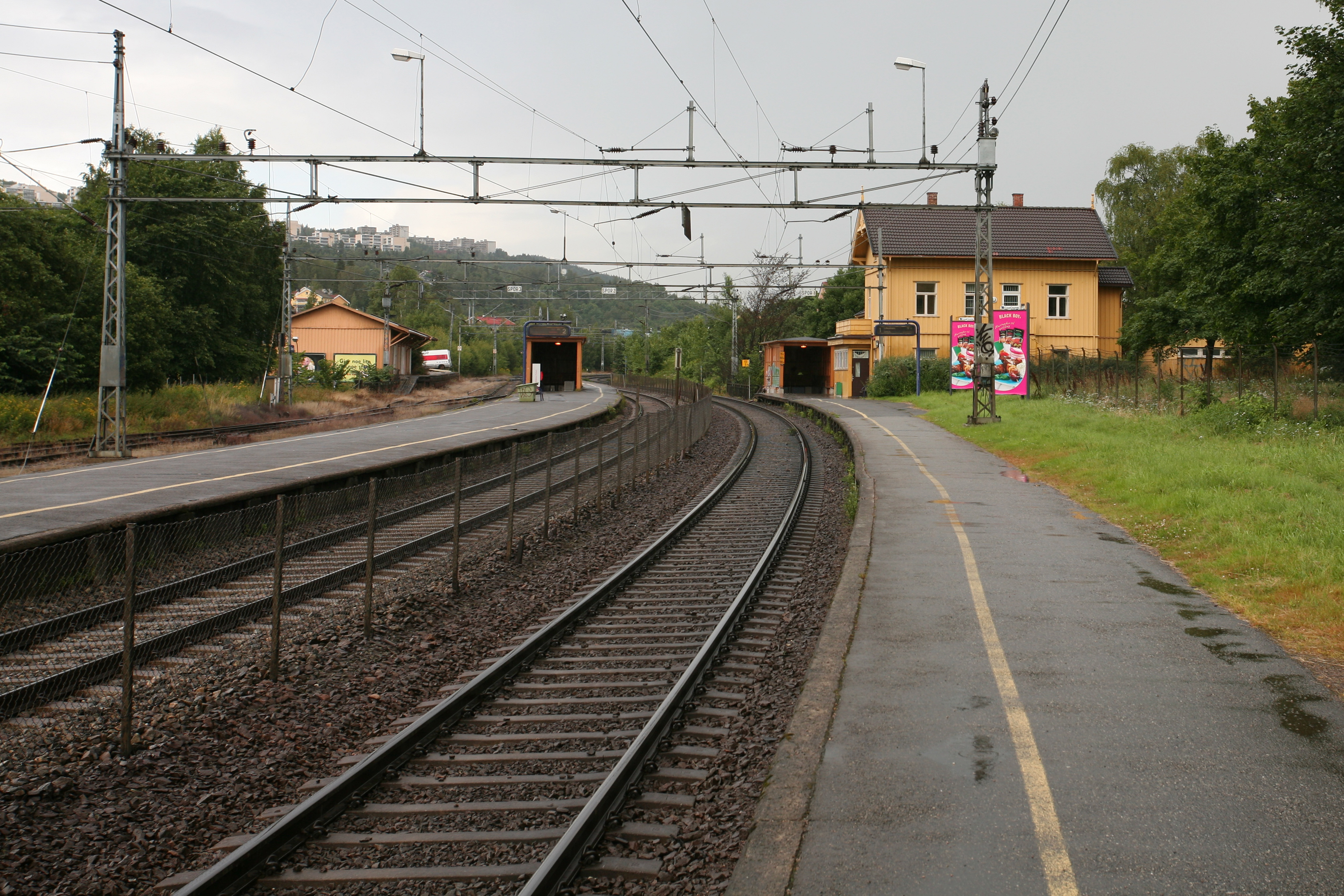
Grorud Station

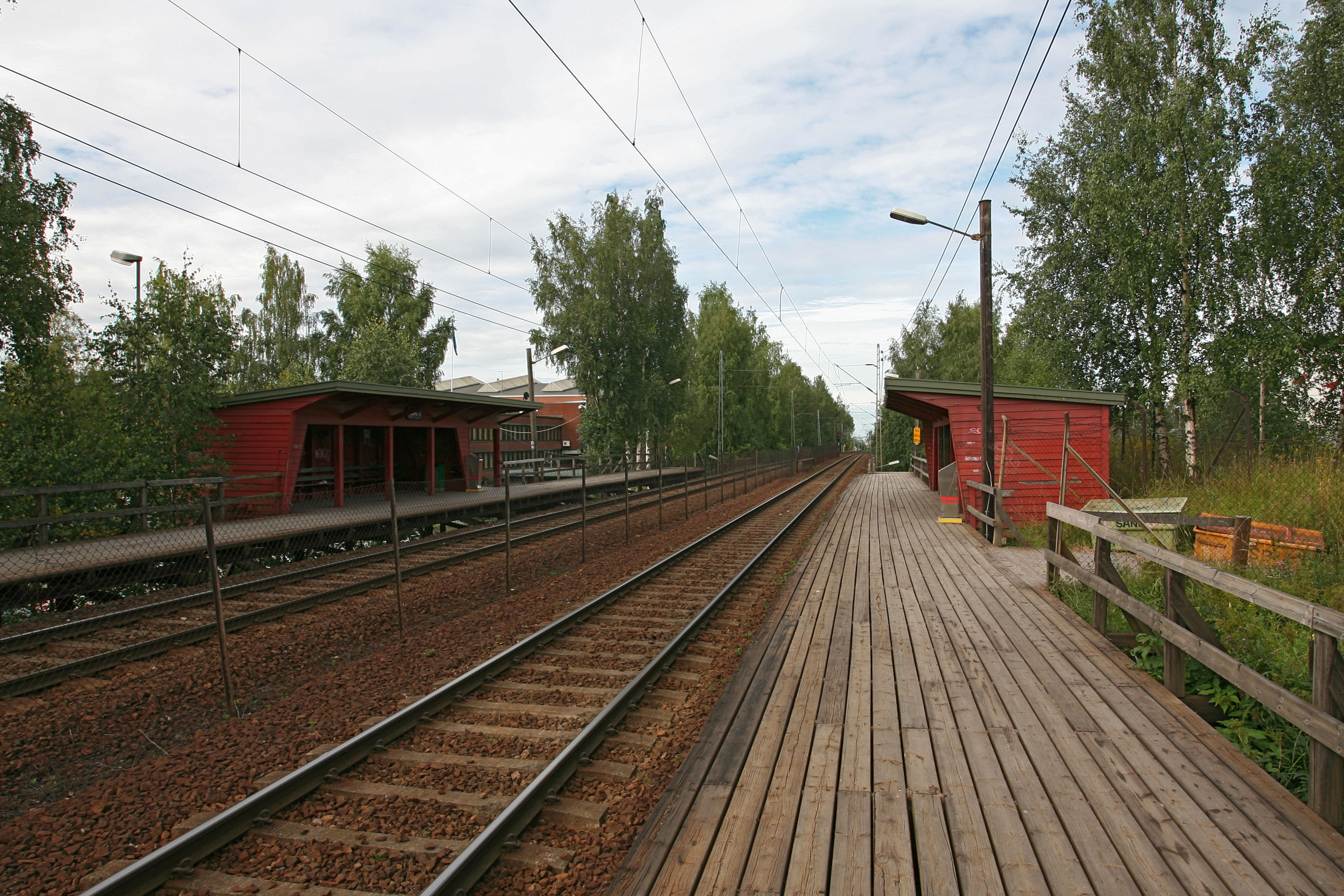
Nyland Station

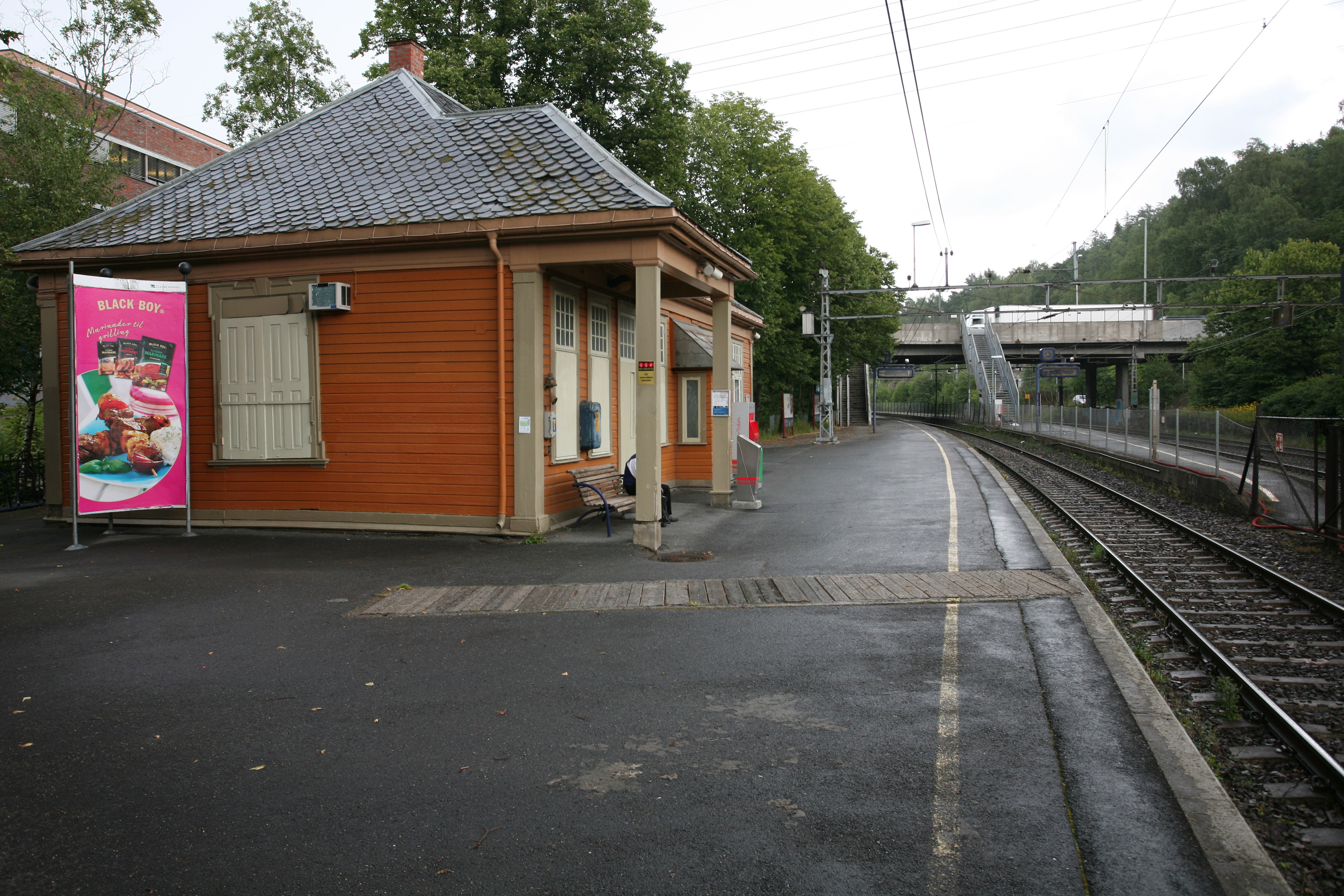
Bryn Station

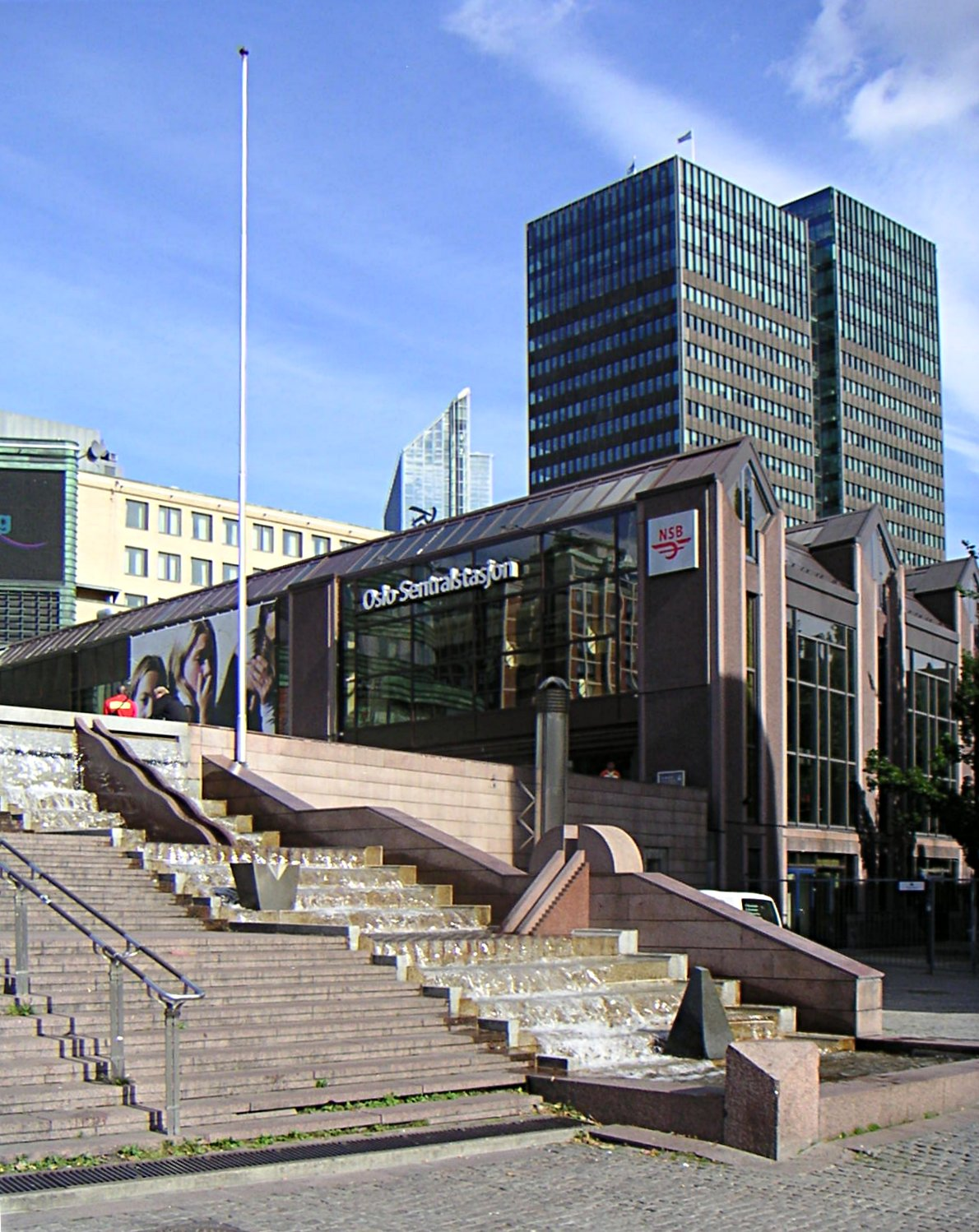
Oslo Central Station
