= Skarnes =

Village in Sør-Odal Municipality, Norway

- Village
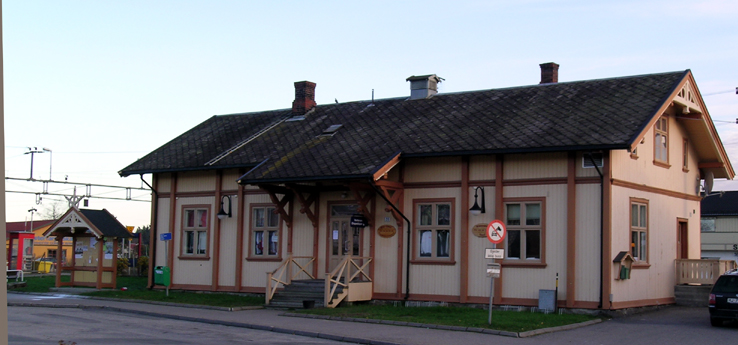
- View of the village railway station
- Interactive map of Skarnes
- Location within Innlandet Location within Norway
- Coordinates: 60.25391°N 11.68486°E
- Country: Norway
- Region: Eastern Norway
- County: Innlandet
- District: Odalen
- Municipality: Sør-Odal Municipality

Area
  - Total: 2.44 km^{2} (0.94 sq mi)
- Elevation: 134 m (440 ft)

Population (2024)
  - Total: 2,728
  - Density: 1,118/km^{2} (2,900/sq mi)
- Time zone: UTC+01:00 (CET)
  - Summer (DST): UTC+02:00 (CEST)
- Post Code: 2100 Skarnes

Skarnes is the administrative centre of Sør-Odal Municipality in Innlandet county, Norway. The village is situated along the river Glomma, about halfway between the villages of Disenå and Sander. The new Sør-Odal municipal hall is located in the village, and construction was completed in 2010.

The Kongsvingerbanen railway line runs through the village, stopping at Skarnes Station, which opened in 1862. The European route E16 highway also runs through the village. The Oppstad Church is located about 4 kilometres (2.5 mi) north of the village.

The 2.44-square-kilometre (600-acre) village has a population (2024) of 2,728 and a population density of 1,118 inhabitants per square kilometre (2,900/sq mi).

== Location ==
The village consists of three parts. The "original" Skarnes is on the south side of the river Glomma, near a bridge. The area called Tronbøl lies south of the original village, on the same side of the river. The third part of the village is Korsmo, across the river to the northwest.

== Notable people ==
- Charles Berstad (born 1964), a football player
- Magnus Gullerud (born 1991), a handball player
- Kent Håvard Eriksen (born 1991), a football player
- Kåre Tveter (1922–2012), a painter
- Øystein Sunde (born 1947), a musician
- Hanne Tveter (born 1974), a jazz vocalist
- Elias Akselsen (born 1947), a singer
- Veronica Akselsen (born 1986), a singer
