= Bondevik (surname) =

Bondevik is a Norwegian surname. otable people with the surname include:

- Borghild Bondevik Haga (1906–1990) Norwegian politician
- Gunnar Bondevik (1902–1987), Norwegian priest
- Jarle Bondevik (1934–2016), Norwegian philologist
- Kjell Magne Bondevik (born 1947), Norwegian Lutheran minister and politician
- Kjell Bondevik (1901–1983), Norwegian politician
- Odd Bondevik (1941–2014), Norwegian bishop

== Other ==
- Bondevik's First Cabinet, governed Norway 1997–2000
- Bondevik's Second Cabinet, governed Norway 2001–2005
