= Halfdan Tschudi Bondevik =

Norwegian priest

Halfdan Tschudi Bondevik (born 22 March 1931) is a Norwegian priest.

He was born in Jølster Municipality as a son of Gunnar Bondevik and Maine Cröger Tschudi. The family moved to Lom Municipality in 1936 and Oslo in 1946. On the maternal side he is a nephew of nephew of theologian Stephan Tschudi and a second cousin of Stephan Tschudi-Madsen. On the paternal side he is a nephew of Ottar Bondevik and Borghild Bondevik Haga, first cousin of Odd and Kjell Magne Bondevik, and through that part of the family a first cousin once removed of Johannes and Kjell Bondevik.

He minored in English at the University of Oslo in 1953 and took the cand.theol. degree at the MF Norwegian School of Theology in 1957. After a period as leader of Norsk Kristelig Studieråd from to 1957 to 1960 he began a long career in the Norwegian Church Abroad. He was stationed as a seamen's priest in Rotterdam from 1960 to 1962, Curacao from 1962 to 1966 and Antwerp from 1966 to 1971. He then served as a curate in Nedre Stjørdal in Norway from 1971 to 1976.

Bondevik then served as a secretary in the Norwegian Seamen's Mission from 1976. In 1982 he was promoted to secretary-general. From 1989 to 2001 he served as the dean of Bergen Cathedral. He then served a final term as priest of the Norwegian Seamen's Church, San Francisco until 2004.

Bondevik was a member of the Diocesan Council of Nidaros from 1974 to 1976, central board member of the Norwegian Association of Clergy from 1980 to 1986 and member of the Church of Norway Council on Ecumenical and International Relations from 1986 to 1994.
