= Audunbakkenfestivalen =

Audunbakkenfestivalen is a small rock festival held in Norway, in Disenå in Sør-Odal Municipality, about 18 miles (29 km) from Kongsvinger and 44 miles (71 km) from Oslo. The festival area is located up in the woods opposite Disenå Sport Square.

The festival was first organized in 2003 and spans two days, usually in early August. In 2005, the festival was named Norway's third best rock festival by the Norwegian Rock Federal.

The festival is organized entirely on charity. In 2011, Audunbakken received Sør-Odal municipality's cultural award.

In 2020, the Audunbakkenfestivalen was one of the few festivals that was organized despite the covid-19 pandemic, with 150 paying guests. It was also the last year that Audunbakken was held in the gravel roof. From 2021, the festival held at another location in Sør-Odal.
