= 1984 UEFA European Under-16 Championship qualifying =

Football tournament qualification stage

This page describes the qualifying procedure for the 1984 UEFA European Under-16 Football Championship. 27 teams were divided into 8 groups of two, three and four teams each. The eight winners advanced to the quarterfinals, consisting in two-legged rounds. The four winners of the quarterfinals advanced to the final tournament.

== Group stage ==
=== Group 1 ===
Team	Pld	W	D	L	GF	GA	GD	Pts
England	4	4	0	0	13	2	+11	8
Scotland	4	1	1	2	4	9	–5	3
Iceland	4	0	1	3	3	9	–6	1

19 June 1983

Iceland	1–2	Scotland

Akranes

7 September 1983

Iceland	1–2	England

Reykjavík

17 September 1983

Scotland	1–1	Iceland

Kilmarnock

19 September 1983

England	4–0	Iceland

Blackburn

5 October 1983

England	3–1	Scotland

Middlesbrough

19 October 1983

Scotland	0–4	England

Motherwell

=== Group 2 ===
Team	Pld	W	D	L	GF	GA	GD	Pts
West Germany	6	6	0	0	15	3	+12	12
Sweden	6	3	1	2	4	4	0	7
East Germany	6	1	2	3	7	10	–3	4
Norway	6	0	1	5	7	16	–9	1

20 October 1982

East Germany	0–0	Sweden

Geithain

13 April 1983

West Germany	5–0	East Germany

Braunschweig

4 May 1983

Norway	1–2	Sweden

Sandefjord
7 May 1983

East Germany	0–1	West Germany

Eisenhüttenstadt

6 September 1983

Sweden	1–0	Norway

Östersund

14 September 1983

Sweden	0–1	West Germany

Kalmar

1 October 1983

West Germany	2–0	Sweden

Lübeck

9 October 1983

Norway	2–2	East Germany

Sander

12 October 1983

Norway	0–2	West Germany

Kongsvinger

22 October 1983

Sweden	1–0	East Germany

Ystad

2 November 1983

East Germany	5–1	Norway

Gräfenhainichen

6 November 1983

West Germany	4–3	Norway

Fulda

=== Group 3 ===
Team	Pld	W	D	L	GF	GA	GD	Pts
Soviet Union	4	4	0	0	13	3	+10	8
Finland	4	1	0	3	4	7	-3	2
Poland	4	1	0	3	4	11	-7	2

May 15, 1983

Soviet Union	6–1	Poland

Minsk

June 1, 1983

Finland	0–3	Soviet Union

Kuusankoski

September 8, 1983

Finland	2–0	Poland

Nokia

October 2, 1983

Poland	1–2	Soviet Union

Białystok

October 13, 1983

Soviet Union	2–1	Finland

Moscow

October 16, 1983

Poland	2–1	Finland

Suwałki

=== Group 4 ===
Team	Pld	W	D	L	GF	GA	GD	Pts
Netherlands	6	4	2	0	16	2	+14	10
Denmark	6	3	2	1	8	4	+4	8
Switzerland	6	2	1	3	12	8	+4	5
Luxembourg	6	0	1	5	1	23	–22	1

3 November 1982

Switzerland	1–1	Netherlands

Wallisellen

9 November 1982

Luxembourg	0–0	Denmark

Esch-sur-Alzette

11 November 1982

Netherlands	1–1	Denmark

Wormerveer

16 March 1983

Netherlands	5–0	Luxembourg

Weert

20 April 1983

Luxembourg	1–5	Switzerland

Niederkorn

5 May 1983

Switzerland	5–0	Luxembourg

Liestal

11 May 1983

Denmark	2–0	Switzerland

Copenhagen

23 September 1983

Denmark	0–2	Netherlands

Helsingør

21 September 1983

Luxembourg	0–5	Netherlands

Echternach

27 September 1983

Netherlands	2–0	Switzerland

Papendrecht

12 October 1983

Denmark	3–0	Luxembourg

Østerbro

22 October 1983

Switzerland	1–2	Denmark

Steffisburg

=== Group 5 ===
Team	Pld	W	D	L	GF	GA	GD	Pts
Italy	2	2	0	0	3	0	+3	4
Austria	2	0	0	2	0	3	–3	0

15 June 1983

Austria	0–2	Italy

Villach

12 October 1983

Italy	1–0	Austria

Mestre

=== Group 6 ===
Team	Pld	W	D	L	GF	GA	GD	Pts
France	6	4	1	1	9	4	+5	9
Spain	6	4	0	2	12	3	+9	8
Belgium	6	2	1	3	7	11	–4	5
Portugal	6	1	0	5	5	15	–10	2

1 December 1982

Spain	3 – 0	Belgium

Murcia

23 February 1983

France	3–0	Portugal

Mestre

9 March 1983

Portugal	0–3	Spain

Évora
9 March 1983

Belgium	1–1	France

Mechelen

23 March 1983

France	1–0	Spain

Agen
23 March 1983

Belgium	3–0	Portugal

Mechelen

20 April 1983

Portugal	2–3	Belgium

Paços de Ferreira

27 April 1983

Spain	0–2	France

Guadalajara

26 October 1983

Belgium	0–3	Spain

Duffel

26 November 1983

France	2–0	Belgium

Blois
30 November 1983

Spain	3–0	Portugal

Plasencia

7 December 1983

Portugal	3–0	France

Lisbon

=== Group 7 ===
Team	Pld	W	D	L	GF	GA	GD	Pts
Yugoslavia	6	3	2	1	14	6	+8	8
Czechoslovakia	6	4	0	2	9	9	0	8
Romania	6	2	1	3	5	8	–3	5
Greece	6	1	1	4	6	11	–5	3

23 February 1983

Greece	1–1	Yugoslavia

Alexandroupoli

27 April 1983

Romania	1–0	Greece

Galaţi

25 May 1983

Czechoslovakia	3–2	Greece

České Budějovice

8 June 1983

Romania	1–0	Czechoslovakia

Constanţa

31 August 1983

Romania	1–1	Yugoslavia

Alba Iulia

15 September 1983

Greece	0–2	Czechoslovakia

Trikala

28 September 1983

Yugoslavia	3–1	Romania

Kladovo

6 October 1983

Yugoslavia	5–0	Czechoslovakia

Stara Pazova

23 October 1983

Czechoslovakia	1–0	Yugoslavia

Skuteč

9 November 1983

Yugoslavia	4–2	Greece

Bitola

29 November 1983

Czechoslovakia	3–1	Romania

Považská Bystrica

7 December 1983

Greece	1–0	Romania

Chania

=== Group 8 ===
Team	Pld	W	D	L	GF	GA	GD	Pts
Bulgaria	4	2	1	1	7	3	+4	5
Hungary	4	2	1	1	5	2	+3	5
Turkey	4	1	0	3	2	9	–7	2

20 February 1983

Turkey	1–2	Bulgaria

Bursa

15 May 1983

Bulgaria	4–0	Turkey

Gorna Oryahovitsa

11 September 1983

Hungary	1–1	Bulgaria

Cegléd

19 October 1983

Bulgaria	0–1	Hungary

Ihtiman

28 October 1983

Hungary	3–0	Turkey

Eger

2 November 1983

Turkey	1–0	Hungary

Istanbul

== Quarterfinals ==
=== First leg ===
February 15, 1984

Italy	1 – 1	Yugoslavia

Montevarchi

March 1, 1984

England	4 – 0	France

Watford

March 11, 1984

Bulgaria	1 – 0	Soviet Union

Lahti

April 7, 1984

Netherlands	0 – 4	West Germany

Enschede

=== Second leg ===
March 14, 1984

Yugoslavia	1 – 0	Italy

Umag

Yugoslavia won 2–1 on aggregate.

March 21, 1984

France	1 – 1	England

Bourg-en-Bresse

England won 5–1 on aggregate.

March 28, 1984

Soviet Union	3 – 0	Bulgaria

Baku

Soviet Union won 3–1 on aggregate.

April 30, 1984

West Germany	2 – 2	Netherlands

Hagen

West Germany won 6–2 on aggregate.
