= Gunnar Bondevik =

Norwegian priest

Gunnar Bondevik (19 February 1902 – 1987) was a Norwegian priest.

== Personal life ==
He was born in Sogndal Municipality as a son of teacher Nils Bondevik (1874–1961) and Kari Hauge (1867–1958). He was a brother of Ottar Bondevik and Borghild Bondevik Haga, first cousin of Kjell and Johannes Bondevik, and through that part of the family a first cousin once removed of Odd and Kjell Magne Bondevik.

In 1928 he married Maine Cröger Tschudi. Through her he was a brother-in-law of theologian Stephan Tschudi. His wife was also a first cousin of Stephan Tschudi-Madsen, Sr. Gunnar and Maine's son Halfdan Tschudi Bondevik also had high positions in the church.

== Career ==
He finished his secondary education in 1922 and took the cand. theol. degree at the University of Oslo in 1927. In the following year he finished the practical-theological seminary. His first post was as vicar of Jølster Municipality in 1928. He got the same position in Lom Municipality in 1936 before being appointed as dean of Nord-Gudbrandsdal in 1938.

He then lived in Oslo as a secretary in the city's Inner Mission from 1946 and vicar of Ullern Church from 1952 to 1965. From 1952 to 1958 he chaired the Norwegian Christian Youth Association (YMCA). He was also a national board member of the Norwegian Association of Clergy. In 1965 he was appointed as vicar of Lillehammer Church and dean of Sør-Gudbrandsdal. He retired in 1972 and moved back to Oslo. He died in 1987.
