= Disenå =

Village in Sør-Odal Municipality, Norway

- Village
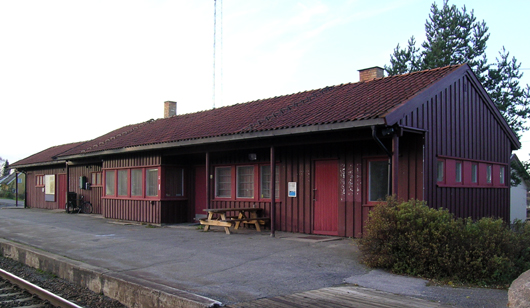
- View of the village railway station
- Interactive map of Disenå
- Location within Innlandet Location within Norway
- Coordinates: 60.20658°N 11.64155°E
- Country: Norway
- Region: Eastern Norway
- County: Innlandet
- District: Odalen
- Municipality: Sør-Odal Municipality

Area
  - Total: 0.52 km^{2} (0.20 sq mi)
- Elevation: 136 m (446 ft)

Population (2024)
  - Total: 260
  - Density: 500/km^{2} (1,300/sq mi)
- Time zone: UTC+01:00 (CET)
  - Summer (DST): UTC+02:00 (CEST)
- Post Code: 2114 Disenå

Disenå is a village in Sør-Odal Municipality in Innlandet county, Norway. The main part of the village is located south of the river Glomma, about 5 kilometres (3.1 mi) southwest of the village of Skarnes. The Kongsvingerbanen railway line passes through the village. The Disenå Station on the railway was closed in 2012.

The 0.52-square-kilometre (130-acre) village has a population (2024) of 260 and a population density of 500 inhabitants per square kilometre (1,300/sq mi).

Every August the Audunbakkenfestivalen is held in the village.
