= Sander IL =

Norwegian sports club

- Full name: Sander Idrettslag
- Founded: 1920
- Ground: Sandermoen gress, Sander
- League: 4. divisjon
- 2019: 7th

Sander Idrettslag is a Norwegian multi-sports club from Sander in Sør-Odal Municipality in Innlandet county. It has sections for association football and Nordic skiing. The club was founded in 1920.

The men's football team plays in the 4. divisjon, the fifth tier of Norwegian football. It was a mainstay in the 3. divisjon from 1998 to 2010 and later had two shorter stints in 2012–2014 and 2016. Sander's proximity to the city of Kongsvinger meant that several players featured for Sander before or after playing for Kongsvinger IL, including Norway international Martin Linnes.
