= Henrik Christian Rørholt =

Norwegian military officer and politician

Henrik Christian Rørholt (11 January 1883 – 4 December 1954) was a Norwegian military officer and politician for the Agrarian Party.

He was born in Hamar as a son of principal Arnold Andersen Rørholt (1842–1915) and Anne Marie Laurentze, née Borchgrevink (1854–1919). After finishing his secondary education in 1900 he was enlisted in the Armed Forces from 1904, graduated from the Norwegian Military College in 1907 and then worked for the Geographical Survey for two years. He saw battle action during Operation Weserübung in 1940.

From 1911 he was a forest owner in Sør-Odal Municipality. He was elected to six terms on the municipal council for Sør-Odal Municipality between 1916 and 1934. He was elected as a deputy representative to the Parliament of Norway in 1924 from the constituency Hedmark, meeting in parliamentary session in 1926.

He was a member of the Agrarian Party's county board from 1921 to 1946, serving three years as chairman, chaired the county branch of the Norwegian Forestry Society from 1924 and the regional branch of the Norwegian Agrarian Association from 1931 to 1946 (and deputy member of the Norwegian Agrarian Association's national board from 1934). He also chaired the supervisory council of the Norwegian Forest Owners Association from 1927 to 1929.

In the media, Rørholt was a board member of Østlendingen and chaired the supervisory council of Nationen. In business, he was a board member of Norges Varemesse and Glommendalens Bank, the supervisory council of Skogbrand (chair) and Borregaard.
