= Kent Håvard Eriksen =

Norwegian footballer (born 1991)

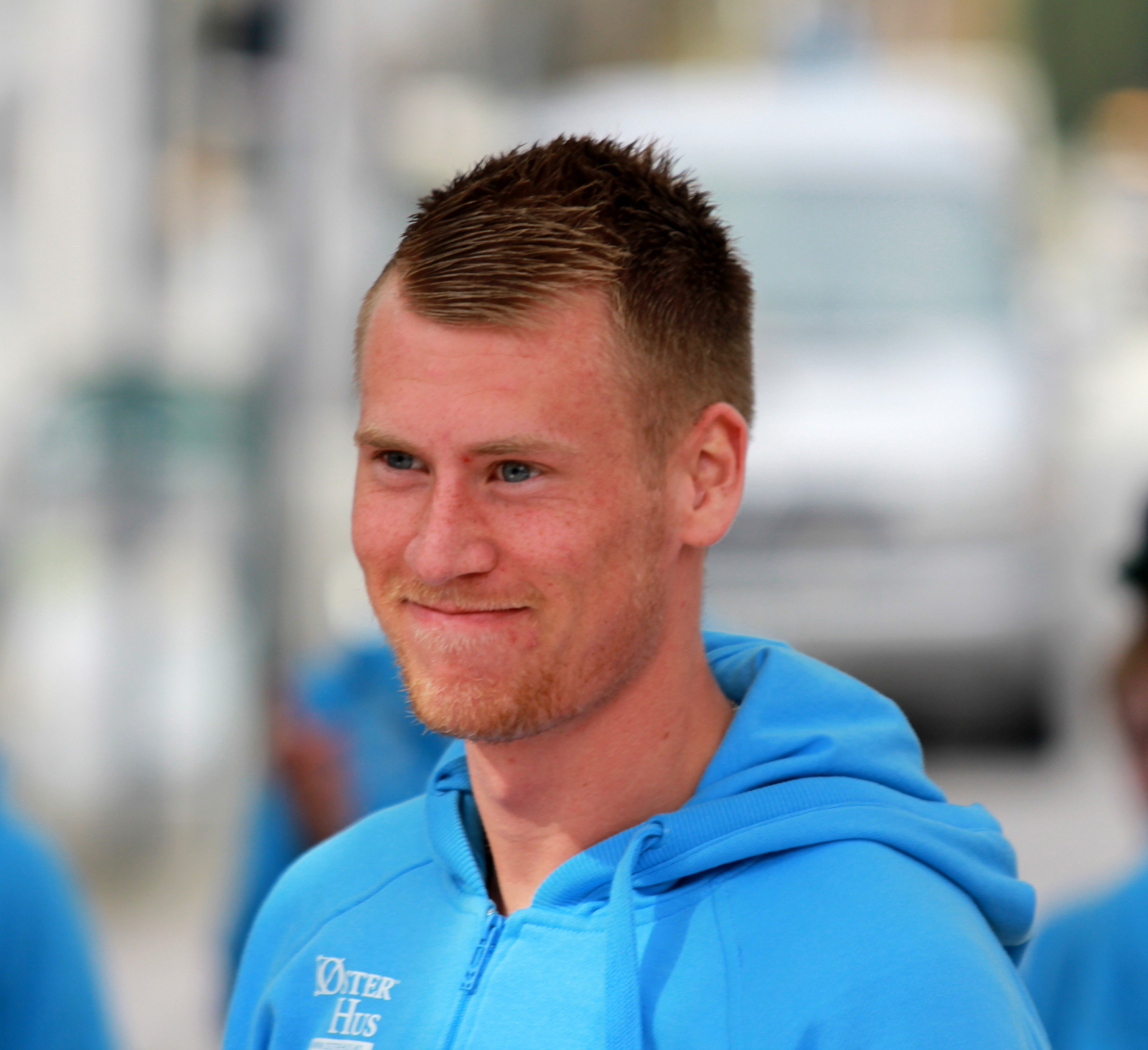

Personal information
- Full name: Kent Håvard Eriksen
- Date of birth: 29 May 1991 (age 35)
- Place of birth: Skarnes, Norway
- Height: 1.89 m (6 ft 2 in)
- Position: Striker

Senior career*
Years	Team	Apps	(Gls)
2009–2010	Sander	17	(15)
2010	Bournemouth FC	14	(16)
2011	FUVO	24	(29)
2012–2013	Elverum	49	(21)
2014–2021	Sandnes Ulf	162	(67)
2021	Lillestrøm	2	(0)
2021–2022	Mjøndalen	20	(3)
- * Club domestic league appearances and goals as of 19 May 2022

Kent Håvard Eriksen (born 29 May 1991) is a Norwegian former footballer who played as a striker.

== Club career ==
Eriksen was born in Skarnes. He made his debut for Elverum in the 0–0 draw against Nybergsund on 14 April 2012. He scored his first goal for the club in the 2–2 draw against Fram Larvik on 21 April 2012.

Ahead of the 2012/2013 season, thanks to I-N-I Music & Sport Agency, Eriksen was invited for trials by Polish Ekstraklasa club Lechia Gdansk, but no contract was offered. Despite that, he managed to move up a tier, to Sandnes Ulf of Norwegian Premier League. He made his first-tier debut in March 2014 against Odd. In the 2015 season he scored 7 league goals and 3 cup goals, 2016 season followed with a great season with 12 goals in the league and 5 in the cup a season that put Sandnes Ulf for qualification back to Tippeligaen after they got relegated in 2014. After a great season for Sandnes Ulf in 2016 he signed another contract that last until December 2018. In the summer of 2017 he was near to sign a deal with Bodo/Glimt but a last minute decline on a 2 million NOK bid on Eriksen left him no choice than to stay in Sandnes Ulf.

During the winter of 2018, Fk Haugesund wanted to buy him, but again the offer was declined by Sandnes Ulf and the captain stayed in Sandnes Ulf for the 2019 season.

== Career statistics ==
=== Club ===
As of match played 15 May 2022

Appearances and goals by club, season and competition
Club	Season	League			National Cup		Europe		Total	
Club	Season	Division	Apps	Goals	Apps	Goals	Apps	Goals	Apps	Goals
Sander	2009	3. divisjon	17	15	0	0	-		17	15
Sander	Total		17	15	0	0	-	-	17	15
Bournemouth FC	2010–11	Wessex Football League	14	16	0	0	-		14	16
Bournemouth FC	Total		14	16	0	0	-	-	14	16
FUVO	2011	3. divisjon	24	29	0	0	-		24	29
FUVO	Total		24	29	0	0	-	-	24	29
Elverum	2012	Oddsen-ligaen	23	9	1	0	-		24	9
Elverum	2013	Adeccoligaen	26	12	3	0	-		29	12
Elverum	Total		49	21	4	0	-	-	53	21
Sandnes Ulf	2014	Tippeligaen	10	0	1	0	-		11	0
Sandnes Ulf	2015	OBOS-ligaen	28	7	2	3	-		30	10
Sandnes Ulf	2016	OBOS-ligaen	25	13	4	3	-		29	16
Sandnes Ulf	2017	OBOS-ligaen	30	15	2	1	-		32	16
Sandnes Ulf	2018	OBOS-ligaen	10	4	2	0	-		12	4
Sandnes Ulf	2019	OBOS-ligaen	29	14	3	3	-		32	17
Sandnes Ulf	2020	OBOS-ligaen	30	14	0	0	-		30	14
Sandnes Ulf	Total		162	67	14	10	-	-	176	77
Lillestrøm	2021	Eliteserien	2	0	2	0	-		4	0
Lillestrøm	Total		2	0	2	0	-	-	4	0
Mjøndalen	2021	Eliteserien	16	3	0	0	-		16	3
Mjøndalen	2022	OBOS-ligaen	4	0	0	0	-		4	0
Mjøndalen	Total		20	3	0	0	-	-	20	3
Career total			290	145	20	10	-	-	310	155
