= Sander, Norway =

Village in Sør-Odal Municipality, Norway

Sander
- Village
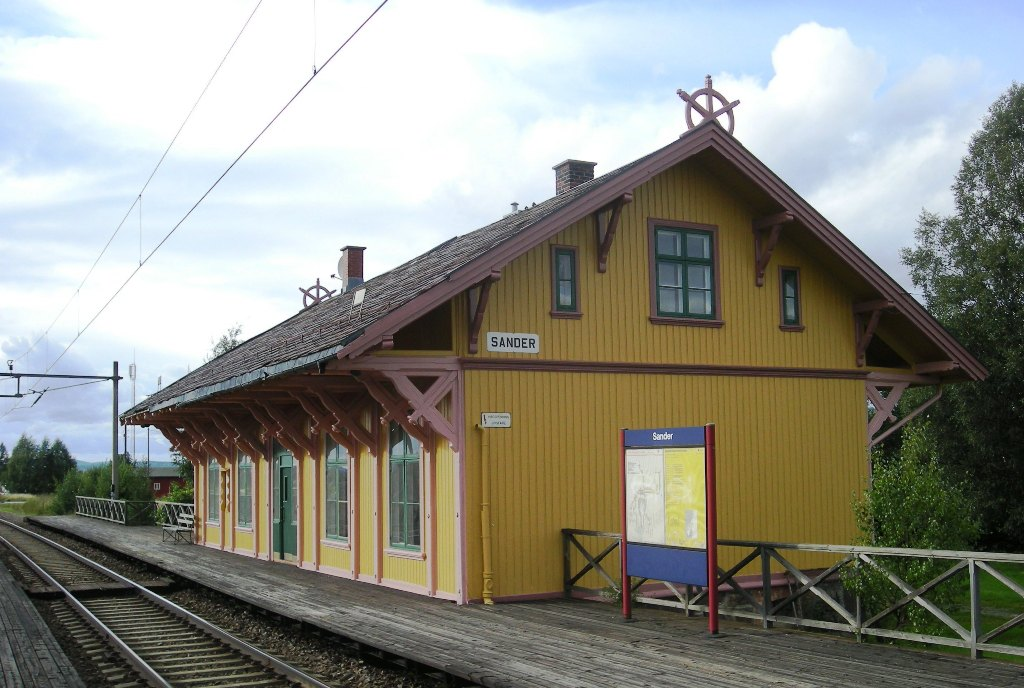
- View of the village railway station
- Interactive map of Sander
- Location within Innlandet Location within Norway
- Coordinates: 60.22751°N 11.80876°E
- Country: Norway
- Region: Eastern Norway
- County: Innlandet
- District: Odalen
- Municipality: Sør-Odal Municipality

Area
  - Total: 0.26 km^{2} (0.10 sq mi)
- Elevation: 141 m (463 ft)

Population (2024)
  - Total: 294
  - Density: 1,131/km^{2} (2,930/sq mi)
- Time zone: UTC+01:00 (CET)
  - Summer (DST): UTC+02:00 (CEST)
- Post Code: 2116 Sander

Sander is a village in Sør-Odal Municipality in Innlandet county, Norway. The village is located along the river Glomma, about 8 kilometres (5.0 mi) southeast of the village of Skarnes. The village has a train station, a kindergarten, an elementary school and a grocery store. The area around the village is dominated by agriculture. Strøm Church lies about 4 kilometres (2.5 mi) northwest of Sander. The local sports club is Sander IL.

The 0.26-square-kilometre (64-acre) village has a population (2024) of 294 and a population density of 1,131 inhabitants per square kilometre (2,930/sq mi).

The Kongsvingerbanen railway line runs through the village. There is a bridge over the river Glomma at Sander, which connects the village to the European route E16 highway that runs along the other side of the river.
