= Magnus Gullerud =

Norwegian handball player (born 1991)

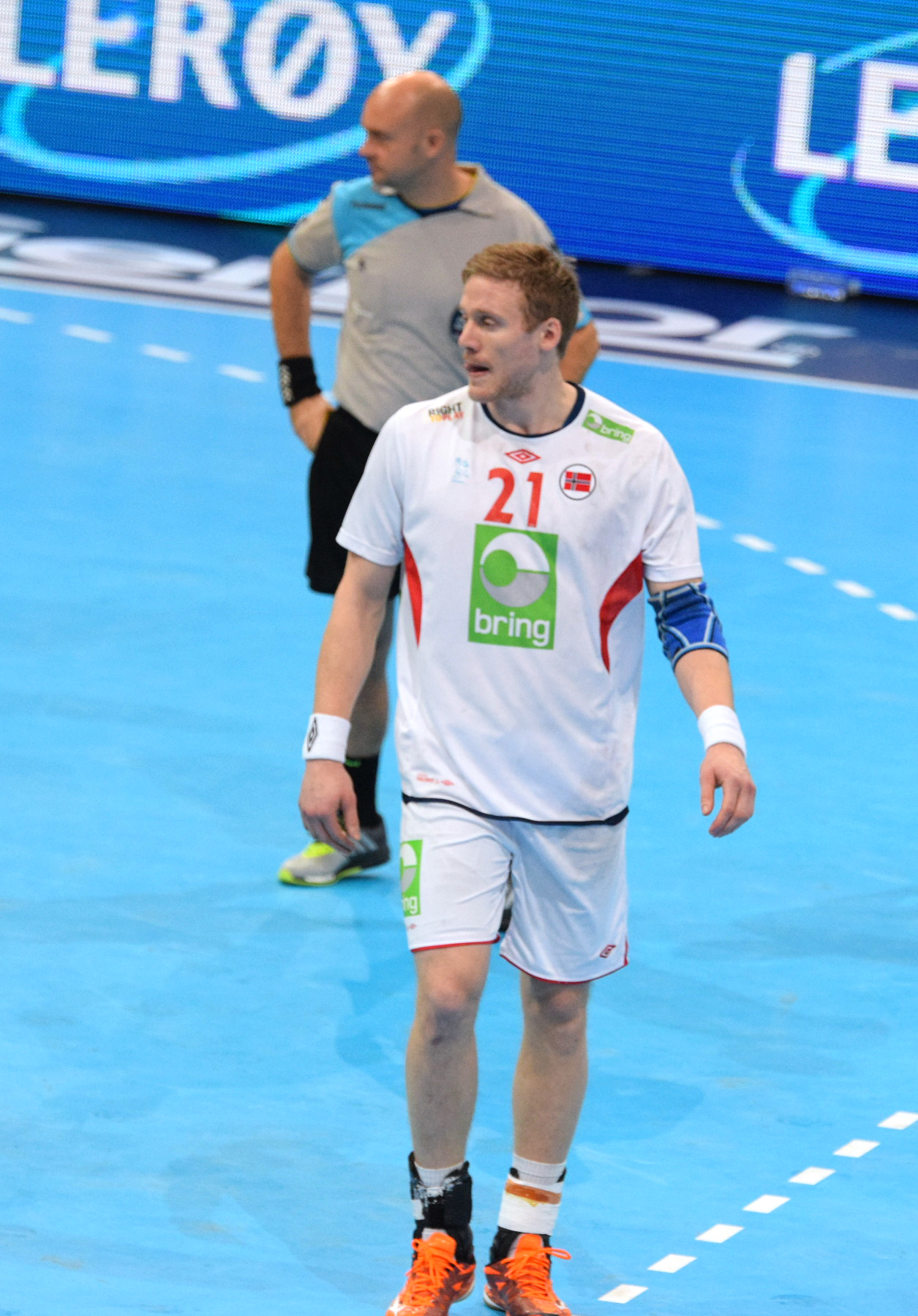
- Gullerud in 2016

Personal information
- Nationality: Norwegian
- Born: 13 November 1991 (age 34) Skarnes, Sør-Odal, Norway
- Height: 1.93 m (6 ft 4 in)

Sport
- Sport: Handball
- Position: Pivot
- Current club: Kolstad Håndball
- Number: 14

Senior clubs
- Years: Team
- –: Skarnes Håndball
- 2009–2013: Elverum Håndball
- 2013–2016: SønderjyskE Håndbold
- 2016–2020: GWD Minden
- 2020–2022: SC Magdeburg
- 2022–: Kolstad Håndball
National team
Years	Team	Apps	(Gls)
2010–	Norway	206	(307)
Medal record
World Championship
Silver medal – second place	2017 France
Silver medal – second place	2019 Germany/Denmark
European Championship
Bronze medal – third place	2020 Sweden/Austria/Norway

Magnus Gullerud (born 13 November 1991) is a Norwegian handball player for Kolstad Håndball and the Norwegian national team.

He participated at the 2019 World Men's Handball Championship.

He started out playing handball for Skarnes Håndball and later signed with Elverum Håndball as an amateur player. In 2009, Magnus Gullerud signed a professional contract with Elverum Håndball.

He was one of six handball players that Kolstad expanded the player staff with in autumn 2021, ahead of the 2022/2023 season.
