= Strøm Church =

Church in Innlandet, Norway

- Strøm kirke
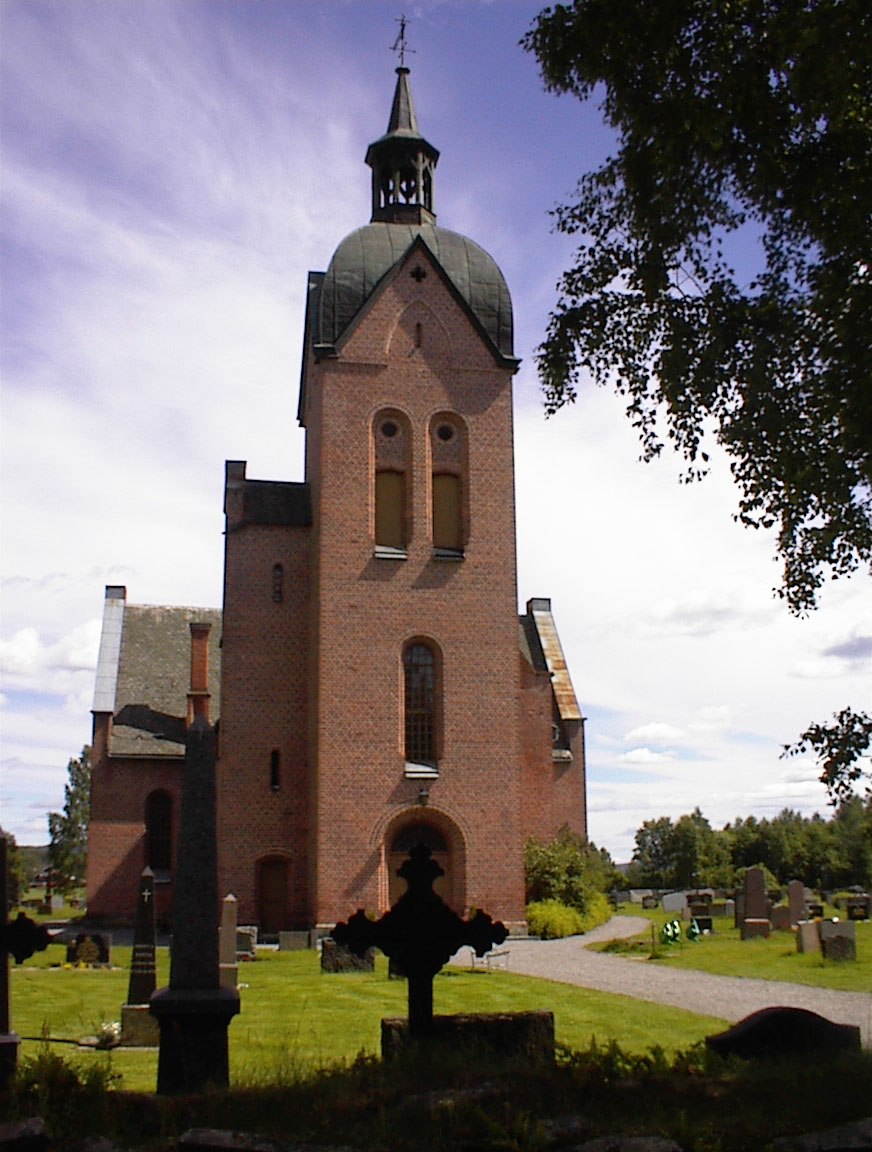
- View of the church
- Strøm Church
- 60°14′37″N 11°45′49″E
- Location: Sør-Odal Municipality, Innlandet
- Country: Norway
- Denomination: Church of Norway
- Previous denomination: Catholic Church
- Churchmanship: Evangelical Lutheran

History
- Status: Parish church
- Founded: 11th century
- Consecrated: 17 July 1857

Architecture
- Functional status: Active
- Architect: Heinrich Ernst Schirmer
- Architectural type: Cruciform
- Completed: 1857 (169 years ago)

Specifications
- Capacity: 500
- Materials: Brick

Administration
- Diocese: Hamar bispedømme
- Deanery: Solør, Vinger og Odal prosti
- Parish: Strøm
- Norwegian Cultural Heritage Site
- Type: Church
- Status: Protected
- ID: 84984

Strøm Church (Norwegian: Strøm kirke) is a parish church of the Church of Norway in Sør-Odal Municipality in Innlandet county, Norway. It is located in the village of Strøm. It is the church for the Strøm parish which is part of the Solør, Vinger og Odal prosti (deanery) in the Diocese of Hamar. The red brick church was built in a cruciform design in 1857 using plans drawn up by the architect Heinrich Ernst Schirmer. The church seats about 500 people.

== History ==
The earliest existing historical records of the church date back to the year 1394, but the church was not new that year. The first church at Strøm was a wooden stave church that was likely built during the 11th century. This church was located about 50 metres (160 ft) southwest of the present church site. It is not entirely clear how many churches have stood on this site, but the old churches were made of wood. Around 1590, the old church was torn down and a new church was built on the same site. Around the year 1700, the church was expanded.

In 1814, this church served as an election church (Norwegian: valgkirke). Together with more than 300 other parish churches across Norway, it was a polling station for elections to the 1814 Norwegian Constituent Assembly which wrote the Constitution of Norway. This was Norway's first national elections. Each church parish was a constituency that elected people called "electors" who later met together in each county to elect the representatives for the assembly that was to meet at Eidsvoll Manor later that year.

In 1853, the parish hired the architect Heinrich Ernst Schirmer to design a new church that would be built about 50 metres (160 ft) to the northeast of the old church. The new church was constructed from 1854 to 1857. It was a brick cruciform building. There is a church porch and tower on the west end of the nave, a choir on the east end of the nave, and a sacristy on the north side of the choir. The new building was consecrated on 17 July 1857. After the new church was completed, the old church was torn down.

== Media gallery ==
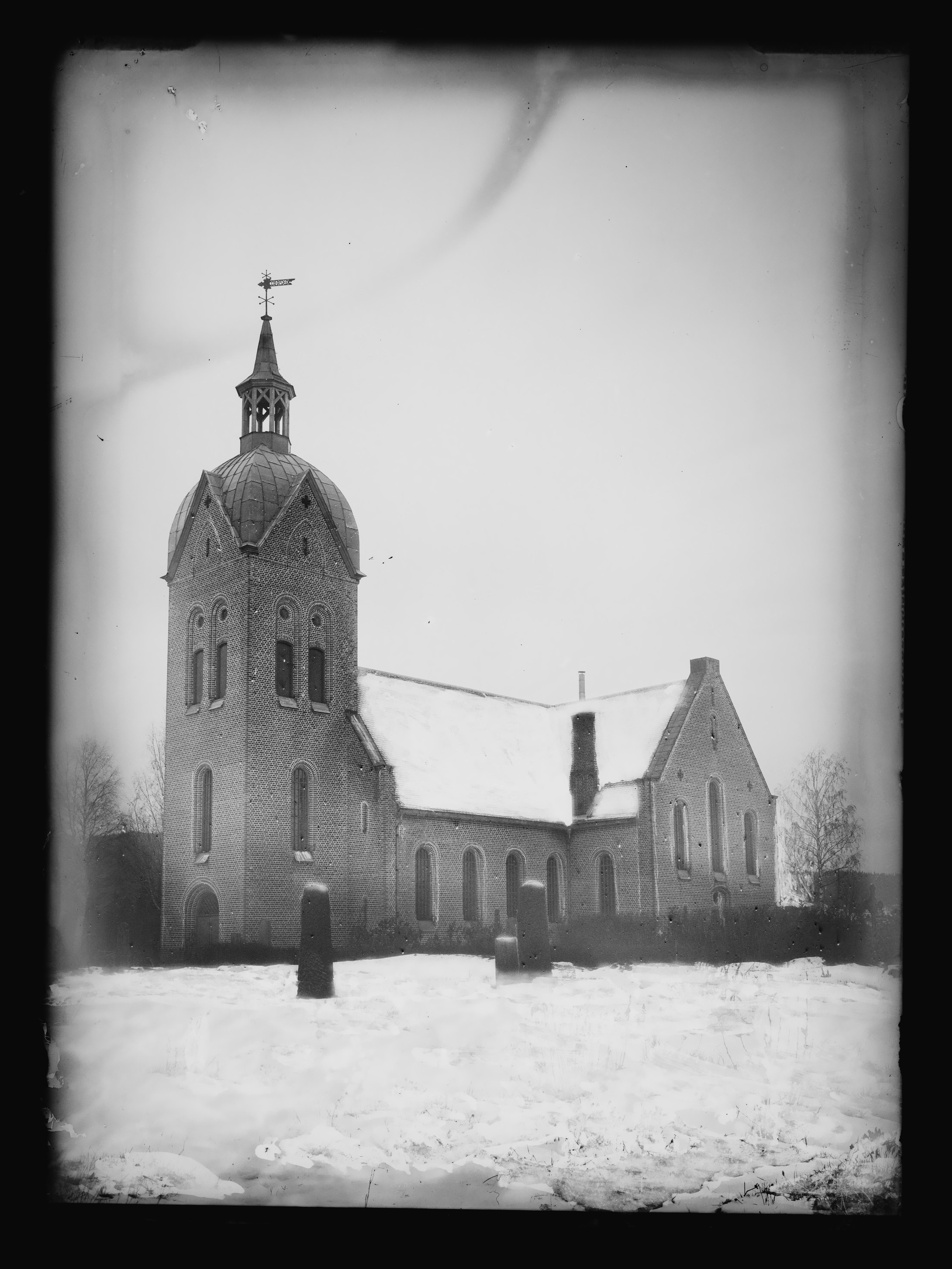

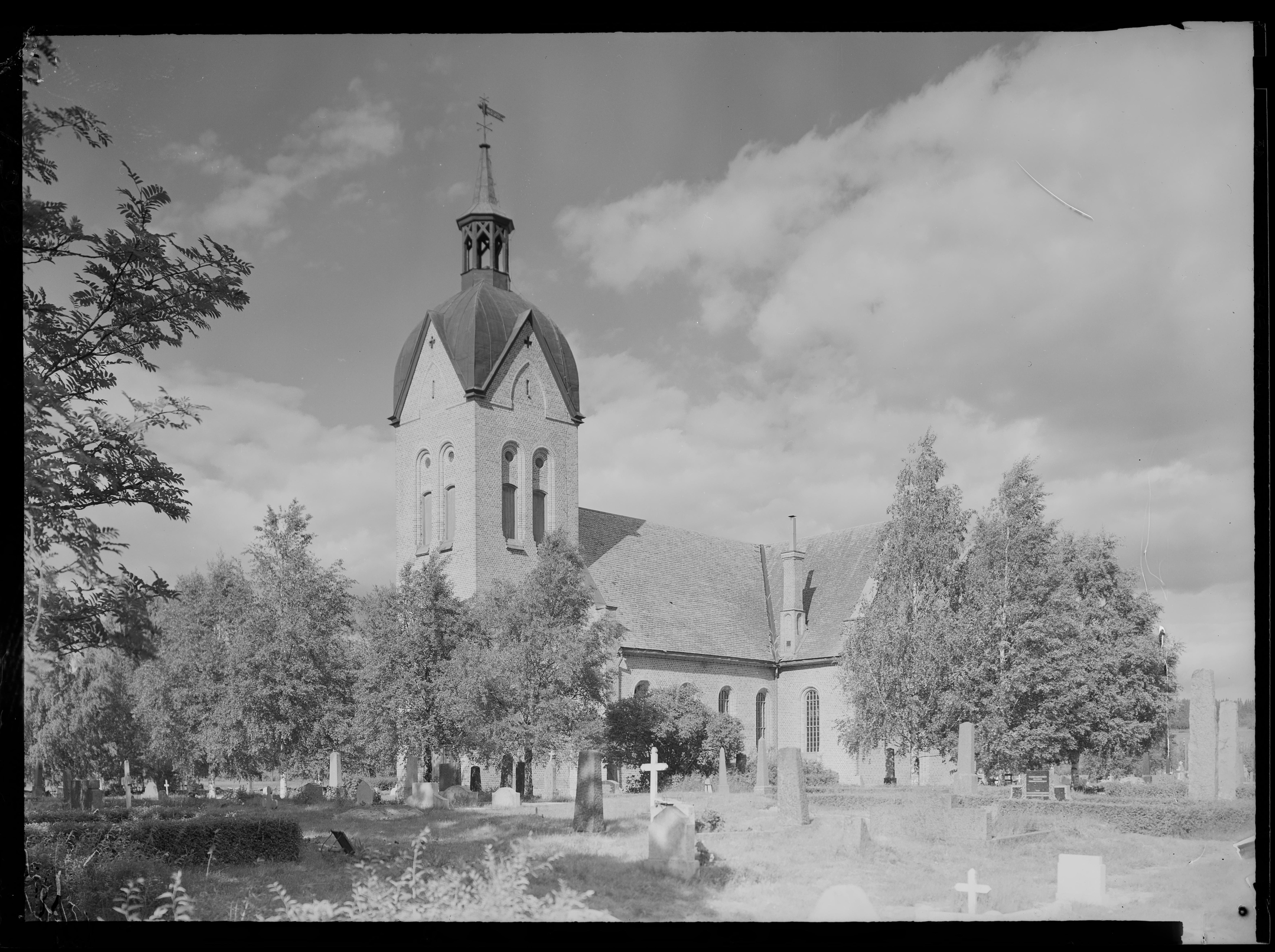

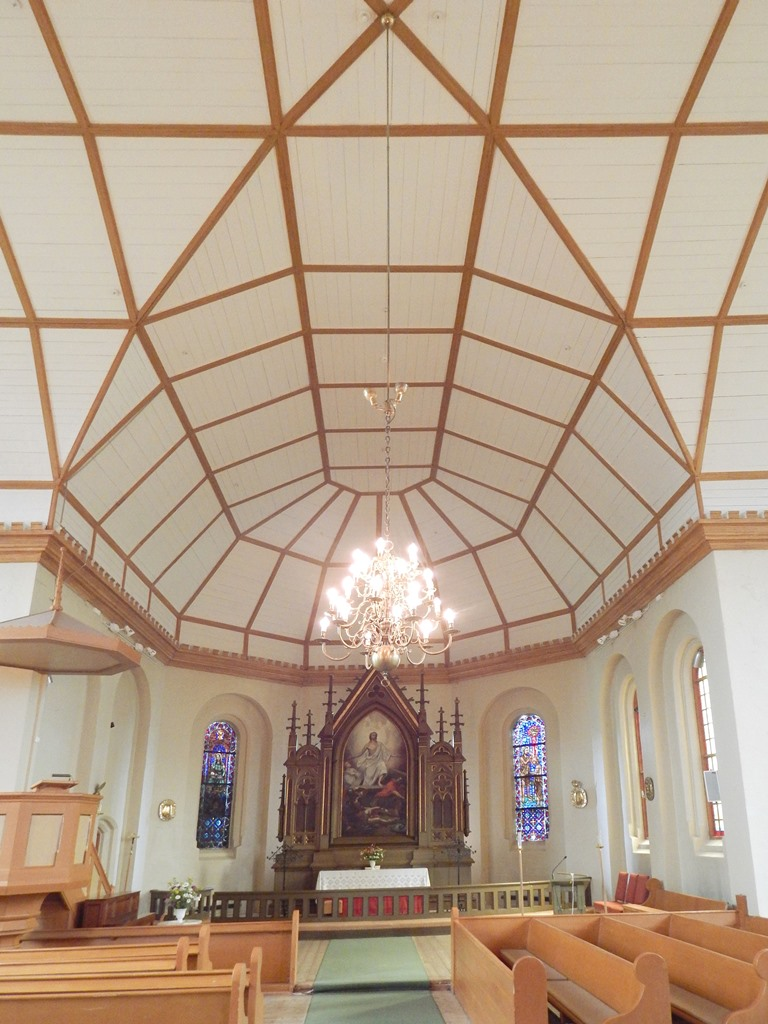

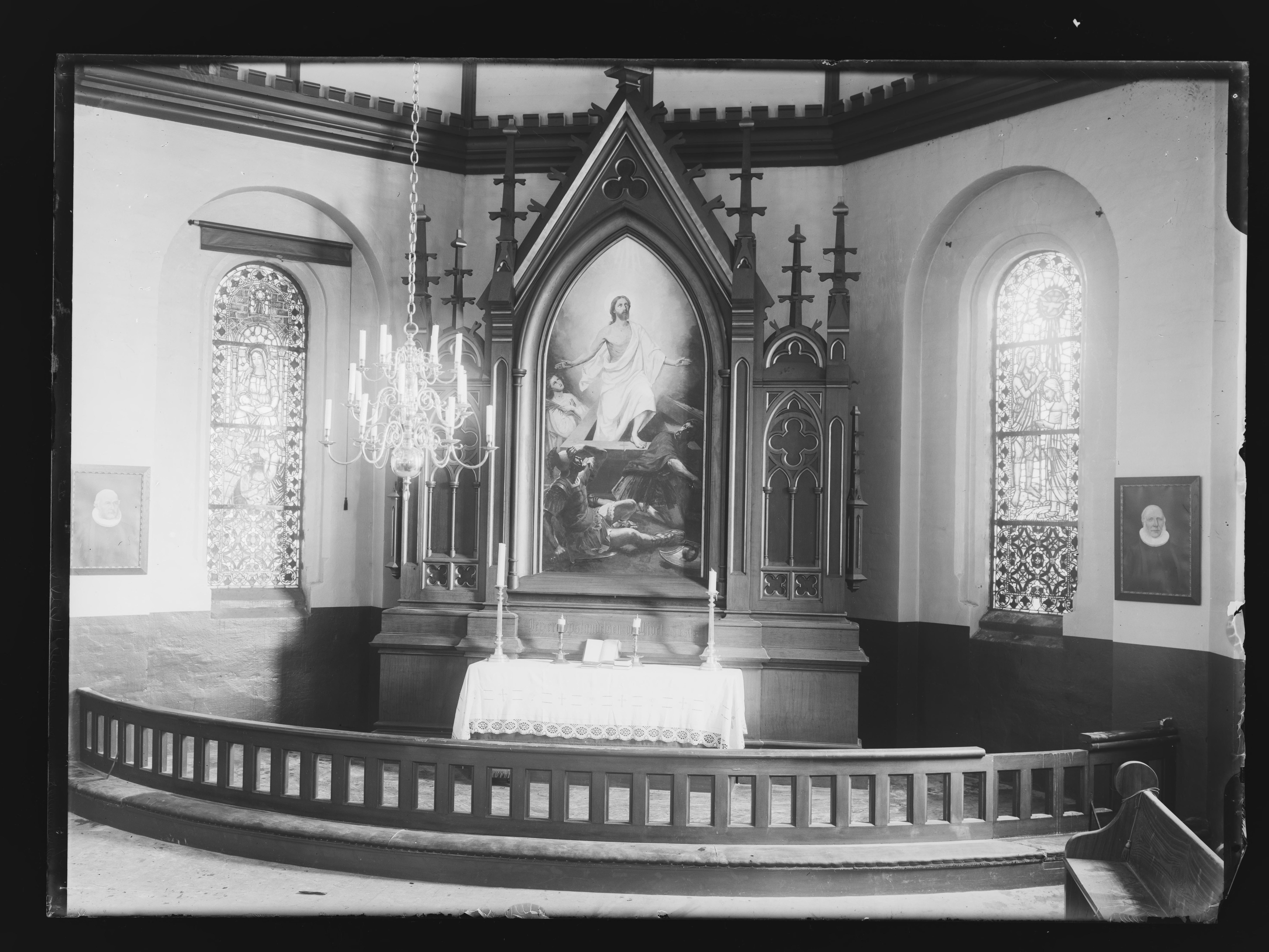

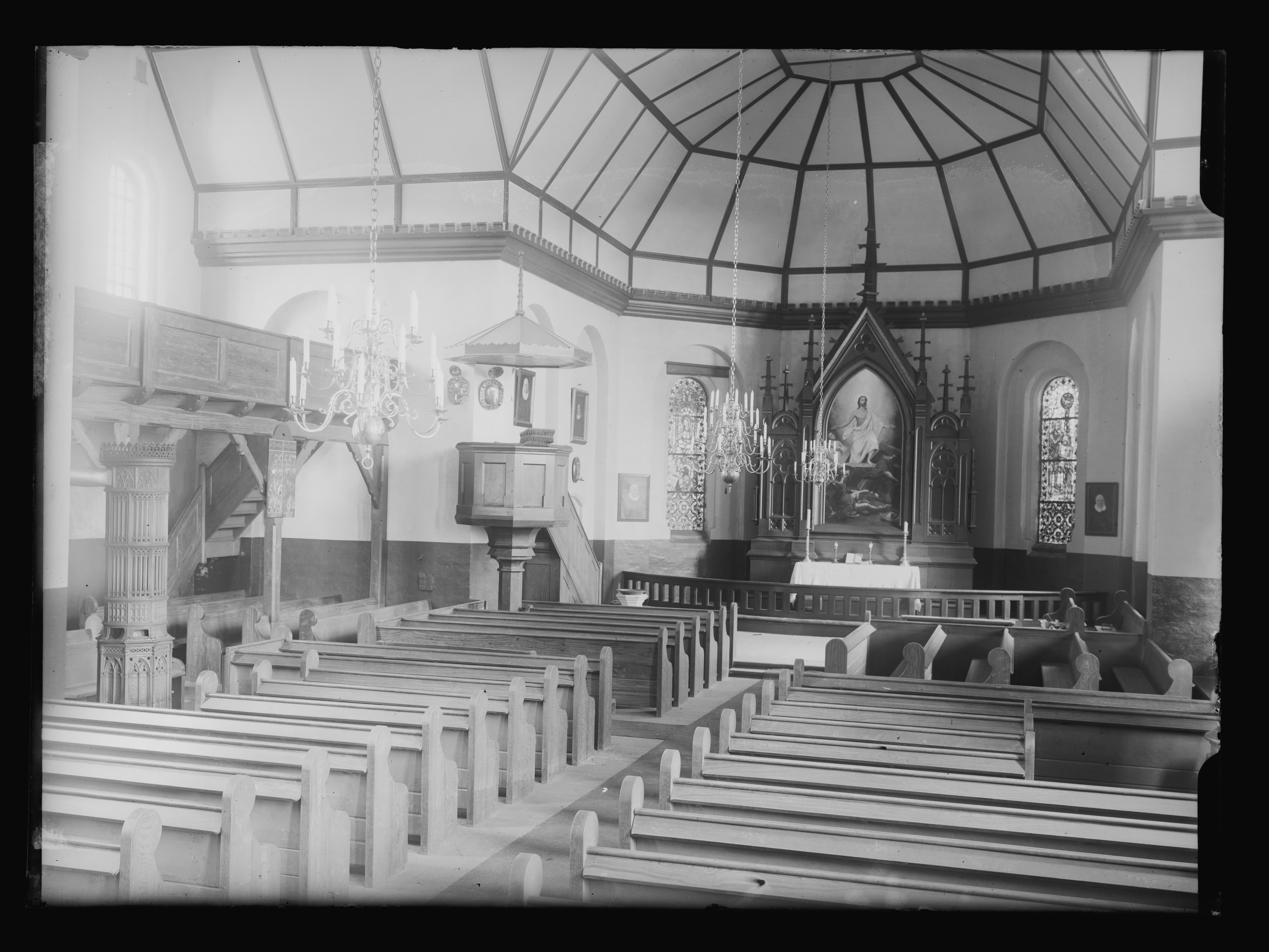

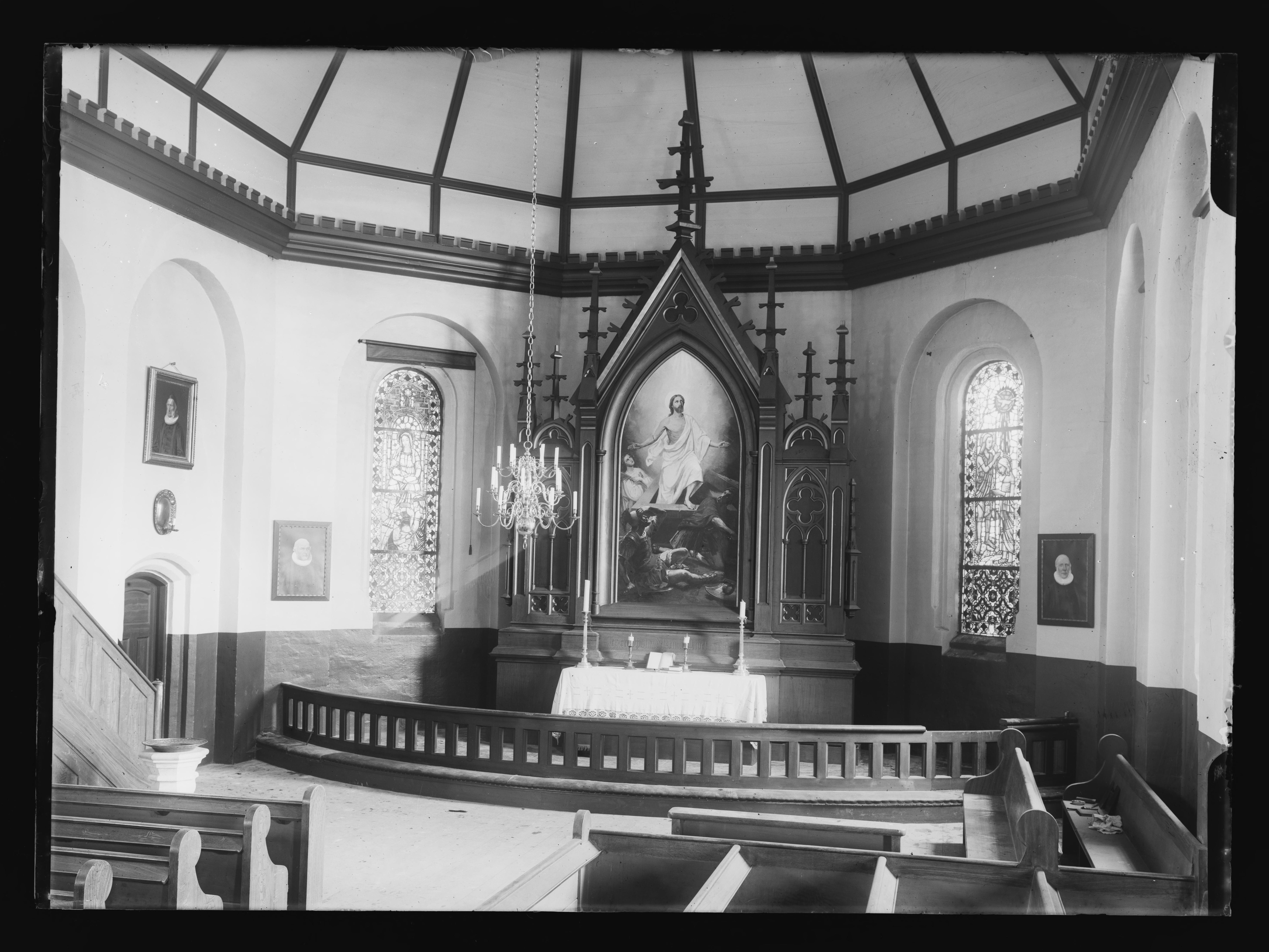

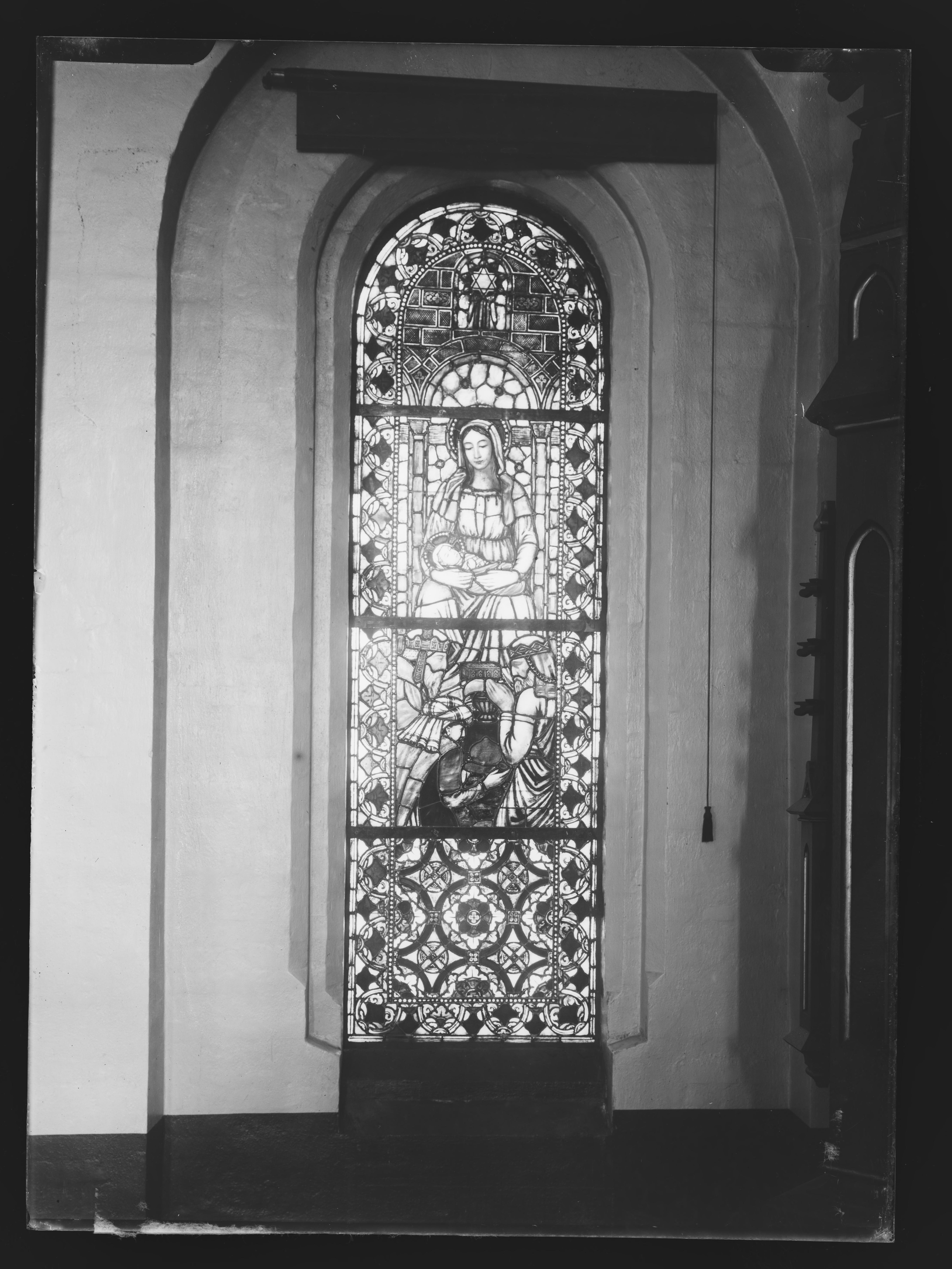

== See also ==
- List of churches in Hamar
