= Ullern Church =

Church in Innlandet, Norway

- Ullern kirke
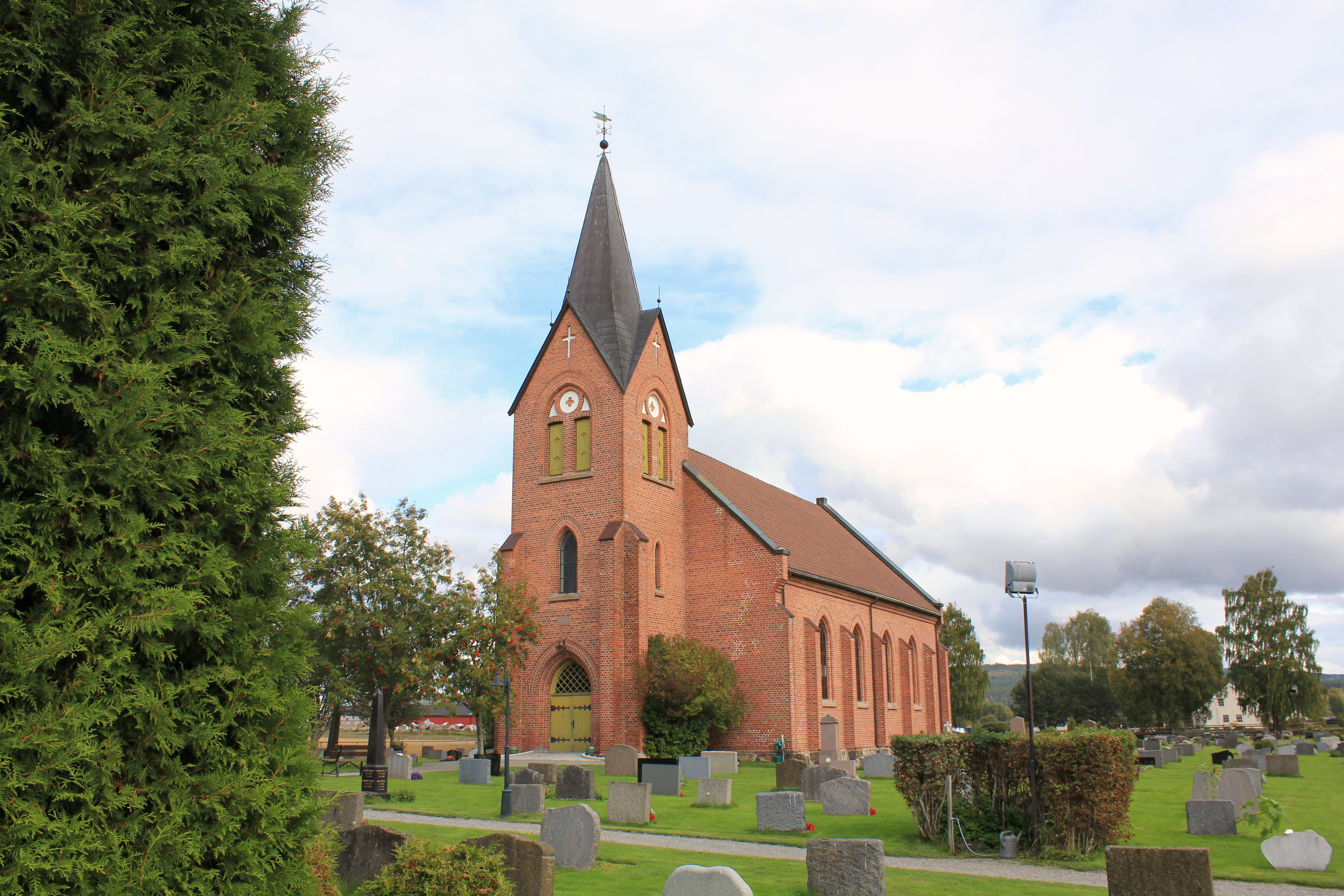
- View of the church Credit: Øyvind Holmstad
- Ullern Church
- 60°12′46″N 11°38′09″E
- Location: Sør-Odal Municipality, Innlandet
- Country: Norway
- Denomination: Church of Norway
- Previous denomination: Catholic Church
- Churchmanship: Evangelical Lutheran

History
- Status: Parish church
- Founded: 12th century
- Consecrated: 1869

Architecture
- Functional status: Active
- Architect: Jacob Wilhelm Nordan
- Architectural type: Long church
- Completed: 1869 (157 years ago)

Specifications
- Capacity: 250
- Materials: Brick

Administration
- Diocese: Hamar bispedømme
- Deanery: Solør, Vinger og Odal prosti
- Parish: Ullern
- Norwegian Cultural Heritage Site
- Type: Church
- Status: Protected
- ID: 85717

Ullern Church (Norwegian: Ullern kirke) is a parish church of the Church of Norway in Sør-Odal Municipality in Innlandet county, Norway. It is located in the village of Ullern. It is the church for the Ullern parish which is part of the Solør, Vinger og Odal prosti (deanery) in the Diocese of Hamar. The red brick church was built in a long church design in 1869 using plans drawn up by the architect Jacob Wilhelm Nordan. The church seats about 250 people.

== History ==
The earliest existing historical records of the church date back to the year 1394, but the church was not built that day. The first church at Ullern was a wooden stave church that was likely built during the 12th century. In 1623, the old church was torn down and replaced with a new building on the same site. In 1730, the church was torn down and replaced with a new building on the same site.

By the 1860s, the church was too small for the parish, so plans were again made to replace the church with a new building. The architect Jacob Wilhelm Nordan was hired to design the building and Halvor Christoffersen and Marcus Moss were hired as the lead builders for the project. The church was a neo-Gothic brick long church with seating for about 250 people. The church was completed and consecrated in 1869. In 1951, the church was restored and many historic pieces were found stored away in the attic such as an altarpiece from 1678, and a pulpit and baptismal font from 1680. These items were restored and placed in the church.

== Media gallery ==
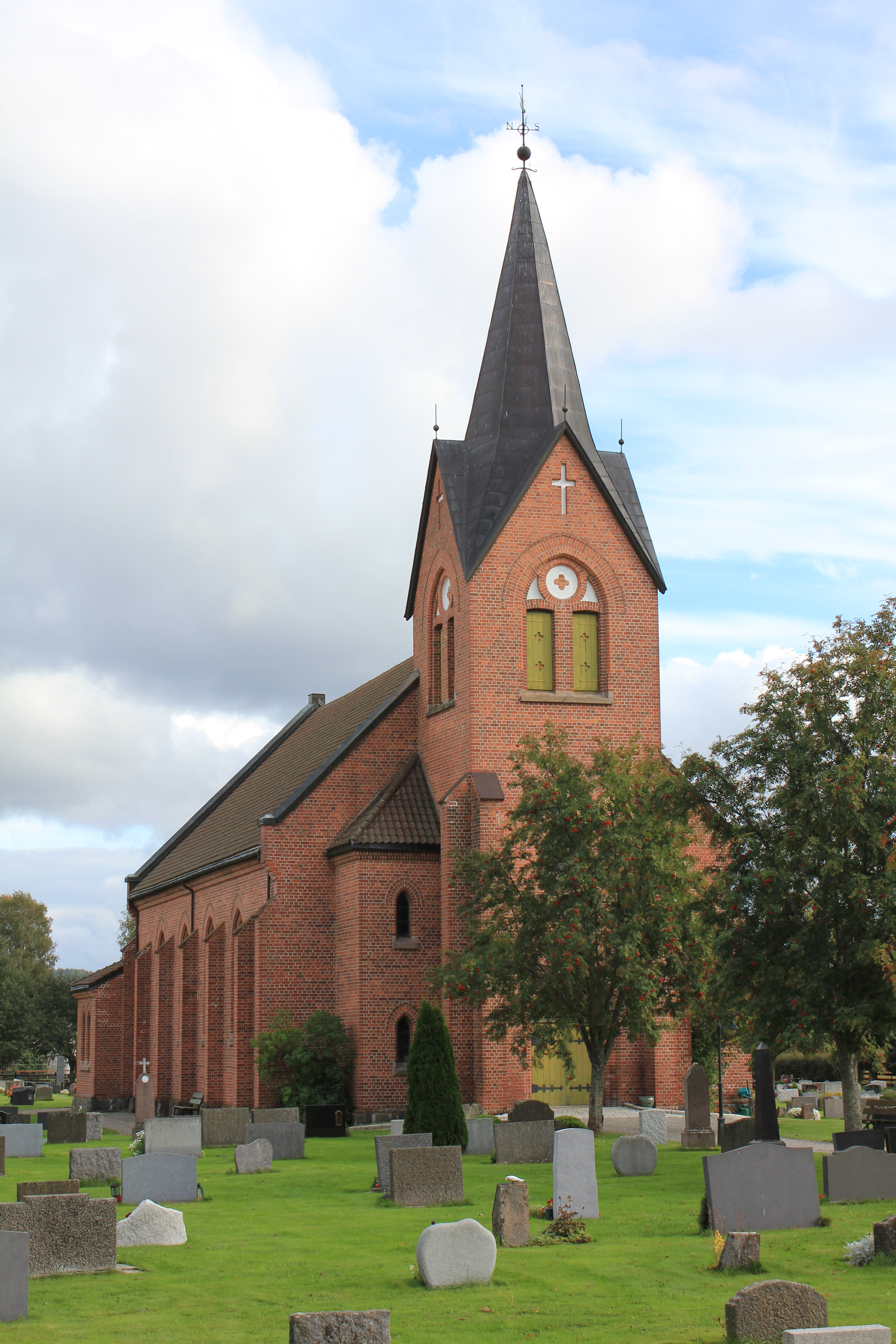

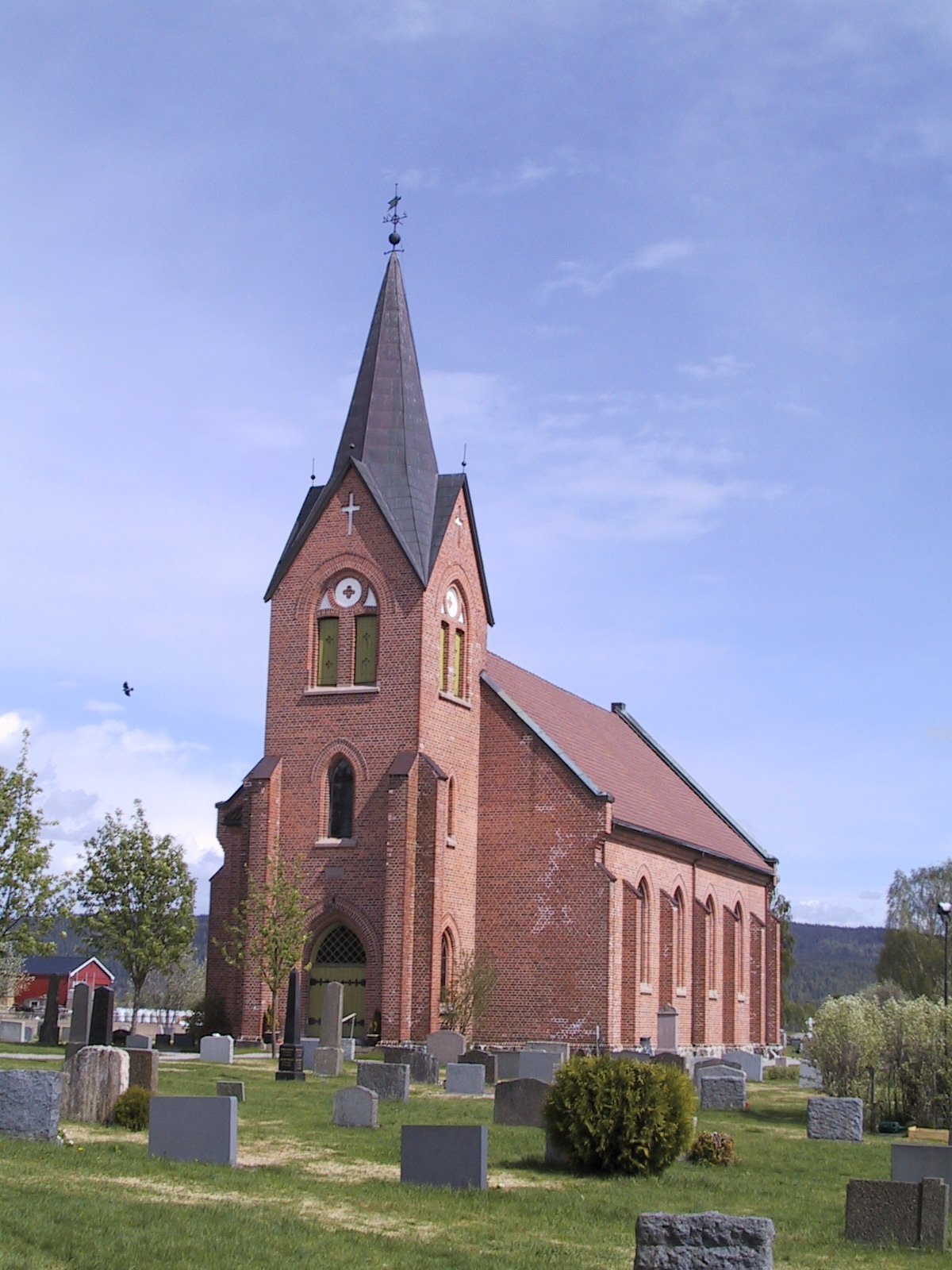

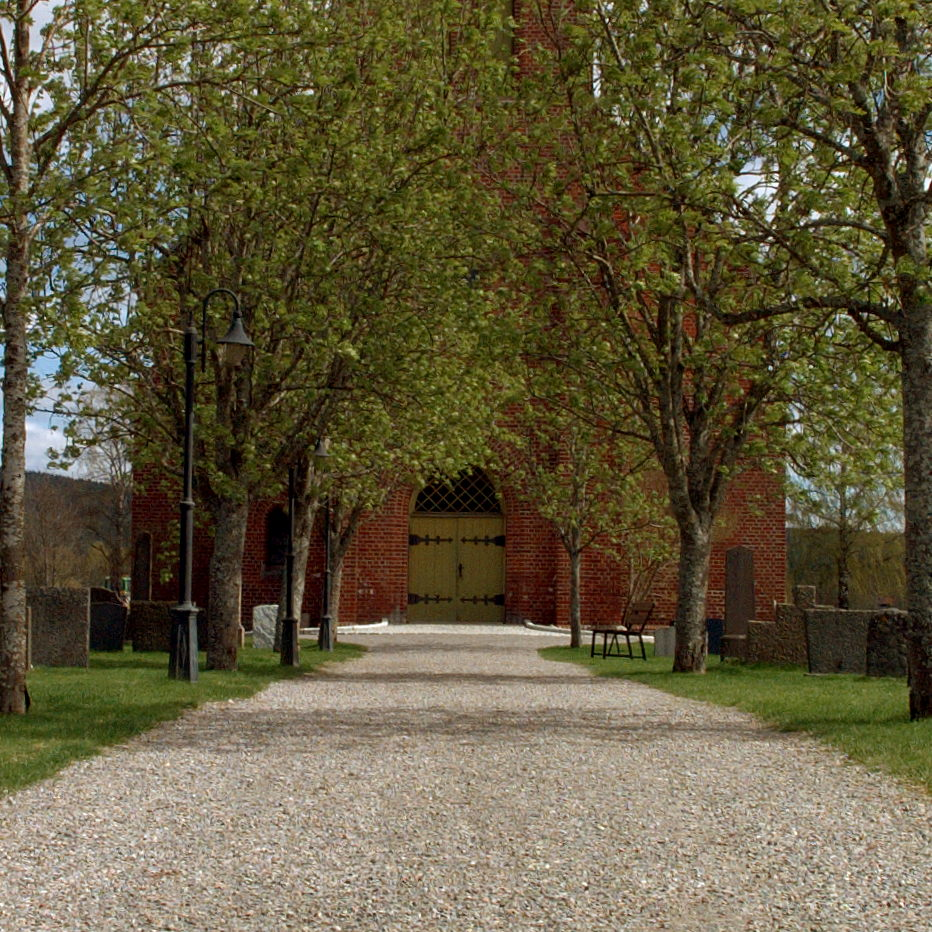

== See also ==
- List of churches in Hamar
