= Sør-Odal Municipality =

Municipality in Innlandet, Norway

Sør-Odal Municipality Sør-Odal kommune
- Municipality
- Søndre Odalen herred (historic name)
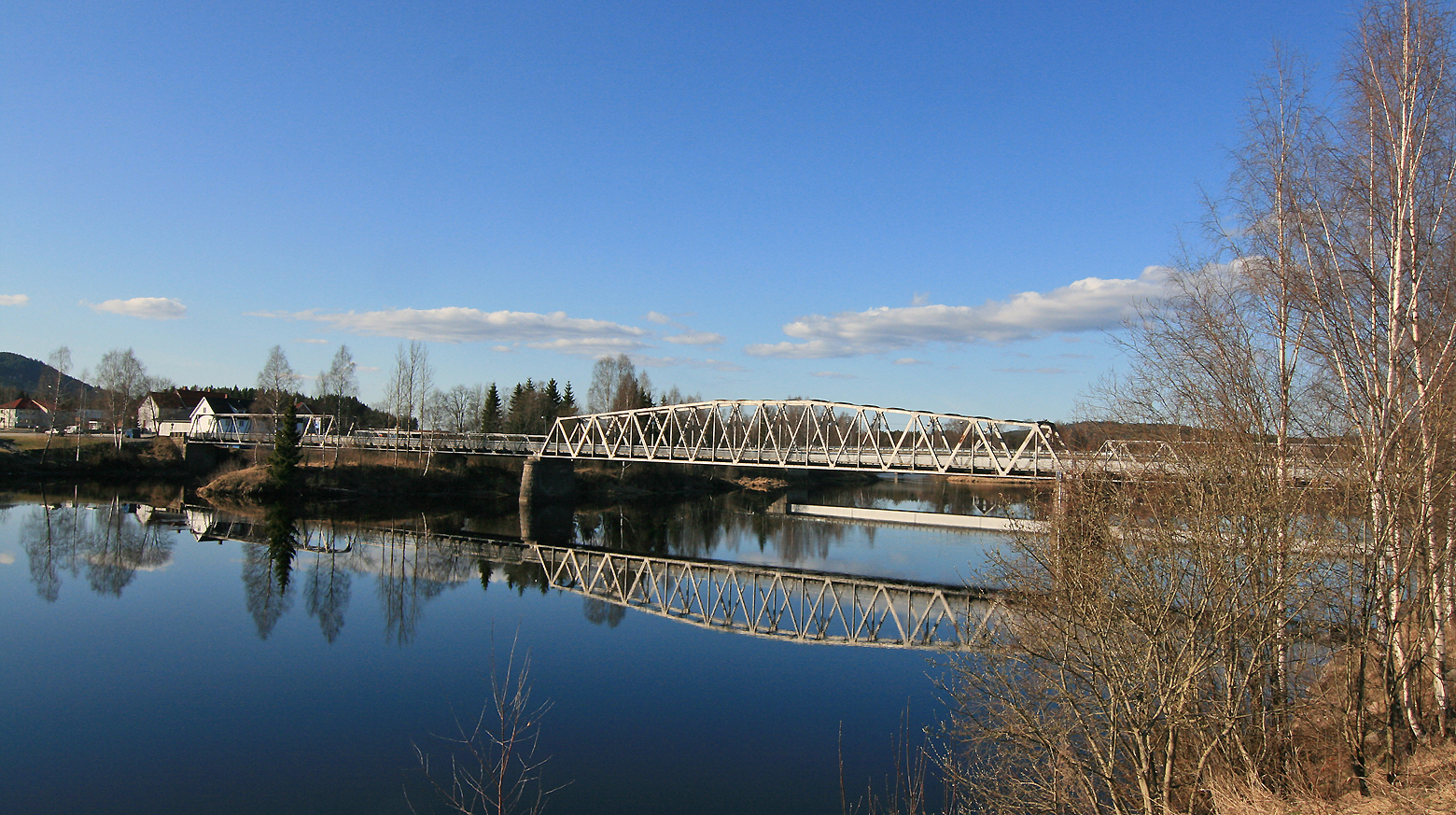
- View of bridge over the Glomma River in Skarnes

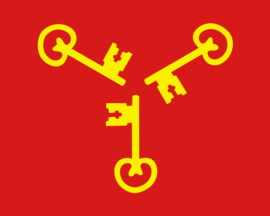
- Flag Coat of arms

- Innlandet within Norway

- Sør-Odal within Innlandet
- Coordinates: 60°14′12″N 11°44′44″E
- Country: Norway
- County: Innlandet
- District: Odalen
- Established: 1 Jan 1838
  - Created as: Formannskapsdistrikt
- Administrative centre: Skarnes

Government
  - Mayor (2016): Knut Hvithammer (Ap)

Area
  - Total: 516.74 km^{2} (199.51 sq mi)
  - Land: 479.04 km^{2} (184.96 sq mi)
  - Water: 37.70 km^{2} (14.56 sq mi) 7.3%
  - Rank: #206 in Norway
- Highest elevation: 528.85 m (1,735.1 ft)

Population (2025)
  - Total: 8,150
  - Rank: #132 in Norway
  - Density: 15.8/km^{2} (41/sq mi)
  - Change (10 years): ▲ +3.4%
- Demonym: sør-ødøling

Official language
  - Norwegian form: Bokmål
- Time zone: UTC+01:00 (CET)
  - Summer (DST): UTC+02:00 (CEST)
- ISO 3166 code: NO-3415
- Website: Official website

Sør-Odal is a municipality in Innlandet county, Norway. It is located in the traditional district of Odalen. The administrative centre of the municipality is the village of Skarnes. Other villages in Sør-Odal include Disenå, Galterud, and Sander.

The 517-square-kilometre (200 sq mi) municipality is the 206th largest by area out of the 357 municipalities in Norway. Sør-Odal Municipality is the 132nd most populous municipality in Norway with a population of 8,150. The municipality's population density is 15.8 inhabitants per square kilometre (41/sq mi) and its population has increased by 3.4% over the previous 10-year period.

== General information ==
The parish of Søndre Odalen was established as a municipality on 1 January 1838 (see formannskapsdistrikt law). The borders of the municipality have not changed since that time (which is fairly rare in Norway).

Historically, the municipality was part of the old Hedmark county. On 1 January 2020, the municipality became a part of the newly-formed Innlandet county (after Hedmark and Oppland counties were merged).

=== Name ===
The municipality was originally named Søndre Odalen (later Sør-Odal), after the valley in which it is located. The first element in the name is the word søndre or sør, both of which mean "southern". The last element of the name is the old district name Odalen (Old Norse: Ódalr). The first part of this is ǫ́ which is an alternate form of the word á which means "river" or "creek" (here it's referring to the Glåma river). The last part of this is dalr which means "valley" or "dale". The prefix "Søndre" was added when the old Odalen parish was divided in 1819 into Nordre Odalen in the north and Søndre Odalen in the south. On 3 November 1917, a royal resolution changed the spelling of the name of the municipality to Sør-Odal, using an alternate word for "south" and removing the definite form ending -en.

=== Coat of arms ===
The coat of arms was granted on 10 January 1992. The official blazon is "Gules, three keys Or in pall" (Norwegian: I rødt tre gull nøkler stilt i trepass). This means the arms have a red field (background) and the charge is three keys aligned in pall. The charge has a tincture of Or which means it is commonly colored yellow, but if it is made out of metal, then gold is used. The keys symbolize justice, knowledge, and positive ideals. The design was chosen to represent the three parishes of Oppstad, Strøm, and Ullern and the three local bodies of water: Glomma, Oppstadåa, and Storsjøen. The arms were designed by Harald Hallstensen, a graphical designer. The municipal flag has the same design as the coat of arms.

=== Churches ===
The Church of Norway has three parishes (sokn) within Sør-Odal Municipality. It is part of the Solør, Vinger og Odal prosti (deanery) in the Diocese of Hamar.

Churches in Sør-Odal
Parish (sokn)	Church name	Location of the church	Year built
Oppstad	Oppstad Church	Oppstad (north of Skarnes)	1725
Strøm	Strøm Church	Strøm (southeast of Skarnes)	1857
Ullern	Ullern Church	Ullern (southwest of Skarnes)	1868

== Geography ==
The municipality is a rural area in the Odalen valley that is located along the river Glåma and around the southern side of the lake Storsjøen. It is bordered by Eidskog Municipality to the south, by Kongsvinger Municipality to the east, by Nord-Odal Municipality and Grue Municipality to the north, and by Nes Municipality (in Akershus county) to the west. The terrain is dominated by rolling hills, lakes, and pine forests. The highest point in the municipality is the 528.85-metre (1,735.1 ft) tall mountain Granberget, not far from the border with Kongsvinger Municipality.

== Government ==
Sør-Odal Municipality is responsible for primary education (through 10th grade), outpatient health services, senior citizen services, welfare and other social services, zoning, economic development, and municipal roads and utilities. The municipality is governed by a municipal council of directly elected representatives. The mayor is indirectly elected by a vote of the municipal council. The municipality is under the jurisdiction of the Romerike og Glåmdal District Court and the Eidsivating Court of Appeal.

=== Municipal council ===
The municipal council (Kommunestyre) of Sør-Odal Municipality is made up of 27 representatives that are elected to four year terms. The tables below show the current and historical composition of the council by political party.

Sør-Odal kommunestyre 2023–2027
Party name (in Norwegian)	Number of representatives
Labour Party (Arbeiderpartiet)	6
Progress Party (Fremskrittspartiet)	2
Conservative Party (Høyre)	4
Industry and Business Party (Industri‑ og Næringspartiet)	2
Pensioners' Party (Pensjonistpartiet)	2
Red Party (Rødt)	2
Centre Party (Senterpartiet)	2
Socialist Left Party (Sosialistisk Venstreparti)	2
Liberal Party (Venstre)	2
Sør-Odal Local List (Sør-Odal Bygdeliste)	3
Total number of members:	27

Sør-Odal kommunestyre 2019–2023
Party name (in Norwegian)	Number of representatives
Labour Party (Arbeiderpartiet)	10
Progress Party (Fremskrittspartiet)	2
Conservative Party (Høyre)	4
Pensioners' Party (Pensjonistpartiet)	1
Red Party (Rødt)	1
Centre Party (Senterpartiet)	5
Socialist Left Party (Sosialistisk Venstreparti)	1
Sør-Odal Local list (Sør-Odal Bygdeliste)	3
Total number of members:	27

Sør-Odal kommunestyre 2015–2019
Party name (in Norwegian)	Number of representatives
Labour Party (Arbeiderpartiet)	11
Green Party (Miljøpartiet De Grønne)	1
Conservative Party (Høyre)	6
Pensioners' Party (Pensjonistpartiet)	1
Centre Party (Senterpartiet)	2
Socialist Left Party (Sosialistisk Venstreparti)	1
Sør-Odal Local list (Sør-Odal Bygdeliste)	5
Total number of members:	27

Sør-Odal kommunestyre 2011–2015
Party name (in Norwegian)	Number of representatives
Labour Party (Arbeiderpartiet)	10
Progress Party (Fremskrittspartiet)	2
Conservative Party (Høyre)	7
Pensioners' Party (Pensjonistpartiet)	2
Centre Party (Senterpartiet)	4
Socialist Left Party (Sosialistisk Venstreparti)	2
Total number of members:	27

Sør-Odal kommunestyre 2007–2011
Party name (in Norwegian)	Number of representatives
Labour Party (Arbeiderpartiet)	15
Progress Party (Fremskrittspartiet)	3
Conservative Party (Høyre)	2
Pensioners' Party (Pensjonistpartiet)	1
Centre Party (Senterpartiet)	5
Socialist Left Party (Sosialistisk Venstreparti)	1
Total number of members:	27

Sør-Odal kommunestyre 2003–2007
Party name (in Norwegian)	Number of representatives
Labour Party (Arbeiderpartiet)	17
Progress Party (Fremskrittspartiet)	2
Conservative Party (Høyre)	3
Centre Party (Senterpartiet)	3
Socialist Left Party (Sosialistisk Venstreparti)	2
Total number of members:	27

Sør-Odal kommunestyre 1999–2003
Party name (in Norwegian)	Number of representatives
Labour Party (Arbeiderpartiet)	17
Progress Party (Fremskrittspartiet)	2
Conservative Party (Høyre)	3
Centre Party (Senterpartiet)	3
Socialist Left Party (Sosialistisk Venstreparti)	2
Total number of members:	27

Sør-Odal kommunestyre 1995–1999
Party name (in Norwegian)	Number of representatives
Labour Party (Arbeiderpartiet)	12
Centre Party (Senterpartiet)	3
Socialist Left Party (Sosialistisk Venstreparti)	3
Sør-Odal local list (Sør-Odal bygdeliste)	7
Total number of members:	25

Sør-Odal kommunestyre 1991–1995
Party name (in Norwegian)	Number of representatives
Labour Party (Arbeiderpartiet)	19
Conservative Party (Høyre)	2
Centre Party (Senterpartiet)	3
Socialist Left Party (Sosialistisk Venstreparti)	4
Cross-party local list (Tverrpolitisk Bygdeliste)	5
Total number of members:	33

Sør-Odal kommunestyre 1987–1991
Party name (in Norwegian)	Number of representatives
Labour Party (Arbeiderpartiet)	22
Conservative Party (Høyre)	4
Red Electoral Alliance (Rød Valgallianse)	2
Centre Party (Senterpartiet)	3
Socialist Left Party (Sosialistisk Venstreparti)	2
Total number of members:	33

Sør-Odal kommunestyre 1983–1987
Party name (in Norwegian)	Number of representatives
Labour Party (Arbeiderpartiet)	24
Conservative Party (Høyre)	4
Centre Party (Senterpartiet)	3
Socialist Left Party (Sosialistisk Venstreparti)	2
Total number of members:	33

Sør-Odal kommunestyre 1979–1983
Party name (in Norwegian)	Number of representatives
Labour Party (Arbeiderpartiet)	22
Conservative Party (Høyre)	4
Christian Democratic Party (Kristelig Folkeparti)	1
Centre Party (Senterpartiet)	4
Socialist Left Party (Sosialistisk Venstreparti)	2
Total number of members:	33

Sør-Odal kommunestyre 1975–1979
Party name (in Norwegian)	Number of representatives
Labour Party (Arbeiderpartiet)	22
Conservative Party (Høyre)	2
Christian Democratic Party (Kristelig Folkeparti)	1
Centre Party (Senterpartiet)	5
Socialist Left Party (Sosialistisk Venstreparti)	3
Total number of members:	33

Sør-Odal kommunestyre 1971–1975
Party name (in Norwegian)	Number of representatives
Labour Party (Arbeiderpartiet)	24
Conservative Party (Høyre)	1
Communist Party (Kommunistiske Parti)	1
Christian Democratic Party (Kristelig Folkeparti)	1
Centre Party (Senterpartiet)	5
Socialist People's Party (Sosialistisk Folkeparti)	1
Total number of members:	33

Sør-Odal kommunestyre 1967–1971
Party name (in Norwegian)	Number of representatives
Labour Party (Arbeiderpartiet)	24
Conservative Party (Høyre)	2
Communist Party (Kommunistiske Parti)	1
Centre Party (Senterpartiet)	4
Socialist People's Party (Sosialistisk Folkeparti)	2
Total number of members:	33

Sør-Odal kommunestyre 1963–1967
Party name (in Norwegian)	Number of representatives
Labour Party (Arbeiderpartiet)	23
Conservative Party (Høyre)	3
Communist Party (Kommunistiske Parti)	2
Christian Democratic Party (Kristelig Folkeparti)	1
Centre Party (Senterpartiet)	4
Total number of members:	33

Sør-Odal herredsstyre 1959–1963
Party name (in Norwegian)	Number of representatives
Labour Party (Arbeiderpartiet)	22
Conservative Party (Høyre)	2
Communist Party (Kommunistiske Parti)	3
Christian Democratic Party (Kristelig Folkeparti)	2
Centre Party (Senterpartiet)	4
Total number of members:	33

Sør-Odal herredsstyre 1955–1959
Party name (in Norwegian)	Number of representatives
Labour Party (Arbeiderpartiet)	22
Conservative Party (Høyre)	2
Communist Party (Kommunistiske Parti)	3
Christian Democratic Party (Kristelig Folkeparti)	2
Farmers' Party (Bondepartiet)	4
Total number of members:	33

Sør-Odal herredsstyre 1951–1955
Party name (in Norwegian)	Number of representatives
Labour Party (Arbeiderpartiet)	21
Conservative Party (Høyre)	1
Communist Party (Kommunistiske Parti)	5
Christian Democratic Party (Kristelig Folkeparti)	1
Farmers' Party (Bondepartiet)	4
Total number of members:	32

Sør-Odal herredsstyre 1947–1951
Party name (in Norwegian)	Number of representatives
Labour Party (Arbeiderpartiet)	21
Communist Party (Kommunistiske Parti)	6
Christian Democratic Party (Kristelig Folkeparti)	1
Farmers' Party (Bondepartiet)	3
Joint List(s) of Non-Socialist Parties (Borgerlige Felleslister)	1
Total number of members:	32

Sør-Odal herredsstyre 1945–1947
Party name (in Norwegian)	Number of representatives
Labour Party (Arbeiderpartiet)	21
Communist Party (Kommunistiske Parti)	7
Joint List(s) of Non-Socialist Parties (Borgerlige Felleslister)	4
Total number of members:	32

Sør-Odal herredsstyre 1937–1941*
Party name (in Norwegian)	Number of representatives
Labour Party (Arbeiderpartiet)	25
Conservative Party (Høyre)	1
Farmers' Party (Bondepartiet)	3
Liberal Party (Venstre)	1
Joint List(s) of Non-Socialist Parties (Borgerlige Felleslister)	2
Total number of members:	32
Note: Due to the German occupation of Norway during World War II, no elections were held for new municipal councils until after the war ended in 1945.

=== Mayors ===
The mayor (Norwegian: ordfører) of Sør-Odal Municipality is the political leader of the municipality and the chairperson of the municipal council. Here is a list of people who have held this position:

- 1838–1839: Ole Olsen Dysterud
- 1840–1841: Rev. Brockmann
- 1842–1845: Ole Olsen Dysterud
- 1846–1849: John Bredesen
- 1850–1851: Ole Hansen Hernæs
- 1852–1855: B. Bredesen
- 1856–1861: H.C. Andersen
- 1862–1863: T. Schøyen
- 1864–1865: A. Moss
- 1866–1869: Hans Olsen Brustad
- 1870–1873: Sjønne Sjønnesen
- 1874–1875: A. Sæter
- 1876–1885: Hans Olsen Brustad
- 1886–1887: Nils Hagen
- 1888–1891: Karl Olsen Glomsaas
- 1892–1895: Hans Olsen Brustad
- 1896–1898: Anton Moss
- 1899–1904: Th. O. Herud
- 1904–1910: Gunnar Haug
- 1910–1916: A. Strøm
- 1917–1919: Ole Aas
- 1919–1925: Anund Bergen
- 1925–1928: Johan Jachwitz (Ap)
- 1928–1929: Emil Gundersen (Ap)
- 1929–1931: Marius Engebretsen (Ap)
- 1931–1941: Trond Livden (Ap)
- 1941–1941: Olav Thorshaug (NS)
- 1941–1945: Lars Gjersøyen (NS)
- 1945–1945: Petter Hernes (Ap)
- 1946–1958: Karl Bergen (Ap)
- 1958–1975: Arne Broen
- 1975–2007: Henning Ragnar Myrvang (Ap)
- 2007–2011: Knut Hvithammer (Ap)
- 2011–2015: Anne-Mette Øvrum (H)
- 2015–present: Knut Hvithammer (Ap)

== Economy ==
Number of minorities (1st and 2nd generation) in Sør-Odal by country of origin in 2017
Ancestry	Number
Poland	101
Sweden	49
Thailand	46
Eritrea	45
Lithuania	37
Germany	37
Romania	34
Denmark	22

The economy is based on a mix of manufacturing, farming, and services. Skarnes has a train connection to Oslo via the Kongsvingerbanen railway line.

== Notable people ==
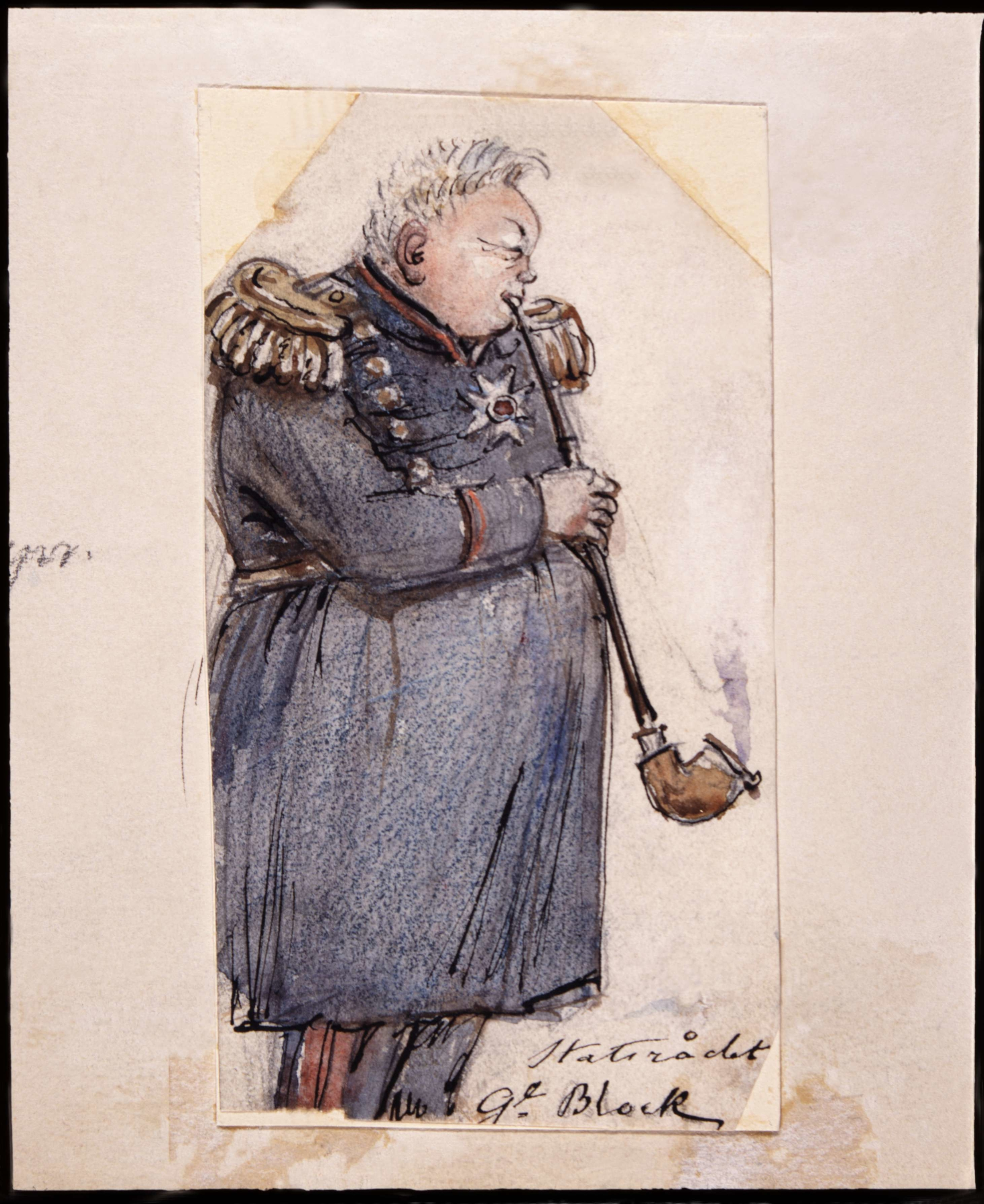
Hans Glad Bloch

- Hans Glad Bloch (1791 in Sør-Odal – 1865), a Norwegian military officer and government official
- Peder Sather (1810 in Odal – 1886), an American banker and philanthropist; eponym of the Sather Tower & Sather Gate at UC Berkeley
- Magnhild Haalke (1885–1984), a novelist and teacher for 30 years in Sør-Odal
- Kåre Tveter (1922 in Sør-Odal – 2012), a painter and illustrator
- Ole A. Stang Jr. (1923 in Sør-Odal – 1998), a businessman who owned and ran Maarud AS
- Øystein Sunde (born 1947), a folk singer, guitarist, and songwriter who was brought up in Skarnes
- Martin Linnes (born 1991 in Sander), a footballer with over 240 club caps and 27 for Norway
- Kent Håvard Eriksen (born 1991 in Skarnes), a footballer with over 250 club caps
- Magnus Gullerud (born 1991 in Skarnes), a handball player for Kolstad Håndball and the Norwegian national team.
- Henrik Christian Rørholt (1883–1954), a Norwegian military officer and politician for the Agrarian Party

== Sister cities ==
Sør-Odal has sister city agreements with the following places:

- Viitasaari, Länsi-Suomi, Finland

== Media gallery ==
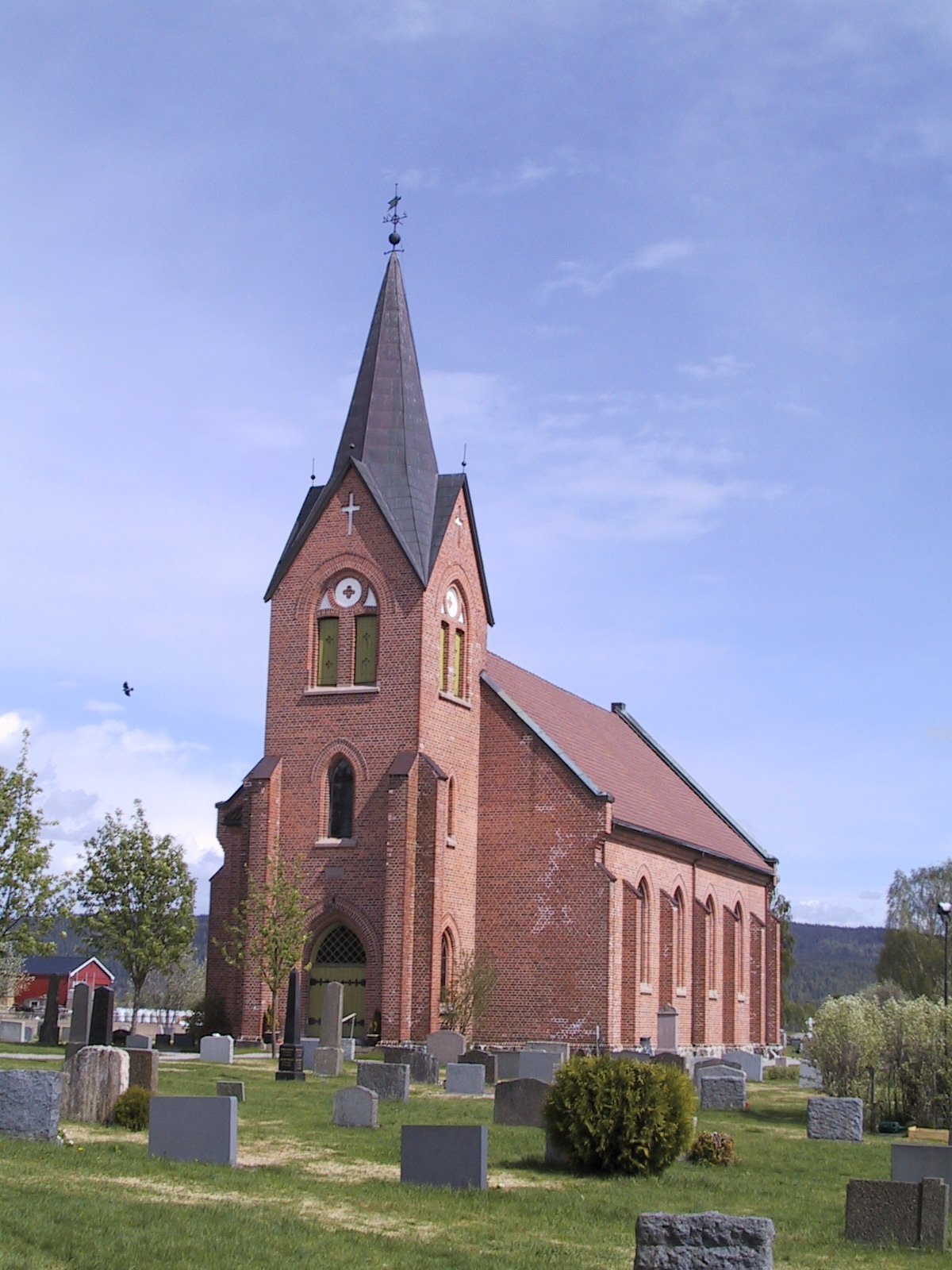
Ullern Church

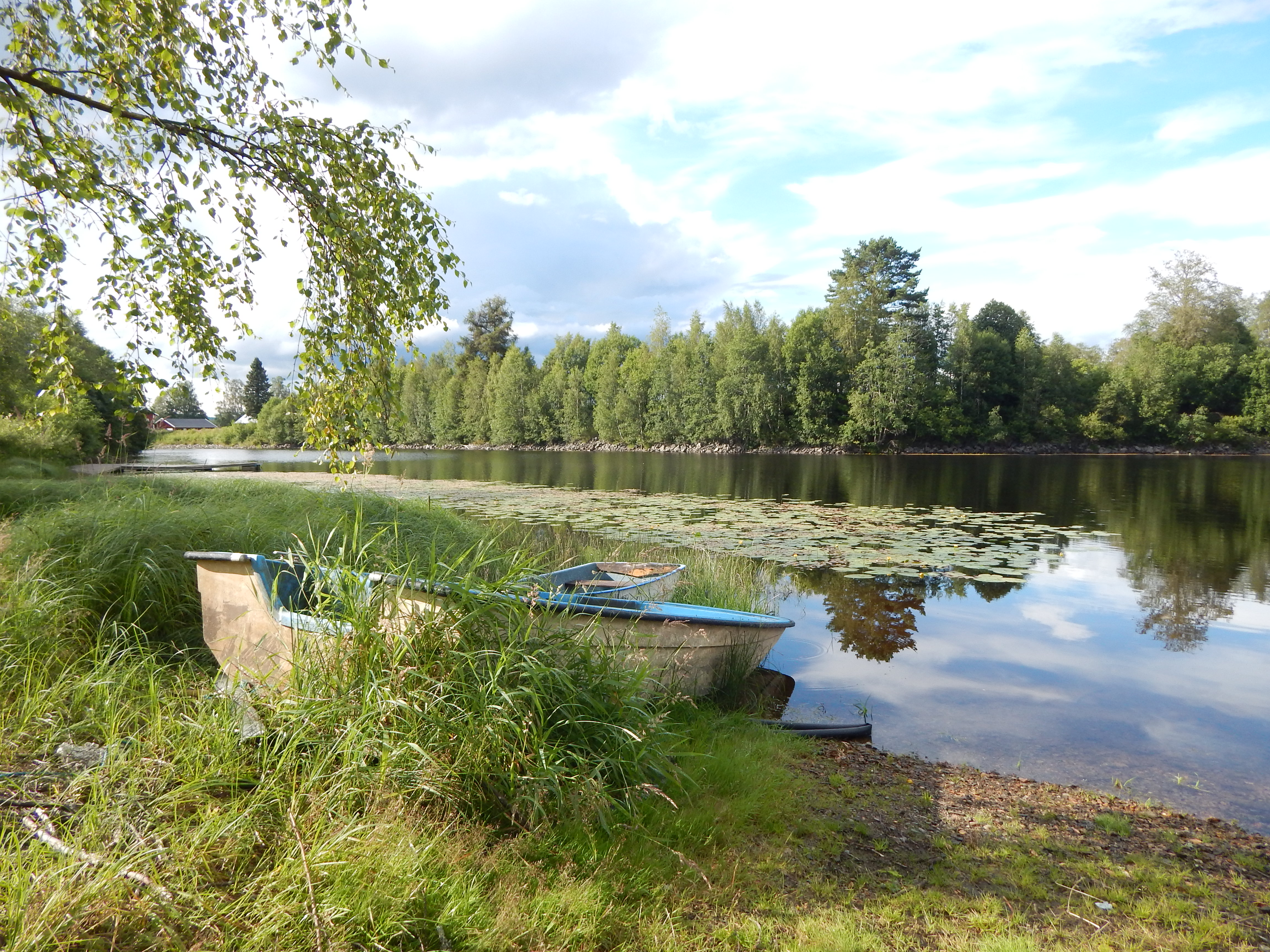
River Oppstadåa, Sør-Odal

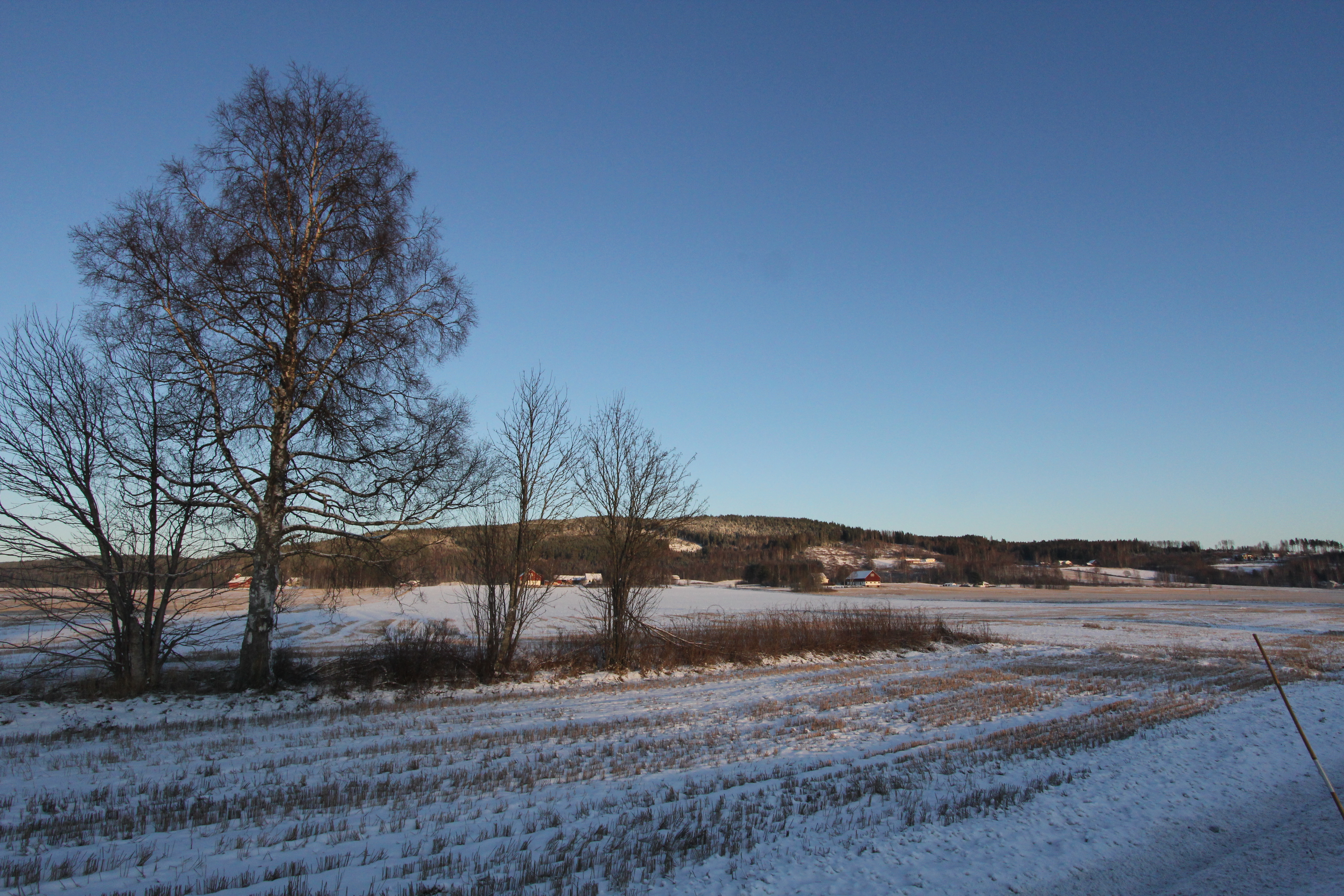
Sør-Odal

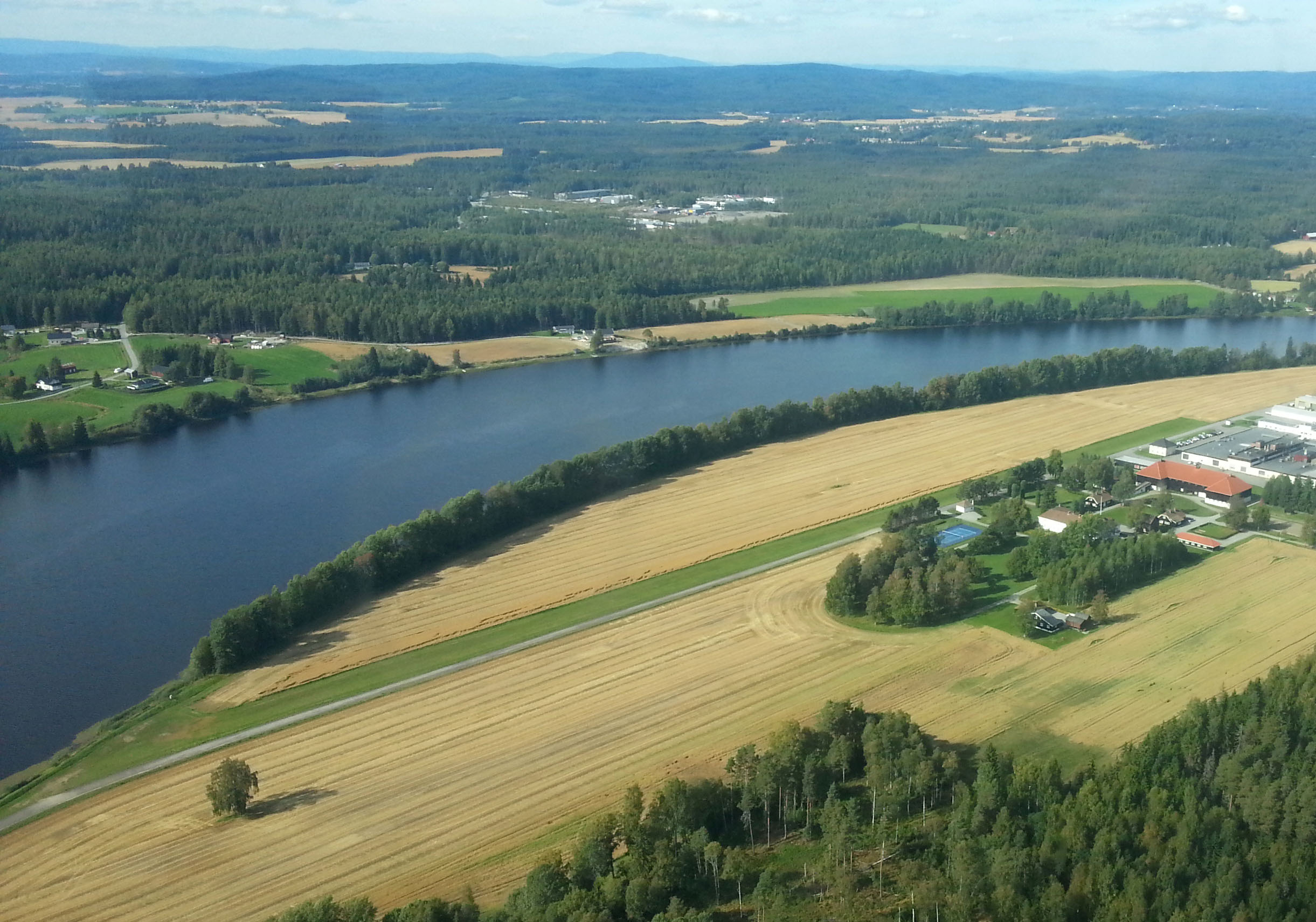
Maarud Airport
