= Kåre Tveter =

Norwegian painter and illustrator (1922–2012)

Kåre Tveter (25 January 1922 – 21 March 2012) was a Norwegian painter and illustrator.

He was born in Sør-Odal Municipality. His breakthrough as artist came in 1965. He is represented at various galleries, including the National Gallery of Norway and the Henie-Onstad Art Centre. He was decorated Knight, First Class of the Order of St. Olav in 1999.
