= Oppstad Church =

Church in Innlandet, Norway

- Oppstad kirke
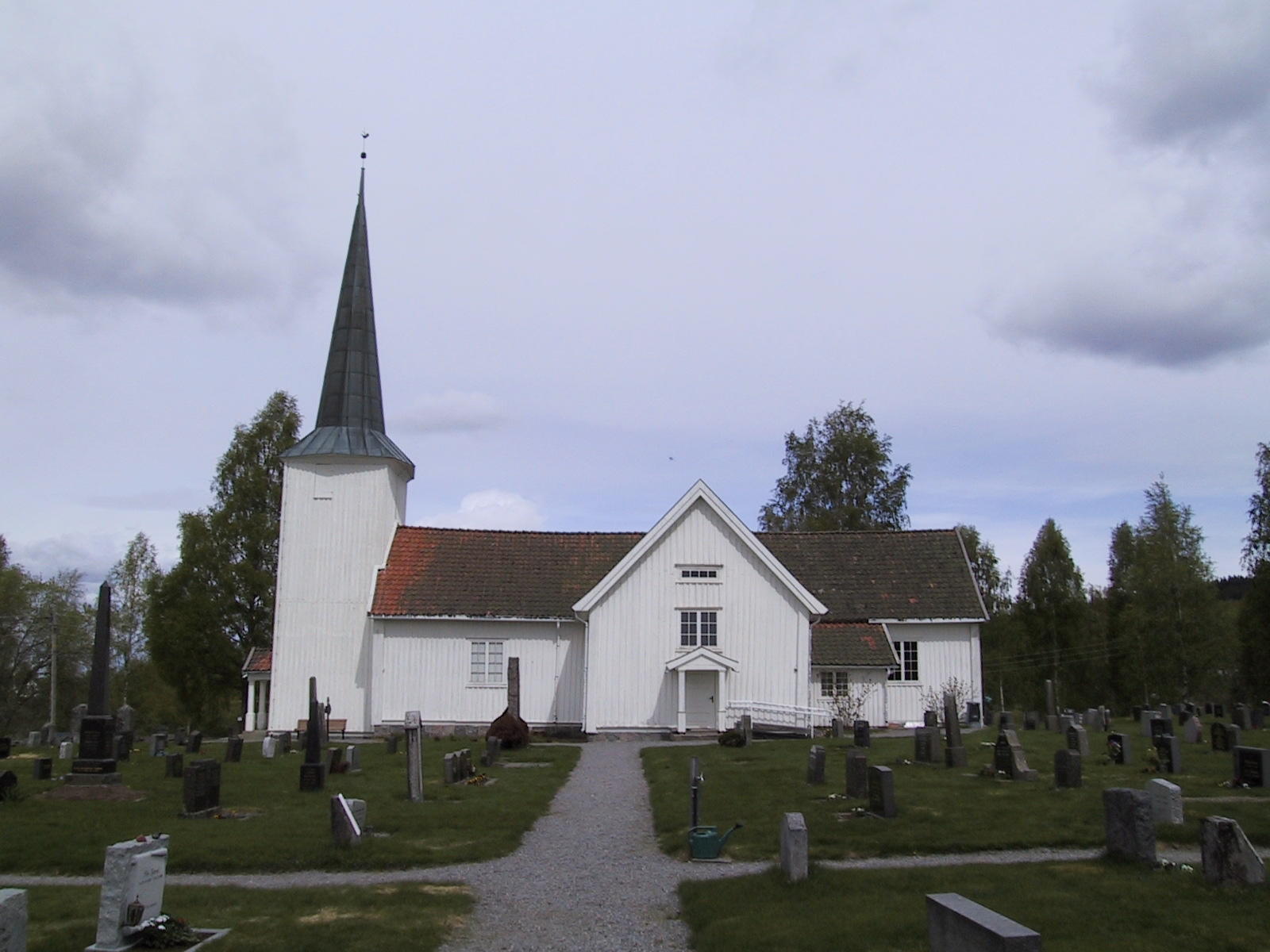
- View of the church
- Oppstad Church
- 60°17′15″N 11°40′11″E
- Location: Sør-Odal Municipality, Innlandet
- Country: Norway
- Denomination: Church of Norway
- Previous denomination: Catholic Church
- Churchmanship: Evangelical Lutheran

History
- Status: Parish church
- Founded: 13th century
- Consecrated: 1725

Architecture
- Functional status: Active
- Architectural type: Cruciform
- Completed: 1725 (301 years ago)

Specifications
- Capacity: 200
- Materials: Wood

Administration
- Diocese: Hamar bispedømme
- Deanery: Solør, Vinger og Odal prosti
- Parish: Oppstad
- Norwegian Cultural Heritage Site
- Type: Church
- Status: Automatically protected
- ID: 85230

Oppstad Church (Norwegian: Oppstad kirke) is a parish church of the Church of Norway in Sør-Odal Municipality in Innlandet county, Norway. It is located in the village of Oppstad. It is the church for the Oppstad parish which is part of the Solør, Vinger og Odal prosti (deanery) in the Diocese of Hamar. The white, wooden church was built in a cruciform design in 1725 using plans drawn up by an unknown architect. The church seats about 200 people.

== History ==
The earliest existing historical records of the church date back to the year 1394, but the church was not new that year. The first church in Oppstad was a small, wooden stave church that was likely built during the 13th century. This church was dedicated to St. Hallvard. Not much is known about this building. By the early 1600s, the old church was quite dilapidated and it was decided to replace the building. In 1634, the old church was torn down and a new church building was constructed on the same site. The new church was a timber-framed cruciform building. At some point there was a fire in the church, but it was repaired. By the time the church was about 90 years old, it was in very poor condition, so it was decided to replace the building. In 1725, the tower from the 1634 building was saved, but the rest of the old church was torn down. A new timber-framed cruciform building with about 200 seats. The choir and sacristy are in the eastern wing of the church and there is a church porch with the old tower above it attached to the western wing. The new church was consecrated in 1725. In the 1780s, it was found that the tower was leaning to the east, and it had to be repaired. The church was extensively restored in 1875 under the leadership of Günther Schüssler. The interior walls were paneled, covering up the log walls. The church got a neo-Gothic feel as old furniture was replaced. In the 1930s, the interior was restored to its original appearance, the wall paneling was removed and old furniture was used again.

== Media gallery ==
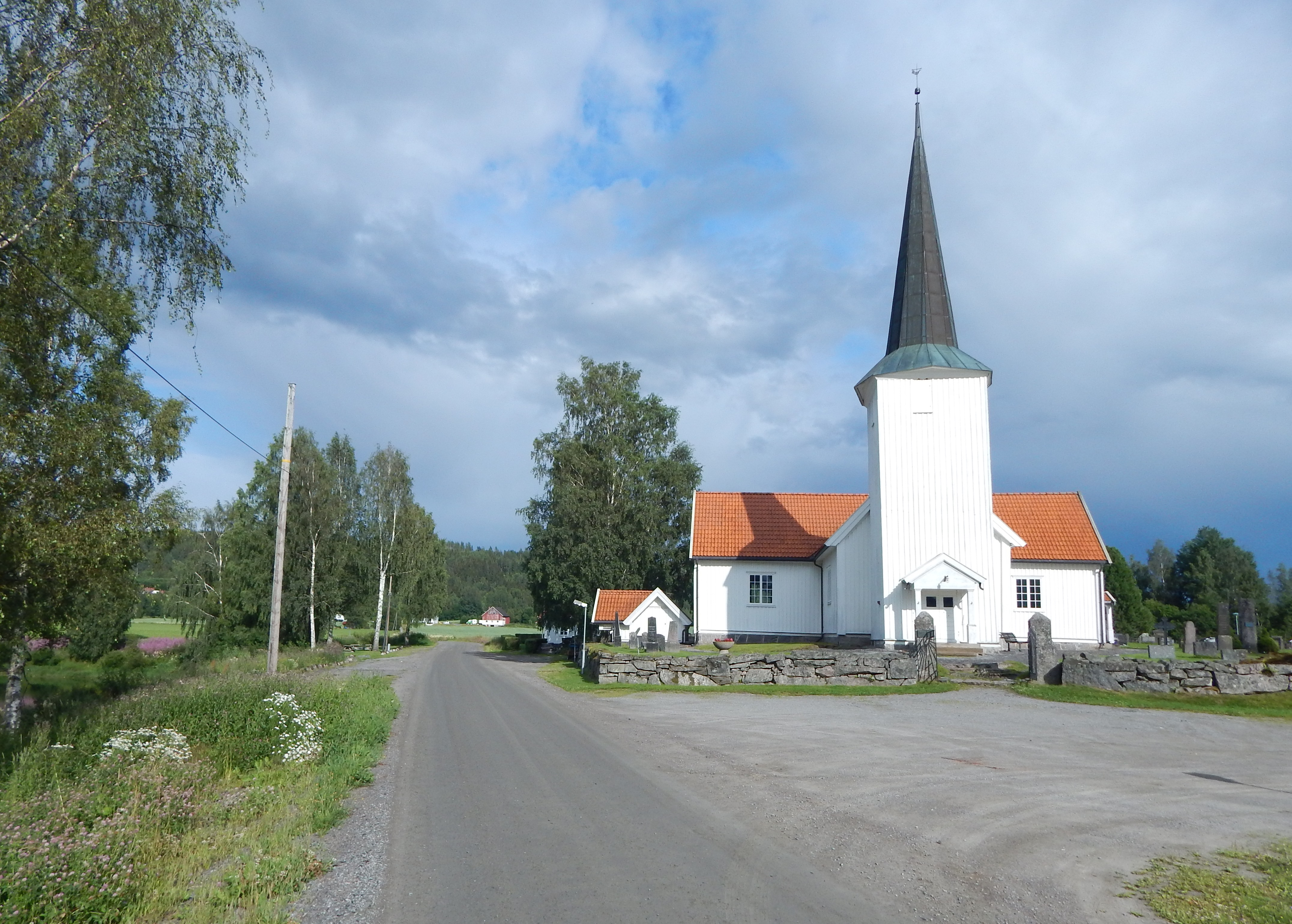
View of the front of the church
Credit: Jan-Tore Egge

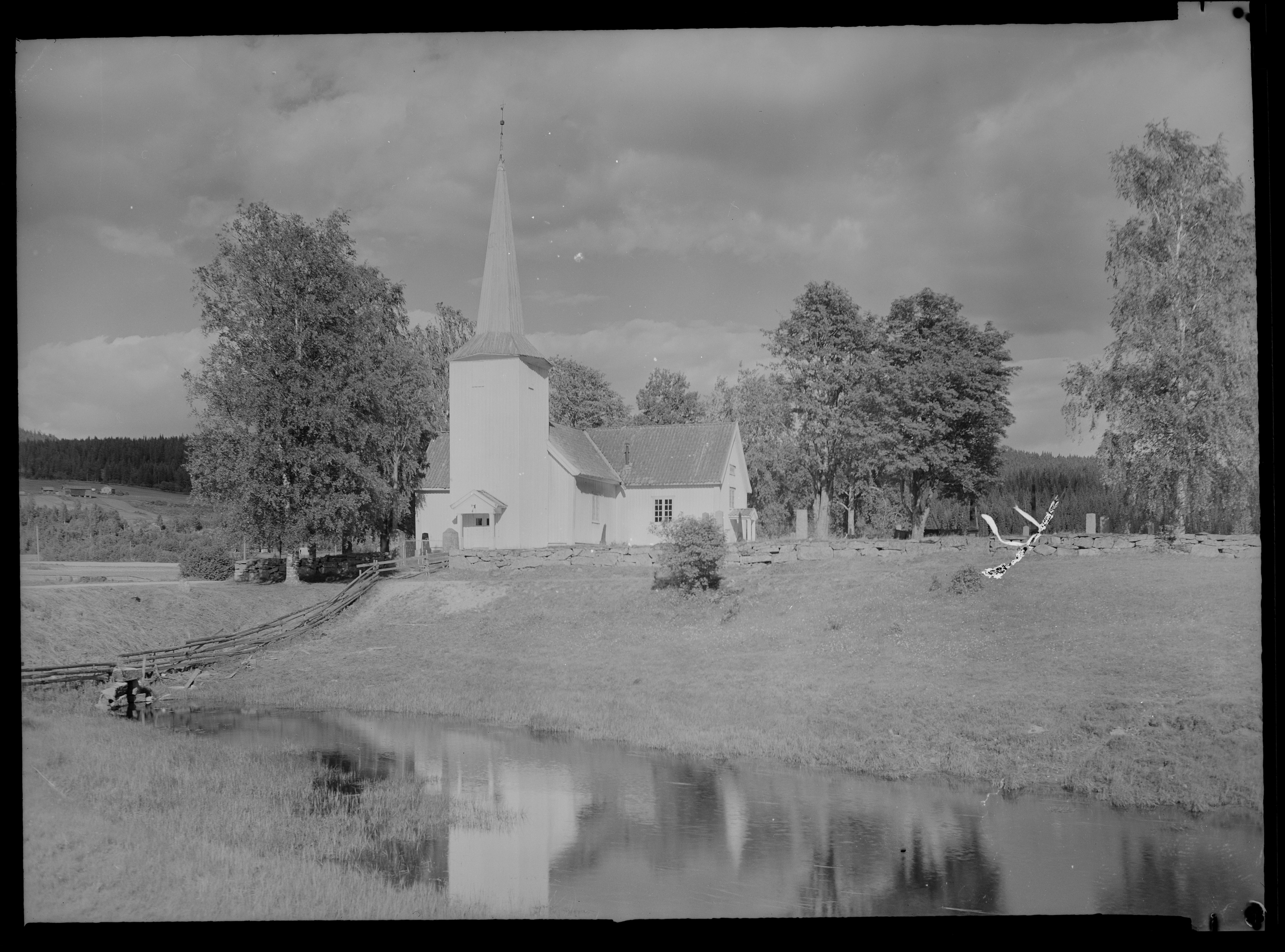
View of the church (c. 1950)

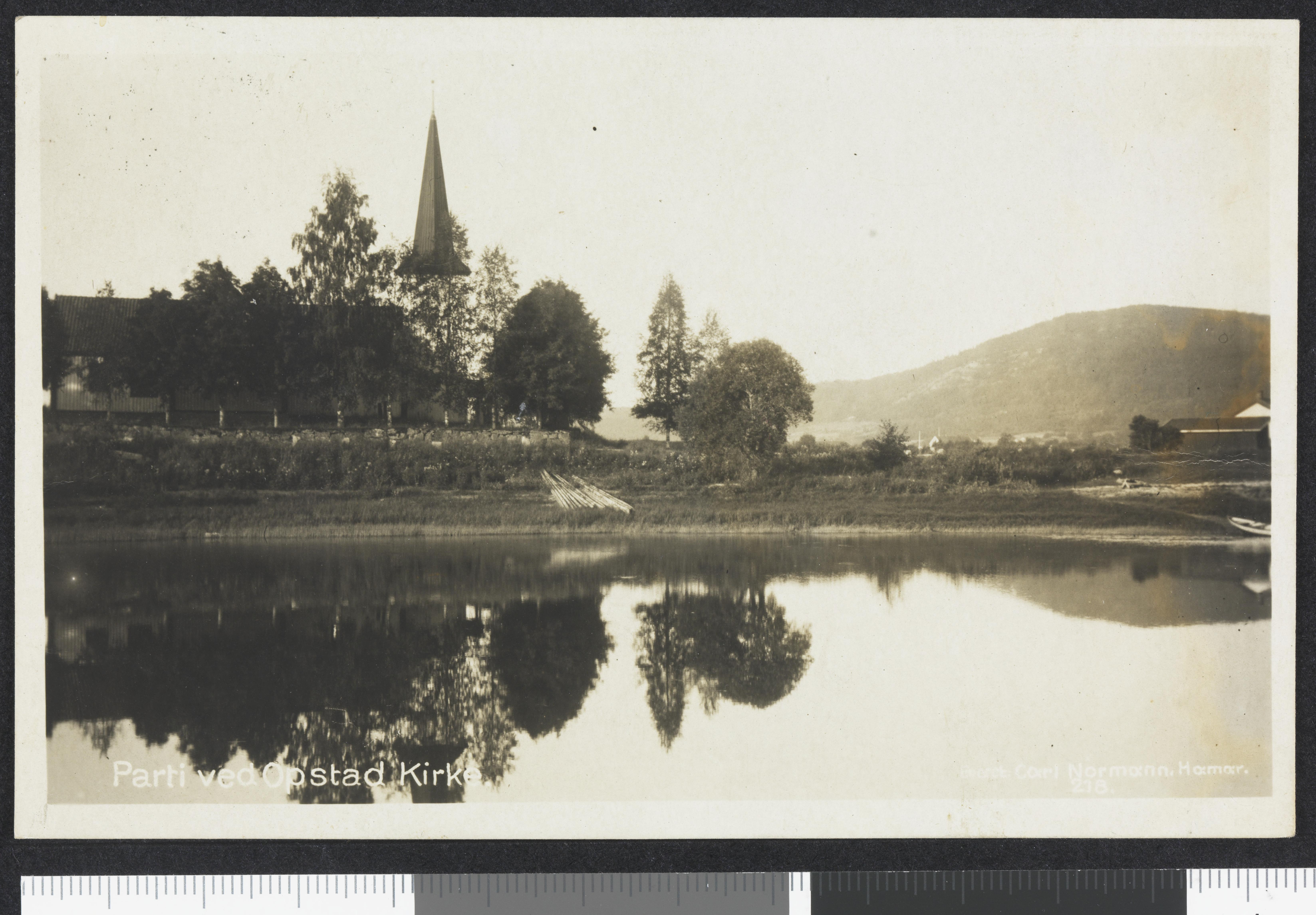
View of the church (c. 1915)

== See also ==
- List of churches in Hamar
