= Borghild Bondevik Haga =

Norwegian politician (1906–1990)

Borghild Bondevik Haga (8 December 1906 – 12 April 1990) was a Norwegian politician for the Liberal Party.

She was born in Østre Moland Municipality as a daughter of teacher Nils Bondevik (1874–1961) and Kari Hauge (1867–1958). She was a sister of Ottar and Gunnar Bondevik, first cousin of Johannes and Kjell Bondevik, and through that part of the family a first cousin once removed of Odd and Kjell Magne Bondevik.

She finished her secondary education in 1929. After a period as secretary for the YWCA in Kristiansand she became a farmer's wife in 1935. Haga was a member of the municipal council of Brunlanes Municipality from 1959 to 1965. She has been a member of the school board from 1940 to 1954 (chairing it the last four years) and the county school board from 1968 to 1975 (chairing it the last three years).

She was elected to the Parliament of Norway from Vestfold in 1965. She served as a member of the Standing Committee on Agriculture and the Election Committee, but was not re-elected in 1969.

She chaired Norges Husflidslag from 1968 to 1974. She also held regional board memberships in the YWCA, the Norges Bondekvinnelag and the Norwegian Missionary Society.
