= Nerdrum Station =

Railway halt in Fet, Norway

Nerdrum
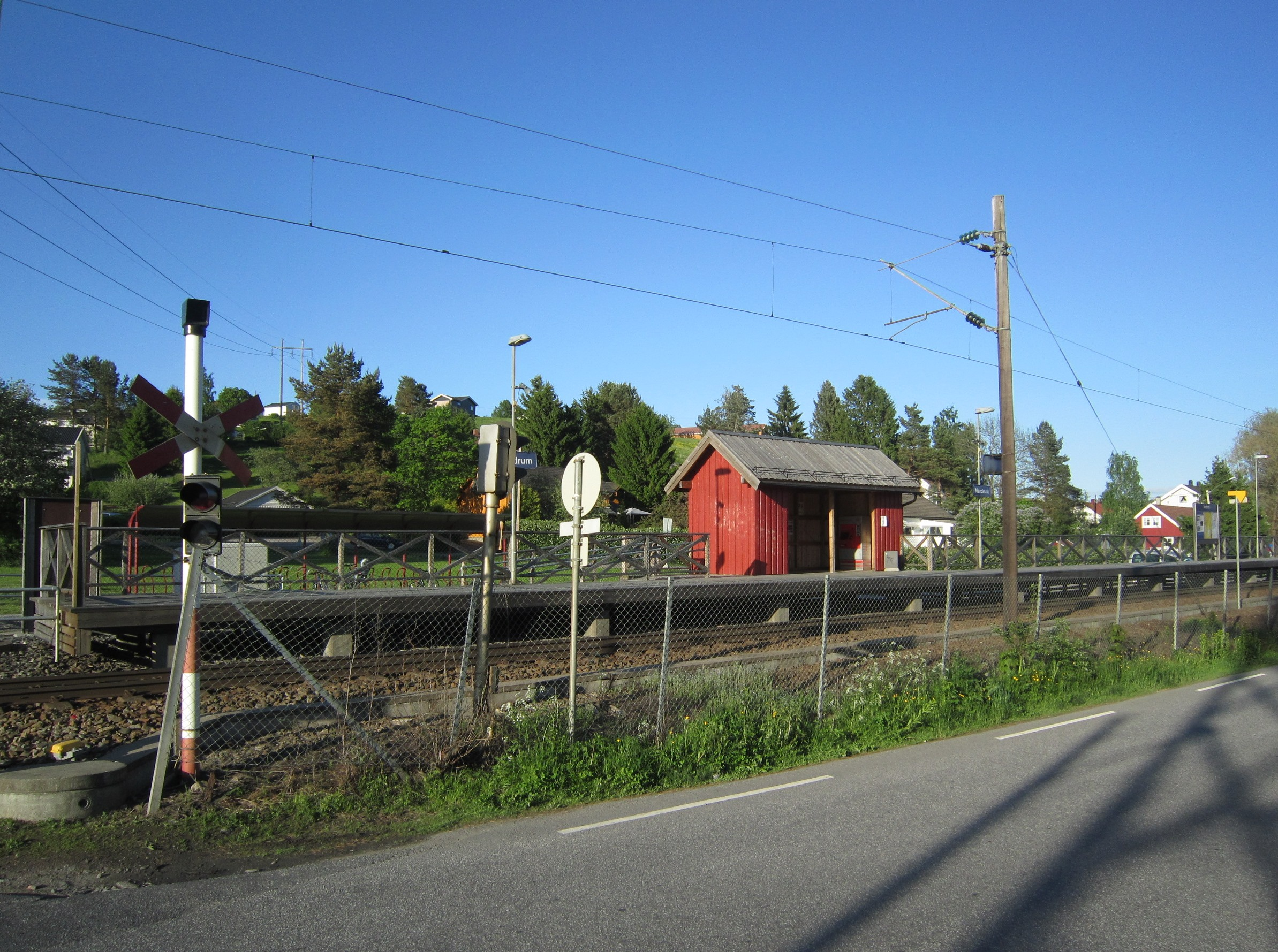

General information
- Location: Fetsund, Fet; Norway
- Coordinates: 59°55′22″N 11°08′29″E
- Owner: Bane NOR
- Operator: Vy
- Line: Kongsvinger Line
- Distance: 24.43 km (15.18 mi)
- Platforms: 1

History
- Opened: 1932; 94 years ago
Location

Nerdrum Station (Norwegian: Nerdrum holdeplass) is a railway station located in Fetsund in Fet, Norway on the Kongsvinger Line. The station was built in 1932. The station is served hourly, with extra rush hour departures, by the Oslo Commuter Rail line R14 operated by Vy.

Preceding station			Following station
Tuen	Kongsvinger Line		Fetsund
Preceding station	Local trains		Following station
Tuen	R14	Asker–Oslo S–Kongsvinger	Fetsund
