= Tuen Station =

Railway halt in Fet, Norway

Tuen
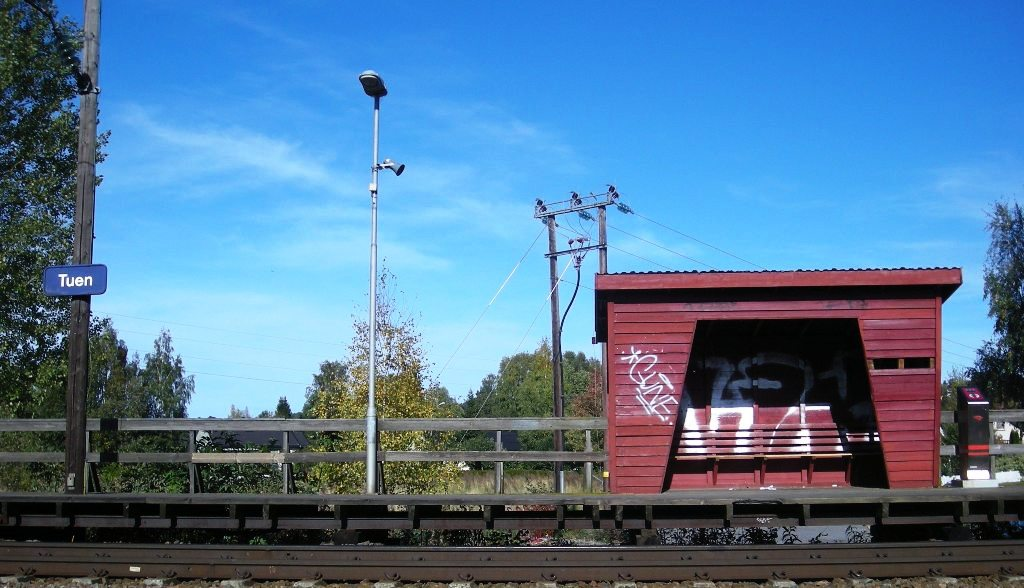

General information
- Location: Fetsund, Fet; Norway
- Coordinates: 59°56′35″N 11°06′07″E
- Owner: Bane NOR
- Operator: Vy
- Line: Kongsvinger Line
- Distance: 24.40 km (15.16 mi)
- Platforms: 1

History
- Opened: 1932; 94 years ago
Location

Tuen Station is a railway halt on the Kongsvinger Line in Fetsund, Fet, Norway.

The station opened on 20 January 1932 and is an unstaffed stop with a single side platform. It is served hourly (with extra rush-hour trains) by Vy commuter trains on route R14 between Asker and Kongsvinger.

== History ==
Tuen was built in 1932 to serve the local population in the Fetsund area. It has remained a simple halt with basic facilities ever since.

== Services ==
Tuen is served by Vy local trains on route R14 (Asker – Oslo S – Kongsvinger). Trains run approximately every hour, with additional departures during peak times.

- Previous station: Lillestrøm
- Next station: Nerdrum

Preceding station			Following station
Lillestrøm	Kongsvinger Line		Nerdrum
Preceding station	Local trains		Following station
Lillestrøm	R14	Asker–Oslo S–Kongsvinger	Nerdrum

== Facilities ==
- One side platform (90 m long)
- Platform shelter
- Limited accessibility (short steep ramp)
- Bicycle stands
- Small parking area nearby
