= Guttersrud Station =

Railway station in Fet, Norway

Guttersrud
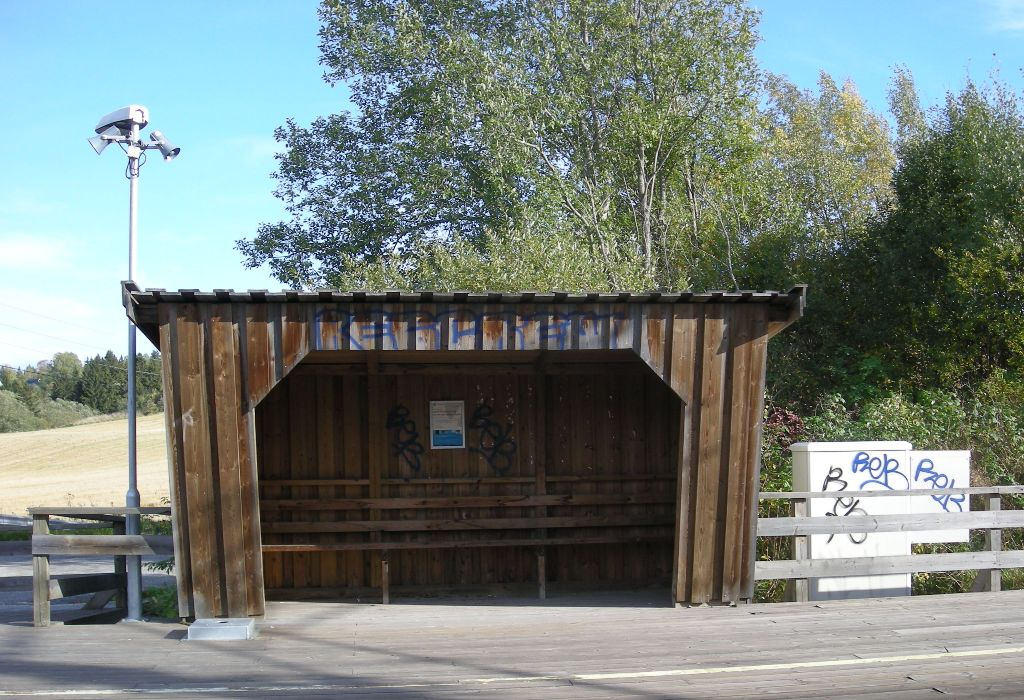

General information
- Location: Fetsund, Fet; Norway
- Coordinates: 59°57′54″N 11°12′00″E
- Owner: Bane NOR
- Operator: Vy
- Line: Kongsvinger Line
- Distance: 34.19 km (21.24 mi)
- Platforms: 1

History
- Opened: 1932; 94 years ago
Location

Guttersrud Station (Norwegian: Guttersrud holdeplass) is a railway station located in Fetsund in Fet, Norway on the Kongsvinger Line. The station was built in 1932. The station is served hourly, with extra rush hour departures, by the Oslo Commuter Rail line R14 operated by Vy.

30. jul. 2012 - Guttersrud has been closed for several years. This is due to the construction of the new station at Roven. After building a new station at Roven, Guttersrud would be located between to signals in a way not allowed according to regulations. Many attempts from locals failed to save the station. Passengers are requested to use Sørumsand or Svingen.

Preceding station			Following station
Svingen	Kongsvinger Line		Sørumsand
Preceding station	Local trains		Following station
Svingen	R14	Asker–Oslo S–Kongsvinger	Sørumsand
