= Svingen Station =

Railway station in Fet, Norway

Svingen
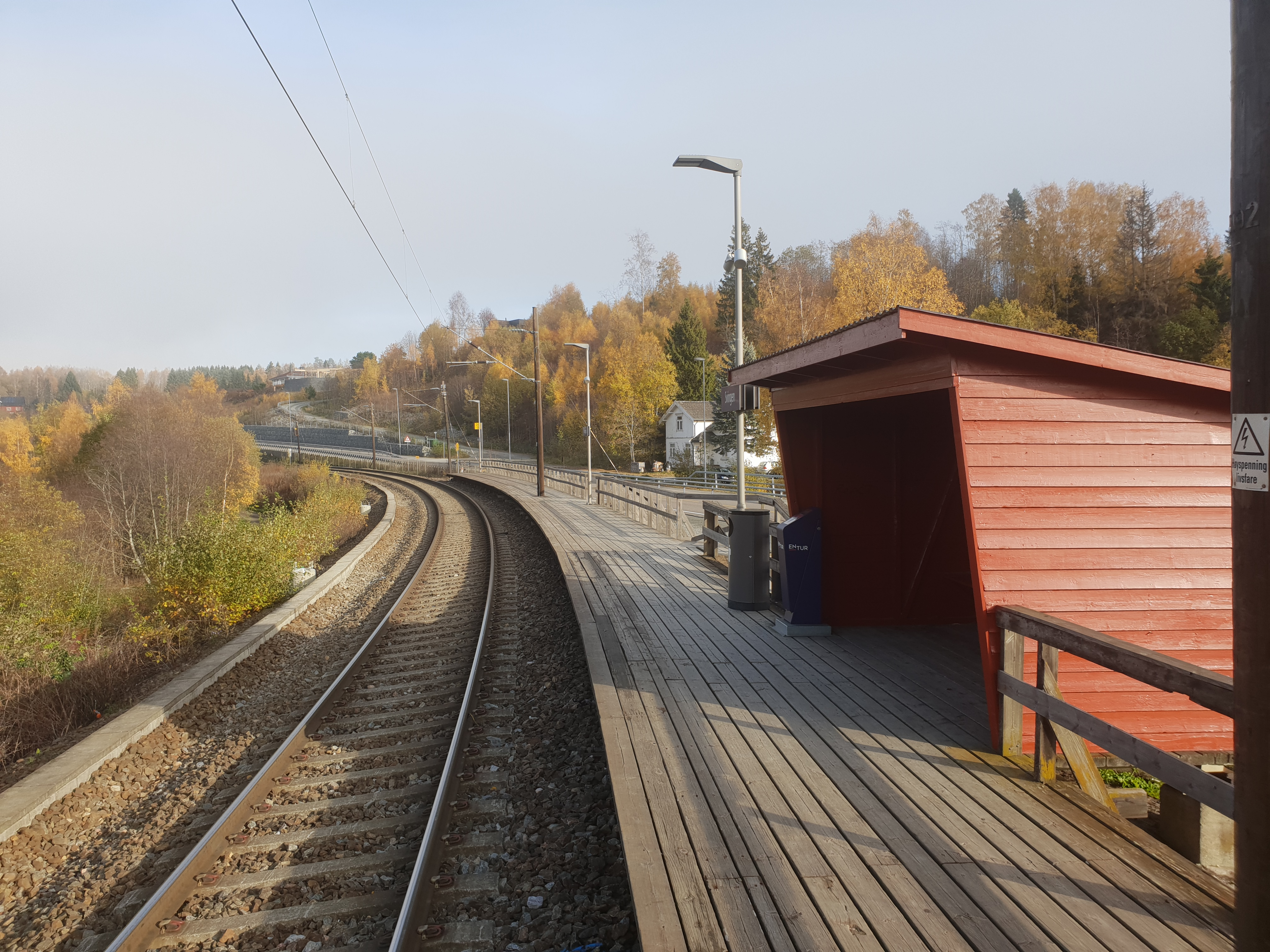
- Svingen station (2009)

General information
- Location: Fetsund, Fet; Norway
- Coordinates: 59°55′44″N 11°10′39″E
- Owner: Bane NOR
- Operator: Vy
- Line: Kongsvinger Line
- Distance: 29.91 km (18.59 mi)
- Platforms: 1

History
- Opened: 1932; 94 years ago
Location

Svingen Station (Norwegian: Svingen holdeplass) is a railway station located in Fetsund in Fet, Norway on the Kongsvinger Line. The station was built in 1932. The station is served by the Oslo Commuter Rail line R14 operated by Vy. As one of the smallest stations on the line, most trains do not stop here, and the station is served only by two morning rush hour trains towards Oslo, and two evening rush hour trains towards Kongsvinger.

Preceding station			Following station
Fetsund	Kongsvinger Line		Guttersrud
Preceding station	Local trains		Following station
Fetsund	R14	Asker–Oslo S–Kongsvinger	Guttersrud
