= Fetsund Station =

Railway station in Fetsund, Norway

Fetsund
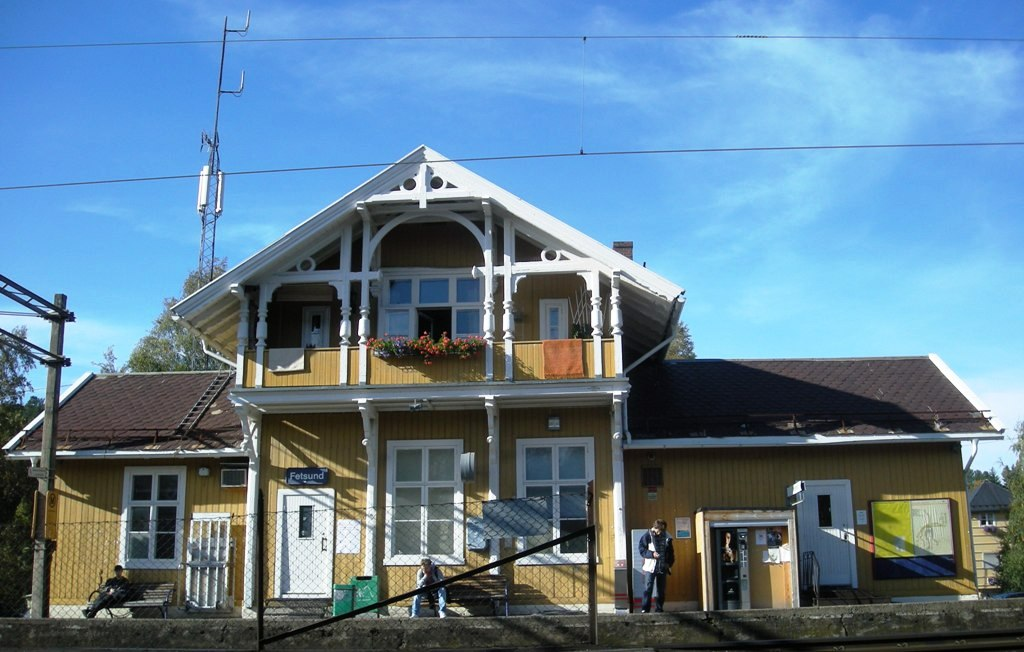

General information
- Location: Fetsund, Fet; Norway
- Coordinates: 59°55′38″N 11°09′47″E
- Owner: Bane NOR
- Operator: Vy
- Line: Kongsvinger Line
- Distance: 29.11 km (18.09 mi)
- Platforms: 2

History
- Opened: October 3, 1862; 163 years ago
Location

Fetsund Station (Norwegian: Fetsund stasjon) is a railway station located in Fetsund in Fet, Norway on Kongsvinger Line. The station was built as part of the Kongsvinger Line in 1862. The station is served hourly, with extra rush hour departures, by the Oslo Commuter Rail line R14 operated by Vy.

Preceding station			Following station
Nerdrum	Kongsvinger Line		Svingen
Preceding station	Local trains		Following station
Nerdrum	R14	Asker–Oslo S–Kongsvinger	Svingen
