= Bodung Station =

Railway station in Nes, Norway

Bodung
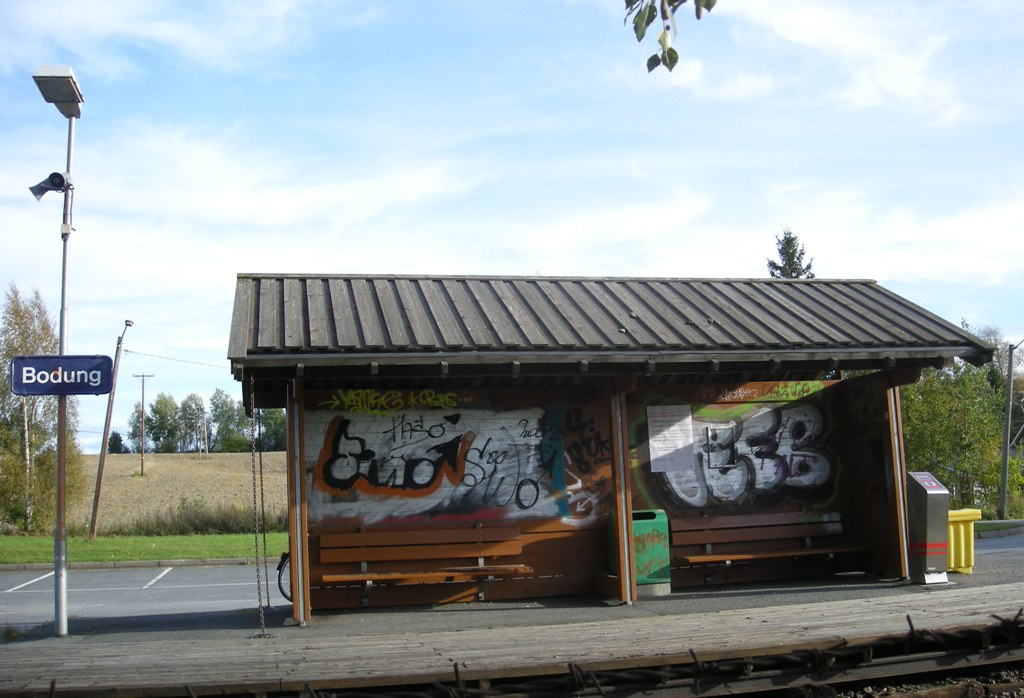
- Bodung Station (2009)

General information
- Location: Bodung, Nes; Norway
- Coordinates: 60°05′06″N 11°25′11″E
- Elevation: 126.6 m (415 ft)
- Owner: Bane NOR
- Operator: Vy
- Line: Kongsvinger Line
- Distance: 53.38 km
- Platforms: 1

History
- Opened: 1913; 113 years ago
Location

Bodung Station (Norwegian: Bodung holdeplass) is a railway station located in Bodung in Nes, Norway on the Kongsvinger Line. The station was built in 1913 as part of the Kongsvinger Line. The station is served hourly, with extra rush hour departures, by the Oslo Commuter Rail line R14 operated by Vy.

Preceding station			Following station
Haga	Kongsvinger Line		Årnes
Preceding station	Local trains		Following station
Haga	R14	Asker–Oslo S–Kongsvinger	Årnes
