= Sørumsand Station =

Railway station in Sørum, Norway

Sørumsand
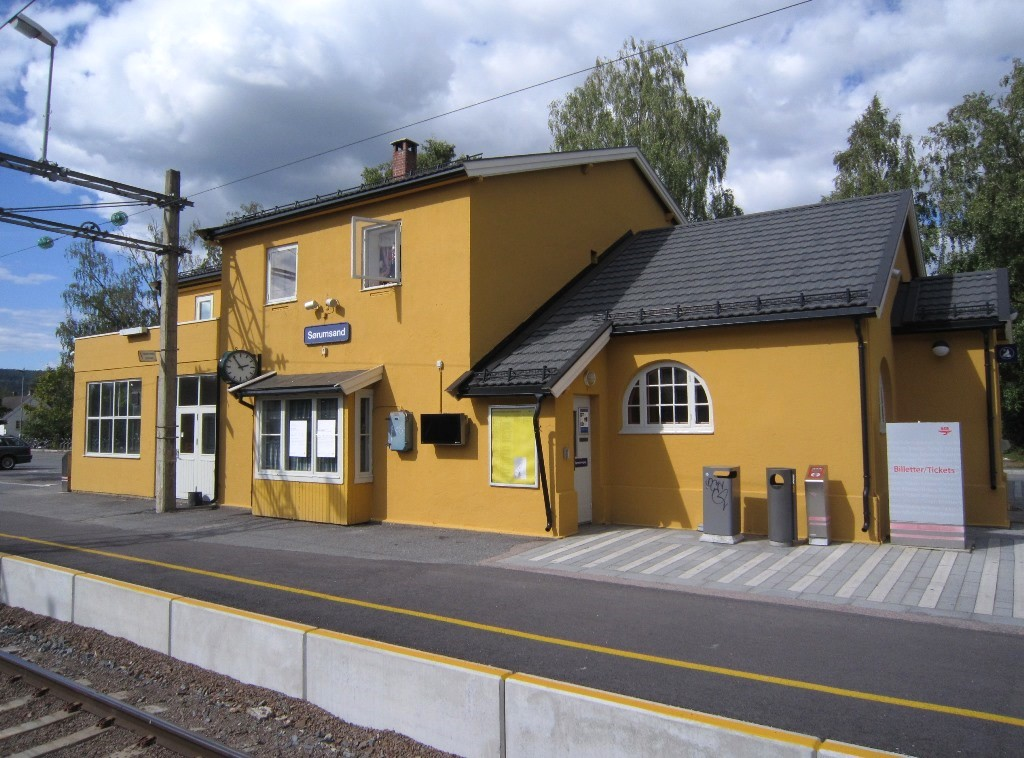
- Sørumsand stasjon

General information
- Location: Sørumsand, Sørum; Norway
- Coordinates: 59°59′09″N 11°14′25″E
- Elevation: 120.1 m (394 ft)
- Owner: Bane NOR
- Operator: Vy, Vy Tåg
- Lines: Kongsvinger Line; Urskog–Høland Line
- Distance: 37.53 km
- Platforms: 1

History
- Opened: 1892; 134 years ago
Location

Sørumsand Station (Norwegian: Sørumsand stasjon) is a railway station located at Sørumsand in Sørum in Akershus, Norway.

== History ==
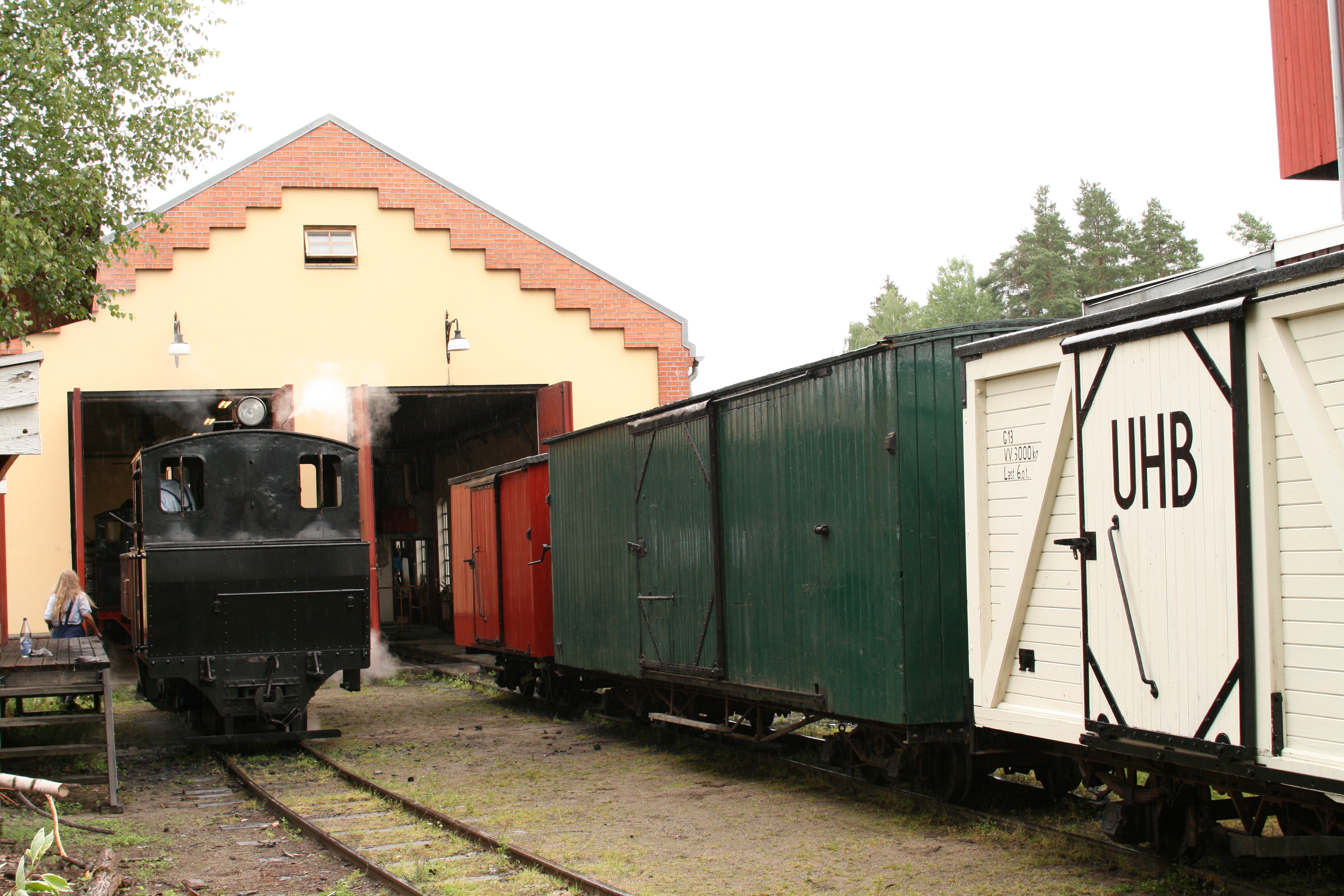
Heritage railway at Sørumsand

The station is on Kongsvinger Line and is served hourly, with extra rush hour departures, by the Oslo Commuter Rail line R14 operated by Vy. In addition there are trains to Sweden operated by Vy Tåg on weekends. The station was opened as part of the Kongsvinger Line in 1892. In 1906 it became the terminal station of Urskog–Høland Line, though the latter line closed in 1961. Today there is a heritage railway that operates from Sørumsand to Fossum.

Preceding station			Following station
Guttersrud	Kongsvinger Line		Blaker
—	Urskog–Høland Line		Bingsfoss
Preceding station	Local trains		Following station
Guttersrud	R14	Asker–Oslo S–Kongsvinger	Blaker
