= Blaker Station =

Railway station in Sørum, Norway

Blaker
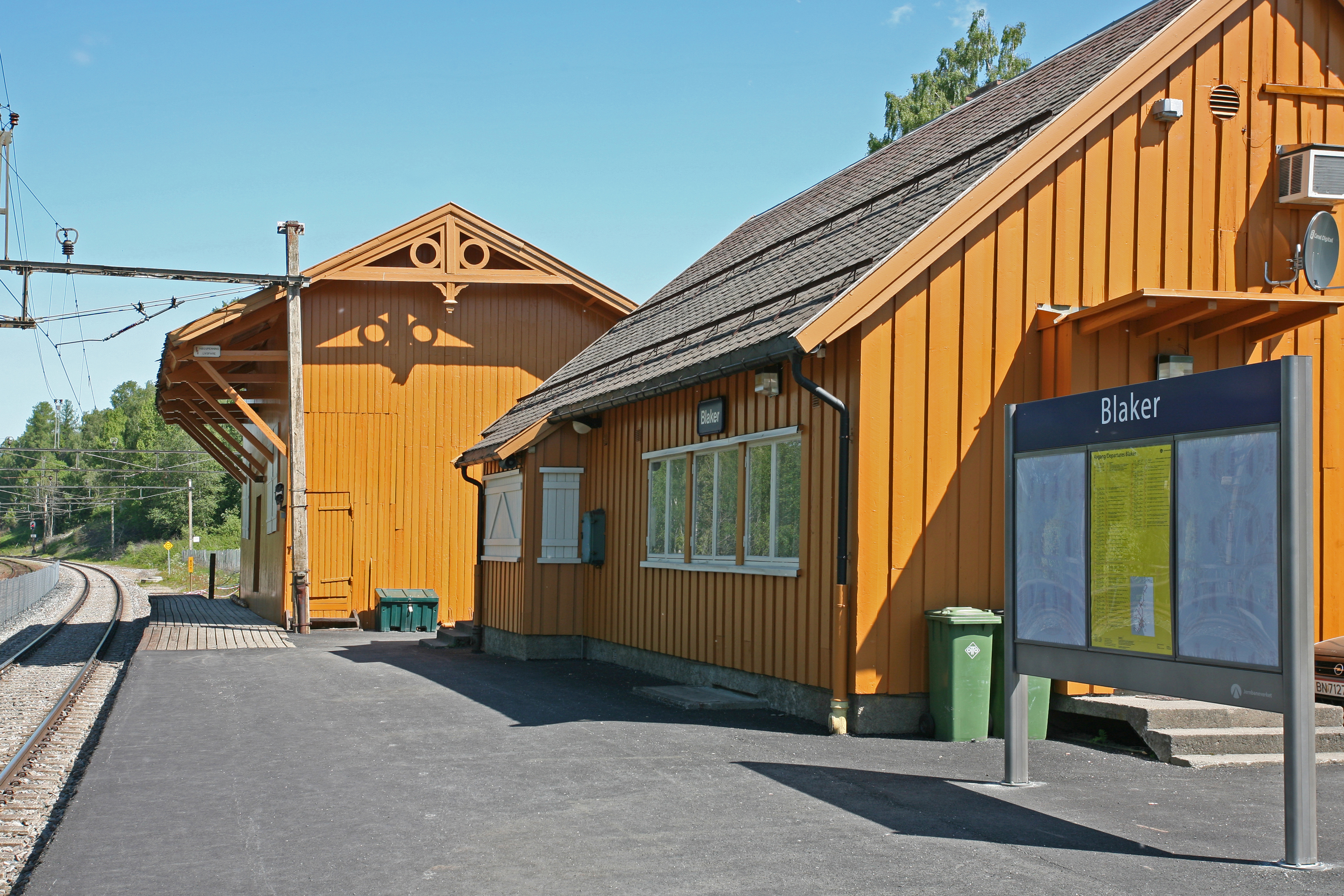

General information
- Location: Blaker, Sørum; Norway
- Coordinates: 60°00′18″N 11°18′05″E
- Elevation: 114.3 m (375 ft)
- Owner: Bane NOR
- Operator: Vy
- Line: Kongsvinger Line
- Distance: 41.98 km (26.09 mi)
- Platforms: 2

History
- Opened: October 3, 1862; 163 years ago
Location

Blaker Station (Norwegian: Blaker stasjon) is a railway station located in Blaker in Sørum, Norway on the Kongsvinger Line. The station was built in 1862 as part of the Kongsvinger Line. The station is served hourly, with extra rush hour departures, by the Oslo Commuter Rail line R14 operated by Vy.

Preceding station			Following station
Sørumsand	Kongsvinger Line		Rånåsfoss
Preceding station	Local trains		Following station
Sørumsand	R14	Asker–Oslo S–Kongsvinger	Rånåsfoss
