= Rånåsfoss Station =

Railway station in Sørum, Norway

Rånåsfoss
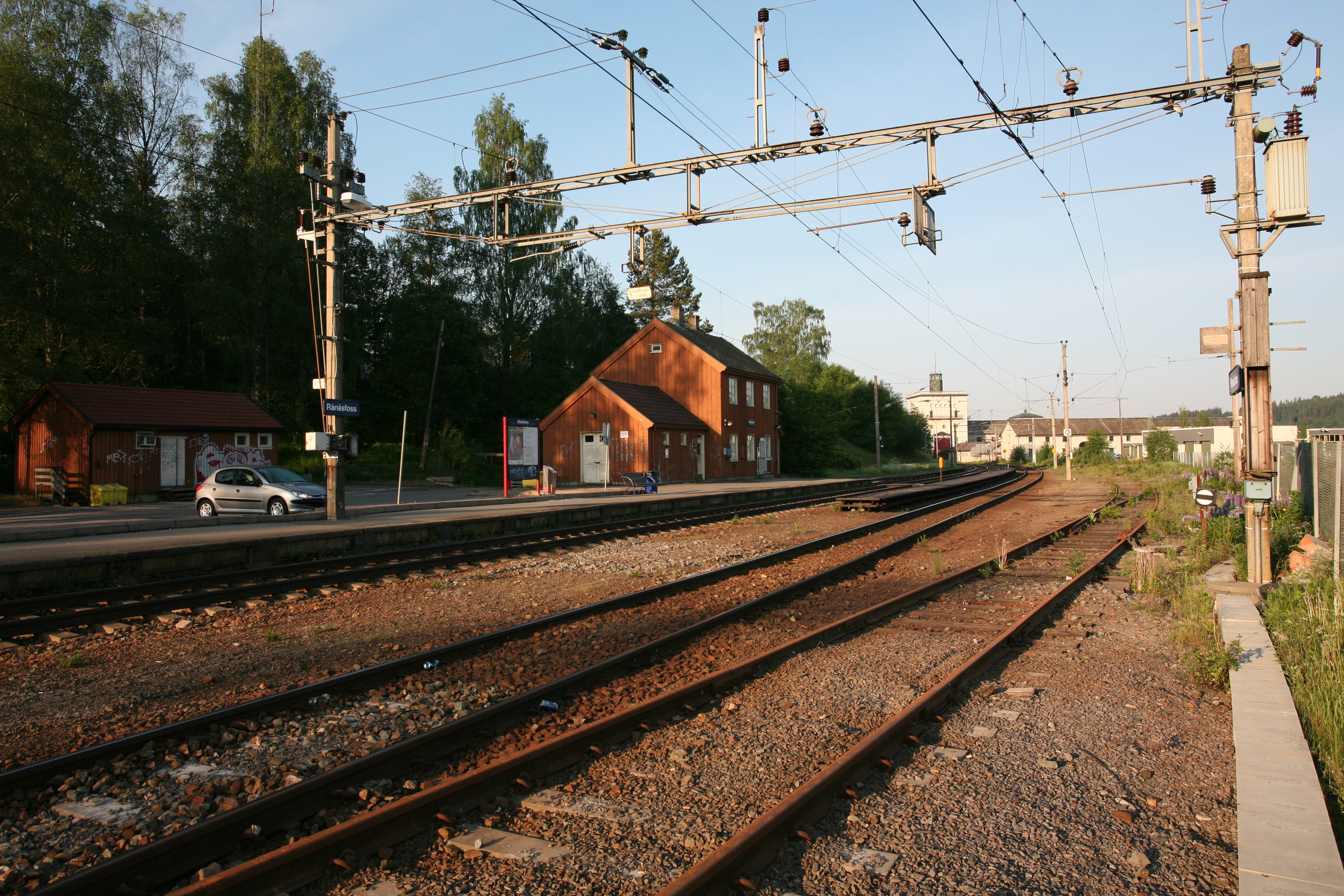

General information
- Location: Rånåsfoss, Sørum; Norway
- Coordinates: 60°01′45″N 11°19′39″E
- Elevation: 122.5 m (402 ft)
- Owner: Bane NOR
- Operator: Vy
- Line: Kongsvinger Line
- Distance: 45.11 km (28.03 mi)
- Platforms: 2

History
- Opened: 1918; 108 years ago
Location

Rånåsfoss Station (Norwegian: Rånåsfoss stasjon) is a railway station located in Rånåsfoss in Sørum, Norway on Kongsvinger Line. The station was built in 1918 as part of the Kongsvinger Line. The station is served hourly, with extra rush hour departures, by the Oslo Commuter Rail line R14 operated by Vy.

Preceding station			Following station
Blaker	Kongsvinger Line		Auli
Preceding station	Local trains		Following station
Blaker	R14	Asker–Oslo S–Kongsvinger	Auli
