= Auli station =

Railway station in Nes, Norway

Auli
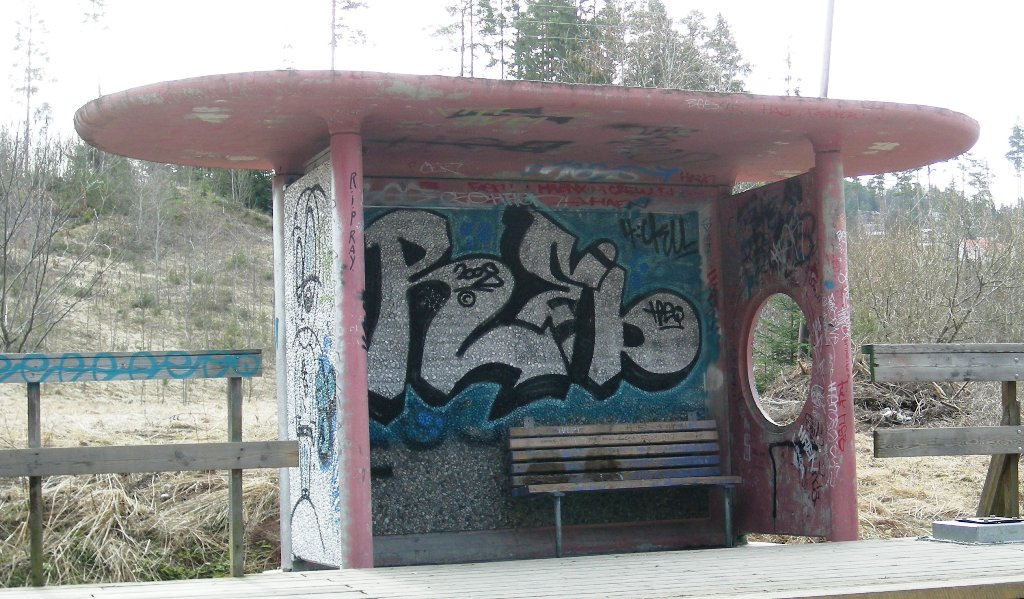

General information
- Location: Auli, Nes; Norway
- Coordinates: 60°02′19″N 11°21′05″E_dim:1500
- Owner: Bane NOR
- Operator: Vy
- Line: Kongsvinger Line
- Distance: 46.87 km
- Platforms: 2

History
- Opened: 1974; 52 years ago
Location

Auli Station (Norwegian: Auli holdeplass) is a railway station located in Auli in Nes, Norway on the Kongsvinger Line. The station was built in 1974 as part of the Kongsvinger Line. The station is served hourly, with extra rush hour departures, by the Oslo Commuter Rail line R14 operated by Vy.

Preceding station			Following station
Rånåsfoss	Kongsvinger Line		Haga
Preceding station	Local trains		Following station
Rånåsfoss	R14	Asker–Oslo S–Kongsvinger	Haga
