= Galterud =

Village in Sør-Odal Municipality, Norway

- Village
- Interactive map of Galterud
- Location within Innlandet Location within Norway
- Coordinates: 60.18312°N 11.88611°E
- Country: Norway
- Region: Eastern Norway
- County: Innlandet
- District: Odalen
- Municipality: Sør-Odal Municipality
- Elevation: 168 m (551 ft)
- Time zone: UTC+01:00 (CET)
  - Summer (DST): UTC+02:00 (CEST)
- Post Code: 2223 Galterud

Galterud is a small village in Sør-Odal Municipality in Innlandet county, Norway. The village is located on the south side of the river Glomma, about 8 kilometres (5.0 mi) west of the town of Kongsvinger and about 6 kilometres (3.7 mi) southeast of the village of Sander.

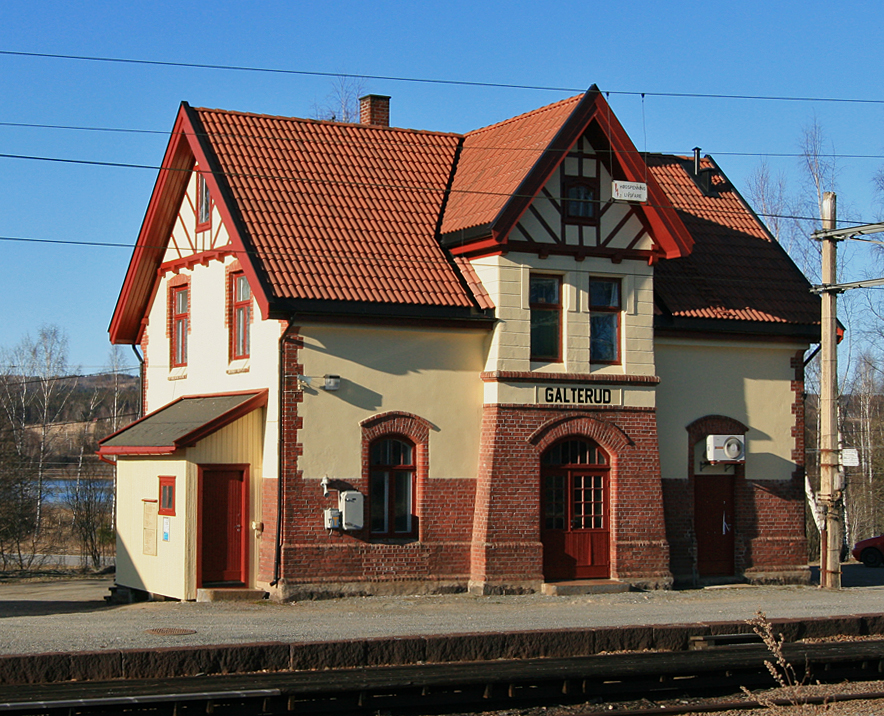
View of the Galterud Station

The Kongsvingerbanen railway runs through the village, stopping at Galterud Station.

Arons Hule (lit. 'Arons Cave') is a tourist attraction located south of Galterud.
