= Årnes Station =

Railway station in Nes, Norway

Årnes
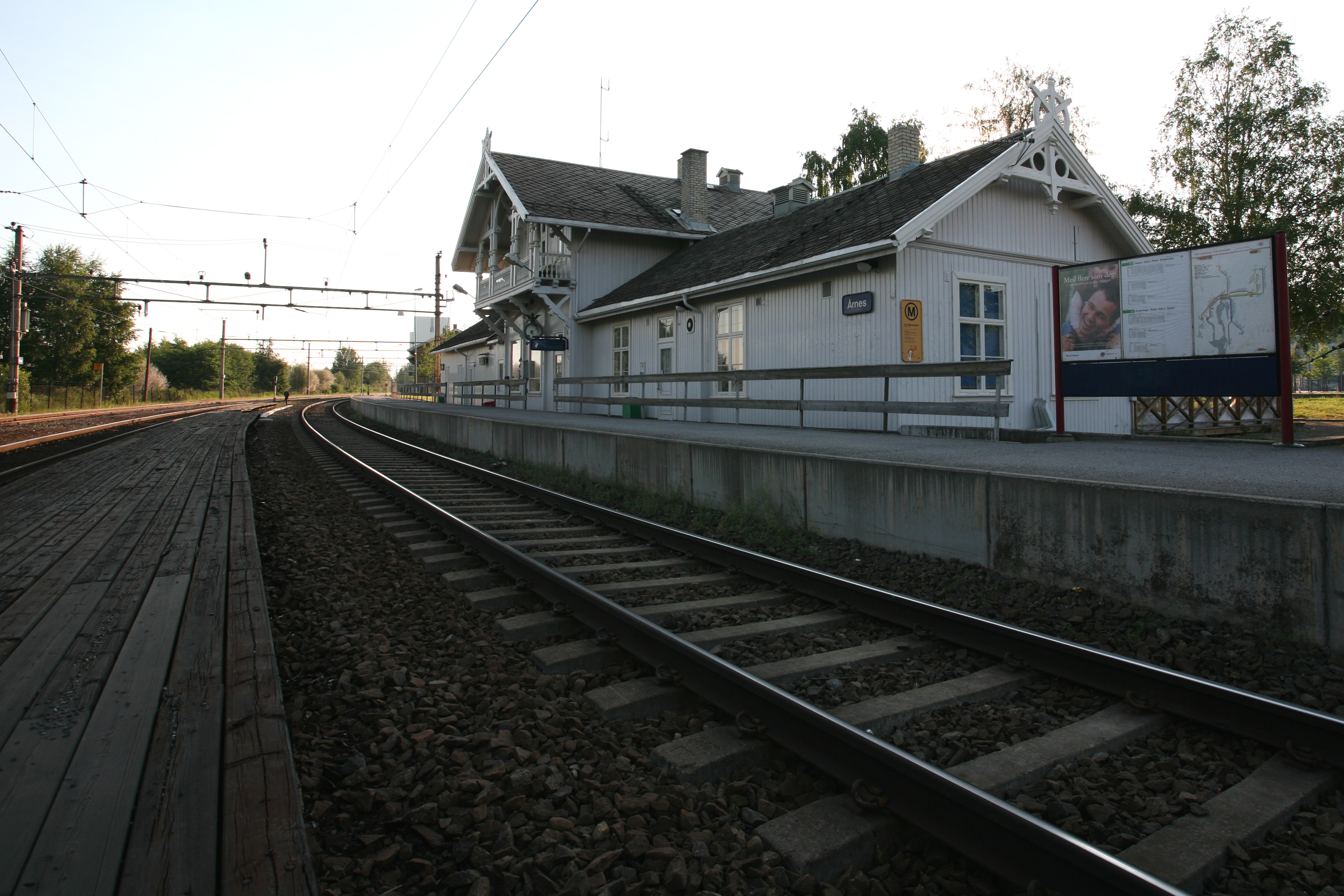

General information
- Location: Årnes, Nes; Norway
- Coordinates: 60°07′24″N 11°27′53″E
- Elevation: 127.1 m (417 ft)
- Owner: Bane NOR
- Operator: Vy, Vy Tåg
- Line: Kongsvinger Line
- Distance: 58.46 km (36.33 mi)
- Platforms: 2

Other information
- Station code: ÅRN

History
- Opened: October 3, 1862; 163 years ago
Location

Årnes Station (Norwegian: Årnes stasjon) is a railway station on the Kongsvinger Line located in Årnes in Nes Municipality in Akershus county, Norway. The station was built in 1862 as part of Kongsvingerbanen. The station is served hourly by the Oslo Commuter Rail line R14 operated by Vy, in addition to extra rush-hour trains and express trains to Kongsvinger and Sweden. Most commuter trains terminate at Årnes.

Preceding station			Following station
Bodung	Kongsvinger Line		Seterstøa
Preceding station	Local trains		Following station
Bodung	R14	Asker–Oslo S–Kongsvinger	Seterstøa
