= Sander Station =

Railway station in Sør-Odal, Norway

Sander
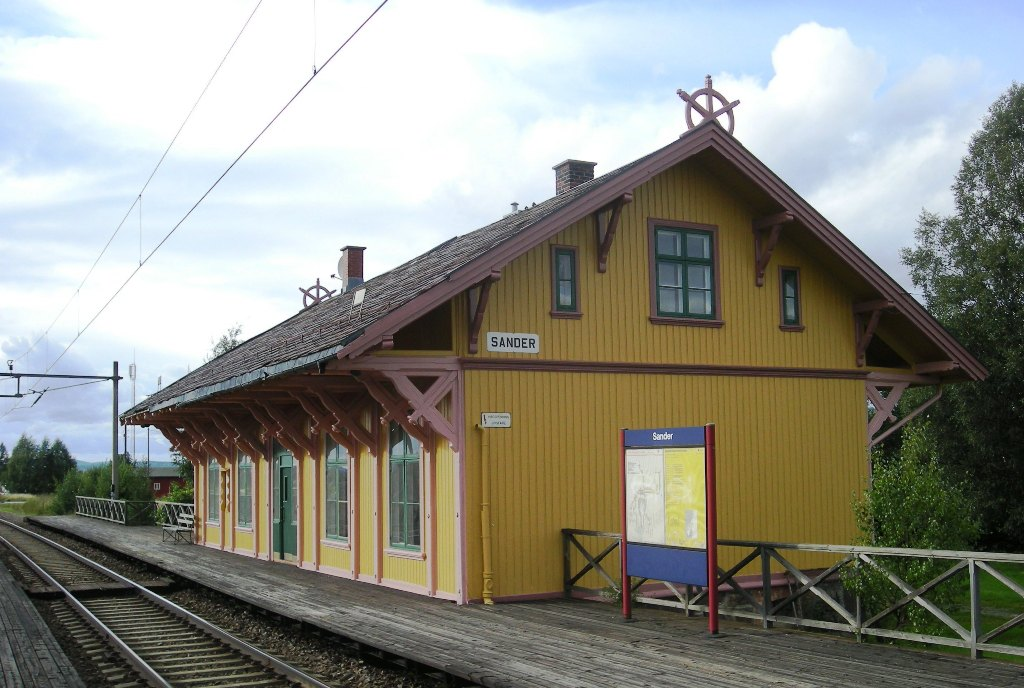

General information
- Location: Sander, Sør-Odal Municipality; Norway
- Coordinates: 60°13′35″N 11°48′34″E
- Elevation: 141.7 m (465 ft)
- Owner: Bane NOR
- Operator: Vy
- Line: Kongsvinger Line
- Distance: 87.22 km (54.20 mi)
- Platforms: 2

History
- Opened: October 3, 1862; 163 years ago
Location

Sander Station (Norwegian: Sander stasjon) is a railway station located along the Kongsvinger Line in the village of Sander in Sør-Odal Municipality, Norway. The station was built in 1862 as part of the Kongsvinger Line. The station is served five times daily Oslo Commuter Rail line R14 operated by Vy.

Preceding station			Following station
Skarnes	Kongsvinger Line		Galterud
Preceding station	Local trains		Following station
Skarnes	R14	Asker–Oslo S–Kongsvinger	Galterud
