= Seterstøa =

- Village
- Location in Akershus
- Coordinates: 60°10′N 11°34′E
- Country: Norway
- Region: Østlandet
- County: Akershus
- Municipality: Nes

Area
  - Total: 0.109 km^{2} (0.042 sq mi)
- Elevation: 135 m (443 ft)

Population (869 (2025 Census))
  - Total: 869
  - Density: 7,973/km^{2} (20,650/sq mi)
- Time zone: UTC+01:00 (CET)
  - Summer (DST): UTC+02:00 (CEST)
- Post Code: 2150 Årnes

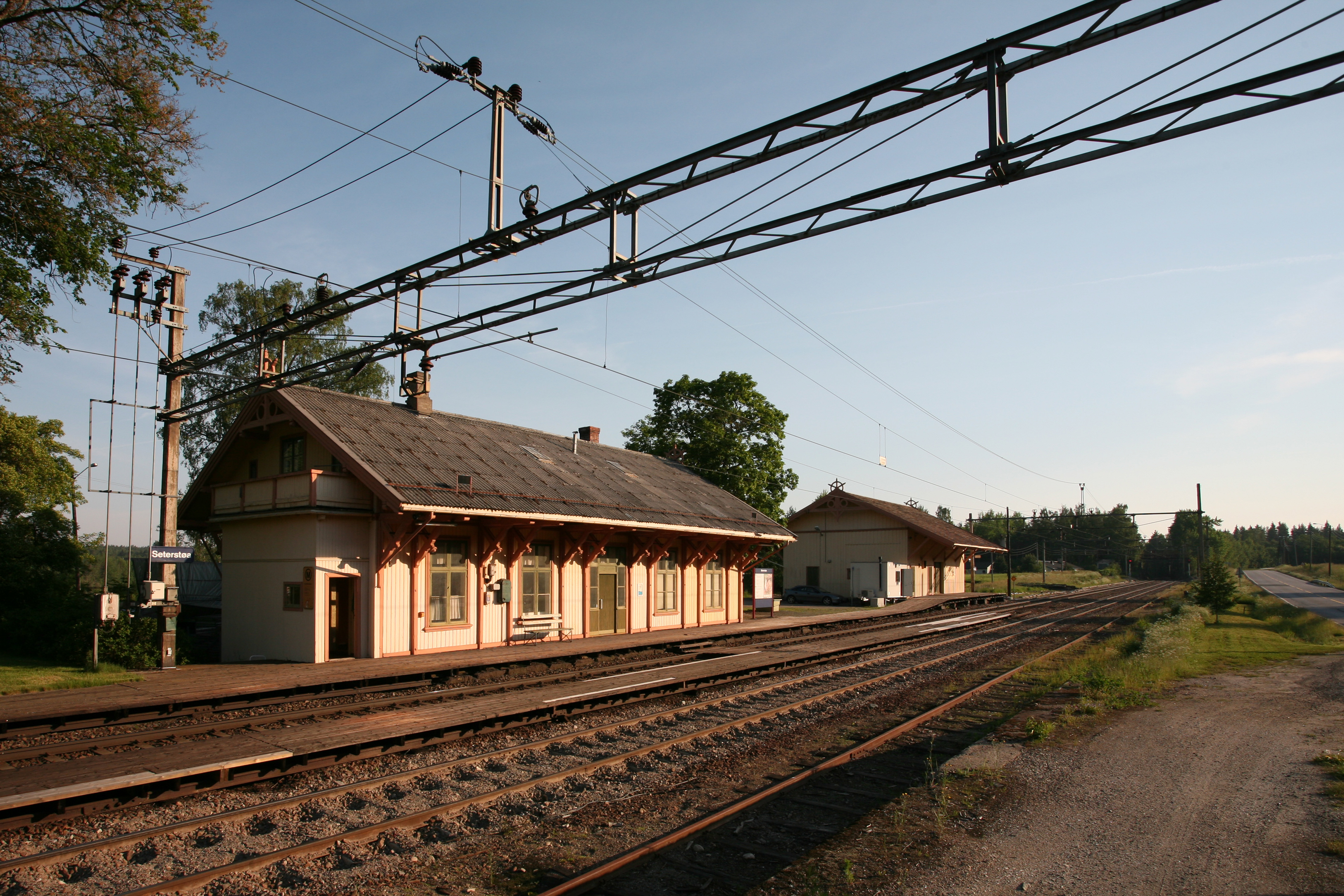
Seterstøa Station

Seterstøa is a village in Nes in Akershus, Norway. The village has a railway station, Seterstøa Station on Kongsvingerbanen. There is also a bridge over Glomma at Seterstøa, replacing the former ferry. The population of the village has declined to that of an estimated 869 persons. Seterstøa was created in 1962 to serve as a railway station among Kongsvingerbanen, a medium-length railway between Lillestrøm and Kongsvinger, the two main towns in which the railway is used for transport. In December 2012, Norwegian State Railways no longer used the station following the agency's discontinuation, thus putting the station out of passenger service. The village is locally governed in the Nes Municipality, with the neighboring Sør-Odal Municipality being just across the Glonma.

Despite the Seterstøa Station's closure, the village is still primarily used as a point of transportation among Nes Municipality and the villages facing the Glonma. Seterstøavegen is a road that connects Seterstøa and Årnes, and it is the primary road the villagers of Årnes and Seterstøa use to travel externally from Nes Municipality.

== History ==
Seterstøa was originally a rural town dedicated purely to agricultural practices, usual of villages in Nes Municipality. Due to the village's proximity to the Glonma, various ferry ways were developed as a mode of transportation. On October 3, 1962, the Seterstøa Station was opened, constructed by two German-born architects, Wilhelm von Hanno and Heinrich Schirmer.

== Etymology ==
The name of Seterstøa simply means, "a farm name," in Norwegian language.
