= Haga Station =

Haga Station may refer to:

- Haga station (Gothenburg), a railway station in Gothenburg, Sweden
- Haga Station (Norway), a railway station in Nes, Norway
