= Galterud Station =

Railway station in Sør-Odal, Norway

Galterud
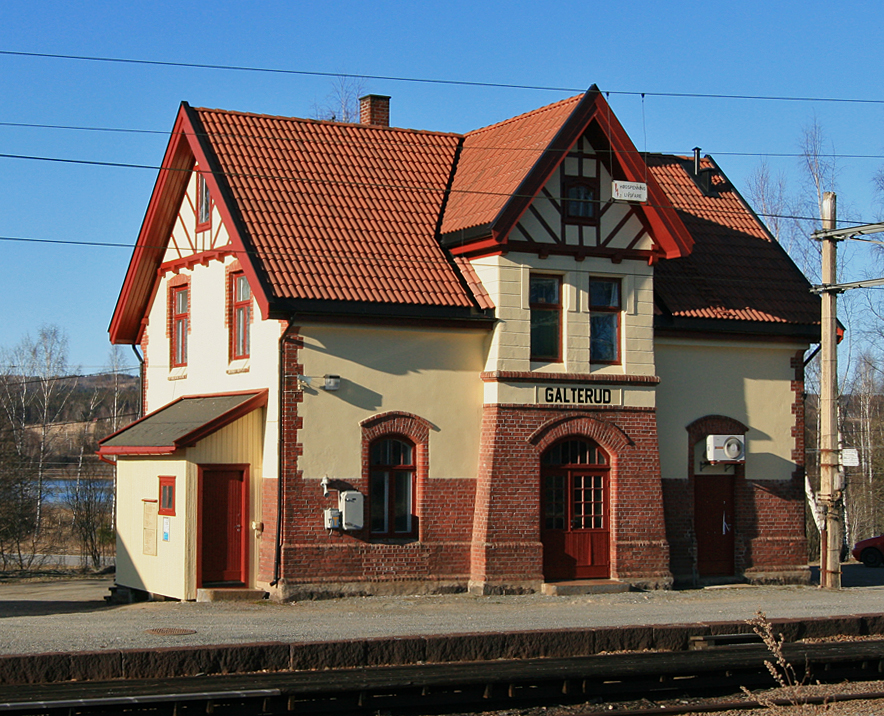

General information
- Location: Galterud, Sør-Odal Municipality; Norway
- Coordinates: 60°11′50″N 11°52′50″E
- Elevation: 140.4 m (461 ft)
- Line: Kongsvinger Line
- Distance: 92.37 km (57.40 mi)
- Platforms: 2

Construction
- Architect: Paul Armin Due

History
- Opened: 1864; 162 years ago
- Closed: 9 Dec 2012
Location

Galterud Station (Norwegian: Galterud stasjon) was a railway station located in the village of Galterud in Sør-Odal Municipality in Innlandet county, Norway. It is located along the Kongsvinger Line (Kongsvingerbanen).

== History ==
Galterud station was opened in 1864 as a stopover on the Kongsvinger railway. In 1913, Galterud was upgraded to station status. It was staffed until 1966 when it became remote controlled. The station was shut down on 9 December 2012.

Preceding station		Following station
Sander	Kongsvinger Line	Kongsvinger
