= Disenå Station =

Railway station in Sør-Odal, Norway

Disenå
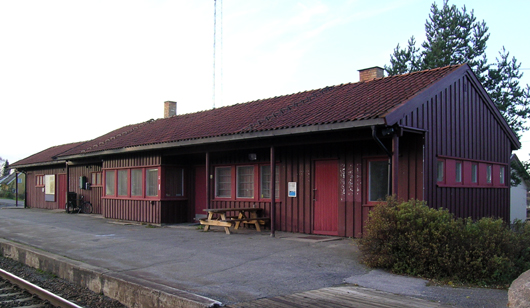

General information
- Location: Disenå, Sør-Odal Municipality; Norway
- Coordinates: 60°12′32″N 11°38′32″E
- Elevation: 134.7 m (442 ft)
- Line: Kongsvinger Line
- Distance: 73.35 km (45.58 mi)
- Platforms: 2

History
- Opened: October 3, 1862; 163 years ago
Location

Disenå Station (Norwegian: Disenå stasjon) is located along the Kongsvinger Line in the village of Disenå in Sør-Odal Municipality, Norway. The station was built in 1862 as part of Kongsvingerbanen. The station was served five times daily Oslo Commuter Rail line 460 operated by the Norwegian State Railways until it was closed down in December 2012.

Preceding station		Following station
Seterstøa	Kongsvinger Line	Skarnes
