= Seterstøa Station =

Railway station in Nes, Norway

Seterstøa
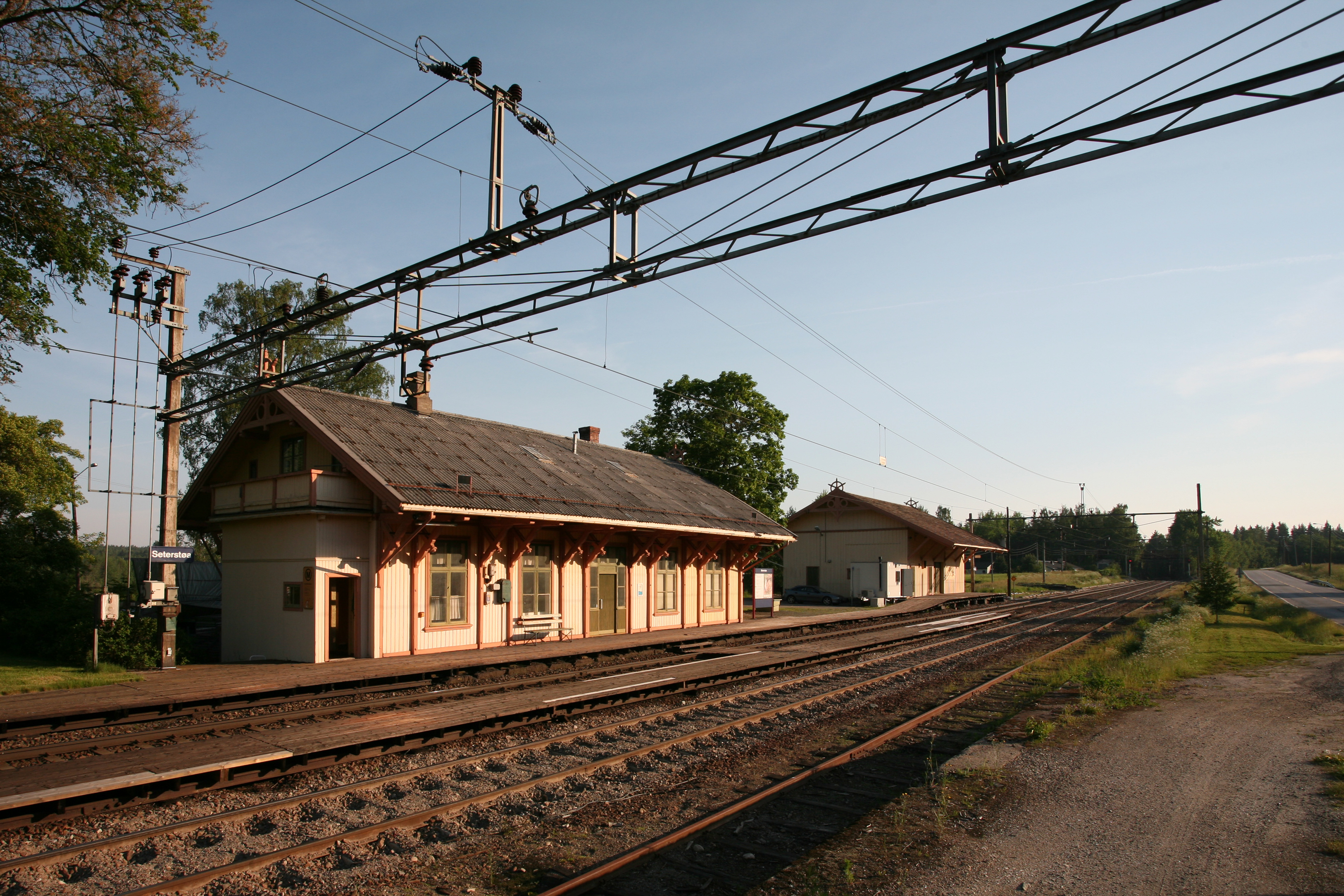

General information
- Location: Seterstøa, Nes; Norway
- Coordinates: 60°10′16″N 11°34′02″E
- Elevation: 135.4 m (444 ft)
- Line: Kongsvinger Line
- Distance: 67.17 km (41.74 mi)
- Platforms: 2

History
- Opened: 3 October 1862; 163 years ago
Location

Seterstøa Station (Norwegian: Seterstøa stasjon) is a railway station located in Seterstøa in Nes, Norway on the Kongsvinger Line. The station was built in 1862 as part of the Kongsvinger Line. The station was served five times daily by Oslo Commuter Rail line 460 operated by Norwegian State Railways until it was closed down in December 2012.

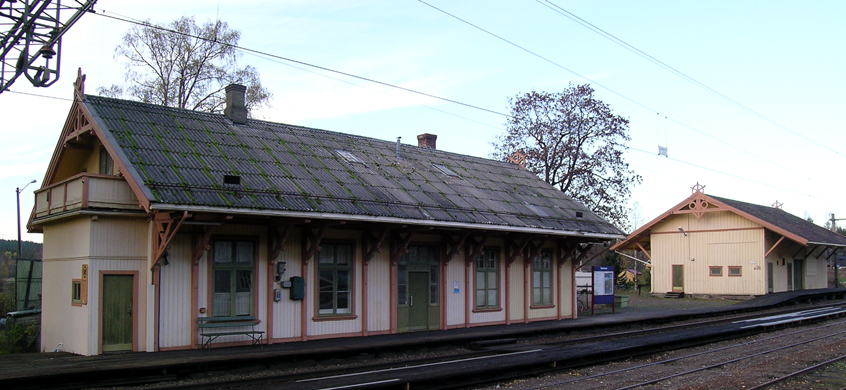
Seterstøa Station

Preceding station		Following station
Årnes	Kongsvinger Line	Disenå
