= Skarnes Station =

Railway station in Sør-Odal, Norway

Skarnes
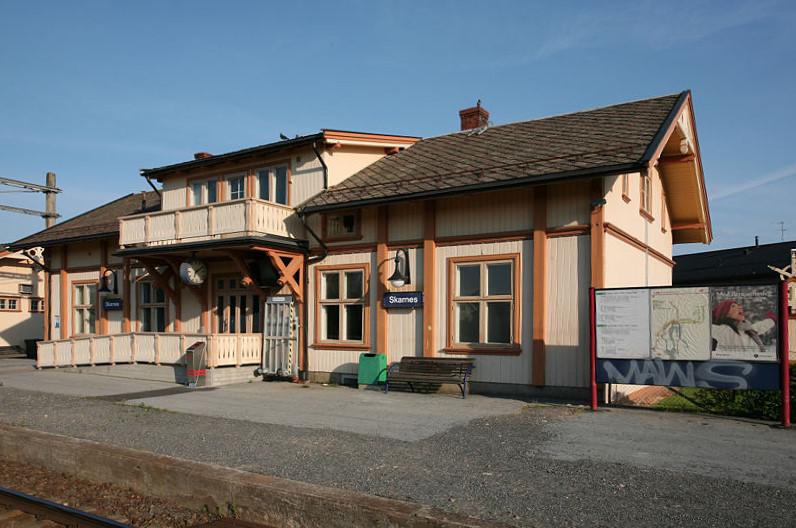

General information
- Location: Skarnes, Sør-Odal Municipality; Norway
- Coordinates: 60°15′13.23″N 11°40′49.59″E
- Elevation: 138.0 m (452.8 ft)
- Owner: Bane NOR
- Operator: Vy; Vy Tåg
- Line: Kongsvinger Line
- Distance: 79.24 km (49.24 mi)
- Platforms: 1

Construction
- Architect: Heinrich Ernst Schirmer and Wilhelm von Hanno

History
- Opened: October 3, 1862; 163 years ago
Location

Skarnes Station (Norwegian: Skarnes stasjon) is a railway station located in the village of Skarnes in Sør-Odal Municipality, Norway. It is on the Kongsvinger Line (Kongsvingerbanen). The station was constructed in 1862 as part of the opening of the Kongsvinger Line. The rail station building was designed by the architectural firm of Heinrich Ernst Schirmer and Wilhelm von Hanno.

The station is served ten times daily Oslo Commuter Rail line R14 operated by Vy and the trains to Sweden operated by Vy Tåg on weekends.

Preceding station			Following station
Disenå	Kongsvinger Line		Sander
Preceding station	Local trains		Following station
Disenå	R14	Asker–Oslo S–Kongsvinger	Sander
