= Arvika railway station =

Railway station in Värmland, Sweden

Arvika
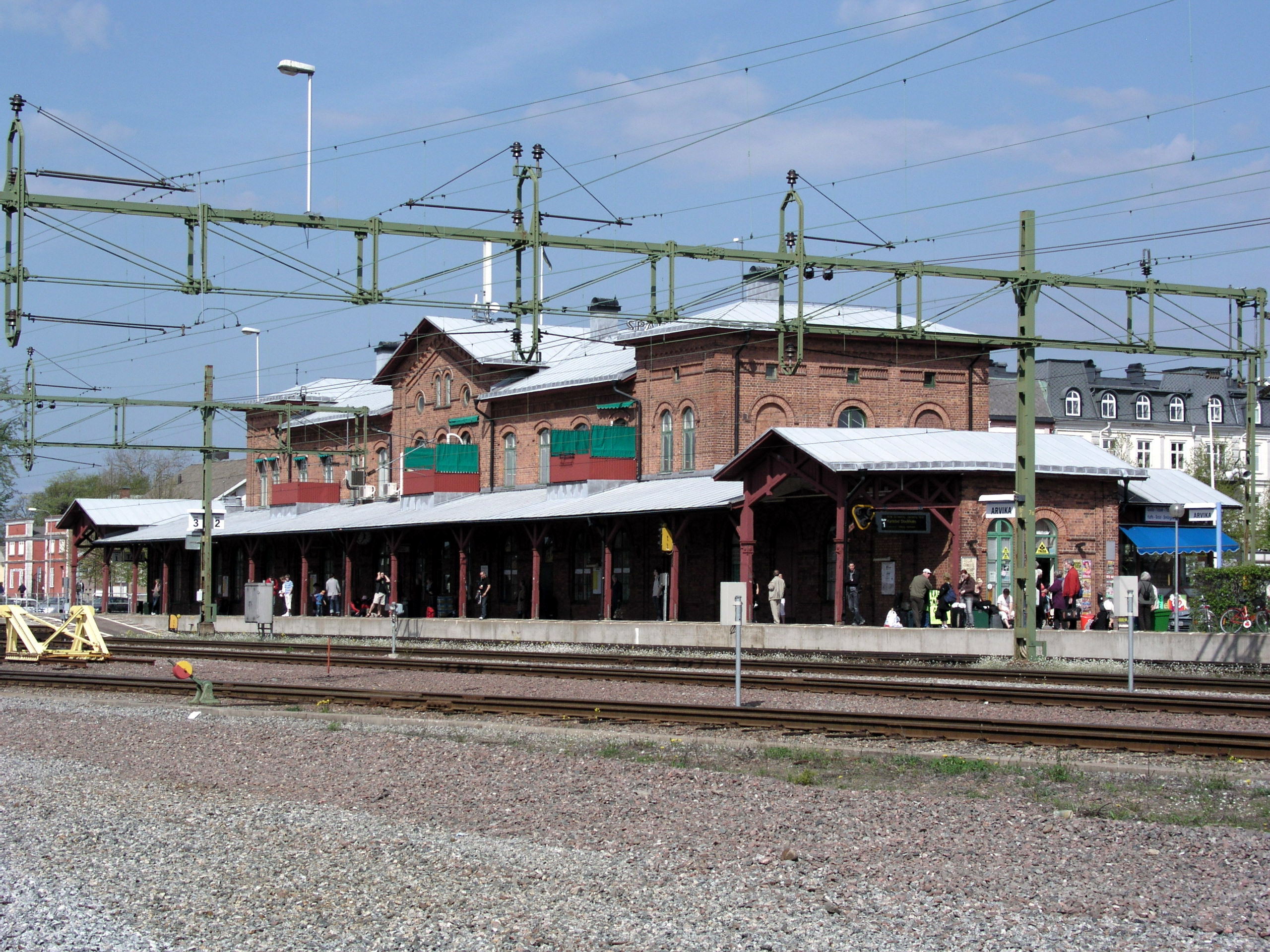
- Station building

General information
- Location: Värmland County; Sweden
- Coordinates: 59°39′13″N 12°35′28″E
- Elevation: 50 metres (160 ft)
- Owner: Jernhusen
- Transit authority: Värmlandstrafik
- Line: Värmland Line
- Distance: 398 km from Stockholm (on the paper); 394 km (after line shortenings)
- Tracks: 3
- Connections: Bus

Construction
- Accessible: yes
- Architect: Adolf W. Edelsvärd

Other information
- Station code: Ar

History
- Opened: 1867

Services
Preceding station	SJ	Following station
Kongsvinger towards Oslo	Värmland Line	Karlstad C towards Stockholm C
Preceding station	Regional trains	Following station
Åmotfors towards Charlottenberg	Värmlandstrafik	Kil towards Degerfors
Location

Arvika railway station is located in Arvika, Sweden, along the Värmland Line. The station is located at the traditional midpoint of the city. City buses and some regional buses stop at the station, while the regional bus station is around 500 metres (1,600 ft) away from the railway station.

== Trains ==
Fast trains operated by SJ and regional trains belonging to Värmlandstrafik stop here.

== History ==
Railway traffic started in Arvika in 1867 with railway access from Oslo, and in 1871 the main line between Oslo and Stockholm started traffic all the way.

Another line existed between 1928 and 1985, the Dal–Västra Värmlands Järnväg between Arvika and Mellerud over Bengtsfors.

The station building is from year 1867.
