= Skedsmo =

Former municipality in Akershus, Norway

Skedsmo was a municipality in Akershus county, Norway. It is part of the traditional region of Romerike. The administrative centre of the municipality was the town of Lillestrøm. About one third of the municipal population lived in Lillestrøm. Other important towns are Skedsmokorset, Skjetten and Strømmen. A smaller settlement adjoining Lillestrøm is Kjeller.

The local newspaper is Romerikes Blad (circulation 39,139 in 2004). The paper comes out daily.

Skedsmo municipality became part of Lillestrøm municipality 1 January 2020.

== General information ==
=== Name ===
The name of the municipality (originally the parish) may have originally been the name for the rectory. In Old Norse the name was Skeiðsmór. The first element is the genitive case of skeið, a neuter noun. One possible meaning of this word, skeið, is "a track for footraces or horseraces"; another "a farm road between fields". The last element is mór, which in this context has been taken to mean "dry sandy plain".

=== Coat of arms ===
The coat of arms was from modern times, granted on 4 October 1974. The arms show three silver horse heads with waving manes on a red background. The arms are canting, a reference to an interpretation of the first part of the name Skedsmo, skeið. The arms were designed by Finn Fagerli from Lillestrøm.

Number of minorities (1st and 2nd generation) in Skedsmo by country of origin in 2017
Ancestry	Number
Pakistan	1,417
Vietnam	1,350
Poland	1,069
Iraq	889
Sri Lanka	803
Iran	722
Afghanistan	611
Sweden	475
Lithuania	453
Turkey	409
India	351
Syria	347
Russia	293
Eritrea	283
Denmark	251

== History ==
Skedsmo was established as a municipality on 1 January 1838 (see formannskapsdistrikt). Lørenskog and Lillestrøm was separated from Skedsmo as municipalities of their own on 1 January 1908. Lillestrøm was, however, merged back into the municipality of Skedsmo on 1 January 1962. On 1 January 2020, Skedsmo was merged with Fet and Sørum municipalities to, once again, form Lillestrøm municipality.

In this area, the tribe of Raumas fought against King Olav Haraldsson, patron saint of Norway, in 1028. The area has become an important part of Norway's industrial history. Strømmens Værksted built the country's first trains, at Kjeller airplanes were constructed up to World War II, the sawmills at Lillestrøm processed lumber from the great forests, and a number of other enterprises have been important.

== Government ==
The head office of Accident Investigation Board Norway is located in Lillestrøm, Skedsmo. and led by Grete Myhre.

== International relations ==
=== Twin towns — Sister cities ===
The following cities are twinned with Skedsmo:

- Alingsås, Sweden
- Karis, Finland
- Riihimäki, Finland
- Tårnby, Denmark
