= Haga Station (Norway) =

Railway station in Nes, Norway

Haga
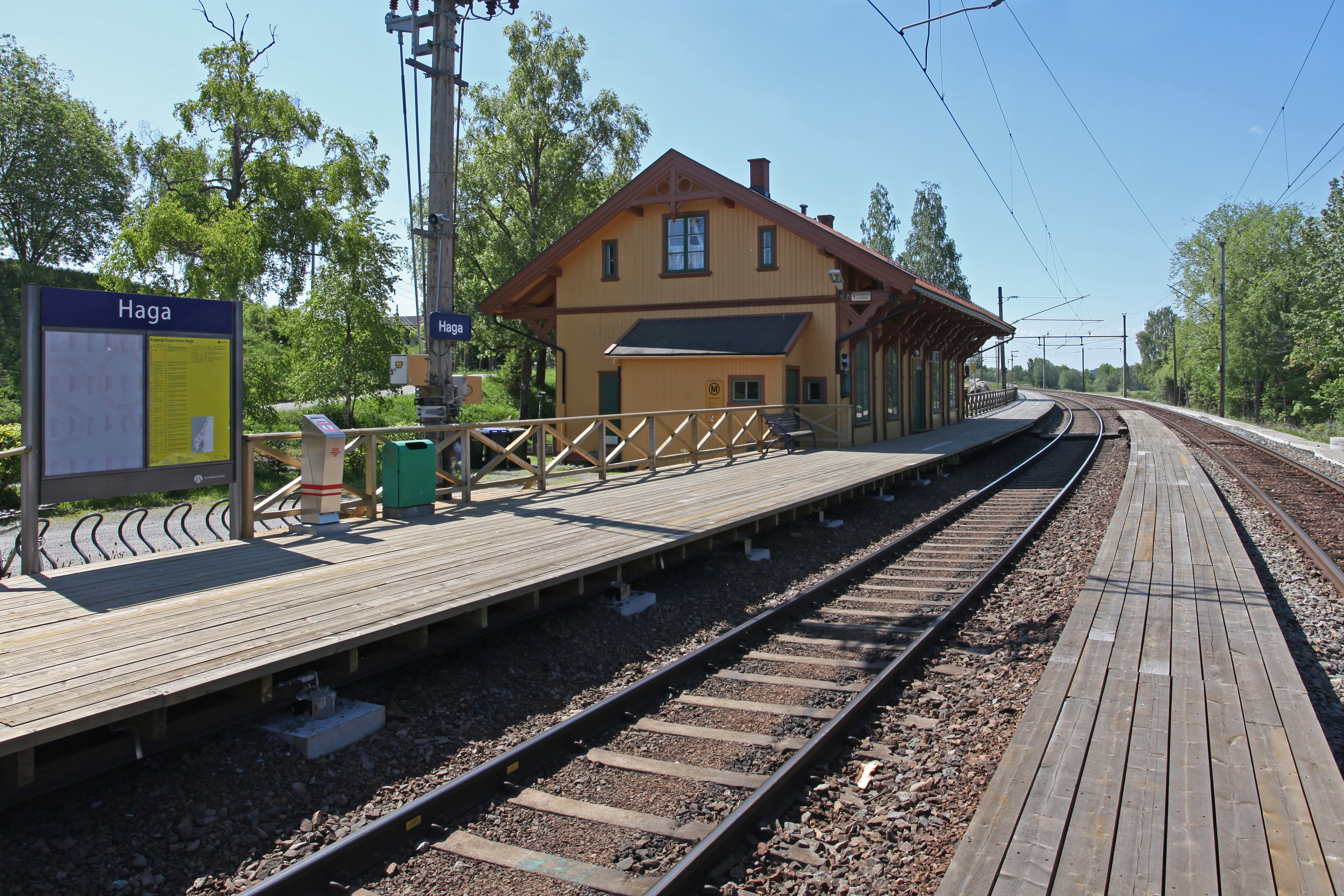

General information
- Location: Haga, Nes; Norway
- Coordinates: 60°03′14″N 11°22′23″E
- Elevation: 126.4 m (415 ft)
- Owner: Bane NOR
- Operator: Vy
- Line: Kongsvinger Line
- Distance: 48.87 km (30.37 mi)
- Platforms: 2
- Tracks: 2

History
- Opened: 3 October 1862; 163 years ago
Location
- Location within Akershus

Haga Station (Norwegian: Haga stasjon) is a railway station located in Haga in Nes, Norway on the Kongsvinger Line. The station was built in 1862 as part of the Kongsvinger Line. The station is served hourly, with extra rush hour departures, by the Oslo Commuter Rail line R14 operated by Vy.

Preceding station			Following station
Auli	Kongsvinger Line		Bodung
Preceding station	Local trains		Following station
Auli	R14	Asker–Oslo S–Kongsvinger	Bodung
