= Bodung =

- Village
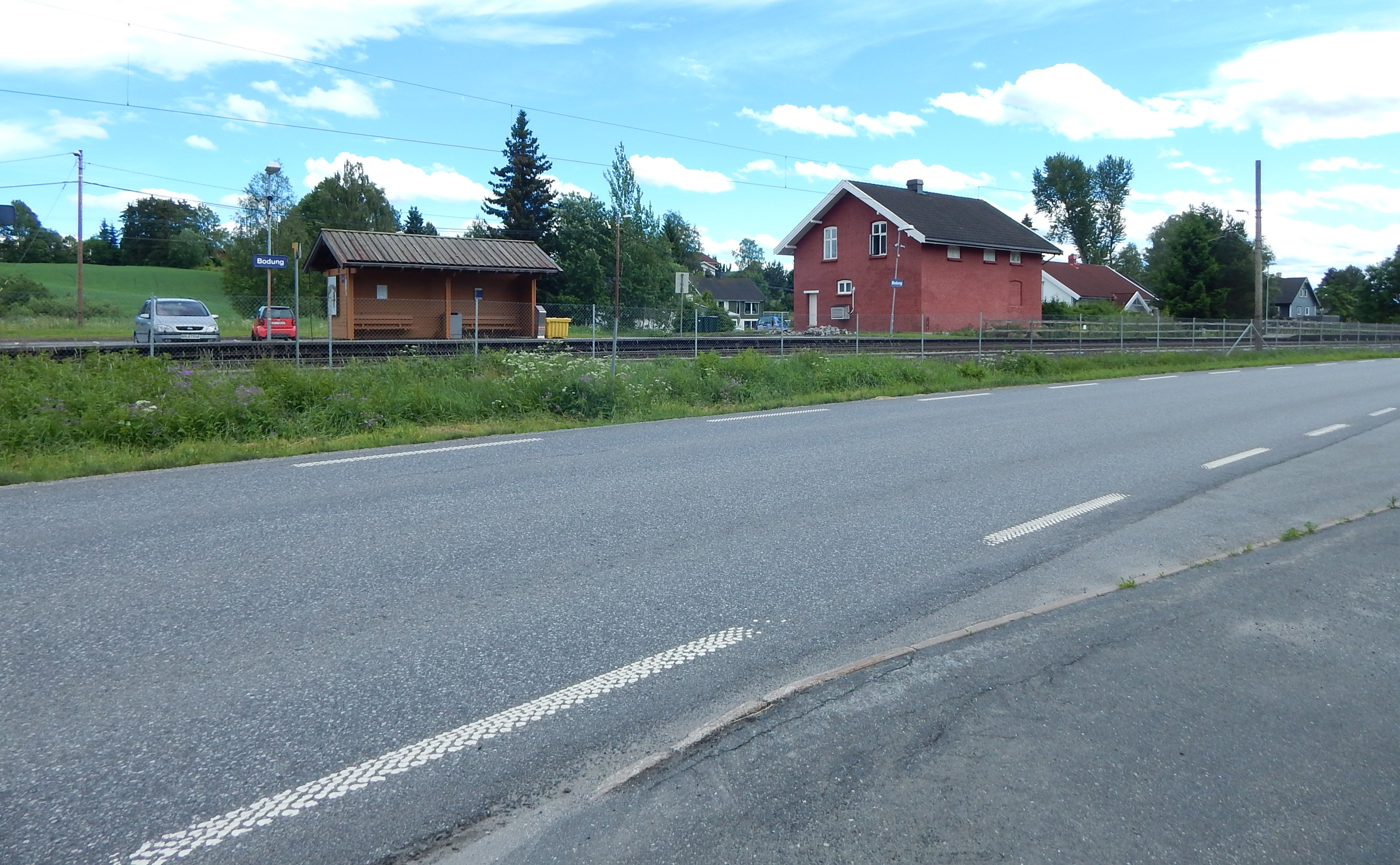
- Bodung stop on Kongsvingerbanen with county road 175 in the foreground

- Location within Akershus Location within Norway
- Coordinates: 60°05′07″N 11°25′13″E
- Country: Norway
- Region: Østlandet
- County: Akershus
- Municipality: Nes, Akershus
- Time zone: UTC+01:00 (CET)
  - Summer (DST): UTC+02:00 (CEST)

Bodung is a village in Akershus, Norway. It is a stop along Kongsvinger line between Lillestrøm and Årnes. Train service to Oslo S and Kongsvinger is provided during rush hour, only on weekdays.
