= Kongsvinger Line =

Norwegian railway line

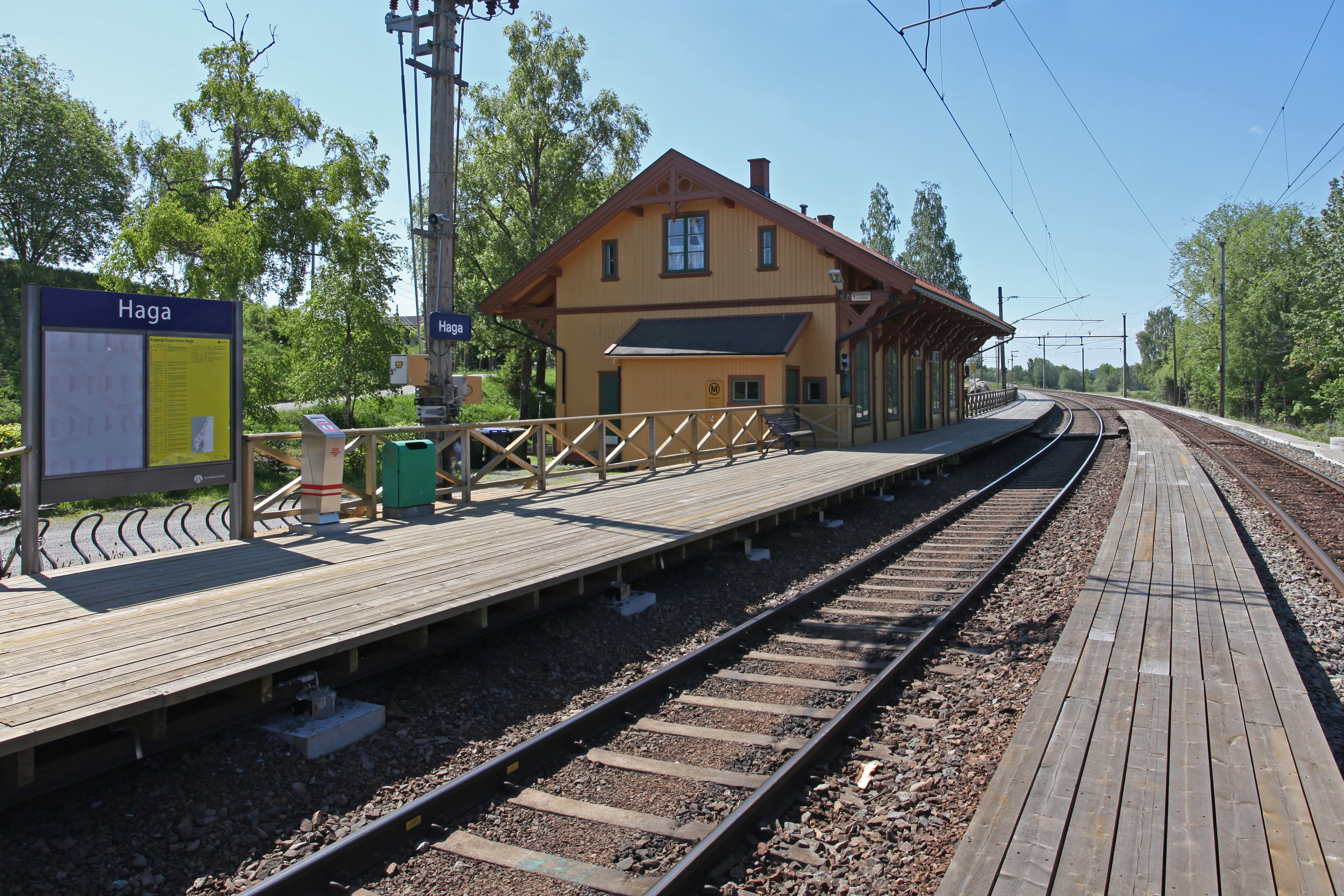
- Haga Railway Station

Overview
- Native name: Kongsvingerbanen
- Owner: Bane NOR
- Termini: Lillestrøm Station; Charlottenberg Station
- Stations: 20

Service
- Type: Railway
- System: Norwegian railway
- Operator(s): SJ; Vy; Vy Tåg; CargoNet
- Rolling stock: Class 75; Rc; Regina

History
- Opened: 1862

Technical
- Line length: 115 km
- Number of tracks: Single
- Character: Commuter trains Freight
- Track gauge: 1,435 mm (4 ft 8 1/2 in)
- Electrification: 15 kV 16.7 Hz AC

The Kongsvinger Line (Norwegian: Kongsvingerbanen) is a railway line between the towns of Lillestrøm and Kongsvinger in Norway and onwards to Charlottenberg in Sweden. The railway was opened on 3 October 1862 and is Norway's second standard gauge line (after the Hoved Line which opened on 1 September 1854). It was electrified in 1951. The line is owned by Bane NOR.

== The line ==
At Kongsvinger there is a junction, the main line turns south and continues to Charlottenberg in Sweden, while another line, the Solør Line—now closed for passenger traffic—runs northwards to Elverum. The entire stretch between Lillestrøm and Charlottenberg, is 115 km long.

At Sørumsand, an old narrow gauge heritage railway called Tertitten operates during the summer.

Passenger service on the Kongsvinger Line is operated mostly by electric multiple unit commuter trains which run between Oslo and Kongsvinger. Passenger service across the border was once frequent and operated by Linx to Stockholm and Kungspilen to Karlstad. However poor business caused these companies to cease operations after 2004. During 2005 and 2006, passenger service between Oslo and Stockholm still existed, but not on a daily basis.

Passenger service across the border is again frequent. Starting 7 January 2007 the Swedish national rail company SJ reinstated daily traffic on the route, although the train journeys are 90 minutes longer than Linx provided, partly because they stop at several stops in Norway and operate as local trains, allowing commuter tickets. The local traffic authority in Värmland operates trains with a similar traffic pattern between Oslo and Karlstad. They have connection with X 2000 high speed trains between Karlstad and Stockholm. The Swedish trains have between Oslo-Kongsvinger replaced some Norwegian local trains, and the Swedish operators get Norwegian funding, on the condition they operate like local trains in Norway.

After a suspension during the pandemic, during the Swedish timetable change in December 2021, SJ restarted daily services with three SJ Intercity departures, two in one direction and one in the other. These trains only stopped at Kongsvinger and Lillestrøm, otherwise speeding nonstop through stations served by local trains. After the next timetable change an exact year later in 2022, there were now 6 daily departures in total, some of which being with X55 express electric multiple units. Yet another year later in 2023, the amount of departures increased to a total of 8, while retaining the same train types used.

=== Stations ===
- Lillestrøm
- Tuen
- Nerdum
- Fetsund
- Svingen
- Guttersrud
- Sørumsand
- Blaker
- Rånåsfoss
- Auli
- Haga
- Bodung
- Årnes
- Seterstøa
- Disenå
- Skarnes
- Sander
- Galterud
- Kongsvinger
- Charlottenberg
