= Sørum =

Sørum Municipality Sørum kommune
- Former municipality
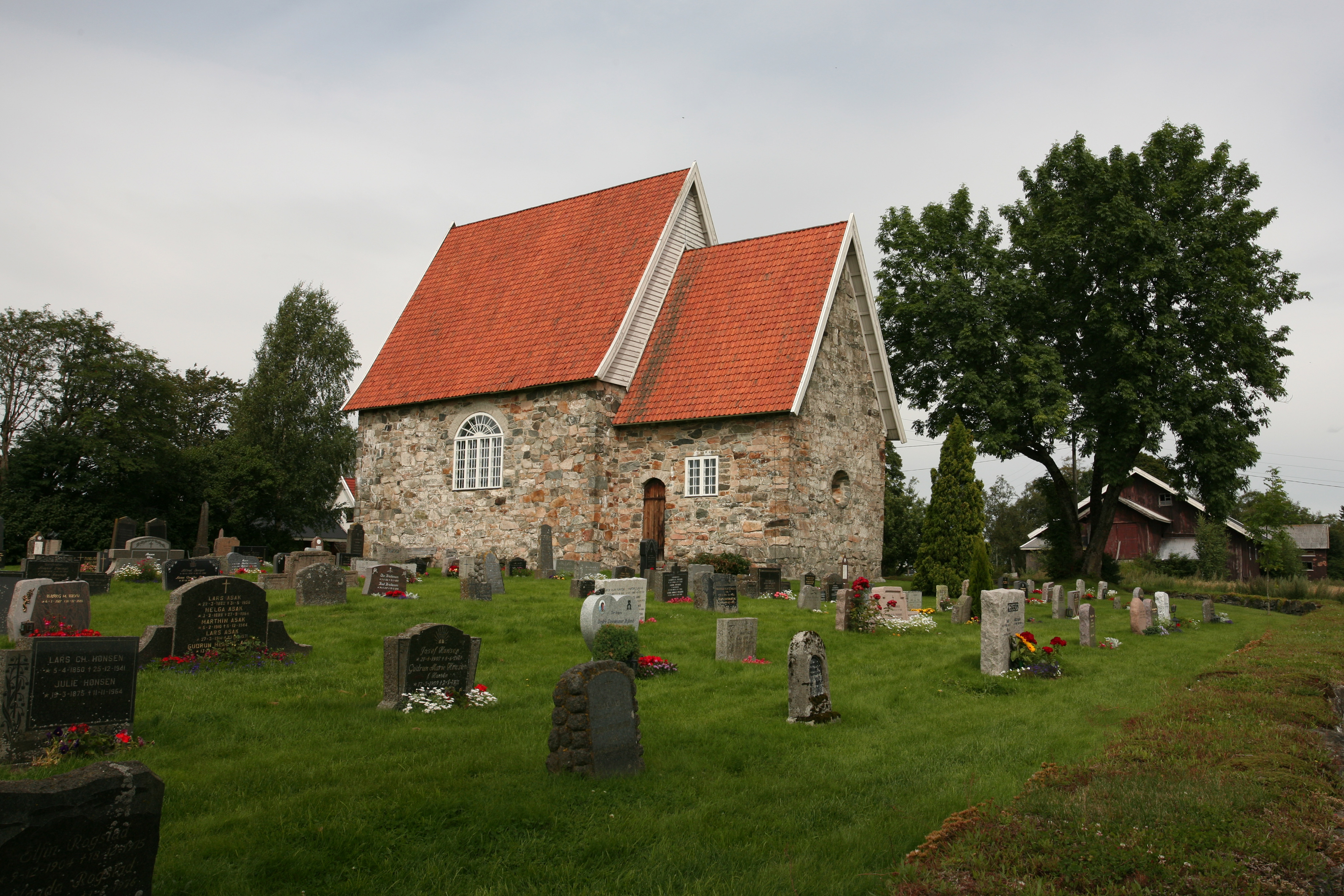
- Frogner Old Church

- Flag Coat of arms

- Akershus within Norway

- Sørum within Akershus
- Coordinates: 60°0′21″N 11°15′34″E
- Country: Norway
- County: Akershus
- District: Romerike
- Administrative centre: Sørumsand

Government
  - Mayor (2011): Are Tomasgaard (Ap)

Area (upon dissolution)
  - Total: 207 km^{2} (80 sq mi)
  - Land: 200 km^{2} (77 sq mi)
  - Rank: #327 in Norway

Population (2004)
  - Total: 12,768
  - Rank: #85 in Norway
  - Density: 64/km^{2} (170/sq mi)
  - Change (10 years): ▲ +12.7%
- Demonym: Sørumsokning

Official language
  - Norwegian form: Neutral
- Time zone: UTC+01:00 (CET)
  - Summer (DST): UTC+02:00 (CEST)
- ISO 3166 code: NO-0226
- Website: Official website

Sørum was a municipality in Akershus county, Norway. It is part of the traditional region of Romerike. The administrative centre of the municipality was the village of Sørumsand. Sørum was established as a municipality on 1 January 1838 (see formannskapsdistrikt). The municipality of Blaker was merged with Sørum on 1 January 1962.

Since 1 January 2020, Sørum has been part of Lillestrøm municipality.

== Frogner Old Church ==
Frogner Old Church (Frogner gamle kirke) dates from ca. 1180. It is part of the Norwegian Church and belongs to Østre Romerike deanery in Diocese of Borg.

The edifice is in stone and has 90 seats. The Medieval era church burned in 1918, the walls repaired in 1936, floors and ceilings in 1948. The restoration was completed in 1977.

== General information ==
=== Name ===
The municipality (originally the parish) is named after the old Sørum farm (Old Norse: Suðrheimr), since the first church was built here. The first element is suðr which means "southern" and the last element is heimr which means "home/homestead" or "farm".

=== Coat-of-arms ===
The coat-of-arms is from modern times. They were granted on 26 June 1981. The arms show a red rose with five petals on a yellow background. The rose is derived from the arms of the medieval dynasty of Sudreim (Sudreimsætten), one of the most influential noble families in Norway at the time. Their name was derived from what is now known as Sørum.

Number of minorities (1st and 2nd generation) in Sørum by country of origin in 2017
Ancestry	Number
Poland	532
Lithuania	362
Sweden	185
Pakistan	169
Sri Lanka	139
Iran	117
Germany	114
Denmark	88
Thailand	86
Afghanistan	79

== Geography ==
Sørum municipality was located in the central part of Akershus county. To the north Sørum bordered the municipality of Ullensaker, to the east Nes and Aurskog-Høland, in the south Fet, and the west Skedsmo and Gjerdrum.

== Sister cities ==
The following cities were twinned with Sørum:

- – Hagfors, Värmland County, Sweden
