= Fet Municipality =

Fet Municipality Fet kommune
- Former municipality
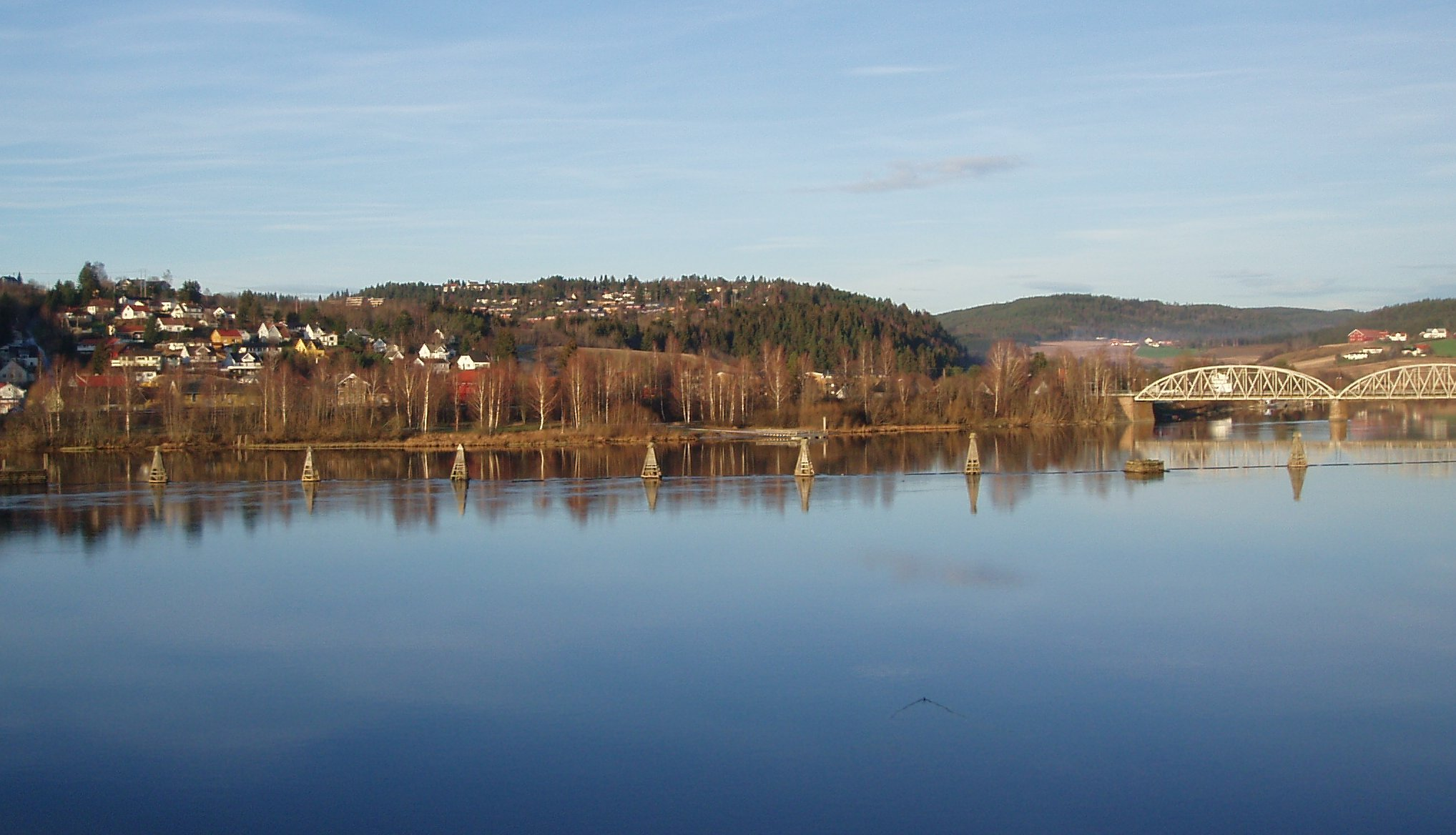

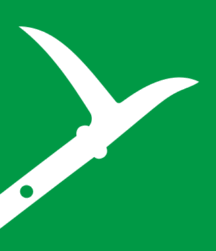
- Flag Coat of arms

- Akershus within Norway

- Fet within Akershus
- Coordinates: 59°52′47″N 11°13′14″E
- Country: Norway
- County: Akershus
- District: Romerike
- Administrative centre: Fetsund

Government
  - Mayor (2005): Lisbet Lofthus Gabrielsen (Ap)

Area (upon dissolution)
  - Total: 176 km^{2} (68 sq mi)
  - Land: 137 km^{2} (53 sq mi)
  - Rank: #347 in Norway

Population (2004)
  - Total: 9,485
  - Rank: #108 in Norway
  - Density: 69/km^{2} (180/sq mi)
  - Change (10 years): ▲ +10.5%
- Demonym: Fetsokning

Official language
  - Norwegian form: Bokmål
- Time zone: UTC+01:00 (CET)
  - Summer (DST): UTC+02:00 (CEST)
- ISO 3166 code: NO-0227
- Website: Official website

Fet was a municipality in Akershus county, Norway. It was part of the Romerike traditional region. The administrative centre of the municipality is the village of Fetsund.

Fet was established as a municipality on 1 January 1838 (see formannskapsdistrikt). The new municipality of Rælingen was separated from Fet on 1 July 1929. The part of Enebakk municipality lying east of lake Øyeren was transferred to Fet in 1962. On 1 January 2020 Fet was merged with Skedsmo and Sørum municipalities to form Lillestrøm municipality.

== General information ==
=== Name ===
The name (Old Norse: Fit) was first recorded in 1321 (a Fit). The word fit means 'vigorous meadow'.

=== Coat-of-arms ===
The coat-of-arms is from modern times. They were granted on 19 December 1986. The arms show a logging hook, which was used in the area to haul the logs cut in the surrounding forests. The logs were transported over the streams and lakes to the sawmills. The people used long poles with hooks to haul the logs. The colours of the arms are green and silver because the name is derived from an old word describing a field (green) near a lake (silver).

Number of minorities (1st and 2nd generation) in Fet by country of origin in 2017
Ancestry	Number
Poland	455
Lithuania	167
Sweden	105
Germany	79
Sri Lanka	73
Pakistan	72
Denmark	67
Vietnam	67

== Geography ==
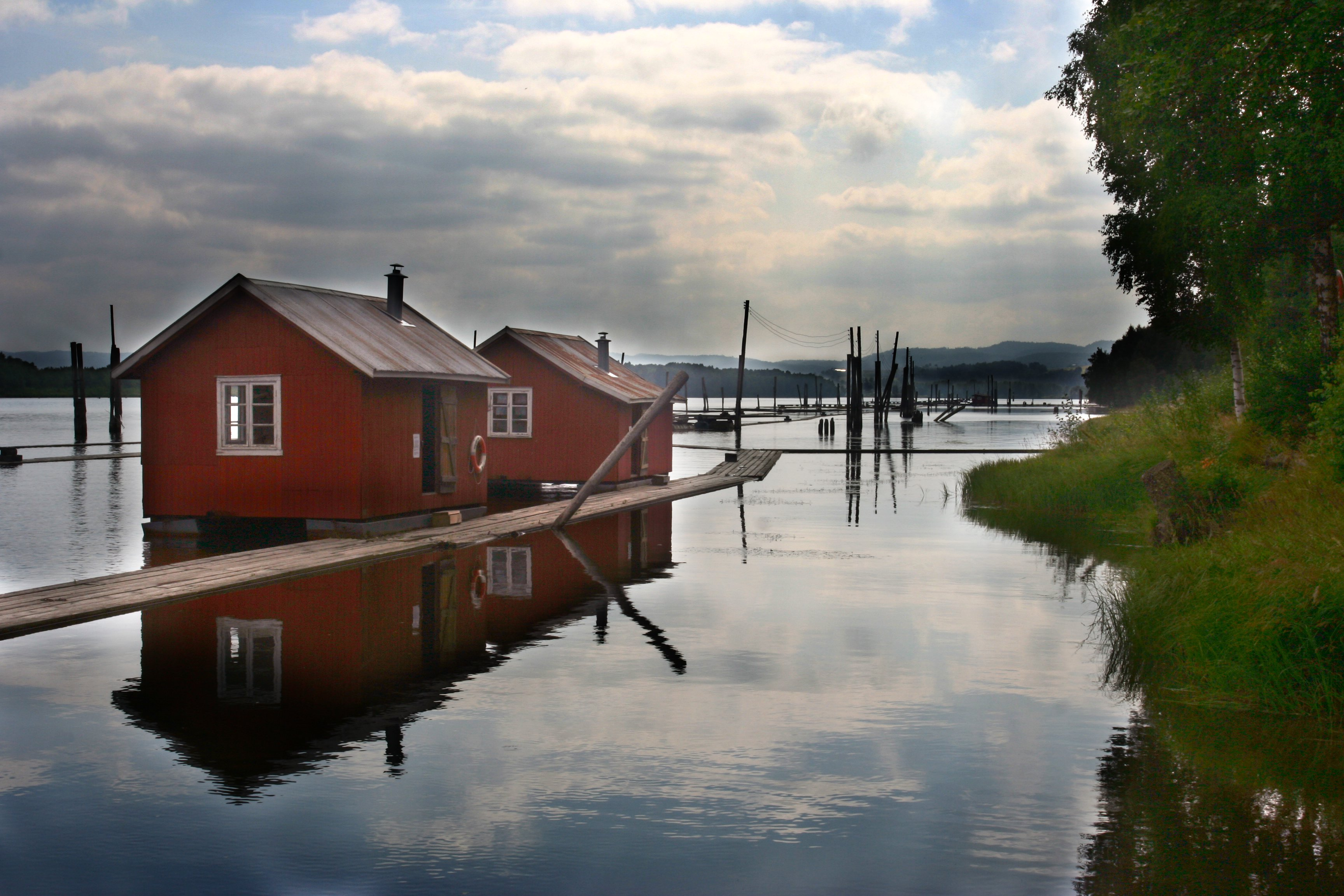
Logging museum on the water

Fet is located on the eastern side of Lake Øyeren and includes the point at which the River Glomma enters the lake. The inland river delta that has formed is the largest in Europe and reaches the opposite shore of the lake, across its short axis. Until 1985, logs floated down the river were brought onshore here before the river entered its delta, and were then transported onwards by rail. Today, many of Fet's floating buildings have been preserved and converted into a museum and cultural centre.

== Notable residents ==
- Jacob Aall Ottesen (1825–1904), Norwegian American minister, theologian, and church leader.
