= Fetsund =

- Village
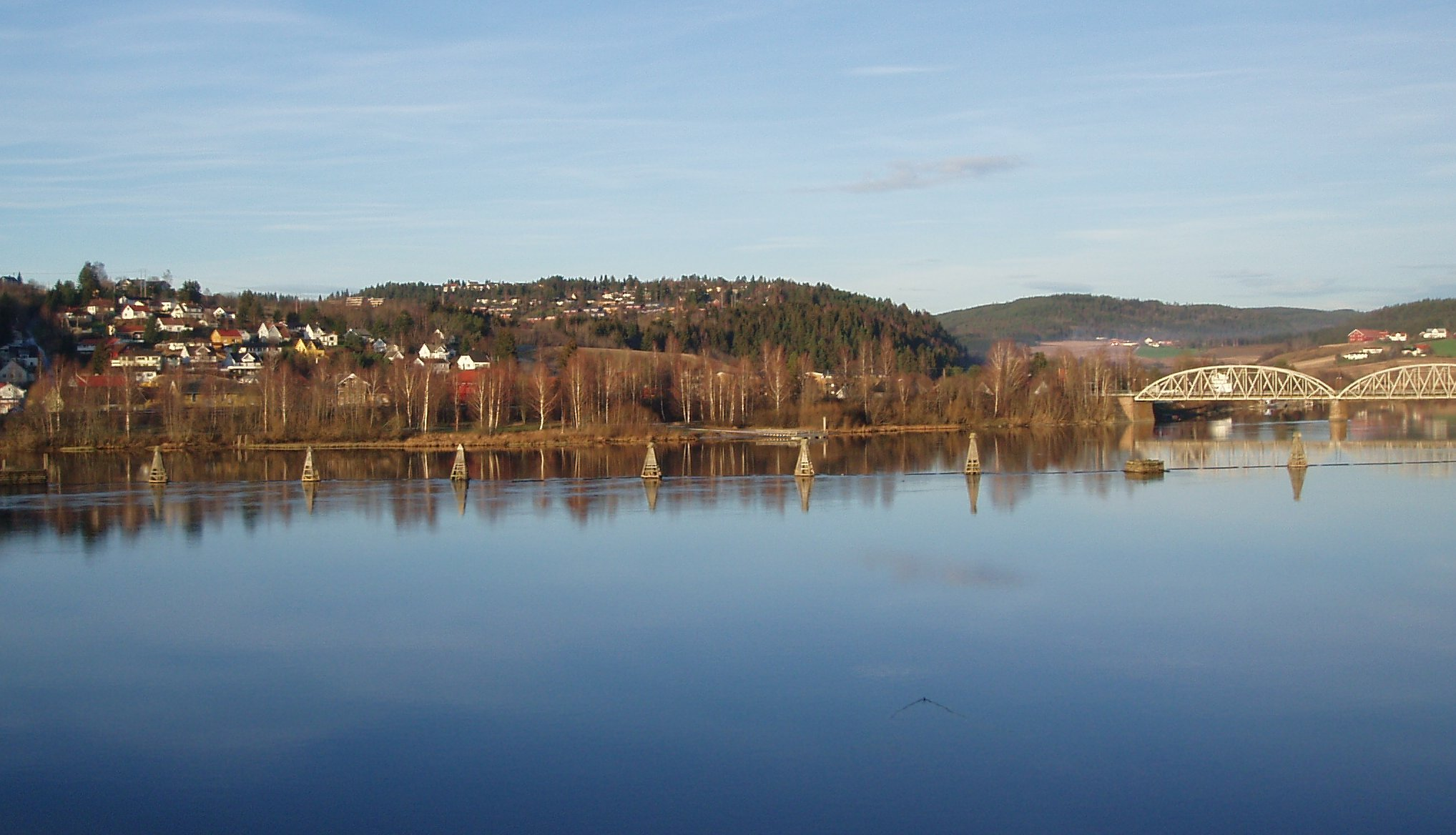

- Location within Akershus Location within Norway
- Coordinates: 59°55′44″N 11°9′45″E
- Country: Norway
- County: Akershus
- Municipality: Lillestrøm
- Time zone: UTC+1 (CET)
  - Summer (DST): UTC+2 (CEST)

Fetsund is a village in the municipality Lillestrøm, Akershus, Norway. The name comes from the local geography, Fet means "where water meets grass". As for the -sund part, it simply means 'strait, inlet'. Accordingly, Fetsund is located at the strait of Glomma, Norway's largest river, just before it enters Øyeren nature reservation, and this is the place the logging industry in years past pulled the logs out of the water for transport to steam sawmills.

Today, Fetsund and its surrounding area is a small town and is mainly a residential area with very little industry. The old log industry is gone, but its buildings and site is still preserved as a national museum, Fetsund Lenser. Fetsund's close proximity to Lillestrøm and the nation's capital, Oslo, have contributed to the town growing much larger in recent years. Its small-town qualities, low population density, and closeness to the capital, makes it a preferred place to live.

Fetsund's history dates back to the ancient kings' road going from the medieval town of Oslo towards the neighbouring country Sweden. As Fetsund was the shortest distance by ferry or boat over the river Glomma, the place naturally grew into the urbanized area it is today. Now there are two bridges in Fetsund spanning the Glomma, and it is still the only crossing within the area.

Fetsund has a church with an altarpiece dating from the 17th century.

Fetsund's railway station was built in the 1860s, which still stands today and is used by people working in Oslo and to a lesser extent Lillestrøm.

== Trivia ==
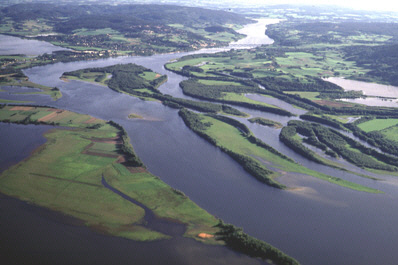
Øyeren nature reservation

Fetsund and its municipality is often referred as 'the green municipality', but mostly by the city's officials and in brochures. Jan Stenerud, Pro Football Hall of Fame inductee, is a native.
