= Kongsvinger Station =

Railway station in Kongsvinger, Norway

Kongsvinger
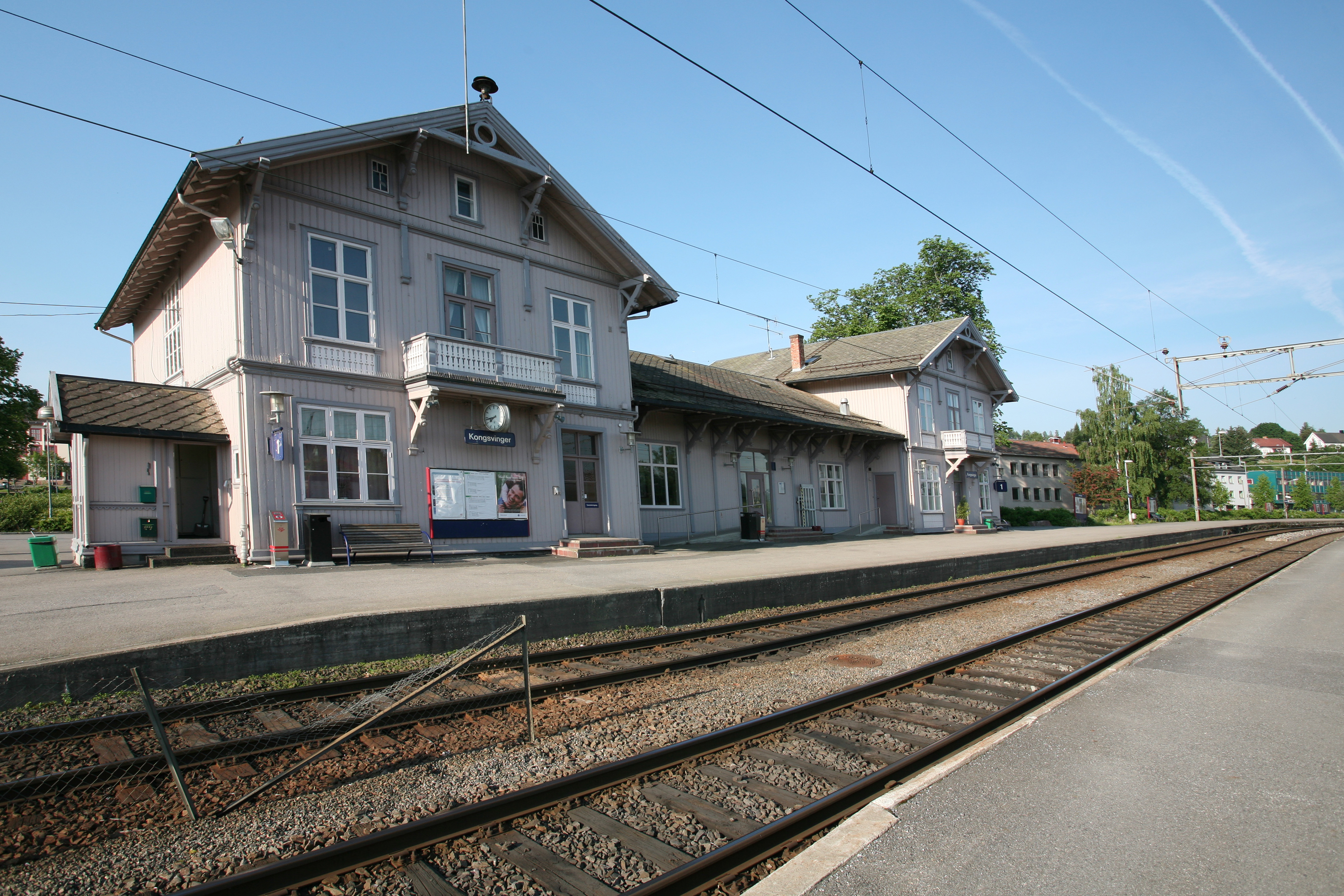

General information
- Location: Kongsvinger, Norway
- Coordinates: 60°11′15″N 12°0′13″E
- Elevation: 148.1 m (486 ft) AMSL
- Operator: SJ; Vy; Vy Tåg
- Lines: Kongsvinger Line; Solør Line
- Distance: 100.28 km (62.31 mi)
- Platforms: 2
- Connections: Bus: Innlandstrafikk

Other information
- Station code: KVG

History
- Opened: 3 October 1862; 163 years ago
Location

Kongsvinger Station (Norwegian: Kongsvinger stasjon) is a railway station located in downtown Kongsvinger in Kongsvinger Municipality in Innlandet county, Norway, on the Kongsvinger Line and Solør Line. The station was built in 1862 as part of the Kongsvinger Lin and designed in Swiss chalet style by Heinrich Ernst Schirmer and Wilhelm von Hanno. Later a branch line, the Solør Line, was built to Elverum.

The station is served by many Oslo Commuter Rail departures to and from Oslo Central Station. There are also stops by long-distance trains Oslo–Stockholm, and some regional trains to Charlottenberg and Karlstad in Sweden.

All bus services in Kongsvinger connect to the station, with hourly service offered by Innlandstrafikk. There are hourly buses westbound to Oslo, northbound to Elverum, and buses to Charlottenberg, and local buses in Kongsvinger.

The restaurant was taken over by Norsk Spisevognselskap on 1 July 1925, and subsequently renovated.

| Preceding station | | | Following station |
|---|---|---|---|
| Skarnes | Kongsvinger Line | | — |
| — | Solør Line | | Elverum |
| Preceding station | Express trains | | Following station |
| Lillestrøm | F1 | Oslo S–Stockholm C | Arvika |
| Preceding station | Local trains | | Following station |
| Skarnes | R14 | Asker–Oslo S–Kongsvinger | — |
