= Fetsund Battery =

Artillery battery in Fetsund, Norway

Coordinates: 59°55′45″N 11°09′19″E

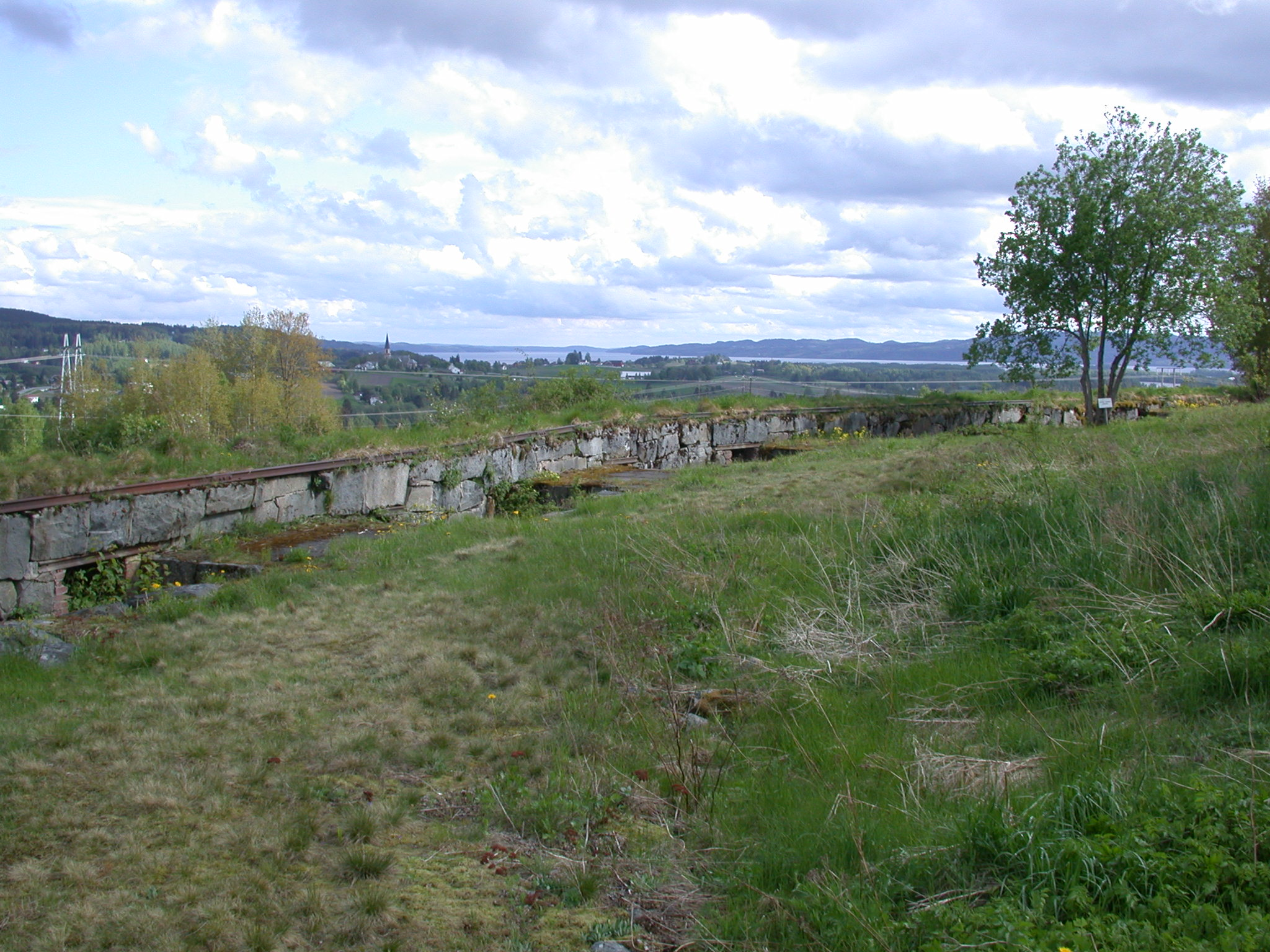
View from the Fetsund Battery to the south. In the foreground: firing positions, covered chambers with ammunition niches in the parapet, and the parapet topped by a railway rail.

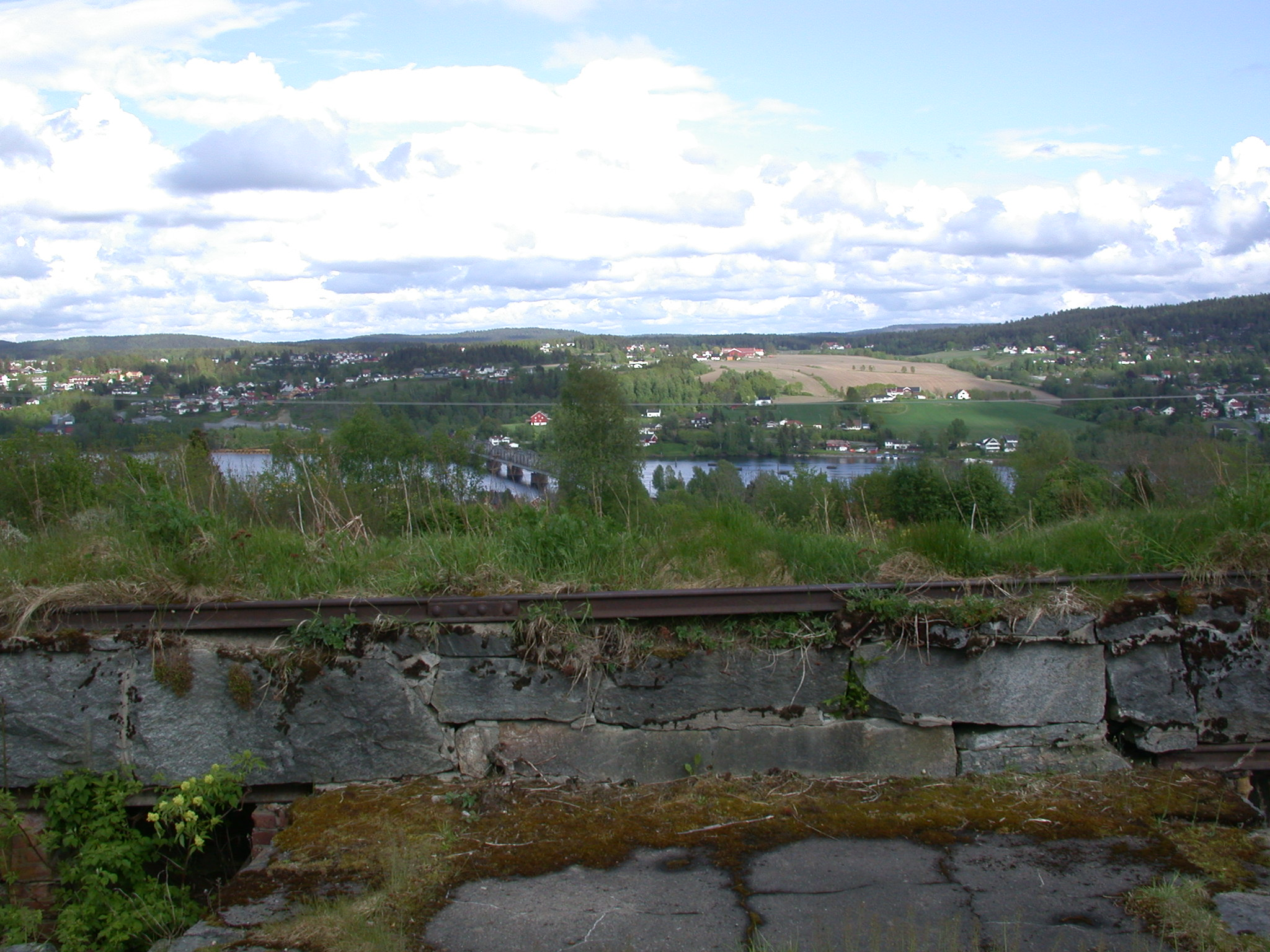
View over the parapet toward the Fetsund Bridge, a combined rail and road bridge that the battery protected.

The Fetsund Battery (Norwegian: Fetsund batteri or Fetsundbatteriet) is an artillery battery in Fetsund in Akershus county, Norway. Locally, the battery is also known as Vilbergfestningen 'the Vilberg fortress'.

As part of the arming of Norway and the Glomma Line in the years up to 1905, a battery was installed in Fetsund for four Ehrhardt 7.5 cm and four Cockerill-Nordenfeldt Model 1904 10.5 cm field cannons from the Norwegian Field Artillery (Norwegian: Posisjonsartilleriet). The installation was started in December 1898 and was completed in April 1900. It is located on the Vilberg farm on a hill west of Fetsund Station. Below the Fetsund Battery, a forward battery was built during the same period, the Høgås Battery at Fjellsrud.

The battery is designed as a long arch with a low parapet with ammunition niches and shallow covered chambers for the crew. Behind the battery's left wing stood a small ammunition building, which no longer exists.

From the battery there is a broad view of the center of Fetsund and the east side of the Glomma River. The purpose of the battery was to prevent any military advances southward from Sørumsand or northward from Fjellsrud crossing the Glomma over the Fetsund rail and road bridge. At that time, these were the only two roads from the east. County Road 170 from Aurskog was built in the 1960s after the closure of the Urskog–Høland Line.

On September 13, 1905, mobilization orders were issued, and the Fetsund and Høgås batteries were manned with 1,450 men from the Valdres Battalion and a squadron of militia dragoons. This is the only time the battery was mobilized.

== Depot camp ==
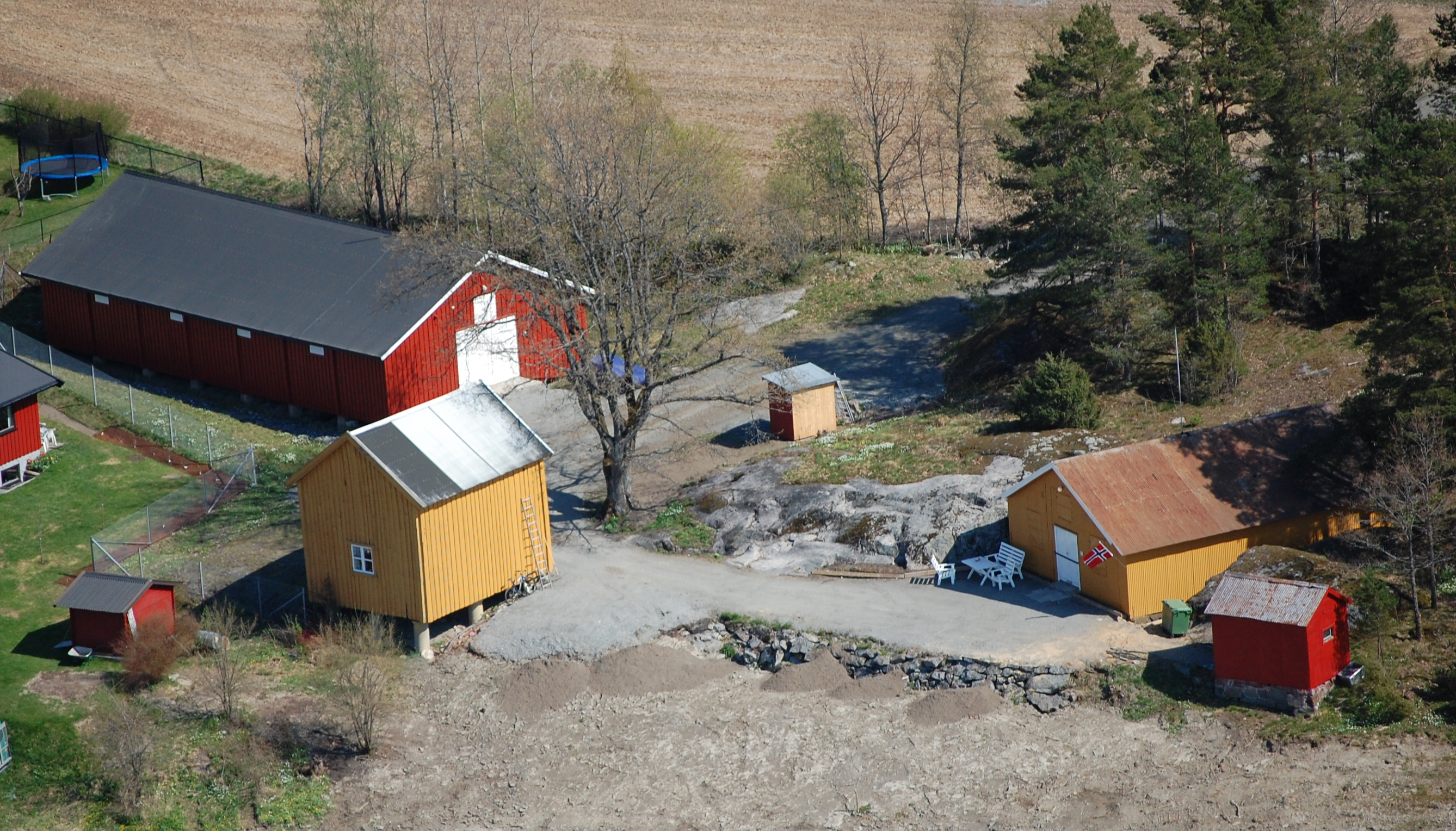
Cannon shed (red building to the right), arsenal building (two stories, to the left), ammunition shed (in the middle), and armory at far right.

In a sheltered area behind the hillside there are several storage buildings belonging to the battery. There is a cannon shed, an ammunition shed, an armory, and a regimental arsenal building that was moved here from Enebakk Church in 1907. The fact that the battery's buildings still exist and are close to their original condition makes the Fetsund Battery unique among Norway's smaller border fortifications.

== Later use ==
The battery area originally extended a considerable distance forward from the battery itself in order to provide a free line of fire. When the battery no longer had any military value, the land below the battery was returned to the Vilberg farm for agricultural use, and the area between the battery and Garderveien (Farm Road) was assigned to the Armed Forces. Military buildings were built there.

The facility was used by the Germans during the Second World War as a warehouse for aviation fuel. German soldiers were quartered at the Vilberg farm, located between the battery and the depot camp. Non-commissioned officers were accommodated on the second floor of the main house, and privates in a smaller house north of the farmyard. To the left, at the gate of the depot camp, there is the foundation of a smaller building. Its layout indicates that this may have been a guardhouse from the German occupation. Any small arms, equestrian equipment, and remaining cannons have been removed from the site.

== Bridge material ==
The protection plan for the Fetsund Battery states that one of the buildings in the depot camp was used for storage of prefabricated military bridge material and another was used for ammunition storage. However, the plan is not clear and it confuses Buildings 0003 and 0004 in its text and images. Building 0003 is located in a blasted-out recess, whereas Building 0004 is small and exposed. It can be assumed that Building 0003 was used for ammunition storage.

It is not clear whether the site was originally planned for storing bridge materials when it was established, or if this use of the depot camp was made at a later date. During the 1980s, material for a prefabricated pontoon bridge of American make for crossing the Glomma was stored partly at the installation and partly in the buildings in the depot camp. This pontoon bridge was previously stored over an extended time at Stasjonsstranda next to Fetsund Station.

The property received protected status on May 6, 2004 and is regulated for public purposes. It was transferred from the Armed Forces to Municipality of Fet for NOK 50,000 in 2008. The depot camp has now been refurbished and is being rented out. With the refurbishment, the roofing of two of the buildings was changed from the original rounded corrugated panels to modern aluminum panels with a trapezoidal corrugated profile. This has reduced the visual authenticity of the protected buildings.
