= Bingen Booms =

Coordinates: 59°58′58″N 11°12′34″E

Video clip of the Bingen Booms

The Bingen Booms (Norwegian: Bingen lenser) is a system of log booms on the Glomma River below Sørumsand in the municipality of Sørum, Norway. The first boom system at the site may have already been built in the 14th century, and was certainly in place by the 16th century. At the booms, timber was sorted and bundled before it was driven down the Glomma River and distributed to sawmills on the shore of Lake Øyeren.

A railway bridge across the Glomma River in Fetsund was built in 1861. This created an obstacle for log driving, and the sorting infrastructure was moved downriver to Fetsund. At Bingen, catch booms were set up; this was a system of large stone piers and booms that held the timber back. From here, loose timber was released downriver to Fetsund.

Log driving on the Glomma River came to an end in 1985, and for a long time the Bingen Booms were poorly maintained. The Bingen Booms Heritage Society was established in 2011.

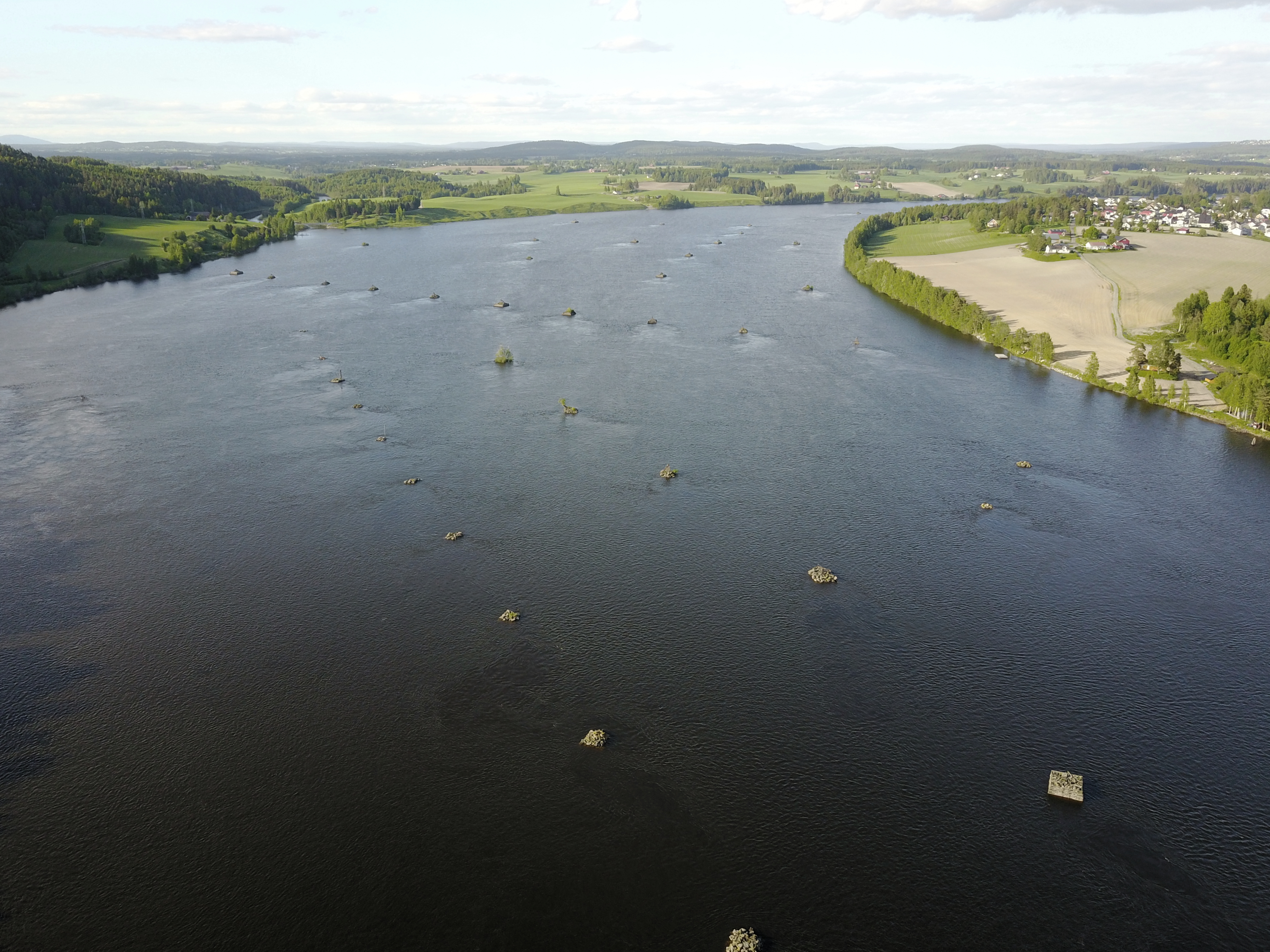
The booms, facing north toward Sørumsand

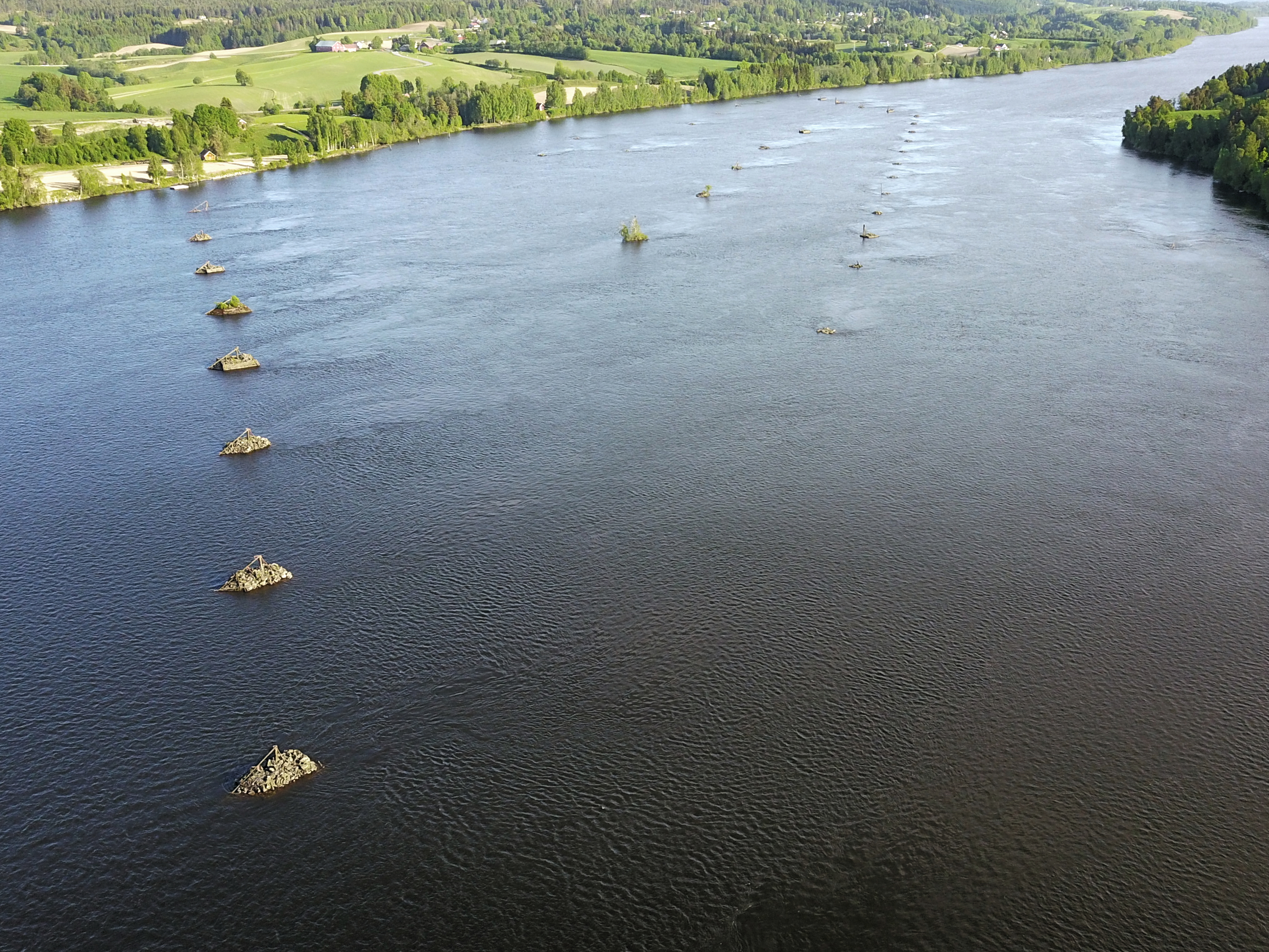
The booms, facing south toward Fetsund

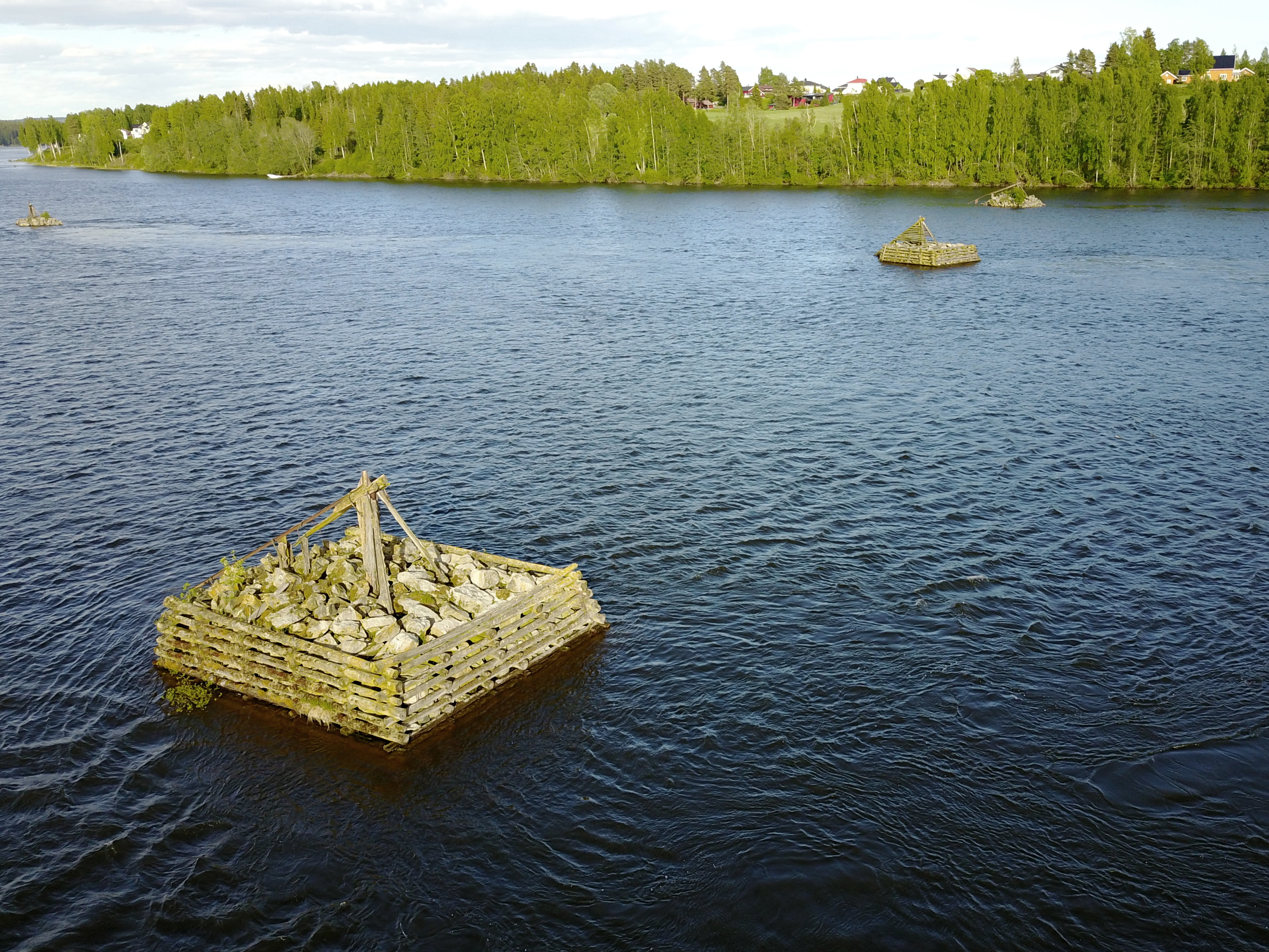
One of the stone piers in the river
