= Fetsund Booms =

Norwegian national cultural heritage site

Coordinates: 59°55′18″N 11°09′07″E

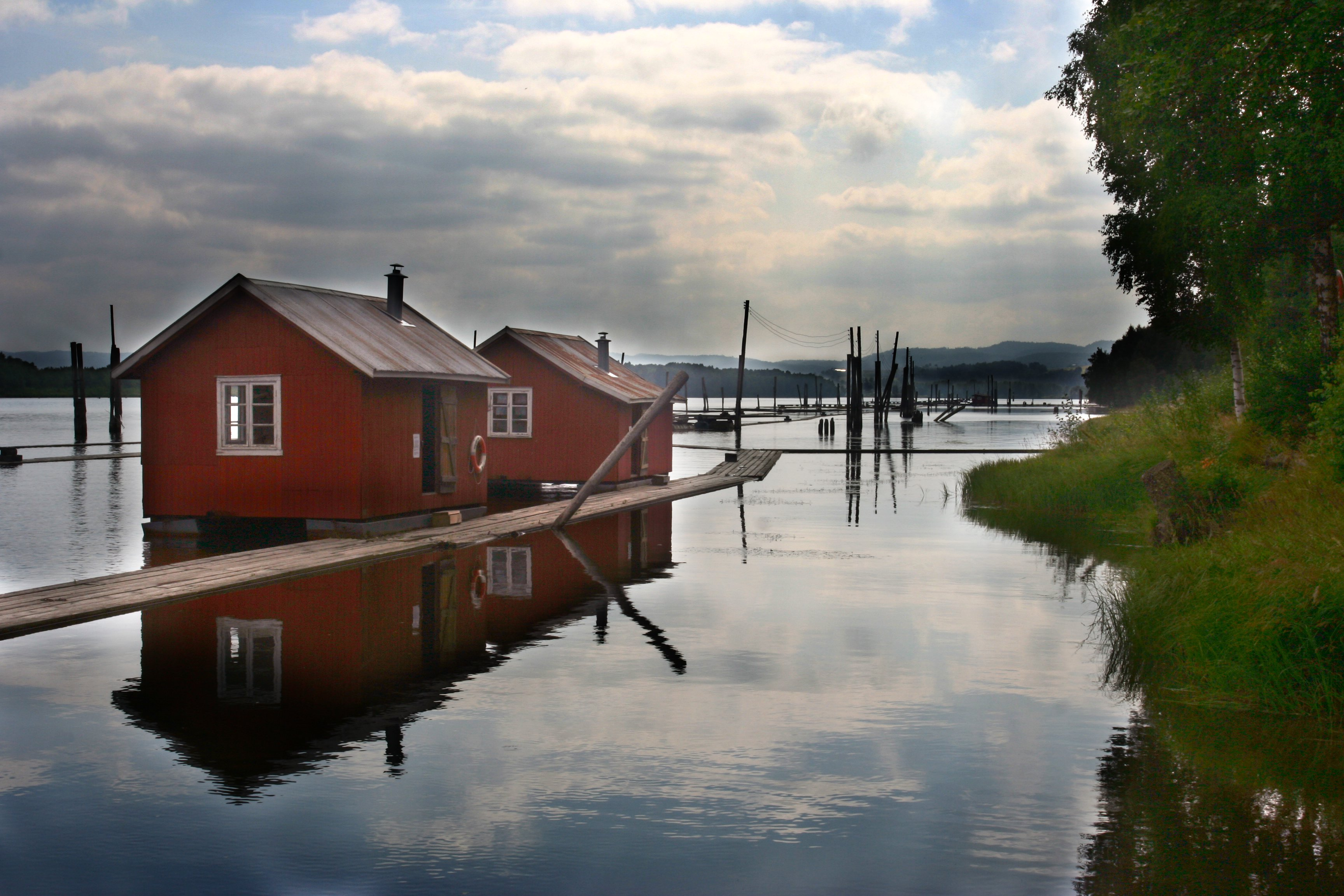
The Boom Museum at Fetsund is a cultural heritage monument at the outlet of the Glomma River into Lake Øyeren.

The Fetsund Booms (Norwegian: Fetsund Lenser) are a Norwegian national cultural heritage monument, log driving museum, and wetland center at the outlet of the Glomma River into Lake Øyeren in Lillestrøm municipality in Akershus county. The Fetsund Booms were set up as a timber sorting facility in 1861 and operated until 1985, when log driving came to an end on the Glomma River. Today the facility is part of the Akershus Museum.

The millennium site for the former municipality of Fet is located next to the Vinkelen building at the facility. It is a flood marker in the form of a stone about 7 meters (23 ft) high with markings to record the highest flood levels on the Glomma River.

== History ==
Log driving on the Glomma River began in the 1300s, but increased when frame saws were introduced in the 16th century. In the beginning, the timber was tied together in the Glomma River at the Bingen Booms at Sørumsand. From there, the timber rafts were towed by boats to the many sawmills along the lake and in Lillestrøm. When the railway bridge in Fetsund was built in 1861, the booms at Bingen were moved to Fetsund. At Bingen, catch booms were set up that could release timber as needed at Fetsund.

Today the Fetsund Booms are protected as Norway's only remaining log-driving facility. The Fetsund Booms are also believed to be the only preserved log-driving facility of their kind in the world. They are preserved as outstanding cultural heritage and a living museum with workshops for traditional crafts, cafes, and museum shops. The Fetsund Booms are located in an attractive natural area at the entrance to northern Europe's largest inland delta. There is also a nature trail with cultural highlights in the area.
