= Vardåsen (Enebakk) =

Hill in Enebakk, Norway

Coordinates: 59°47′49″N 11°07′11″E

Vardåsen is a hill and the highest point in the municipality of Enebakk, Norway. It is located between the two lakes Børtervann and Øyeren, and has a height of 374 m.a.s.l.
