= Fetsund Bridge =

Road and railway bridge in Lillestrøm, Norway

Coordinates: 59°55′42″N 11°10′15″E

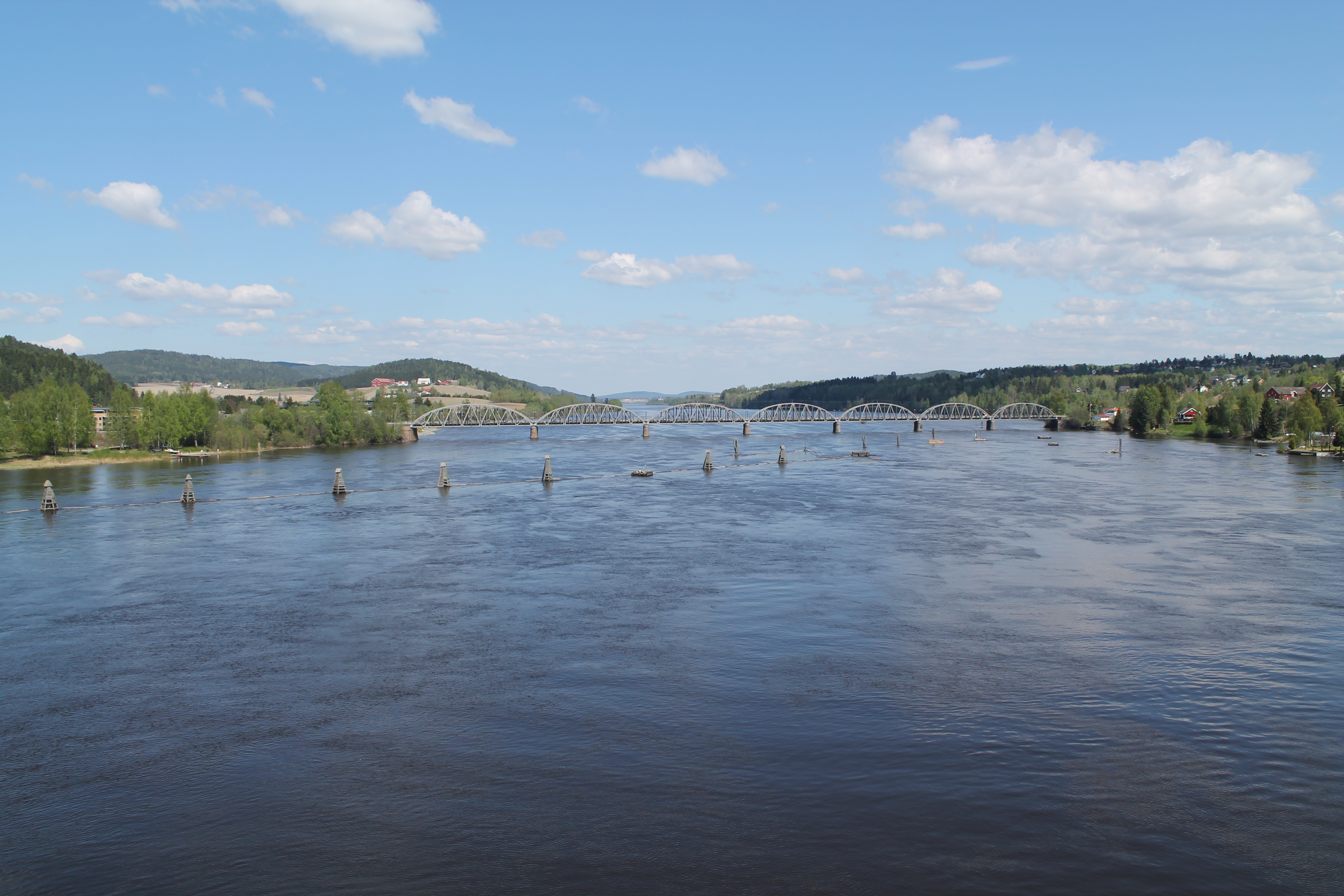
Fetsund railway bridge

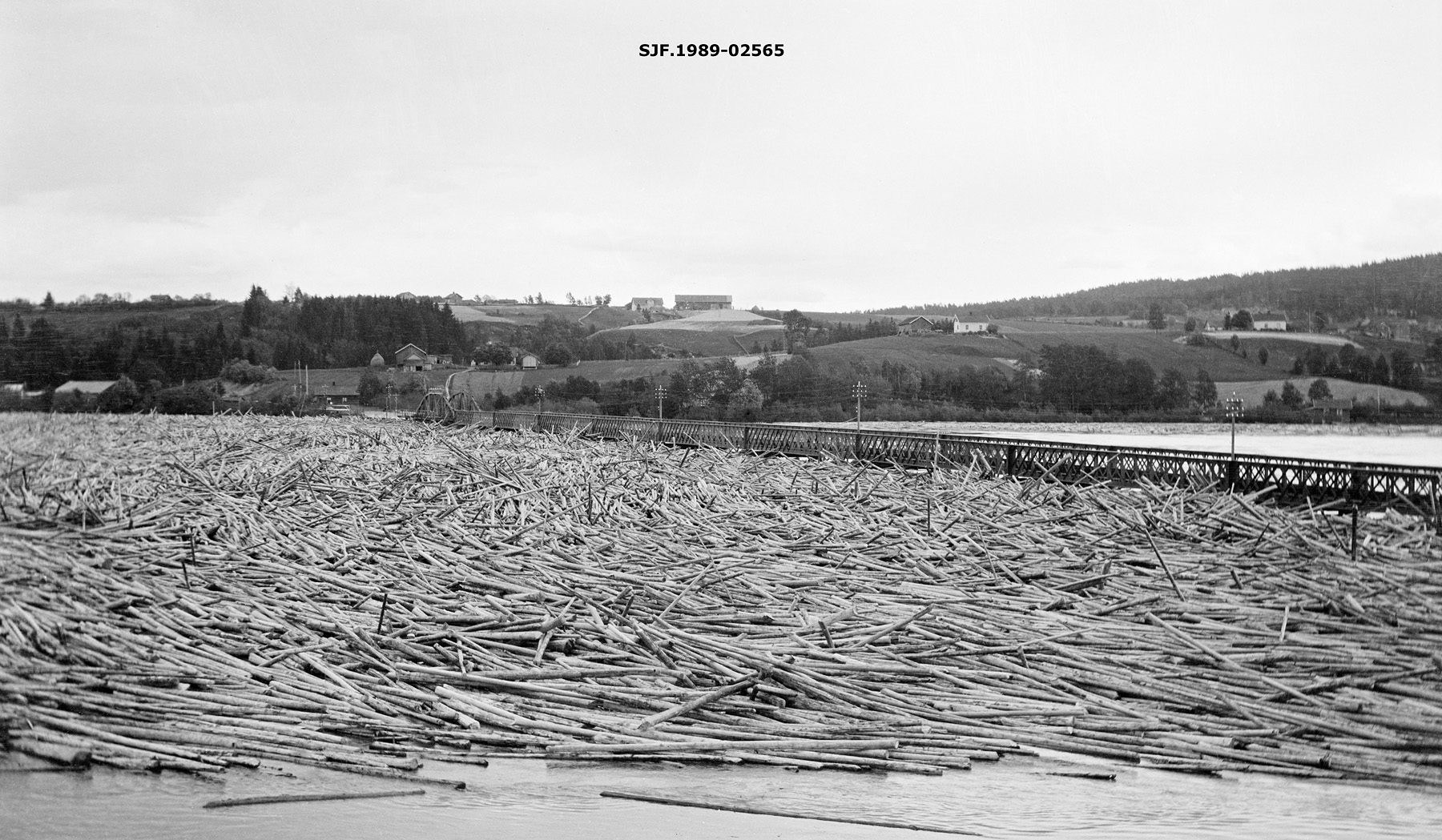
Timber at Fetsund Bridge in 1910

The Fetsund Bridge (Norwegian: Fetsund bru) refers to two bridges: a road bridge and a railway bridge that cross the Glomma River at Fetsund in the municipality of Lillestrøm in Akershus county, Norway.

The first bridge, a wooden structure, was built in 1860 for the Kongsvinger Line. The municipalities of Fet and Høland split the cost of a road for horses and carts on the downstream side of the bridge. In 1877 the bridge was rebuilt, and the wooden pilings were replaced with stone.

The construction of the bridge led to the Bingen Booms at Sørumsand being relocated to Fetsund. After some time, it turned out that the old bridge could lead to large flows of timber clogging when being driven on the river. This led to the construction of a new and higher bridge a few dozen meters upstream from the old wooden bridge. The new railway bridge was made of steel with seven spans, each approximately 60 meters (200 ft) long. This bridge, with a length of 420 meters (1,380 ft), was opened in 1919. This was built as a combined rail and road bridge with a lane on either side. When a new road bridge was later built, the roadways on the 1919 bridge were closed to cars in 1959, and the upstream roadway was converted to use as a walking and cycling route. In the 1980s, both roadways were removed and a narrow footbridge was installed on the north side. This marked the end of one of the last combined rail and road bridges in Norway.

To protect the approach to the old railway bridge, the Fetsund Battery was installed on the slope west of the bridge in 1898.

After the Second World War, a prefabricated pontoon bridge was stored at Stasjonsstranda, between the bridges, for many years.

The New Fetsund Bridge for National Road 22 was opened on December 12, 1959 a few hundred meters downstream from the railway bridge.
