= Enebakk Church =

Coordinates: 59°45′43″N 11°8′48″E

- Enebakk kirke
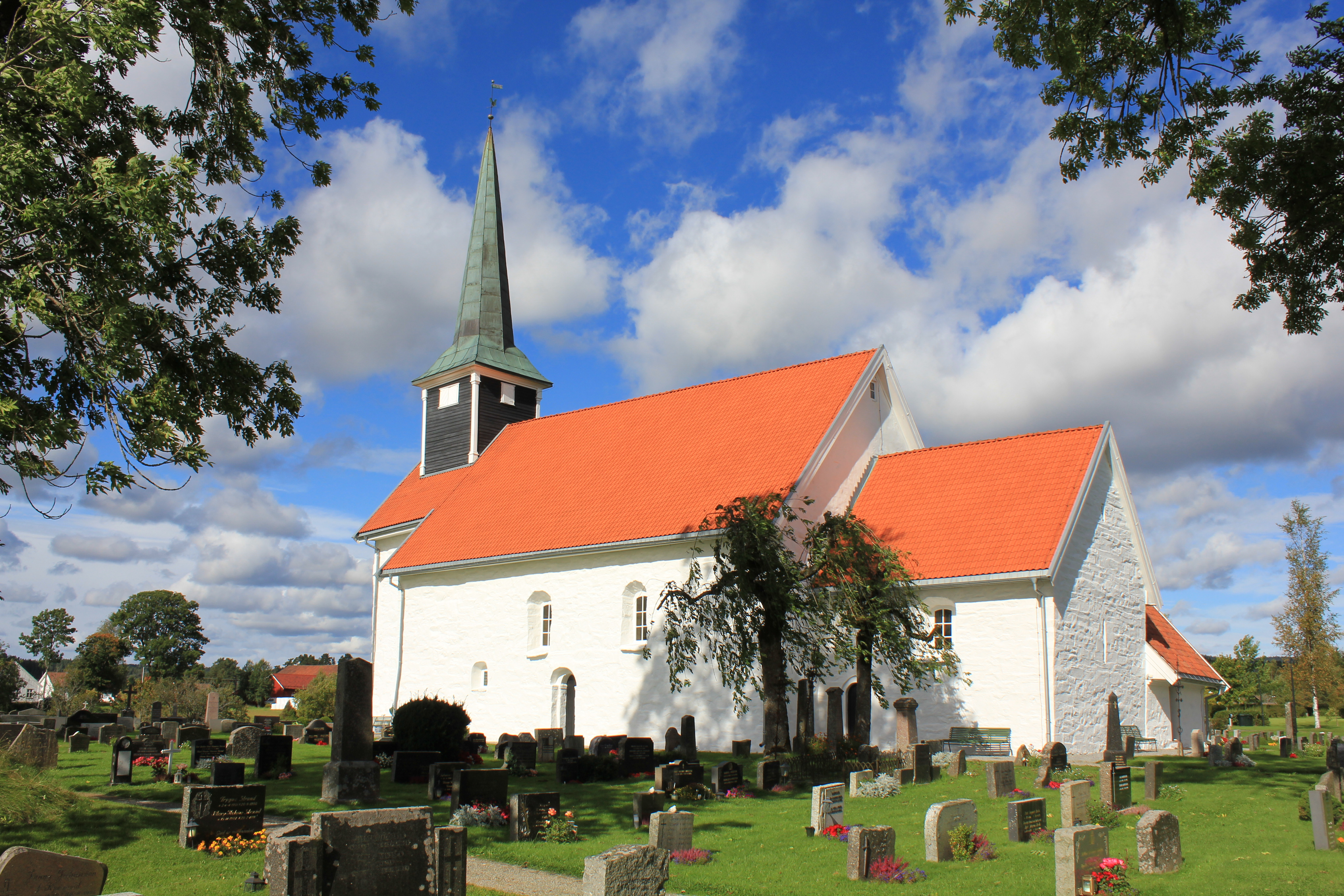

- Location of the church Enebakk Church (Norway)
- Location: Kirkebygda
- Country: Norway
- Denomination: Church of Norway
- Churchmanship: Evangelical Lutheran

History
- Status: Parish church

Architecture
- Functional status: Active
- Completed: 1104

Specifications
- Capacity: 320
- Materials: Stone

Administration
- Deanery: Nordre Follo

Enebakk Church (Norwegian: Enebakk kirke) is a rectangular church dating from the 1100s or 1200s in the municipality of Enebakk in Akershus county, Norway. Construction of today's church started around 1100 and since then it has undergone both expansions and major restorations, most recently in 2010.

The church is built of stone and can accommodate 320 people. The church can be reached via a popular tourist route along Norwegian County Road 120.

== Ownership ==
The first church at Enebakk was built at the order of the king and the clergy, and was probably funded by gifts and income from royal and ecclesiastical taxes on commoners. Around 1125, Sigurd the Crusader introduced a tithe. Many farms in Enebakk paid this directly to the church. In 1152 the opportunity was introduced to will gifts to the church.

With the Reformation in 1536, the king took over all the church property and the churches themselves. When Frederick IV experienced financial difficulties after the Great Northern War (1700–1721), he started selling churches to procure cash. There were several different owners of Enebakk Church as a result:

- In 1723, the king sold the church to Matias Rosenberg for 705 riksdaler.
- In 1749, Rosenberg sold it to Nils Bechman for 2,300 riksdaler.
- In 1753, Bechman it sold to Lieutenant Colonel Michelet and chief forest officer Clemmet Hansen at the Østenbøl farm for 2,576 riksdaler.
- In 1756, Michelet sold his half for 1,636 riksdaler to Hansen, and he became the sole owner. The owners of the farm Østenbøl owned the church until 1880. They also owned Mari Church from 1764 onward.
- In 1880, the municipality of Enebakk bought both churches for NOK 14,000.

== History ==
The first church at Enebakk was built of wood on a plot south of the houses on the Krogsbøl farm. The church was built at the beginning of Norway's Christian era, possibly following the order of Olaf II.

=== Circa 1100 ===
The next church that was built stood out in the landscape because of its size. The church had already been a gathering center in the village for almost 80 years, and it is believed to have been very large for local circumstances. The walls were over two ells (1.3 m or 4 ft 3 in) thick, the nave was 30 ells (18.8 m or 62 ft) long and 20 ells (12.6 m or 41 ft) wide, and the walls 12 ells (7.5 m or 25 ft) high. The chancel is believed to have been be 9 ells (5.6 m or 18 ft) both ways and 9 ells high.

The church was built of stone, and the construction of the chancel and nave used 1,000 cubic meters (35,000 cu ft) of stone. Much of this stone was quarried from a hill 700 meters (2,300 ft) northwest of the church. Building with stone and mortar had been unknown in Norway until this time. This construction technique came to the country with Christianity, and only churches, monasteries, bishops' residences, and the king's residence were built in this way in the early years.

Limestone for binder had to be quarried, burned, and slaked for up to seven years. It was of good quality; it solidified slowly, but became hard as stone. The foundation was dug 1.5 meters (4 ft 11 in) deep into the hill and was 1.5 times as wide as the wall above ground level. The outer stones were large and even, and pebbles and mortar were laid in the middle of the wall.

The north wall is slightly curved. Limestone was used for the corners and around the portal because it was easier to shape into plain surfaces and patterns. This stone probably came from the Oslo area. Construction work could only take place in the summer, and is believed to have involved three or four masonry teams with five or six men on each team. Considering the scope of the project, there were probably 35 men and two or three horses working at the site every day.

The church had an earthen floor. There may have been no other furnishings than the altar and the baptismal font. The limestone altarpiece stood on a walled plinth of gray stone against the east wall of the chancel. The baptismal font made of soapstone stood furthest west in the nave, probably to the right of the front door when entering the church. In various places on the walls, sun crosses were painted, which were a fertility symbol.

==== Dedication ====
Enebakk Church was dedicated to Saint Botwulf on Saint Gregory's Day, March 12. The event was mentioned in Bishop Eystein's Land Book from 1393, where the church was referred to as Ignebakka kirkia. In 1104 it was 500 years since Pope Gregory had died. Such a major celebration took place that year that it is reasonable to assume that this was the year the church was dedicated, and that the ceremony took place on March 12, 1104.

=== Circa 1200 ===
The church's tower was built around 1200. It was probably built higher than the ridge of the nave, and it was covered by a four-sided sloping roof.

The vestibule at the base of the tower in front of the entrance is called the våpenhuset, or the place to store weapons. Any weapons were placed here before entering the church. Next to the entrance door in the base of the tower there is a small hole in the wall on the left side. This is Norway's oldest "mailbox." Messages (and later bidding sticks) from the king and bishop were placed here by a messenger. Later, the letters were read by the priest from the pulpit or from the church hill after the worship service.

In the south wall of the vestibule a small square niche is cut into the wall. An altar stood here during the Catholic era, and the public had access to it when there was no service in the church. Catholic churches commonly have several small alters, as was also the case at Enebakk during the Catholic era.

=== Outlaws ===
The door on the east side of the nave has wrought-iron fittings in a Gothic design, perhaps from the same time as the tower was built. In the middle there is a ring. It has the form of two dragons biting the handle and their tails are braided together. If anyone that was outlawed fled to the church and held this ring, nobody could harm him.

=== Weights and measures ===
There is an iron rod hanging in the porch. It is an ell (alen), 63.2 centimeters (24.9 in) long. Earlier, a standard weight also hung here, but it is now gone. The standards served as references where the measuring units could be checked.

=== Circa 1500 ===
Around 1500, the church was in poor condition: the upper part of the tower and the east gable had collapsed. The walls were cracking and the ceiling was deteriorating. The period after the Black Death (1349–1350) was marked by a decline. Only a third of the population survived the epidemic, and there were few funds to maintain the church. A request for assistance was sent to highest authorities. The church even sold letters of indulgence to raise money until they were banned as a result of the Reformation in 1536.

Eventually funds were obtained and extensive repairs were carried out, and the building largely acquired the appearance it has today. The east gable above the nave was restored with red brick, and the cracks in the walls were repaired. A new roof was laid over the entire church. The entire roof was covered with wooden shakes, then spread with tar. Each shake was about 50 centimeters (20 in) long and 10 centimeters (3.9 in) wide, and the edge at one end sloped down. The shakes were fastened with wooden pegs, and there were about 40,000 shakes altogether, all of which had been split with an ax.

=== Vestry ===
A vestry was built on the north side of the chancel. It has the same length as the chancel, but is a little narrower. Originally there were two windows in the vestry, one to the north and one to the east. Later the east window was made larger and a door was installed. Because the vestry was used to store valuables, the door was made of small plates of iron equipped with a strong lock. The iron was smelted from bog iron.

=== Lead roof ===
The church was given lead roofing before 1600. The lead sheets were cast in wooden molds lined with sand. The lead sheets were large (about 250 cm × 47 cm or 98 in × 19 in) and heavy (120 kg or 260 lb), and they were prone to sagging and causing leaks. In 1787, the roof was replaced with blue glazed Dutch tile.

=== New tower ===
The top of the tower was not re-walled again. Instead, the roof over the nave was extended and passed over the tower at the same height. A square bell tower was built over the roof, and above it was a tall tower. The beams of the tower are dated to 1551. It is the oldest wooden tower on a stone church in Norway. It is possible that at that time the tower more or less received the shape it has today, but the belfry had four small corner towers.

Since then, the tower has undergone several major repairs, and the four corner towers were removed. The walls also had to be repaired, including the installation of large iron anchors that can still be seen in the west wall of the tower.

=== Spire ===
The top of the tower is decorated with a ball and a spire with a rooster and an iron flag with the year 1885. In Norse mythology, the rooster represented salvation from the powers of darkness when it announced dawn and sunrise. It was also thought that the rooster was protection against lightning strikes. In the Christian context, there is a rooster that "awakened" Apostle Peter. The ball symbolizes the globe. The height from the ground to top of the spire is 32 meters (105 ft), about the same as the total length of the church. In 1884 the tower was paneled and painted black, and in 1890 it was painted white. During the restoration of 1966, the tower was painted black with white corner posts and white windows.

=== 1966 restoration ===
The last major restoration of the church took place in 1966, after the floors were taken up in 1965. The earthen floor is about 70 centimeters (28 in) below the current wooden floor. A recess for a tomb was found in the middle of the nave. Some coins were also found, some remains of the lead roof, and some loose stones. During the 1966 restoration, several church frescoes (kalkmalerier) were also revealed. These are visible in the church over the gallery, on the northeast wall, and on the chancel arch. The stoves and chimneys were removed, and electrical heating with heating pipes was installed under each pew. New electric lights were also installed throughout the church.

== Furnishings ==
=== Bells ===
In the bell tower there are now three bells, a large one in the middle and a smaller one on each side. The largest bell is from the Middle Ages marked with a sun cross. It was probably acquired when the tower was built. The southern bell dates from 1682 and it bears a crucifix, Christian V's monogram, and inscriptions. One of the inscriptions reads "Alene Gud æren. Til Guds ære meg støpte Fridrich Meyer." (Glory to God alone. Fridrich Meyer cast me for the glory of God.)

On March 17, 1716, a Swedish detachment of Charles XII's soldiers took the large bell. However, Norwegian dragoons apprehended them and reinstalled the bell. The third bell was purchased by the municipality at an auction in Vestby, possibly in 1836, where it had been a farm bell. It would be used for funerals of the poor, paupers quartered at farms by the parish, and small farmers, without payment. During restoration work in 1966, the tin plates on the tower were removed and replaced with copper plates. The belfry was again painted black with white corner posts and white windows.

=== Altar ===
The altar during the earliest stage of the church was a large altar stone with a sepulchrum in the middle. In the sepulchrum there was a relic of St. Botwulf until the end of the Catholic era. When the altar was in use, the sepulchrum was covered with a square piece of stone and the edge was sealed with lead.

This stone altar was replaced with a wooden table in 1608. The altar stone was used in 1708 as a stone over a grave inside the church, bearing the year 1708 and a coat of arms, with the inscription ...dater. This was presumably the grave of Johanne Mathiesdatter Skulberg (1620–1708, married name Johanne Holmsen Buer), who was buried in the church; she was the widow of the bailiff (lensmann) Hans Holmsen Buer (1617–1697). When the grave was removed, the slab was taken to the Østenbøl farm, where the owners of the church lived. It was laid in front of the kitchen staircase as a flagstone threshold. At that time or later, it broke into two parts, and the smaller part was placed in the foundation of the barn ramp. Later the second part also ended up there. During restoration work in 1966, the pieces were collected and reassembled in the church's porch.

The panels of the wooden altar, installed in 1608, had three successive layers of various decorations. The last two layers were removed during restoration in 1966 so that the oldest decoration appeared. Only the lower square part of the wooden altar dates from 1608. This includes a catechism panel with the Lord's Prayer, the Words of Institution, and the Ten Commandments. They are written in blackletter.

In 1667 the altar was built larger and received more decoration. Christopher Ridder executed the woodcarving, and the portraitist Jørgen Schult painted it. On a black background just above the middle is a five-line inscription stating that Christen Eskildsen paid for the decoration in honor of his second wife, Sofie Christensdatter Bing. Christen Eskildsen was a well-established merchant in Christiania. He owned the Flateby farm and founded the Flateby estate by buying up many of the surrounding farms. The initials of the parish priest Jens Andersen and his wife Anna Hansdatter Kraft are written on small fields, as well as the initials and coat of arms of Ulrik Fredrik Gyldenløve, and King Frederik III's monogram and royal motto Dominus providebit (The Lord will provide). Below this is a depiction of the crucifixion, flanked by Mary and John.

The decorated panel was removed from the church around 1730 and placed in the attic, perhaps because of its lush angelic figures (under the influence of Pietism). The panel remained in the ceiling until the 1870s. It was then moved to the Østenbøl farm and placed in the loft in the barn. On June 28, 1906, Asbjørn Oppegaard purchased the panel at auction for NOK 100 and gave it back to the church. That year, the Enebakk savings bank also donated NOK 400 to restore the panel, and the outlay for its purchase was also refunded by the bank. In 1907, the Municipality of Enebakk allocated NOK 500 for the painter Carl Lunde to restore the altar, bringing the total expenditure for restoration to NOK 900.

The altar table has two brass candlesticks from 1661 that were given to the church by Johan Hagemeister and Kristin Anderdatter Karre.

=== Pulpit ===
The pulpit's sounding board dates from 1578 and is the oldest in Norway. It has an inscription from John 3.16: Saa hafver Gud elskt verden at hand gaf der haen sin enbaarn søn paa det ath alle som troe paa hannem skulle icke blifve fortabt men hafve det evige lif 1578 (For God so loved the world, that he gave his only begotten Son, that whosoever believeth in him should not perish, but have everlasting life. 1578). This sounding board probably originally hung over the baptismal font. However, when the baptismal font was removed from the church in 1703, the fixture was out of place. The owner of the church hung it over his own chair. When the municipality assumed ownership of the church in 1880, the fixture was placed in the attic; it was taken down again and installed over the pulpit in 1907.

The pulpit in its present form dates from 1667. The churchwarden and bailiff Abraham Bøhler ordered the new pulpit and arranged for it and the altar table to be painted. However, he did not obtain the approval of the parish priest, Laurits Christophersen Thue. Therefore, the parish priest filed a case against Bøhler to have the church's money refunded, but without success. The ornaments were carved by Christopher Ridder, and the decoration was painted by Jørgen Schult. The main panel on the pulpit shows Christ in a red robe as the savior of the world, with a globe in His hand. The panel to the left shows John the Baptist with a banner. The panel furthest to the right shows an angel holding the Veil of Veronica. The motif originated in the legend of Saint Veronica, who dried the sweat of Jesus' brow at the crucifixion with her veil, and the image of His face was miraculously impressed upon it. Below the image to the right is written C.Anset (possibly 'the face of Christ').

=== Baptismal font ===
The baptismal font is the oldest and only part of the original inventory that is still in use. It is carved from a single block of soapstone. The vessel is approximately 70 centimeters (28 in) in diameter, and its volume is approximately 90 liters (20 imp gal; 24 U.S. gal). The color of the stone indicates that it came from the Marker or Aremark area. At the bottom of the vessel there is a hole that could be closed with a stopper so that the baptismal water could be released onto the former earthen floor after the ceremony (water that was blessed could not be discarded outside the church).

Today a brass basin is used for baptisms. The church acquired a small basin in 1691, and a larger one in 1748. Both probably date from the 16th century. The small one was stolen from the church in 1999. The large one is as decorated with a central scene showing the fall of man surrounded by bands with deer. The baptismal canopy dates from 1713. It was carved by Nicolai Borg. Around the edge there are four angels, and below is a copy of the dove hanging under the pulpit's sounding board because it was previously used as the baptismal canopy.

=== Pews ===
The pews in Enebakk Church were installed in 1634, and they are the oldest church pews that are in regular use in Norway. Before that it is believed that there were only stools along the walls for those that needed them most. The pews have finely carved end boards. Near the top there is a black field where the names of the farms in Enebakk are written. Each farm name was written on two pews, one on the north side of the church and one on the south side. The north side (on the left when entering the church) was the female side, and the south side was the male side. A total of 126 different farm names are written on the end boards along the aisle, probably for all of the inhabited farms that belonged to the parish.

The original "pews" in the church were simply stringers with a backrest. At the top there was a rail, and the parishioners stood and rested their elbows against the rail. Later a narrow seat was added, but then the rail got in the way of the back, and so it was removed and used to make the seats wider. The narrow rail at the back of the seat is profiled on the underside. On the front pew on the north side is written Den Hellige Daab Samt Inden For Hr Sogneprestens Families Stoel (Holy baptism and the seat for the parish priest's family), and on the back pew on the north side is written N^{o} 16 Gamle Og Schrøbelige Huuſ-mens Qvinder (No. 16, Old and feeble tenant women).

=== Organ ===
The church has had several organs. One bishop mentioned after a visitation on August 29, 1812: "The singing in the church was excellent, which was contributed to the newly installed organ or positive, donated to the church by War Commissar [Jonathan Julius] Aars, and the installation paid for by Pastor Aars, and outfitted with one stop." In 1877, the church received a new mechanical organ with six stops. This was built by the German company E. F. Walker & Cie in Ludwigsburg. That organ was removed in 1975 and replaced with a new one. The 1975 organ was Norway's first organ with classical stops in the tradition of the 18th-century Baroque. It is completely pure-tuned in F major. The organ has 16 stops divided into two manuals and pedals. It is composed of 1,072 individual organ pipes, of which 42 are wooden pipes. The organ is well suited for concerts, and especially for compositions by the old masters. The new organ was consecrated on December 14, 1975. It was built by the company Gebrüder Jehmlich Orgelbau in Dresden. The total cost of the organ was NOK 224,000.

=== The Enebakk Madonna ===
Next to the south door of the church there is a plaster cast of the Enebakk Madonna; the original is now in the antiquities collection at the Museum of Cultural History. The statue and the crucifix over the chancel arch probably originally came from Tenor Church in Slitu in Eidsberg. This is stated by the parish priest Jacob Nicolai Wilse in a book from 1791. Tenor Church was closed before the Reformation in 1536 and deteriorated. Any decoration that was left was taken to the nearby farm; during the Reformation, the decoration was removed from all of the churches. Ingeborg Olsdatter Eidsberg (1595–1661) may have brought the crucifix and Madonna when she moved to Enebakk in 1616. The descendants of Holm Hansen Ekeberg (1585–1645) and Ingeborg Olsdatter Eidsberg at the Østenbøl farm later became the owners of Enebakk Church. When the altar was taken down and placed in the attic around 1750, it is possible that the crucifix was given to the church and hung on the wall above the altar and that the Madonna came with it at the same time.

The crucifix and the Madonna are some of the most ancient medieval art in Norway. They are believed to have been created around 1240. The Madonna has a smiling face reminiscent of Leonardo da Vinci's Mona Lisa. The statue was apparently sent to the antiquities collection at the Museum of Cultural History for repair in the late 19th century, after which nobody asked for it to be returned and the museum thus retained the statue. The museum has insured the Madonna stature for NOK 6 million.

=== Frescoes ===
The church's old financial accounts mention frescoes (kalkmalerier), but they were covered by whitewash around 1600. During the 1966 restoration, investigations were carried out and remains of decorations were found under the layers of whitewash.

The oldest frescoes were found on the east wall in the chancel behind the altar. There are the remains of a layer of wax with traces of colors. This indicates that the chancel was partially decorated in the Middle Ages. Over the course of time, the walls were whitewashed approximately 30 times and colors were found around layer no. 15. Below the decorations there are also about 15 layers of whitewash. This made the effort to reveal the decorations very difficult and time consuming.

The oldest fresco is a scene on the chancel arch. This humorous image depicts a woman churning butter. She is wearing a dress with a ruff collar and a beret on her head, clothing that was usual around 1540. Around her stand three fanciful devils that are helping her. This illustrates an old superstition that it was possible to summon devils to make butter faster. Similar images are also found in Danish and Finnish church frescoes. When this fresco was painted it was the height of the witch trials, which may have contributed to the context. It was believed that witches received help from the devil to retrieve cream from their neighbors so they were never without butter. One devil has a bucket on his tail.

Above the fresco is the inscription Superbia 'pride'. In the Catholic Church, 'pride' was the most serious of the seven deadly sins. On the other side of the chancel it is likely that the virture Humilitas 'humility' was depicted. Here, however, the plaster fell from the wall and was later repaired. Other frescoes in the church depict vines, scenes from biblical stories, and people.

During the restoration in 1966, remnants of a painted lozenge patterns were found in the sacristy. The entire room has been repainted with this design. The same decoration is found at Nyborg Castle in Denmark. The painted cruciform flowers, which are found in the decoration in all three rooms in the church, were widely used in sculpture, painting, and artwork in the Middle Ages.

== Election church ==
Enebakk Church served as an election church (Norwegian: valgkirke) in 1814. Together with about 300 churches across Norway, it was a venue for elections to the 1814 Norwegian Constituent Assembly. These were Norway's first national elections.

== Millennium site ==
In connection with the turn of the millennium, the church was chosen as the municipality of Enebakk's millennium site.

== 1974 burglary ==
The church was broken into and items were stolen in 1974. The items lost included a pyx from 1710, a chalice and paten, 24 communion cups, two small candlesticks, and two small jars, all of silver.
