= Enebakk =

Enebakk Municipality Enebakk kommune
- Municipality
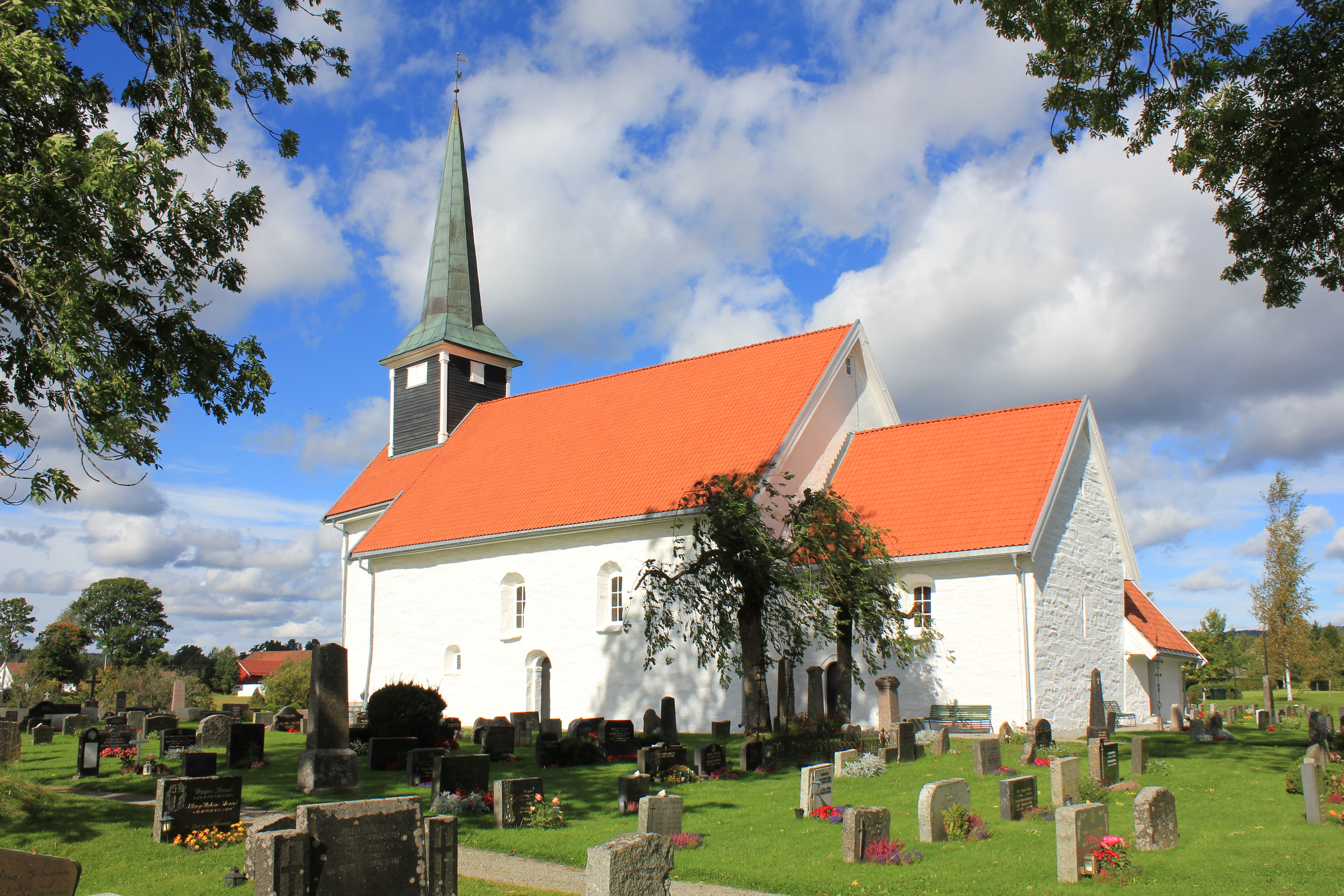

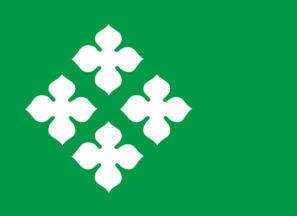
- Flag Coat of arms

- Akershus within Norway

- Enebakk within Akershus
- Coordinates: 59°46′27″N 11°6′7″E
- Country: Norway
- County: Akershus
- District: Follo
- Administrative centre: Kirkebygda

Government
  - Mayor (2015): Øystein Slette (Labour)

Area
  - Total: 233 km^{2} (90 sq mi)
  - Land: 195 km^{2} (75 sq mi)
  - Rank: #312 in Norway

Population (2004)
  - Total: 9,233
  - Rank: #111 in Norway
  - Density: 47/km^{2} (120/sq mi)
  - Change (10 years): ▲ +14.5%
- Demonym: Enebakking

Official language
  - Norwegian form: Bokmål
- Time zone: UTC+01:00 (CET)
  - Summer (DST): UTC+02:00 (CEST)
- ISO 3166 code: NO-3220
- Website: Official website

Enebakk is a municipality in Akershus county, Norway. It is part of the Follo traditional region. The administrative centre of the municipality is the village of Kirkebygda. The parish of Enebak was established as a municipality on 1 January 1838 (see formannskapsdistrikt). The part of Enebakk lying east of lake Øyeren was transferred to Fet municipality in 1962.

== General information ==
=== Name ===
The municipality (originally the parish) is named after the old Enebakk farm (Old Norse: Ignarbakki), since the first church was built here. The first element is the genitive case of a river name Ign (the meaning is unknown) and the last element is bakki which means "river bank". In Norse times the parish was alternatively called Ignardalr meaning "the valley of (the river) Ign". Prior to 1921, the name was written "Enebak".

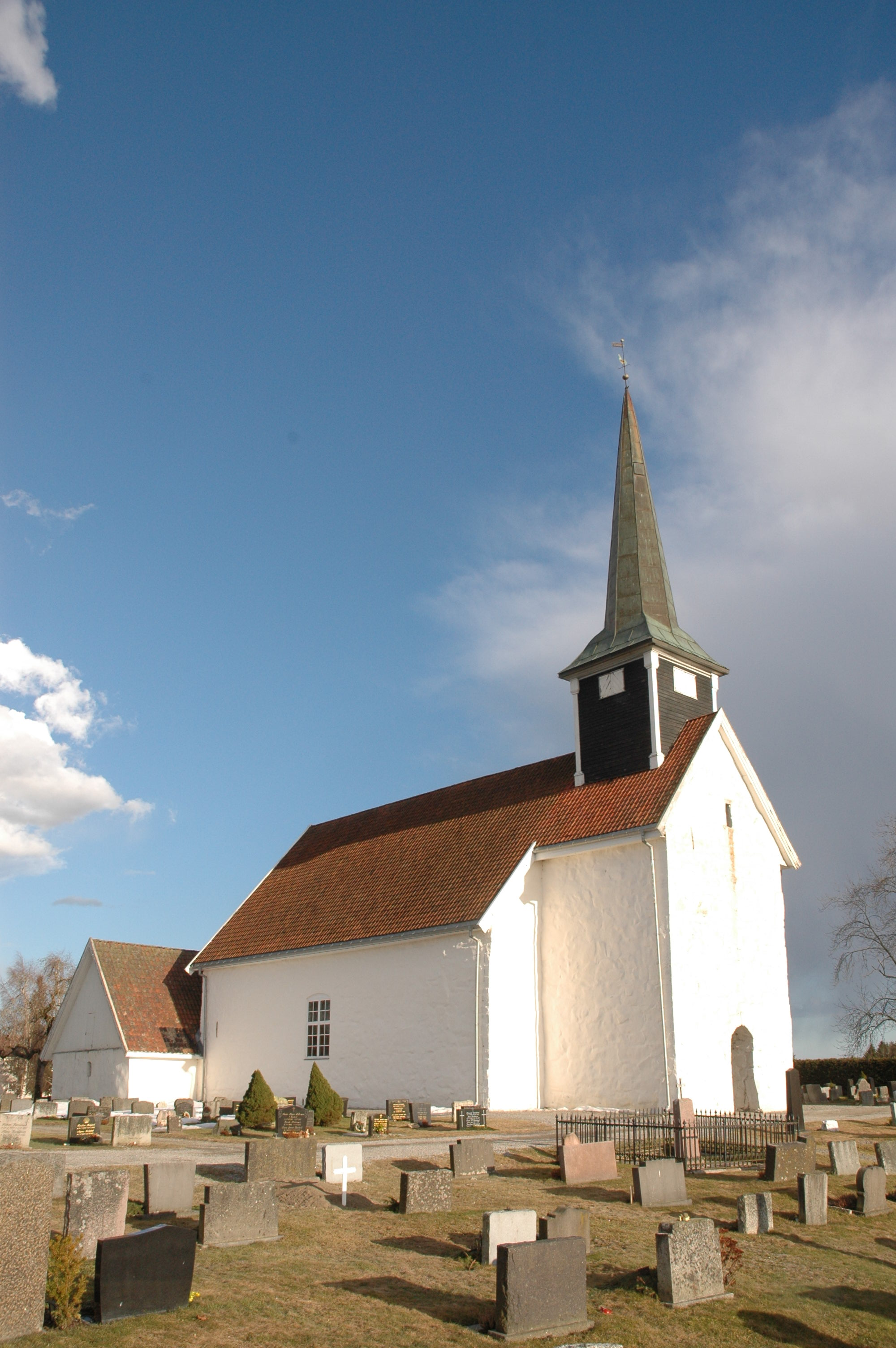
Enebakk church

== Enebakk Church ==
Enebakk Church (Enebakk kirke) dated from 11th-12th century. It is constructed in a rectangular shape. The edifice is of stone and has 280 seats. The present church has since been expanded and undergone major restorations, the latest in 2010. Enebakk church is a medieval era church, with a rectangular nave and finished choir. Portals and corners are quarried sandstone, while the church was constructed by the macadam. The nave and chancel were built in the 1100s, while the west tower was built during the 1200s. The tower was originally higher than now, but was rebuilt around 1520. The ridge turret of the tower roof was built in 1622, and is thus the oldest preserved wooden tower in the country.

The frescoes in the nave were uncovered in the 1960s. They were originally painted in the late 1500s and covered all the walls, but were later painted over after the Reformation. The decoration is done in Renaissance style. In 1608 the church received a new altar with catechism boards, which are an altarpiece without pictures, just text. The altarpiece was later elevated to a picture field showing the Crucifixion. This was done in the 1660s. The baptismal font from the 1100s is of soapstone with Romanesque decoration. The church has two wooden sculptures: a crucifix hanging above the chancel arch and a Madonna both in Gothic style.

=== Coat-of-arms ===
The coat-of-arms is from modern times. They were granted on 12 December 1986. The arms are based on a drawing in the local church that dates back to the early 17th century. They show four silver crosses on a green background. It is inspired by old mural paintings in the Enebakk church from the Middle Ages. It shows four fourblades. The number four symbolizes the four parts of the municipality (see below).

Number of minorities (1st and 2nd generation) in Enebakk by country of origin in 2017
Ancestry	Number
Poland	397
Pakistan	114
Lithuania	101
Sweden	98
Germany	58
Philippines	54
Iran	51
Russia	48

== Media ==
The newspaper Enebakk Avis is published in Enebakk.

== Geography ==
Enebakk is divided into four areas, named Flateby (Postcode 1911), Kirkebygda (Postcode 1912), and Ytre Enebakk (Postcode 1914), being closest to Oslo.

The highest point in Enebakk is Vardåsen, situated between the lakes Børtervann and Øyeren, at 374 metres (1,227 ft) above sea level.

Enebakk is a mere 30 kilometres (18.6 mi) from the city limits of Oslo, with easy bus-access to the country's capital. As of 2004, there are no train stations in the municipality.

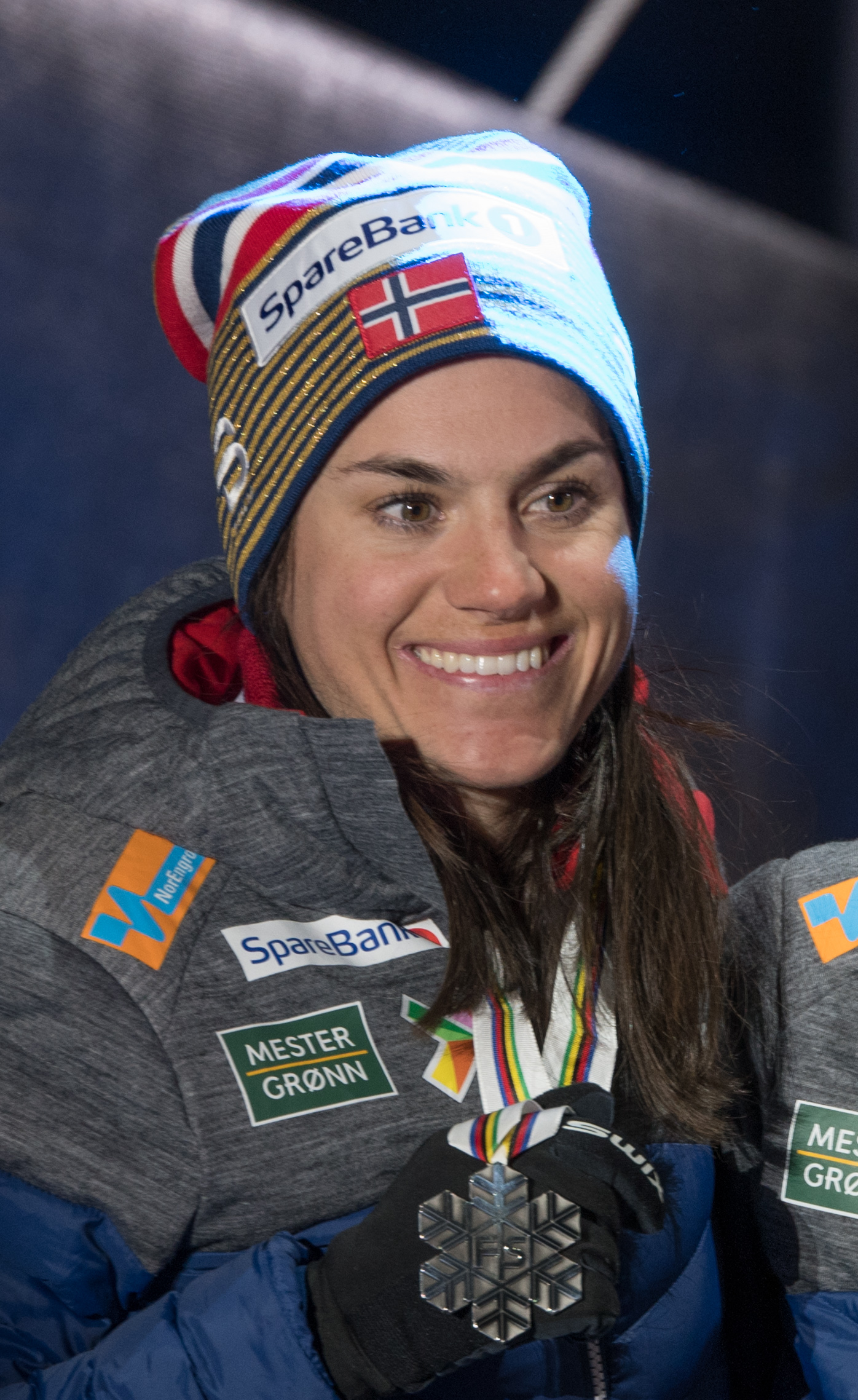
Heidi Weng, 2019

== Notable people ==
- Thomas Alsgaard (1972 in Enebakk) a Norwegian cross-country skier
- Thorleif Andresen (born 1945 in Enebakk) cyclist, competed at the 1968, 1972 and the 1976 Summer Olympics
- Einar Holstad (born 1950) a politician, mayor of Enebakk 1994–1995
- Ragnhild Jølsen (1875 on Ekeberg farm – 1908) a Norwegian author about the conflict between old rural society and modern industrial society
- Hans Thoresen (1767 at Degrum - 1840) a Norwegian timber merchant and ship-owner
- Heidi Weng (born 1991 in Ytre Enebakk) a Norwegian cross-country skier and fell runner

== Sister cities ==
The following cities are twinned with Enebakk:

- - Hammarö, Värmland County, Sweden
