= New Fetsund Bridge =

Road bridge in Lillestrøm, Norway

Coordinates: 59°55′26″N 11°09′47″E

The New Fetsund Bridge (Norwegian: Fetsund nye bru) is a road bridge on Norwegian National Road 22 that crosses the Glomma River at Fetsund in the municipality of Lillestrøm in Akershus county, Norway. It is 595 meters (1,952 ft) long, and its longest span measures 90 meters (300 ft).

Construction on the new road bridge began in 1954, and it was opened by King Olav V on December 12, 1959. The bridge stands a few hundred meters downstream from the Fetsund Bridge, which was previously a combined road and rail bridge. There was long a need for the new bridge because the old bridge was built for an axle load of barely three tons.

The Norwegian Public Roads Administration carried out a feasibility study for building a new road bridge in Fetsund in 2012.
