= Einar Holstad =

Norwegian politician (born 1950)

Einar Holstad (born 8 August 1950 in Oslo) is a Norwegian politician for the Christian Democratic Party.

He served as a representative to the Norwegian Parliament from Akershus during the terms 1997–2001 and 2001–2005. From 1997 to 2000, and during the entire second term, he met as a regular representative meanwhile Valgerd Svarstad Haugland was appointed to the first and second cabinet Bondevik.

Holstad was involved in local politics in Enebakk municipality from 1979 to 1983 and 1987 to 2003, serving as deputy mayor in 1991–1993 and mayor in 1994–1995. He has chaired the municipal party chapter for several periods.

He was one of the main initiators to revive the pro-Israel parliamentary caucus Friends of Israel in the Parliament of Norway in 2002, stating his view of Israel as "God's chosen people", and the nation being "God-willed".
