= Kirkebygda =

Village in Enebakk Municipality, Norway

Coordinates: 59°46′27″N 11°6′7″E

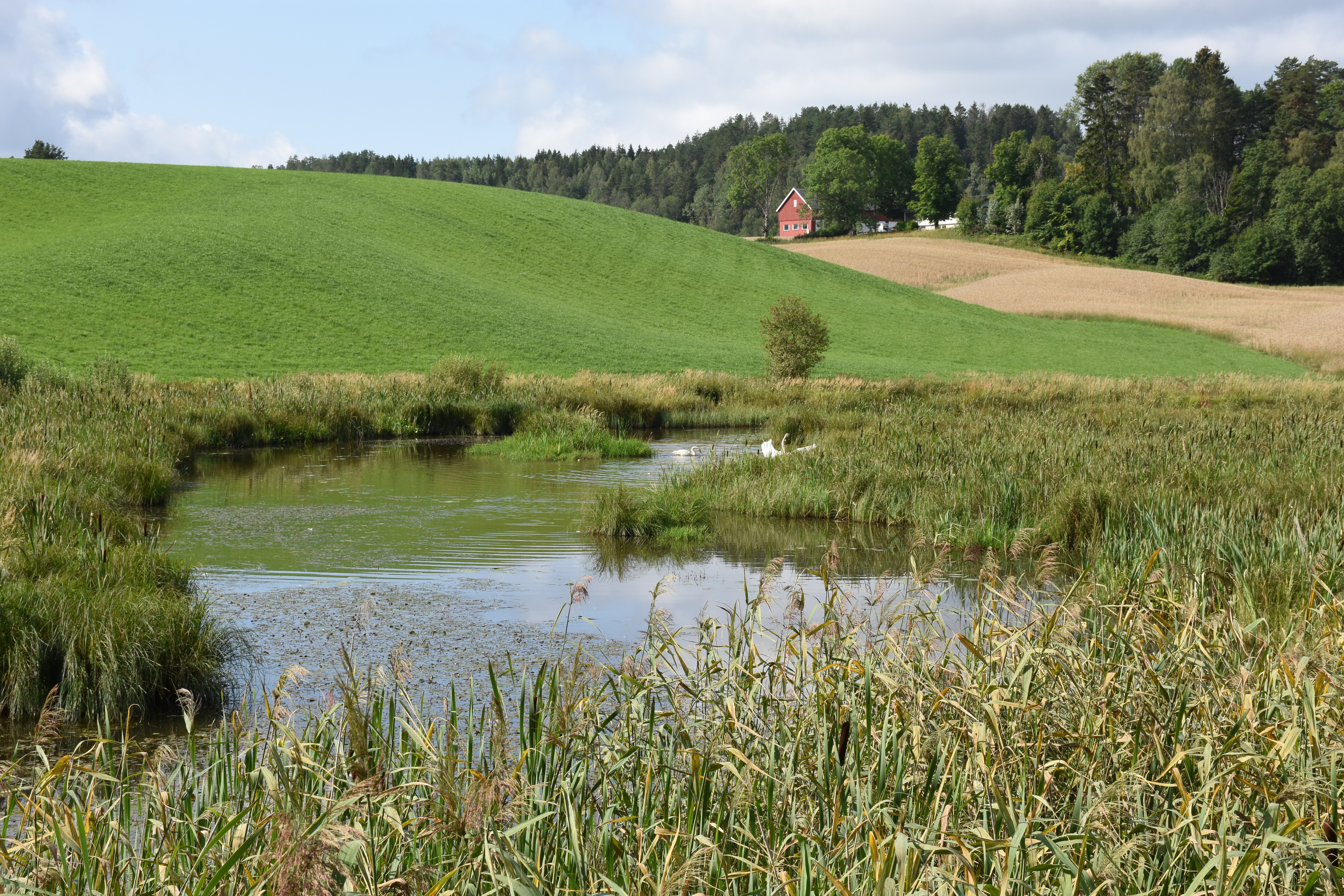

Kirkebygda is the administrative centre of Enebakk municipality, Norway. Its population was reported as 1,448.
