= Urskog–Høland Line =

Heritage railway in Sørum, Akershus, Norway

Norwegian: Urskog–Hølandsbanen
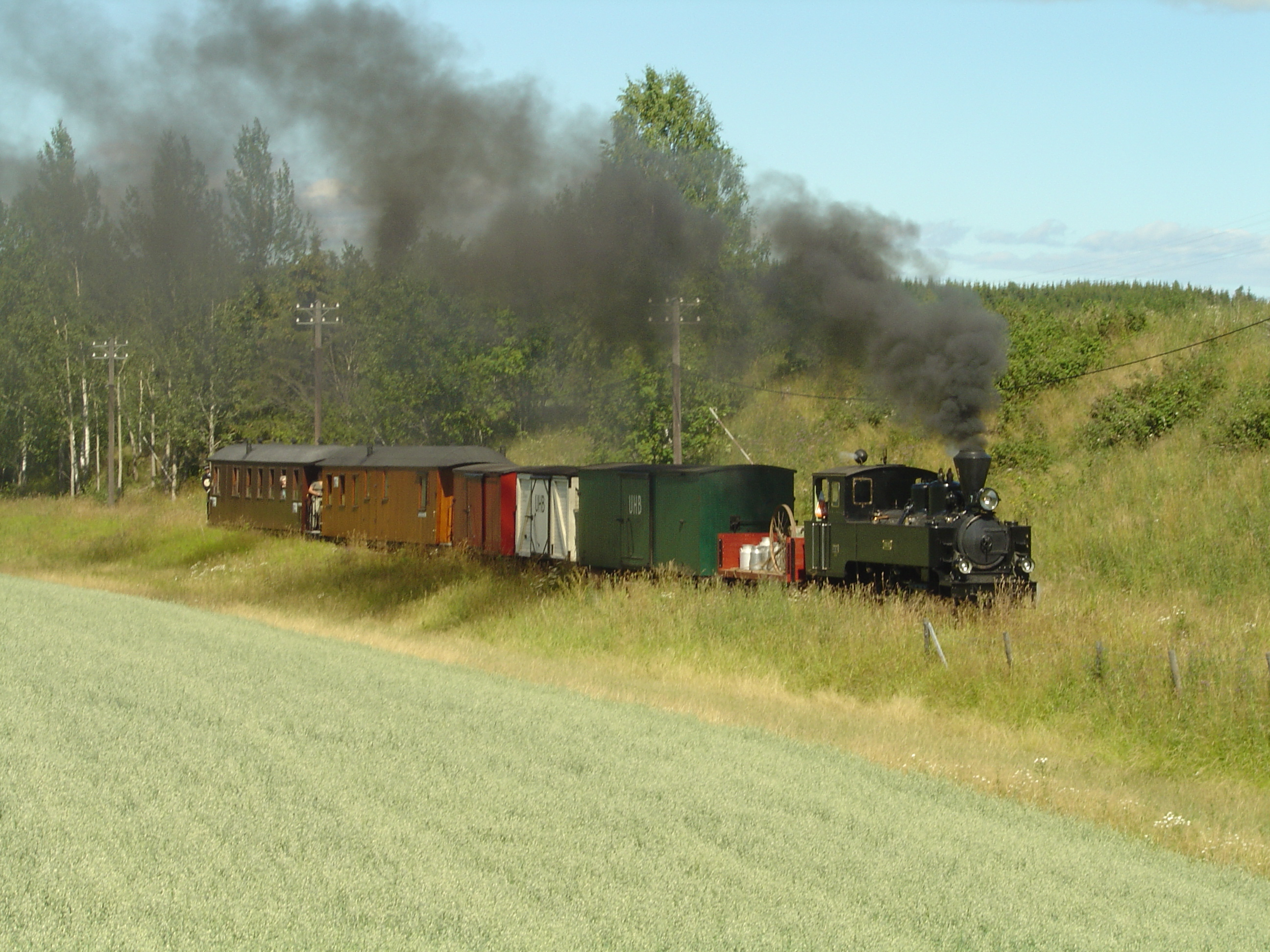
- Loco No. 7 Prydz with a mixed train on the Urskog–Hølandsbanen, 18 July 2006

Commercial operations
- Original gauge: 750 mm (2 ft 5 1/2 in)

Preserved operations
- Preserved gauge: 750 mm (2 ft 5 1/2 in)

Commercial history
- Opened: 1896
- Closed: 1960

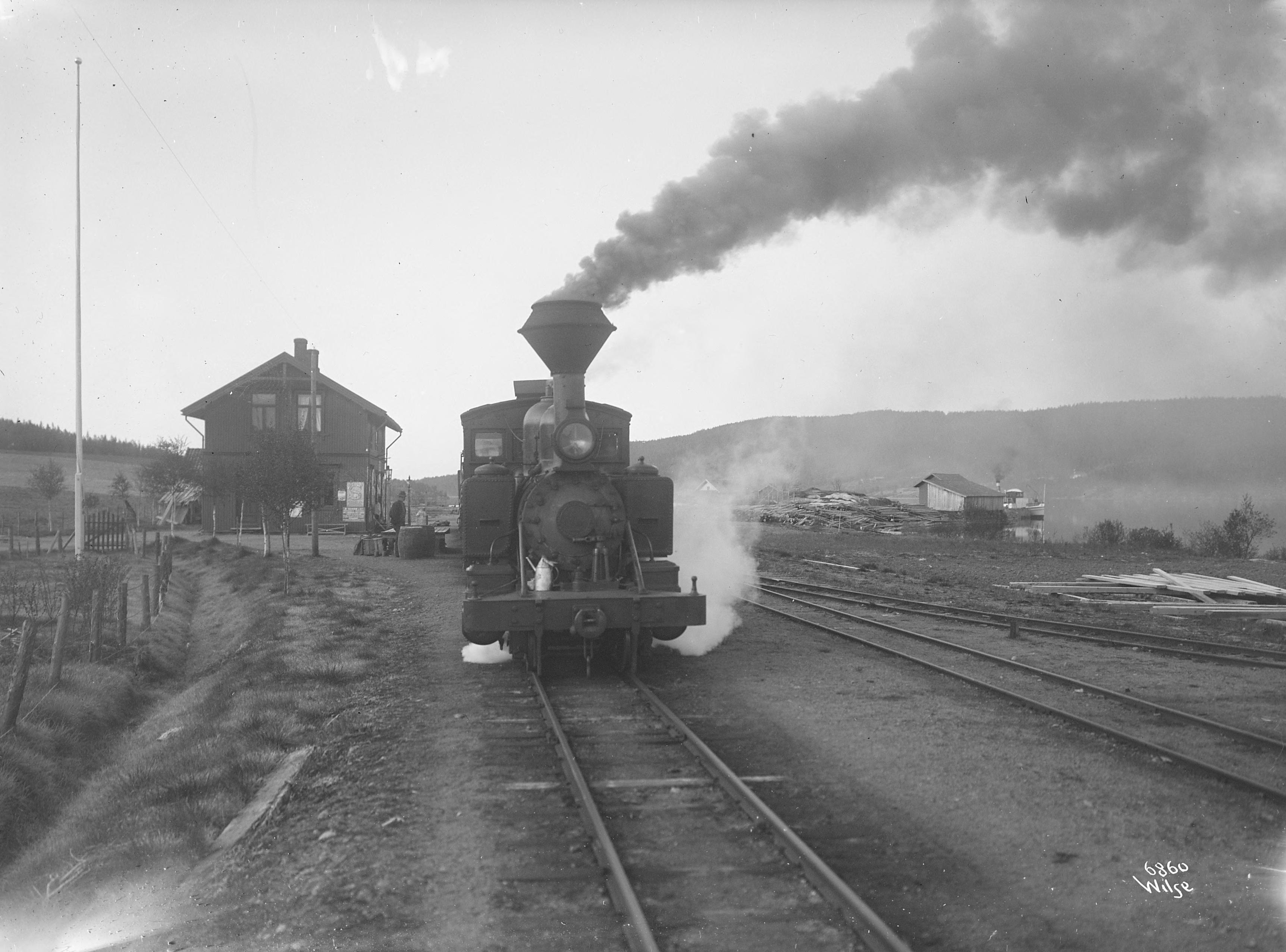
Skulerud Station on 27 May 1907

The Urskog–Høland Line (Norwegian: Urskog–Hølandsbanen), also known as Tertitten, is a narrow-gauge railway between Sørumsand and Skulerud in Norway.

== History ==
The original line was 57 kilometres (35 mi) long and was built in three stages: Urskogbanen opened in 1896, running from Bingsfossen to Bjørkelangen; Hølandsbanen from Bjørkelangen to Skulerud opened in 1898 and finally the line between Bingsfos and Sørumsand in 1903. Today part of the line is preserved as a museum at Sørumsand in Lillestrøm kommune. The railway company was headquartered at Bjørkelangen. The line was built in the least expensive way as a so-called tertiary railway with a 750 mm (2 ft 5 1/2 in) gauge track. This gave the line its diminutive, affectionate nickname, "Tertitten". The railway was run as a privately owned joint stock company until 1945 when it was bought by the government and run by the Norwegian State Railways (NSB) under the name Aurskog-Hølandbanen.

The basis for the railway lay mostly in forest and agriculture products. Lumber was transported to Skulerud and from there it was rafted to Halden. At one time a tour billed as "The Great Roundtrip" was a popular tourist attraction, combining the train ride with a boat ride on the steam ship "DS Turisten" which trafficked the Halden Canal.

=== The restoration ===
A cooperative consisting of volunteers was established in 1961 with the aim of securing the line for posterity. A 3-kilometer track at Sørumsand was given to the group along with two steam locomotives and some other stock. The first run as a heritage railway was undertaken in 1966. This stretch had no buildings or side tracks, and all facilities which meet the present-day visitor was built after becoming a heritage railway. Three of the steam locomotives and two passenger carriages were restored.

When the heritage railway was established the terminus was just outside the town center of Sørumsand, with the track leading to the station building already having been removed. In 1987 the line had been extended and the first train could depart from the town center again. After another two years the entire operation, including station building, was finished, and the extended track was officially inaugurated. The entire complex is protected by law. The Urskog–Høland Line is now a museum under the umbrella of Museene i Akershus (MiA) run i cooperation with "Venneforeningen Tertitten".

== Locomotives ==
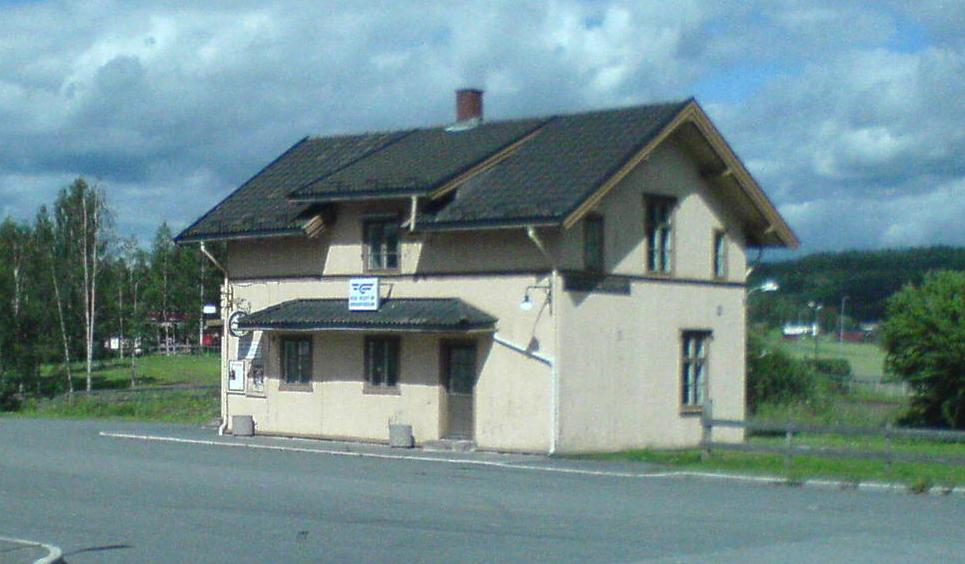
Bjørkelangen Station

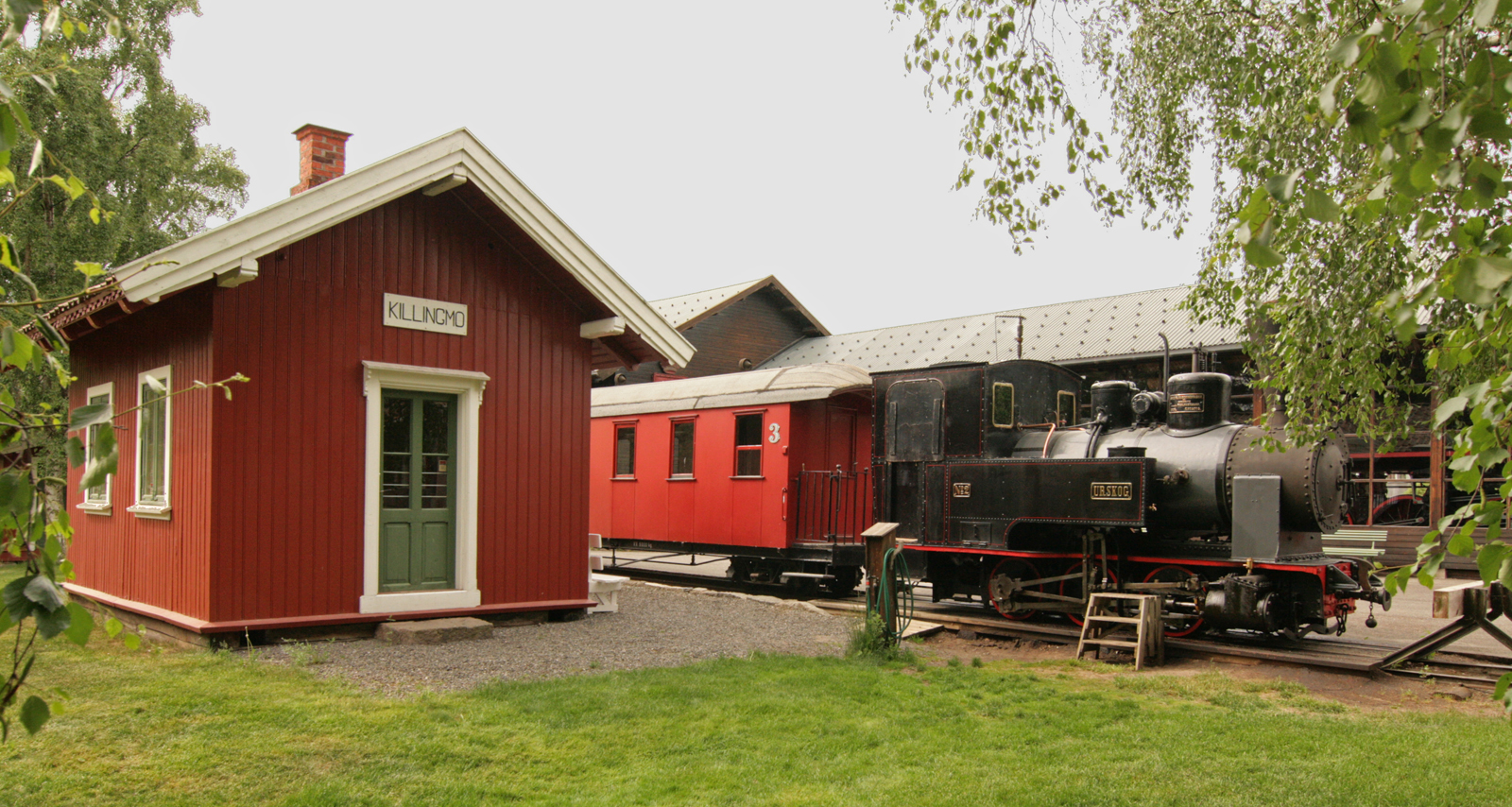
No.2 "Urskog" and Killingmo Station at the Norwegian Railway Museum

=== Steam ===
Number	Name	Axle config	Type	Built by	Remarks
4	Setskogen	2-6-2T	2 cyl. steam	Sächsische Maschinenfabrik (Hartmann) 3356 of 1909	NSB type XXVIII
6	Høland	2-6-2T	2 cyl. steam	Sächsische Maschinenfabrik (Hartmann) 4658 of 1925	NSB type XXIX
7	Prydz	2-6-2T	2 cyl. steam	Henschel 28463 of 1950	NSB type XXIX

=== Diesel ===
Number	Name	Axle config	Type	Built by	Remarks
12	Tinfos				
14	Bingsfos			UHB 1996	Derived from NSB shunter
Skd 220		B	Diesel-hydraulic	NSB	Normal gauge

== Rolling stock ==
=== Passenger ===
Number	Type	Built by	Axle config	Description
1	Co	Skabo 1896	2-2	3rd class carriage
2	BCo	Skabo 1896	2-2	2nd and 3rd class carriage
3	BCo	Skabo 1898	2-2	2nd and 3rd class carriage
5	CFo	Skabo 1898	2-2	Baggage and 3rd class carriage
10	BCo	Skabo 1913	2-2	2nd and 3rd class carriage
100	A 21	Skabo 1926	2-2	

=== Freight ===
Number	Type	Built by	Axle config	Description
1	To	Skabo 1895	2-2	Flatcar
9	G	Strømmen 1895	2	Goods van
13	G	Strømmen 1895	2	Goods van
19	K	Strømmen 1896	2	Gondola car
26	Go	Moss Jernstøberi og Mek. vst. 1898	2-2	Goods van
27	To	Moss Jernstøberi og Mek. vst. 1898	2-2	Flatcar

== See also ==
- Narrow-gauge railways in Norway
