= Fjellsrud =

- Village
- Location in Akershus
- Coordinates: 59°53′N 11°13′E
- Country: Norway
- Region: Østlandet
- County: Akershus
- Municipality: Lillestrøm

Area
  - Total: 0.53 km^{2} (0.20 sq mi)

Population (2025)
  - Total: 742
  - Density: 1,400/km^{2} (3,600/sq mi)
- Time zone: UTC+01:00 (CET)
  - Summer (DST): UTC+02:00 (CEST)

Fjellsrud is a village in the municipality of Lillestrøm, Norway. Its population as of 2025 is 742 and spans 0.53 km².
