= Øyeren =

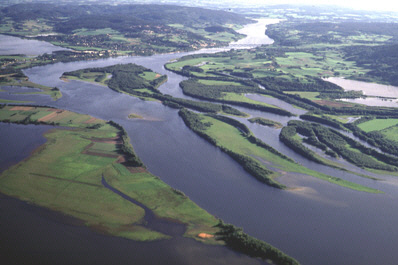

- Location within Akershus

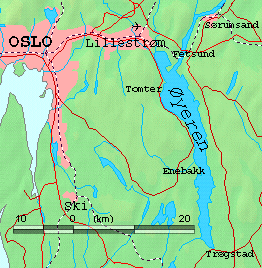
- Map of Øyeren and surrounds
- Location: Akershus and Østfold counties, Norway
- Coordinates: 59°51′26″N 11°09′48″E
- Type: natural lake
- Primary inflows: Glomma
- Primary outflows: Glomma
- Catchment area: 40,441.63 km^{2} (15,614.60 sq mi)
- Basin countries: Norway
- Surface area: 84.74 km^{2} (32.72 sq mi)
- Average depth: 14 m (46 ft)
- Max. depth: 76 m (249 ft)
- Water volume: 1.19 km^{3} (0.29 cu mi)
- Shore length^{1}: 165.47 km (102.82 mi)
- Surface elevation: 101 m (331 ft)
- References: NVE

Ramsar Wetland
- Official name: Nordre Oyeren
- Designated: 24 July 1985
- Reference no.: 307
- ^{1} Shore length is not a well-defined measure.

Øyeren is a lake in the Glomma River watershed, southeast of the city of Lillestrøm. It is located within the municipalities of Enebakk, Lillestrøm, and Rælingen in Akershus county and Indre Østfold municipality in Østfold county.

Lake Øyeren is the ninth largest lake by area in Norway with a surface area of 84.7 square kilometers (32.7 square miles). It is 101 meters (331 feet) above sea level and 76 meters (249 feet) deep.

== The name ==
The name of the lake (Norse Øyir) is derived from øy f 'island; flat and fertile land along a waterside'.

== Nordre Øyeren nature preserve ==
An area that includes parts of the northern ("nordre") end of the lake is an established nature preserve, listed as a Ramsar site.
