= Sørumsand =

- Village
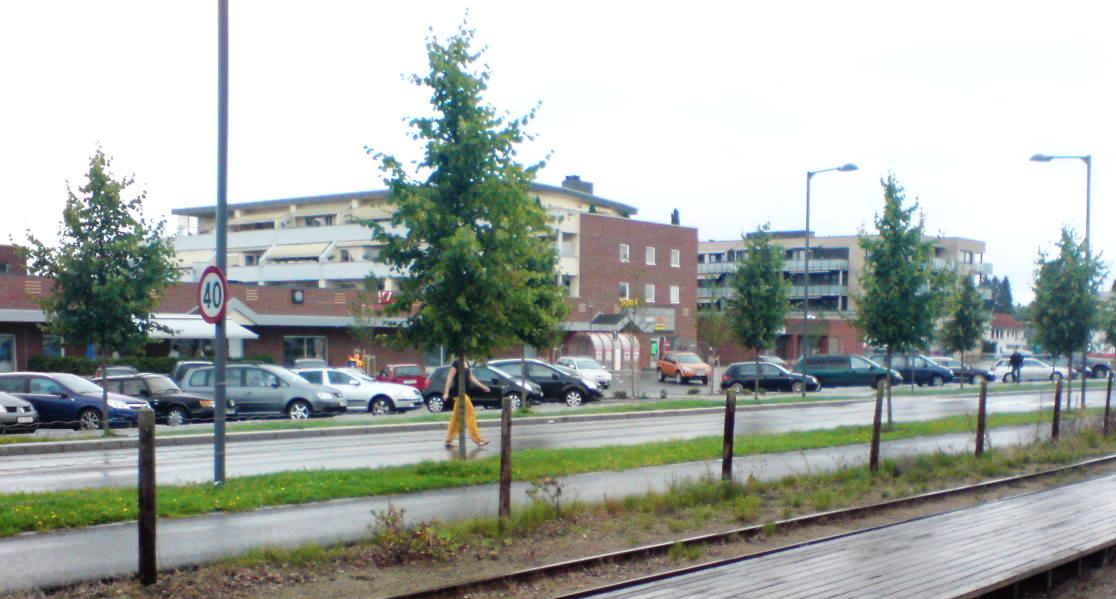
- Fokus Shopping center and Tertitten train track

- Location in Akershus
- Coordinates: 59°58′N 11°15′E
- Country: Norway
- Region: Østlandet
- County: Akershus
- Municipality: Lillestrøm

Population (2023)
  - Total: 5,878
- Time zone: UTC+01:00 (CET)
  - Summer (DST): UTC+02:00 (CEST)

Sørumsand is a small railway town, situated in Lillestrøm municipality in Akershus in Norway. Sørumsand was the terminus of Urskog-Hølandsbanen also known as "Tertitten".

== Stomperud ==
A well known figure from Sørumsand is the cartoon character No. 91 Stomperud, who is portrayed at the Tertitten railway station.

== Orderud case ==
Sørumsand is likely most known for the Orderud case, a triple murder that likely generated the most media coverage of any Norwegian criminal case at the time.
