= Judicial review in Norway =

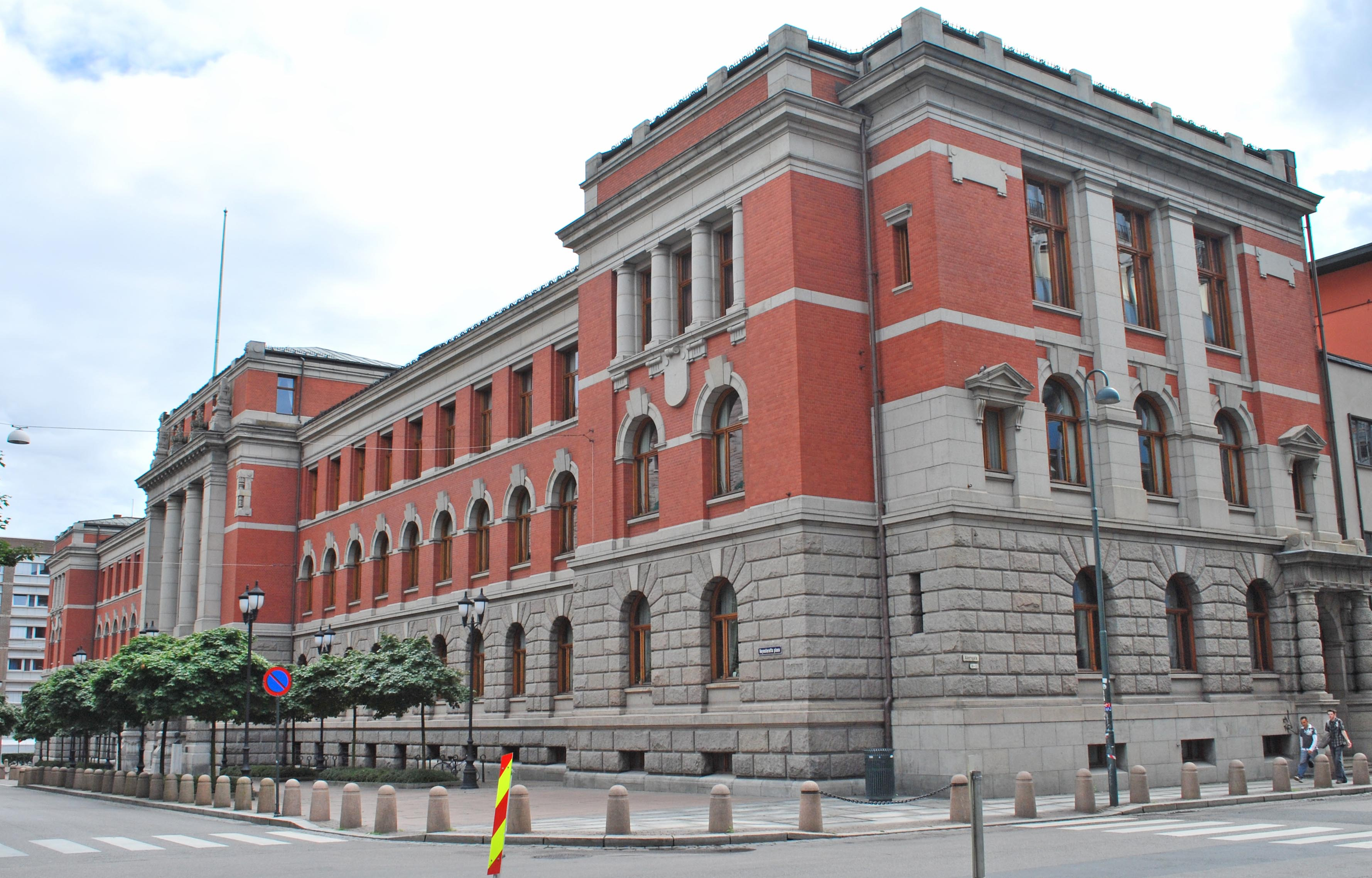
Supreme Court of Norway

Judicial review in Norway (Norwegian: Prøvingsrett) is the power of Norwegian courts to examine the actions of legislative and executive branches of government and determine whether they are consistent with the Constitution of Norway (Grunnloven).

Norway has one of the oldest traditions of judicial review in the world after the United States. Outside United States, the Supreme Court of Norway was the first national supreme court to assert the power to strike down parliamentary legislation that conflicted with National Constitution, establishing the practice through customary law in the mid-19th century till official amendment to Norwegian constitution in 2015 inserted Article 89, cementing judicial review in the constitution.

== History and origins ==
When the Norwegian Constitution was first drafted at Eidsvoll in 1814, it established the separation of powers among the Executive Branch (the King in Council), the legislative branch (the Storting), and the Judiciary (the Supreme Court). However the constitution did not explicitly grant the courts the power of judicial review. In early 19th century, European constitutional thought generally favored Parliamentary supremacy, and many believed that giving unelected judges the powers to strike down laws would be undemocratic.

The development of judicial review in Norway was influenced by American constitutionalism, particularly the landmark United States Supreme Court case Marbury v. Madison (1803).

=== 1866 Wedel Jarlsberg Case ===
In 1866 in Grev Wedel Jarlsberg v. Marinedepartementet, the Supreme Court of Norway was tasked with deciding a case where a parliamentary statute required certain naval officers to perform administrative duties without compensation, which the plaintiff argued was unconstitutional.

Chief Justice Peder Carl Lasson delivered the decisive vote, stating because courts cannot apply two conflicting laws simultaneously, they must necessarily give priority to the Constitution (as lex superior, or supreme law). Throughout the 19th century, Norwegian Legal scholars and Supreme Court Justices, most notably Chief Justice P.C. Lasson, debated the necessity of Judicial oversight to prevent Tyranny from majority.

=== 20th Century ===
In first few decades of 20th century, Norwegian Supreme Court entered what legal historian call its most active period of Judicial Review. As Norway rapidly industrialized, the government sought to regulate natural resources and private property for common good leading to friction between private owners.

==== Waterfall Case ====
The 1918 Waterfall Case was the defining case of this era, it dealt with the "Act of Concessions",

Private investors challenged the Industrial Concession Act of 1909 (one of the "Great Concession Laws"). The law allowed private companies (often backed by foreign capital) to buy waterfalls and build power plants, but with a strict condition: ownership of the waterfall and the power plant would revert to the Norwegian state without compensation after a set period.

The plaintiffs argued that taking property without paying for it at the end of the contract was in violation of article 105 of the Norwegian Constitution which forbids expropriation without full compensation. In a narrow 4–3 split decision, the Supreme court ruled in favor of the state. The majority held that the right of reversion was a valid condition for granting the concession, not an unconstitutional expropriation.

As labor and democratic movement grew in 1920s and 1930s, judicial review faced heavy political criticism. Many politicians viewed courts as conservative obstacles to necessary social and economic reforms, leading to parliamentary debates about abolishing the practice altogether

==== World War II ====
Following German invasion in April 1940, a civilian occupation regime was established under Reichskomissar Josef Tervoben. The regime quickly attempted to purge the courts and demanded that Norwegian Judges loyally enforce Nazi regulations. Terboven explicitly forbade courts from exercising judicial review over the regime's decree. Supreme Court led by Chief Justice Paal Berg, refused to comply.

In December 1940, the entire Supreme court collectively resigned. They stated that conceding their right and duty to review the legality of laws, including testing occupier's laws against international law (The Hague Regulations) would violate their professional oath.

=== Post-war era ===
After liberation in 1945, Norway entered a period of "Social Democratic Constitutionalism". The political landscape was dominated by a unified desire to rebuild the country and to establish a robust heavily regulated welfare state.

During this era, the Supreme Court exercised intense judicial restraint. Mindful of Democratic mandate of legislature and criticism of Judicial over reach during interwar period, the courts almost never found parliamentary legislation to be unconstitutional. The prevailing legal philosophy was that the Parliament, not unelected judges, should be primary interpreter of constitution when it came to economic planning and social policy.

=== The 1976 Kløfta Case ===
By 1970s many legal scholars had asserted that Judicial review was a dead letter and Norway had become a Parliamentary Supremacy. That changed dramatically in 1976 with the plenary Kløfta case (Rt. 1976 s. 1), which Re established Supreme court as an active constitutional check.

The case was centered on article 105 of the Norwegian Constitution. The government had expropriated land in the Kløfta area for development, and landowner argued that the statutory rules used to calculate his payout did not amount to "full compensation" as guaranteed by the constitution.

The Supreme Court set aside the legislation and ruled in favor of landowner. It definitively declared that judicial review was a binding customary constitutional law and that it was the courts' duty to intervene if the legislature crossed a constitutional line.

Most Importantly this case established the "Standard of Review" doctrine. the Kløfta case established how courts should balance judicial oversight with democratic lawmaking. The Court introduced a standard similar to the American "preferred position" doctrine. It stated that courts should grant Parliament a wide margin of appreciation regarding economic and social rights, but that courts should exercise strict, uncompromising review when it comes to fundamental personal liberties and human rights.

=== 2015 Codification ===
For exactly 149 years, Judicial review in Norway existed solely as an unwritten, customary practice established by courts. That changed during a massive human rights reform of constitution.

In May 2015, the Norwegian Parliament officially codified judicial review into the written text. By an overwhelming majority, they added Article 89 to the Constitution, which explicitly grants courts the right and duty to review whether laws and administrative decisions violate the Constitution. This move was designed to "bring rights back home," ensuring that the protection of human rights and the separation of powers possessed unimpeachable democratic legitimacy.

== Constitutional framework and procedure ==
Norway uses a decentralized and concrete system of Judicial review.

Decentralized in sense that unlike countries with specialized constitutional courts (like Germany or France), any ordinary court in Norway from district courts (tingrett) to the courts of appeal (lagmannsrett) has the authority and duty to review the constitutionality of the laws (similar to Judicial Review United States). However, the Supreme Court (Høyesterett) serves as the final arbiter.

Courts can only exercise judicial review in the context of an actual, concrete legal dispute between parties. They cannot issue advisory opinions or abstract rulings on legislation before it is enacted or applied. When the Supreme Court finds a law unconstitutional, the law is technically set aside only for that specific case, though the ruling creates a binding precedent.

== Interaction with international law ==
In recent decades, Norwegian judicial review has evolved into a "dual review" system due to the integration of international law. Following the adoption of the Human Rights Act of 1999, the European Convention on Human Rights (ECHR) and several UN human rights conventions were incorporated into domestic law.

These conventions were given "semi-constitutional" status, meaning they prevail over conflicting ordinary domestic statutes. Consequently, Norwegian courts frequently review legislation not only against the Norwegian Constitution but also against Norway's obligations under the ECHR and the European Economic Area (EEA) Agreement.

== See also ==
- Høyesterett case concerning the expropriation of land at Kløfta
- Grev Wedel Jarlsberg v. Marinedepartementet
- 1918 Waterfall Case (Norway)
