= Politics of Norway =

Politics of Norway Norges politiske system (Norwegian Bokmål) Noregs politiske system (Norwegian Nynorsk)
- Coat of arms of Norway
- Polity type: Unitary parliamentary constitutional monarchy
- Constitution: Constitution of Norway

Legislative branch
- Name: Storting
- Type: Unicameral
- Meeting place: Storting building
- Presiding officer: Masud Gharahkhani, President of the Storting

Executive branch
- Head of state
- Title: King
- Currently: Haakon VIII
- Appointer: Hereditary
- Head of government
- Title: Prime Minister
- Currently: Jonas Gahr Støre
- Appointer: Monarch
- Cabinet
- Name: Council of State
- Current cabinet: Støre cabinet
- Leader: Prime minister
- Appointer: Monarch
- Headquarters: Government Quarter
- Ministries: 17

Judicial branch
- Name: Judiciary of Norway
- Supreme Court
- Chief judge: Toril Marie Øie

The politics of Norway takes place in the framework of a parliamentary, representative democratic constitutional monarchy. Executive power is exercised by the king, Council of State, and the cabinet, led by the prime minister. Legislative power is vested in both the government and the legislature, elected in a multi-party system. The judiciary is independent of the executive branch and the legislature.

The Economist Intelligence Unit rated Norway a "full democracy" in 2022. According to the V-Dem Democracy indices Norway was 2023 the second most electoral democratic country in the world. Reporters Without Borders ranked Norway 1st in the world in the 2024 Press Freedom Index. Freedom House's 2020 Freedom in the World report classified Norway as "free", scoring maximum points in the categories of "political rights" and "civil liberties".

== Constitutional development ==
The Norwegian constitution, signed by the Eidsvoll assembly on 17 May 1814, transformed Norway from being an absolute monarchy into a constitutional monarchy. The 1814 constitution granted rights such as freedom of speech (§100) and rule of law (§§ 96, 97, 99). Important amendments include:

- 4 November 1814: Constitution reenacted in order to form a personal union with the king of Sweden
- 1851: Constitutional prohibition against admission of Jews lifted (see Jew clause)
- 1884: Parliamentarism has evolved since 1884 and entails that the cabinet must not have the parliament against it (an absence of mistrust, but an express of support is not necessary), and that the appointment by the King is a formality when there is a clear parliamentary majority. This parliamentary rule has the status of constitutional custom. All new laws are passed and all new governments are therefore formed de jure by the King, although not de facto. After elections resulting in no clear majority, the King appoints the new government de facto
- 1887: Prohibition against monastic orders lifted
- 1898: Universal male suffrage established
- 1905: Union with Sweden dissolved
- 1913: Universal suffrage established
- 1956: Religious freedom formalised and prohibition against Jesuits lifted (see Jesuit clause)
- 2004: New provision on freedom of expression, replacing the old § 100
- 2007: Removed the old system of division of Stortinget into the Odelsting and Lagting (took effect after the 2009 general election). Changes to the Court of Impeachment. Parliamentary system now part of the Constitution (previously this was only a constitutional custom) (new § 15)

== Executive branch ==
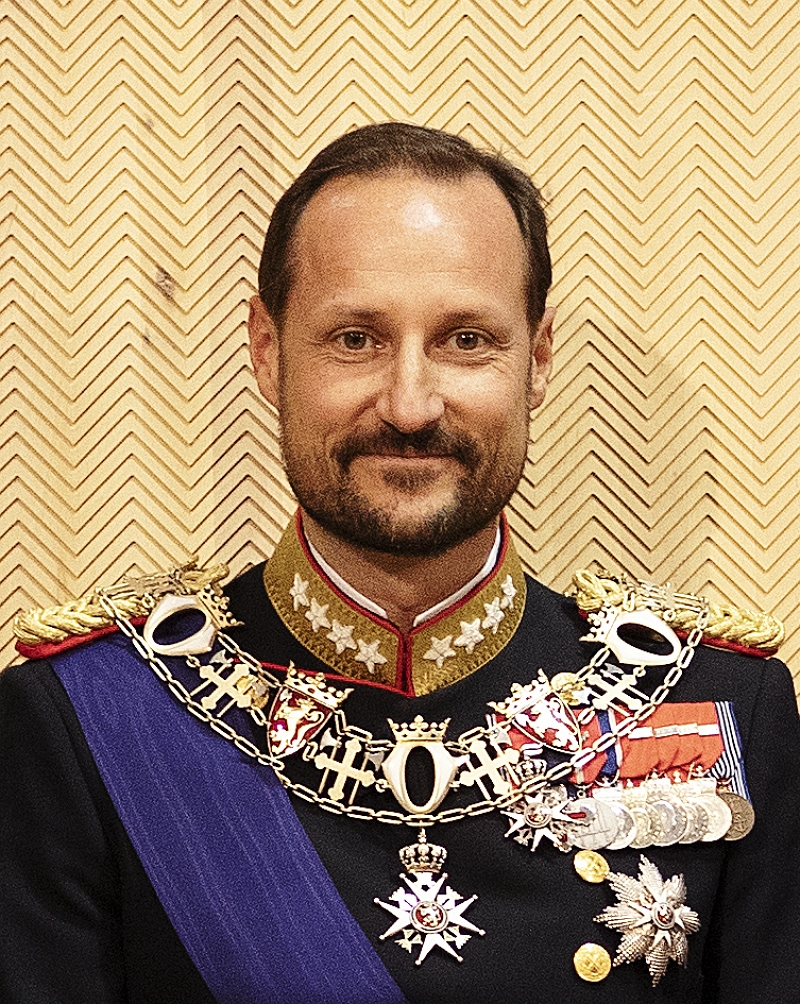
Haakon VIII has been King of Norway since 2026. The Norwegian king has mainly symbolic powers.

Main office-holders
Office	Name	Party	Since
King	Haakon VIII		28 August 2026
Prime Minister	Jonas Gahr Støre	Labour Party	14 October 2021

Norway is a constitutional monarchy, where the king, currently Haakon VIII has a mainly symbolic power. The royal house is a branch of the princely family of Schleswig-Holstein-Sonderburg-Glücksburg. The functions of the king are mainly ceremonial, but he has influence as the symbol of national unity. Although the constitution of 1814 grants important executive powers to the king, these are always exercised by the Council of State in the name of the king (King's Council, or cabinet). The king is also High Protector of the Church of Norway (the state church), Grand Master of the Royal Norwegian Order of St. Olav, and symbolically Supreme Commander of the Norwegian armed forces.

The Council of State is formally convened by the reigning monarch. The Council of State consists of the prime minister and his or her council, formally appointed by the king. Parliamentarism has evolved since 1884 and entails that the cabinet must not have the parliament against it, and that the appointment by the king is a formality. The council must have the confidence of the Norwegian legislative body, known as the Storting. In practice, the monarch will ask the leader of a parliamentary block that has a majority in the Storting to form a government. After elections resulting in no clear majority to any party or coalition, the leader of the party most likely to be able to form a government is appointed prime minister. Since World War II, most non-socialist governments have been coalitions, and Labour Party governments have often relied on the support of other parties to retain the necessary parliamentary votes.

The executive branch is divided into the following ministries:

- Office of the Prime Minister (Statsministerens kontor)
- Ministry of Agriculture and Food (Landbruks- og matdepartementet)
- Ministry of Children and Families (Barne- og familiedepartementet)
- Ministry of Culture and Equality (Kultur- og likestillingsdepartementet)
- Ministry of Defence (Forsvarsdepartementet)
- Ministry of Digitization and Administration (Digitaliserings- og forvaltningsdepartementet)
- Ministry of Education and Research (Kunnskapsdepartementet)
- Ministry of Climate and Environment (Klima- og miljødepartementet)
- Ministry of Finance (Finansdepartementet)
- Ministry of Trade, Industry and Fisheries (Nærings- og fiskeridepartementet)
- Ministry of Foreign Affairs (Utenriksdepartementet)
- Ministry of Health and Care Services (Helse- og omsorgsdepartementet)
- Ministry of Justice and Public Security (Justis- og beredskapsdepartementet)
- Ministry of Labour and Social Inclusion (Arbeids- og inkluderingsdepartementet)
- Ministry of Local and Regional Affairs (Kommunal- og distriktsdepartementet)
- Ministry of Energy (Energidepartementets)
- Ministry of Transport (Samferdselsdepartementet)

=== Governments 1935–1981 ===
The Labour Party has been the largest party in Parliament from the election of 1927 until the 2017 election. Labour formed their first brief minority government in 1928 which lasted for 18 days only. After the 1936 election the Labour Party formed a new minority government, which had to go into exile 1940–1945 because of the German occupation of Norway. After a brief trans-party government following the German capitulation in 1945, Labour gained a majority of the seats in parliament in the first post-war election of 1945.

Norway was ruled by Labour governments from 1945 to 1981, except for three periods (1963, 1965–1971, and 1972–1973). The Labour Party had a single party majority in the Storting from 1945 to 1961. Since then no party has single-handedly formed a majority government, hence minority and coalition governments have been the rule. After the centre-right Willoch government lost its parliamentary majority in the election of 1985, there were no majority governments in Norway until the second Stoltenberg government was formed after the 2005 election.

=== Governments 1981–2005 ===
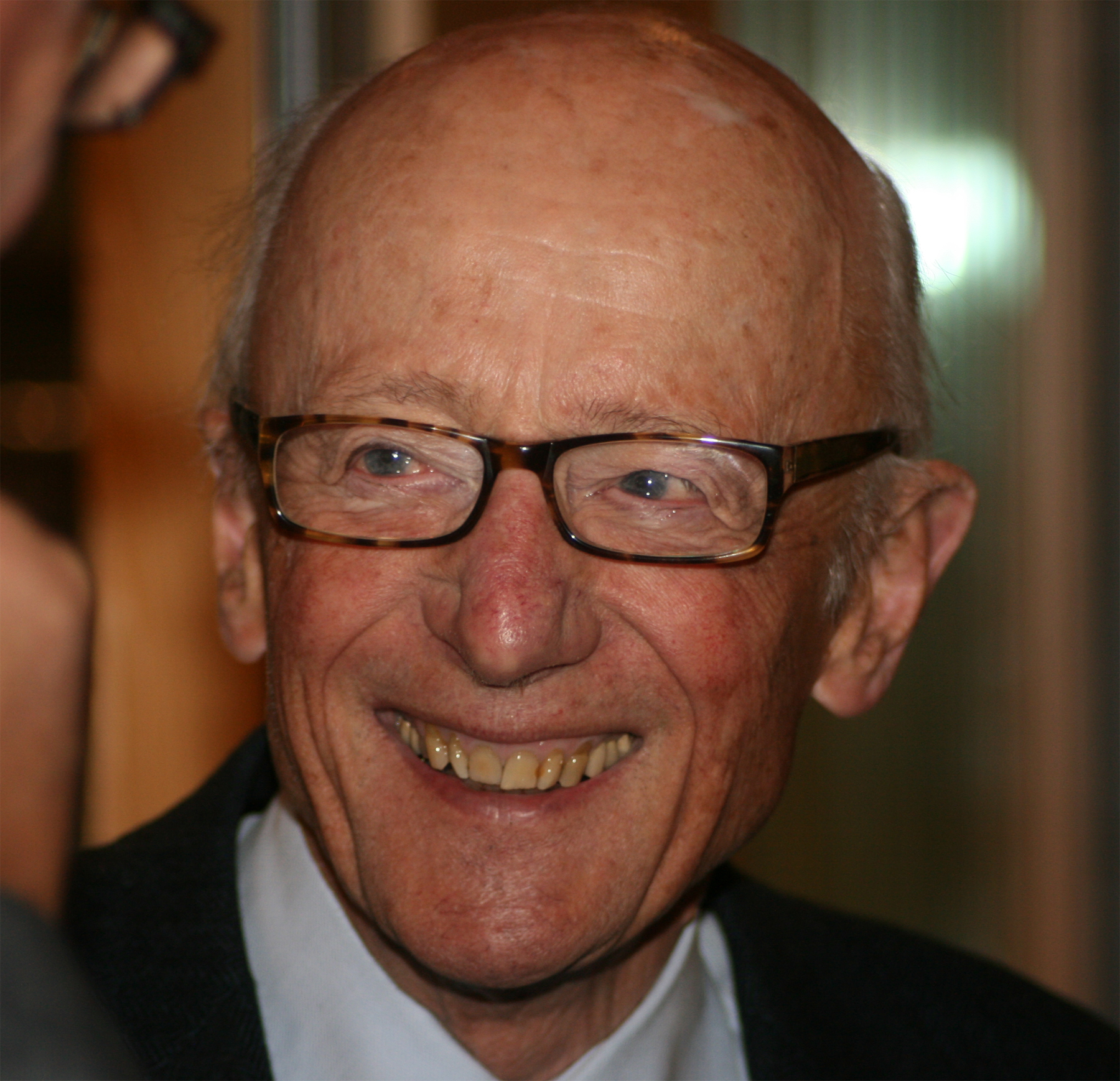
Kåre Willoch (Conservative Party) was Prime Minister from 1981 until 1986.

From 1981 to 1997, governments alternated between minority Labour governments and Conservative-led centre-right governments. The centre-right governments gained power in three out of four elections during this period (1981, 1985, 1989), whereas Labour toppled those governments twice between elections (1986, 1990) and stayed in power after one election (1993). Elections take place in September and governments change in October of election years.

Conservative leader Kåre Willoch formed a minority government after the election of 1981. In 1983, midway between elections, this government was expanded to a majority three-party coalition of the Conservatives, the Centre Party and the Christian Democrats. In the election of 1985 the coalition lost its majority but stayed in office until 1986, when it stepped down after losing a parliamentary vote on petrol taxes.

Labour leader Gro Harlem Brundtland served three periods as Prime Minister. First briefly from February 1981 until the election the same year, then from May 1986 to the election of 1989, and last from November 1990 until October 1996 when she decided to step out of domestic politics. Brundtland strongly influenced Norwegian politics and society during this period and was nicknamed the "national mother".

After the election of 1989 a centre-right coalition was formed with the same three parties as in 1983–1986, this time headed by Conservative leader Jan P. Syse. This coalition governed from 1989 to November 1990 when it collapsed from inside over the issue of Norwegian membership in the European Economic Area.

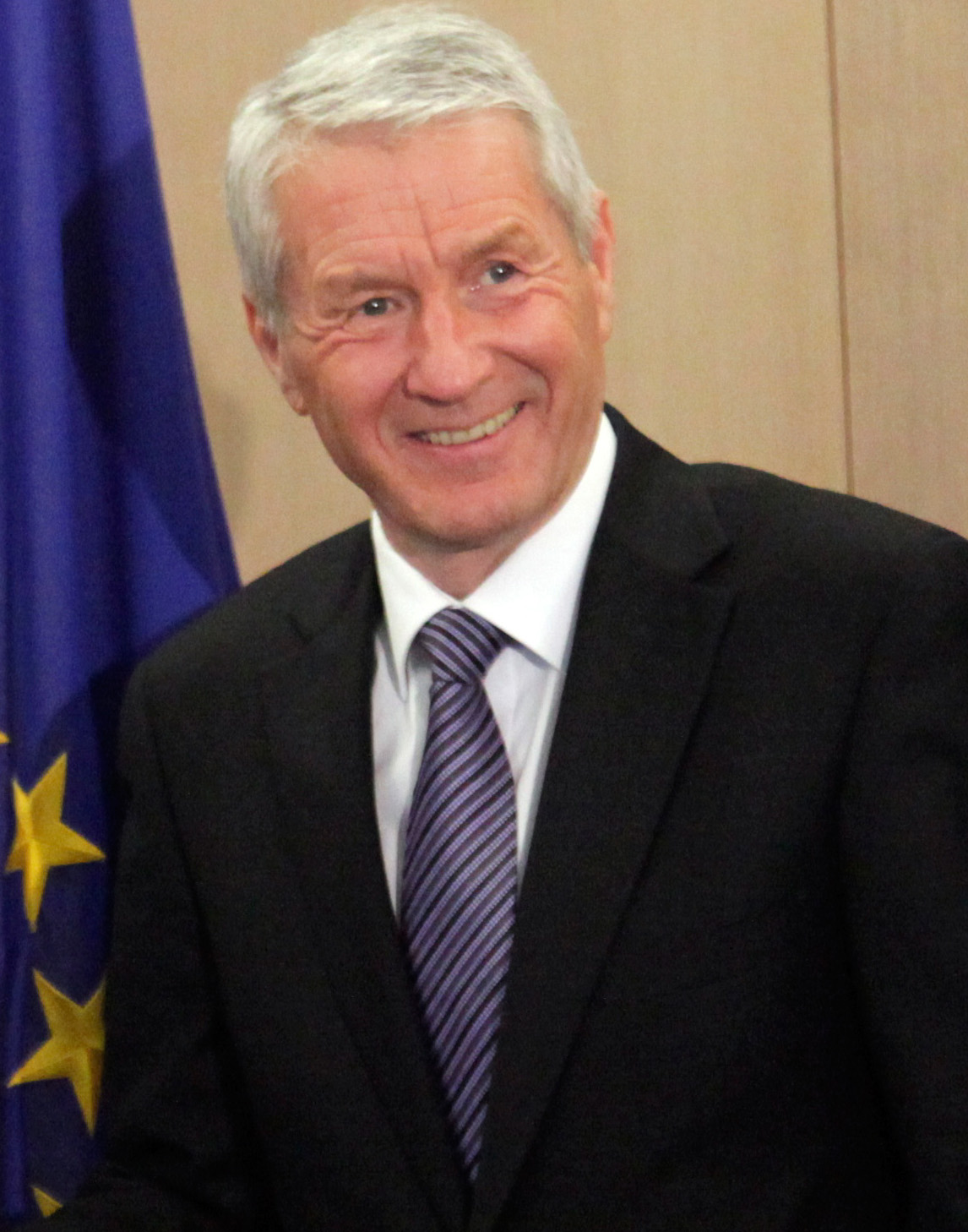
Thorbjørn Jagland (Labour) was Prime Minister 1996–97. He has later become Secretary General of the Council of Europe.

When Brundtland resigned in 1996, Labour leader Thorbjørn Jagland formed a new Labour government that stayed in office until October 1997 when he, after the September 1997 election, declared that his government would step down because the Labour Party failed to win at least 36.9% of the national vote – the percentage Labour had won in the 1993 election.

A three-party minority coalition of the Centre, Christian Democratic, and Liberal parties, headed by Christian Democrat Prime Minister Kjell Magne Bondevik, moved into office in October 1997. That government fell in March 2000 over the issue of proposed natural gas plants, opposed by Bondevik due to their impact on climate change.

The Labour Party's Jens Stoltenberg, a Brundtland protégé, took over in a minority Labour government but lost power in the September 2001 election when Labour posted its worst performance since World War I.

Bondevik once again became Prime Minister in 2001, this time as head of a minority coalition of the Conservatives, Christian Democrats and Liberals, a coalition dependent on support from the Progress Party. This coalition government was the first to stay in office for a complete four-year election period since Per Borten's coalition government of 1965–1969.

=== Cabinet 2005–2013 ===
A coalition between the Labour Party, Socialist Left Party, and Centre Party, took over from 17 October 2005 after the 2005 general election, where this coalition obtained a majority of 87 out of 169 seats in the Storting. Jens Stoltenberg became Prime Minister and formed a cabinet known as Stoltenberg's Second Cabinet.

This was a historical coalition in several aspects. It was the first time the Socialist Left sat in cabinet, the first time the Labour Party sat in a coalition government since the 1945 four-month post-war trans-party government (otherwise in government alone), and the first time the Centre Party sat in government along with socialist parties (otherwise in coalition with conservative and other centre parties).

In the 2009 general election the coalition parties kept the majority in the Storting by winning 86 out of 169 seats. Stoltenberg's second cabinet thus continued. There have been several reshuffles in the cabinet during its existence.

=== Cabinet 2013–2021 ===
In the 2013 election, the incumbent red–green coalition government obtained 72 seats and lost its majority. The election ended with a victory for the four opposition non-socialist parties, winning a total of 96 seats out of 169 (85 needed for a majority). Following convention, Stoltenberg's government resigned and handed over power in October 2013. The Labour Party, however, remained the largest party in parliament with 30.8% of the popular vote. The Progress Party also lost ground, but nevertheless participates in the new cabinet led by Conservative Prime Minister Erna Solberg. Among the smaller parties, the centrist Liberal Party and Christian Peoples Party hold the balance of power. Both campaigned on a change in government. On 30 September the two smaller parties announced that they would support a minority coalition of the Conservative and Progress parties, but they would not take seats in the cabinet themselves. The new Erna Solberg government was re-elected in 2017. In January 2020, right-wing Progress Party left the government. Prime Minister Erna Solberg continued with a minority government consisting of three coalition partners — her own Conservatives, the centrist Liberal Party and the Christian Democrats.

=== Current cabinet ===
In the 2021 election, the incumbent Solberg cabinet lost its majority. Jonas Gahr Støre of the Labour Party formed a minority coalition government with the Centre Party. The government relies on the support of the Socialist Left Party in order to secure a majority. On 14 October 2021, Jonas Gahr Støre, the leader of Norway's center-left Labor Party, was sworn in as new Prime Minister of Norway. His center-left minority government included ten women and nine men.

See also the category Norwegian politicians and list of Norwegian governments.

== Legislative branch ==
Norway has a unicameral parliament, the Storting ("Great Council"), with members elected by popular vote for a four-year term (during which it may not be dissolved) by proportional representation in multi-member constituencies. Voting rights are granted in the year a person turns 18.

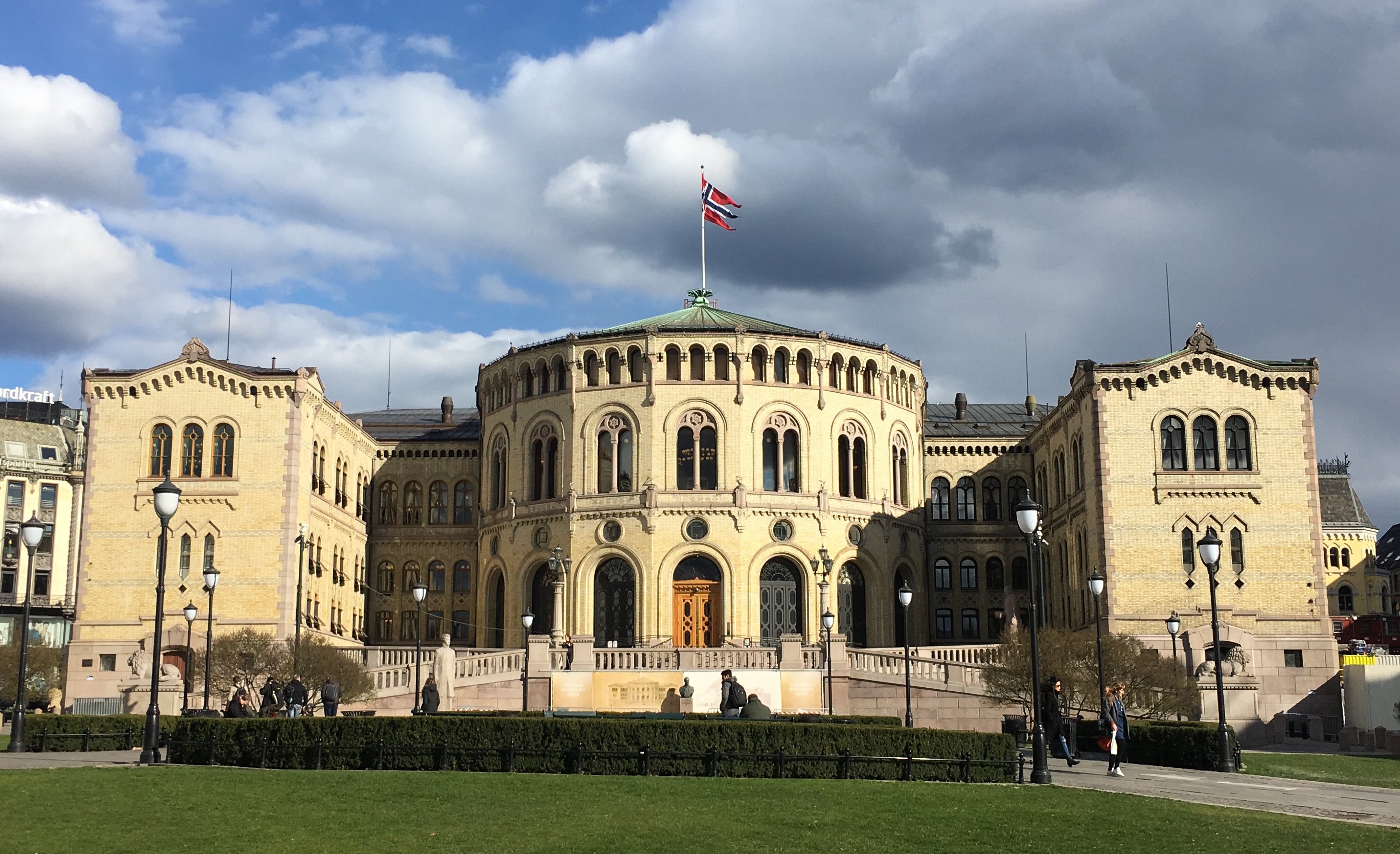
Stortinget, Oslo

The Storting currently has 169 members (increased from 165, effective from the elections of 12 September 2005). The members are elected from the 19 counties for four-year terms according to a system of proportional representation. Until 2009, the Storting divided itself into two chambers, the Odelsting and the Lagting for the sole purpose of voting on legislation. Laws were proposed by the government through a member of the Council of State or by a member of the Odelsting and decided on by the Odelsting and Lagting, in case of repeated disagreement by the joint Storting. In practice, the Lagting rarely disagreed and mainly just rubber-stamped the Odelsting's decision. In February 2007, the Storting passed a constitutional amendment to repeal the division, which abolished the Lagting for the 2009 general election, thereby establishing a fully unicameral system.

== Political parties and elections ==
Distribution of seats after the 2025 election: Red Party (9); Socialist Left Party (9); Labour Party (53); Green Party (8); Centre Party (9); Liberal Party (3); Christian Democratic Party (7); Conservative Party (24); Progress Party (47)

Elections are to be held every four years on the second Monday of September.

Monthly national election poll results.

Monthly national election poll results for the smaller parties.

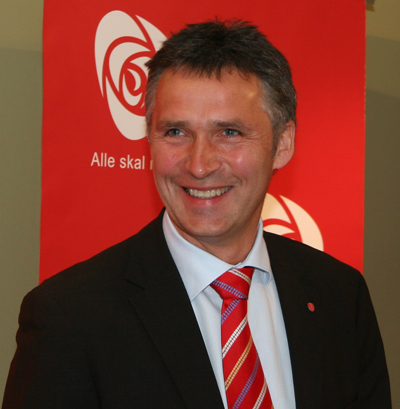
Jens Stoltenberg (Labour) was Prime Minister of Norway 2005–2013.

== Judicial branch ==
The Norwegian legal system is a mixture of customary law, civil law system, and common law traditions; the Supreme Court renders advisory opinions to legislature when asked; accepts compulsory ICJ jurisdiction, with reservations.

The regular courts include the Supreme Court (Høyesterett) with 18 permanent judges and a president, courts of appeal (court of second instance in most cases), city and county courts (court of first instance in most cases), and conciliation councils (court of first instance in most civil-code cases). Judges attached to the regular courts are appointed by the King in council after nomination by the Ministry of Justice.

The special High Court of the Realm (Riksrett) hears impeachment cases against members of the government, parliament, or Supreme Court. Following an amendment to the Norwegian constitution in February 2007, impeachment cases are heard by the five highest ranking Supreme Court justices and six lay members in one of the Supreme Court courtrooms The High Court of the Realm had generally lost most of its significance after 1884, and this institution has been passive ever since 1927. The new system is meant to restore the Riksrett to its earlier significance.

== Impeachment ==
Impeachment may be brought against Members of the Council of State, or of the Supreme Court or of the Storting, for criminal offenses which they may have committed in their official capacity. Indictments are raised by the Storting and judged by five Supreme Court justices and six lay judges.

== Administrative divisions ==
Civil servant recruitment procedure

- Public advertisement of positions: All civil service positions are required to be advertised publicly, as mandated by the Civil Service Act, Section 4. Exceptions to this requirement are limited and must be legally justified, such as temporary positions lasting up to six months or specific cases outlined in collective agreements.

- Qualification principle: Central to the hiring process is the qualification principle, stipulated in Section 3 of the Civil Service Act. This principle mandates that the candidate with the best overall qualifications—considering education, experience, and personal suitability—be selected for the position. The criteria specified in the job posting serve as the basis for evaluating applicants.

- Transparency and appeals: The process emphasizes transparency, allowing applicants to access information about other candidates, such as names, ages, and qualifications. While direct appeals against hiring decisions are generally not permitted, applicants who believe procedural errors occurred can bring their concerns to the employer or relevant authorities. Additionally, cases involving potential discrimination can be addressed by the Equality and Anti-Discrimination Ombud.

Public workforce composition

According to the OECD's Government at a Glance report, in 2021, the size of general government employment accounted for 30.92% of Norway's total workforce, the highest proportion among OECD countries. Sweden followed with 29.27%, while Denmark and Finland reported similarly high shares at 28.04% and 25.41%, respectively. In contrast, South Korea and Japan had the lowest levels of general government employment among OECD countries, with government employment comprising only 8.83% and 4.55% of total employment, respectively.

Regarding gender representation, in 2020, Norway had the third-highest share of women in public sector employment among OECD countries in 2020, with women accounting for 69.99% of the public sector workforce. Sweden ranked the highest at 77.51%, followed by Finland at 72.19%.

In Norway, most public sector employees worked in local government as of 2023, with a total of 574,498 employees, while the central government employed 328,959 individuals.

In terms of salaries, the central government sector in Norway offered the highest average monthly pay in 2022, with men earning 61,370 Norwegian kroner and women earning approximately 54,620 kroner. In the local government sector, men earned an average of 49,420 kroner, while women earned 46,640 kroner.

Employment benefits

Holiday leave: In Norway, the Holiday Act (Ferieloven) ensures that all employees are entitled to holiday leave and holiday pay. Employees can take 25 working days of leave each year, which equals four weeks and one day, as all days except Sundays. To qualify for the full leave, employees must start work by September 30; those starting after October 1 get six days of leave for that year. Holiday pay is based on earnings from the previous year. The standard rate is 10.2% of annual earnings, but it increases to 12% for employees with five weeks of leave (often through agreements) and 12.5% for employees over 60 who get an extra week of leave.

Parental leave: The Norwegian Working Environment Act provides parents with extensive leave rights to support family life. Pregnant employees are entitled to up to twelve weeks of leave during pregnancy, and mothers are required to take six weeks of leave after childbirth unless medically cleared to return to work earlier. Fathers are entitled to two weeks of leave to assist the mother, which may be transferred to another individual helping if the father is unavailable. Parents are jointly entitled to twelve months of leave, with an additional twelve months available to each parent immediately afterward. Single parents may take up to two years of leave. Adoptive and foster parents are granted the same rights, except in cases of stepchild adoption or if the child is over 15 years old.

The parental benefit period offers 49 weeks at full compensation (100% of income) or 59 weeks at a reduced rate (80% of income). For adoptive parents, the benefit period is shorter, providing 46 weeks at full compensation or 56 weeks at the reduced rate. To be eligible for parental benefits, individuals must be members of the Norwegian National Insurance Scheme.

Public organizational structure

The Constitution of Norway, established in 1814, defines the country as a monarchy with power divided among three branches: a legislative branch which is also responsible for appropriations, the Storting; an executive branch, the government; and a judicial branch, the courts of law.

The king serves as the head of state, with his role primarily ceremonial and representative. Although the constitution states "the executive power is vested in the king", this authority is exercised by the government. The king performs important formal duties, such as officially opening the parliament each year and presiding over the Council of State. He also plays a significant role during government transitions and formally receives the credentials of newly appointed ambassadors during official audiences at the royal palace.

Executive authority has a three-tier administrative framework: the central or national level, the regional or county level, and the local or municipal level.

Central government

The central government of Norway encompasses the Office of the Prime Minister and 16 ministries. It is responsible for national policymaking, drafting legislation (approved by the Storting), and overseeing the implementation of laws and policies through various ministries and agencies.

Responsibilities of the central government

- The national insurance scheme

- Specialised health services (hospitals)

- Higher education/universities, labour market, refugees and immigrants

- National road network, railways, agricultural issues, environmental issues

- Police, courts, prisons, armed forces, foreign policy

- Specialised social services

Local government

Local democracy is strong in Norway, and local government is well-established. The Alderman Act of 1837 first set out the rights and duties of local authorities. Both municipalities and counties hold elections in which representatives are chosen by the people and are responsible to them. Oslo, the capital, is officially a municipality but also performs the responsibilities of a county authority. While municipalities and county authorities share the same administrative status, the central government has overall authority and oversees their administration.

Norway operates a two-tier local government system, consisting of municipalities and county authorities. As of January 1, 2024, there are 15 counties, an increase from 11 in 2023. This change is due to the division of Viken into the counties of Akershus, Buskerud, and Østfold. Similarly, Vestfold and Telemark have been separated into individual counties, as have Troms and Finnmark. These adjustments reverse mergers that were introduced in 2020. Norway also comprises 357 municipalities.

The 15 mainland counties (fylker, singular fylke): Agder, Innlandet, Møre og Romsdal, Nordland, Oslo, Rogaland, Trøndelag, Vestland, Akershus, Østfold, Buskerud, Vestfold, Telemark, Troms, and Finnmark. In addition are the island group Svalbard and the island Jan Mayen.

Counties and municipalities have local autonomy, but this autonomy is circumscribed by national controls. Counties and municipalities are subject to the oversight of a governor (statsforvalter) appointed by the King in the Council of State. One governor exercises authority in both Oslo and the adjacent county of Viken. Each county has a directly elected county assembly, led by a mayor, which decides upon matters falling within purview of the counties (upper secondary and vocational education, some culture, transport and social services). There is also a governor (sysselmester) on Svalbard, who is under the Ministry of Foreign Affairs and not the Ministry of Local Government and Regional Development as the other counties.

Responsibilities of county authorities

- Upper secondary school • Regional development

- County roads and public transport

- Regional planning and business development

- Culture (museums, libraries, sports)

- Cultural heritage

- Environmental issues

Responsibilities of municipalities

- Primary and lower-secondary school

- Nurseries/kindergartens

- Primary healthcare

- Care for the elderly and disabled, social services

- Local planning, agricultural issues, environmental issues, local roads, harbours

- Water supply, sanitation and sewer

- Culture and business development

== Dependent areas ==
Norway has three dependent areas, all in or near Antarctica: Bouvet Island in the South Atlantic Ocean, Queen Maud Land in Antarctica, and Peter I Island off West Antarctica. The Norwegian Act of 27 February 1930 declares these areas are subject to Norwegian sovereignty as dependencies.

An attempt to annex East Greenland ended in defeat at the Hague Tribunal in 1933.

== Public participation mechanisms ==
Norway's governance system is internationally recognized for its emphasis on public participation, transparency, and inclusivity. These principles are rooted in the country's democratic tradition, originating with the 1814 Norwegian Constitution, one of the oldest democratic constitutions in the world. This constitution not only laid the foundation for participatory democracy but also empowered the Storting (Norwegian parliament) and strengthened electoral systems, ensuring that citizens play a direct role in governance.

Public participation in Norway is facilitated through a combination of legal frameworks and structured mechanisms. These ensure that citizens' voices are heard at every level of government, from local municipalities to national policymaking bodies.

=== Historical context of public participation ===
Norway's transition to a constitutional monarchy in 1814 marked the beginning of its participatory governance system. The 1814 Norwegian Constitution established foundational democratic principles such as the separation of powers, free elections, and civil liberties. Over time, Norway has continuously refined its governance mechanisms to ensure that citizens remain active participants in the democratic process.

In 1837, the enactment of the Formannskapslovene (Municipalities Act) established local self-governance, granting municipalities significant autonomy and encouraging grassroots public participation. This system allowed municipal councils to address local issues independently, fostering robust local governance. Over time, the role of municipal councils has remained central to public participation, enabling citizens to engage directly with local governance and decision-making processes.

=== Legal frameworks supporting public participation ===
Public participation in Norway is supported by several key pieces of legislation:

The Local Government Act (2018): This act establishes the responsibilities of municipalities and counties to foster citizen engagement. It mandates that local governments provide platforms for public input during planning and decision-making processes. For instance, municipal councils are required to hold public hearings and consult citizens before approving major development projects.

The Freedom of Information Act (2009): Transparency is a cornerstone of public trust in Norway's governance. This act ensures that citizens have access to government documents, promoting transparency and accountability. Allowing citizens to request information, enhances informed participation and supports trust in governmental processes.

The Environmental Information Act (2003): This law grants citizens the right to access environmental data from both public and private entities. It has been instrumental in empowering environmental advocacy groups and enabling citizens to participate in discussions on sustainability and climate change.

These laws collectively create an environment where citizens can engage with their government in a meaningful way, ensuring that governance is responsive to public needs and concerns.

=== Mechanisms for citizen engagement ===
Norway employs various mechanisms to facilitate public participation. These mechanisms are designed to ensure active citizen engagement in governance, ranging from traditional consultations to innovative digital approaches.

==== Municipal planning and local engagement ====
Municipalities play a critical role in facilitating public participation in Norway. Citizens are often invited to contribute to local planning processes, particularly in areas such as urban development, education, and transportation.

For example, urban renewal projects in Trondheim incorporated extensive public input. Residents are encouraged to provide feedback on proposed designs, ensuring that development plans reflect community priorities.

==== Citizen surveys and panels ====
The Norwegian Citizen Panel, managed by the University of Bergen, is an example of how technology can enhance public participation. This web-based platform conducts regular surveys to collect data on public opinion regarding societal issues. The results are used by policymakers to gauge public sentiment and identify areas of concern.

Citizen panels are also employed at the local level. These panels bring together a diverse group of residents to deliberate on complex policy issues. Their recommendations often influence municipal decision-making, demonstrating the value of inclusive governance.

==== Public consultations ====
Public consultations are a cornerstone of Norway's participatory governance model. These consultations allow citizens to provide feedback on proposed legislation and policies, ensuring that their perspectives are considered before decisions are finalized.

An example of the effectiveness of public consultations is Norway's response to the COVID-19 pandemic. The government conducted extensive consultations with health experts, civil society organizations, and the general public, which enhanced the response's effectiveness and strengthened public trust in government actions. This trust played a key role in successful crisis management, reflected in 80% of citizens expressing satisfaction with healthcare, 12 points above the OECD average (2022).

==== Civil society organizations ====
Civil society organizations (CSOs) in Norway act as intermediaries between citizens and the government. These organizations represent diverse interests, from environmental advocacy to gender equality. CSOs also play a critical role in public debates often organizing workshops, seminars, and public forums to create spaces where citizens can engage in meaningful dialogue on policy issues.

For example, the Norwegian Association for Women's Rights has been instrumental in promoting gender equality through lobbying and public awareness campaigns. By addressing societal issues, CSOs help ensure that public concerns are included in the policymaking process. Their activities foster a collaborative relationship between the public and the government, contributing to more inclusive governance.

==== Non-governmental organizations ====
Non-governmental organizations (NGOs) in Norway significantly influence policymaking by advocating for a variety of interests and ensuring diverse perspectives are considered. These organizations often work closely with government bodies, providing expertise and contributing to the development of policies addressing societal needs.

The Norwegian Red Cross plays a vital role in policy discussions on disaster preparedness and public health. By participating in the formulation and implementation of policies, NGOs help shape initiatives that address pressing societal challenges. Their involvement ensures that policies are informed by a broad range of voices and experiences, fostering solutions that are both inclusive and effective.

==== Digital platforms ====
Digital technology has transformed how citizens engage with the government in Norway, with platforms like DigiUng and Ung.no specifically designed to engage younger demographics. Ung.no, for instance, serves as a central hub for government services and information targeting individuals aged 13 to 20. It offers quality-assured resources, guidance, and a question-and-answer service that allows users to seek personalized support.

The platform is an example of cross-sector collaboration and the use of digital tools to effectively target specific groups. In 2023, Ung.no recorded over 21.9 million visits and approximately 110,000 inquiries, demonstrating its significant reach and impact. By centralizing services and fostering youth participation, platforms like Ung.no enhance civic engagement and ensure public administration remains accessible and relevant to the next generation.

==== Social media engagement ====
Social media has become a powerful tool for public engagement in Norway, enabling direct interaction between citizens and local governments. For instance, the Nesodden municipality uses platforms like Facebook to maintain communication with residents, providing a forward-thinking example of how local governments can foster real-time dialogue and transparency.

Municipalities use social media to create a sense of inclusion for residents, and hope that these actions allow for better transparency and hearing of the people's voices.

== Managing performance and accountability ==
Norway's public sector reforms have been shaped by globalization, economic shifts, and administrative challenges. The adoption of New Public Management (NPM) in the 1980s and 1990s aligned governance with global trends, emphasizing performance, efficiency, and accountability. Inspired by international models, particularly from the United Kingdom and New Zealand, Norway introduced performance-based management and decentralization

Administrative inefficiencies and rising public expectations also drove reforms. Traditional bureaucratic structures were seen as rigid, costly, and ineffective, prompting demands for greater transparency and improved services. Norway responded with institutional restructuring, digital governance, and service delivery improvements to enhance responsiveness

Economic shifts, including fluctuating oil revenues, influenced governance strategies. To ensure fiscal sustainability and efficiency, the government adopted budgetary optimization and performance-based management. Broader economic pressures in the 1980s and 1990s, including global recessions and rising welfare costs, accelerated the use of cost-control measures, performance budgeting, and accountability mechanisms

Norway's performance measurements follow NPM principles, emphasizing goal setting, monitoring, and evaluation through measurable indicators like service efficiency and operational outcomes

=== Performance measurement systems ===
Norway's Management by Objective Results (MBOR) framework, aligned with New Public Management (NPM) principles, emphasizes goal setting, monitoring, and structured evaluation to enhance government efficiency and accountability

==== Core components of MBOR ====
• Annual activity plans: Each agency outlines strategic priorities and performance targets. For example, the Norwegian Health Directorate sets annual goals for reducing hospital wait times and improving patient satisfaction

• Performance indicators: 1. Cost-efficiency ratios in public services, 2. Operational: Patient treatment rates in hospitals, 3. Service-oriented: Citizen satisfaction surveys and service delivery metrics

• Steering dialogues: ministries and subordinate agencies engage in continuous performance reviews to align goals with policy priorities

==== MBOR has evolved through key policy reforms ====
1. 1986 – Budget Reforms: Introduced productivity-oriented budgeting, giving agencies greater autonomy in resource allocation, 2. 1990 - MBOR Mandate: Required all public-sector units to adopt annual activity plans, strengthening political control and goal-setting clarity, 3. 1991 - Salary Reforms: Linked administrative leaders' pay to performance, with compensation tied to individual contracts and annual assessments, 4. 1996 - New Government Financial Regulations: Formalized "Letters of Allocation", contract-like agreements defining budget resources, objectives, and performance indicators

=== Accountability mechanisms ===
==== National Audit Office ====
The National Audit of Norway (NAO Norway) is the independent audit agency of the Storting (Norwegian parliament), ensuring financial accountability and transparency. It conducts government audits, and performance reviews, and monitors state-owned enterprises to ensure compliance with financial regulations and parliamentary decisions.

Audit by the NAO revealed significant issues in Norway's performance-based financing (PBF) system. Key findings included:

• Misclassified cases: 41% of pneumonia cases were misclassified, requiring one in four admissions to be reassigned to a new Diagnosis-Related Group (DRG). This led to funding discrepancies and inefficiencies in resource allocation.

• Coding inconsistencies: Post-audit, pneumonia cases decreased from 2.7 to 2.3 conditions per admission, and hip replacements dropped from 1.5 to 1.0, highlighting systemic coding errors (see Table 4).

• Recommendations: The NAO called for improved coding accuracy, stricter oversight, and enhanced financial controls to ensure accurate reporting and fiscal accountability in Norway's healthcare sector.

==== Civil ombudsman ====
Sivilombudsmannen established in 1962, and appointed by the Storting, ensures fair administrations, protects individual rights, and uploads human rights standards in public governance. Unlike non-parliamentary ombudsmen in other countries, the Norwegian model operates independently from executive influence and reports directly to Parliament

Performance In 2021, the ombudsman handled 4,032 complaints, resolving 50% through administrative corrections. It conducted 26 own-initiative investigations on prison monitoring, police access, and case processing delays, recommending procedural improvements

==== Public consultation platforms ====
Høyringar allows citizens, organizations, and businesses to provide input on laws, regulations, and policies, ensuring transparency and public transportation.

Key stages of the process 1. Proposal submission: ministries publish draft laws and policies, 2. Public notification: Proposals are available on the consultation portal (Høringsportalen), 3. Feedback collection: stakeholders and the public submit opinions and recommendations digitally, 4. Review: The government evaluates feedback and adjusts proposals, 5. Final decision: revised proposals proceed to Parliament or administrative adoption.

=== Result-oriented reforms ===
Between 2000 and 2020, Norway adopted several performance-driven reforms to enhance public sector efficiency, service delivery, and governance.

==== Healthcare sector reforms (2002 and 2012) ====
The 2002 hospital reform centralized public hospital ownership under the Ministry of Health while granting management autonomy to regional and local health enterprises. The reform aimed to improve efficiency and implement performance-based governance.

The 2012 collaboration reform sought to improve coordination between municipal primary care and government-controlled secondary care through performance-based incentives, contracts, and agreements.

Results: The Faster Return to Work (FRW) scheme introduced in 2007 reduced waiting times by 12–15 days and shortened sick leave by approximately 8 days on average. Surgical patients in the FRW scheme had 15–23 days shorter sick leave periods compared to those on regular waiting lists.

==== Welfare administration reform (2005-2007) ====
The 2005 welfare administration reform merged central government pensions and labor agencies into a single national entity, streamlining social welfare administration. A local partnership agreement was introduced integrating municipal social welfare bodies to enhance service coordination. By 2007, regional pension offices and administrative units were established, shifting certain responsibilities from local to regional levels of employment.

==== Police sector reforms (2001 and 2015) ====
The 2001 reform centralized police governance under a central agency, and reduced the number of police districts from 54 to 27. The 2015 community police reform further consolidated police districts to 12, and local units from 350 to 210, aiming to strengthen emergency response.

==== Regional and municipal reforms (2015 and 2020) ====
The 2015 Norwegian municipal reform aimed to consolidate municipalities from 428 to 356 due to local resistance. The 2020 regional reform reduced counties from 19 to 11, though few new responsibilities were transferred.

==== Digitalization and trust reforms (2020) ====
The establishment of the Digitalization Agency in 2020 aimed to accelerate public sector digital transformation and enhance coordination, efficiency, and citizen services.

In 2021, trust reform was introduced, inspired by similar reforms in Denmark and Sweden. It aimed to reduce market-driven governance, enhance collaboration with labor organizations, and increase public sector employee involvement in decision-making.

==== Education reforms (2020) ====
The National Testing and Evaluation System was introduced by the Norwegian Directorate for Education and Training in 2020 to measure school and student performance.

Impact of reform: Dropout rates in upper secondary education (VGO) have declined due to improved evaluation measures and targeted policies. The reform enhances early intervention and personalized learning to support student success.

Results

• Mathematics performance: Norway ranks 3rd out of 38 OECD countries with a 97.1% variation, among the highest compared to the OECD average.

• Reading performance: Norway ranks 11th out of 38 OECD countries, with an 88% variation, also among the largest in OECD assessments.

== International organization participation ==
AfDB, AsDB, Australia Group, BIS, CBSS, CE, CERN, EAPC, EBRD, ECE, EFTA, ESA, FAO, IADB, IAEA, IBRD, ICAO, ICCt, ICC, ICFTU, ICRM, IDA, IEA, IFAD, IFC, International IDEA, IFRCS, IHO, ILO, IMF, International Maritime Organization, Inmarsat, Intelsat, Interpol, IOC, IOM, ISO, ITU, MINURSO, NAM (guest), NATO, NC, NEA, NIB, NSG, OECD, OPCW, OSCE, PCA, UN, UNCTAD, UNESCO, UNHCR, UNIDO, UNMIBH, UNMIK, UNMOP, UNTSO, UPU, WCO, WEU (associate), WHO, WIPO, WMO, WTO, Zangger Committee.

== See also ==
- Hate speech laws in Norway
