= Judiciary of Norway =

Overview of Norwegian judiciary

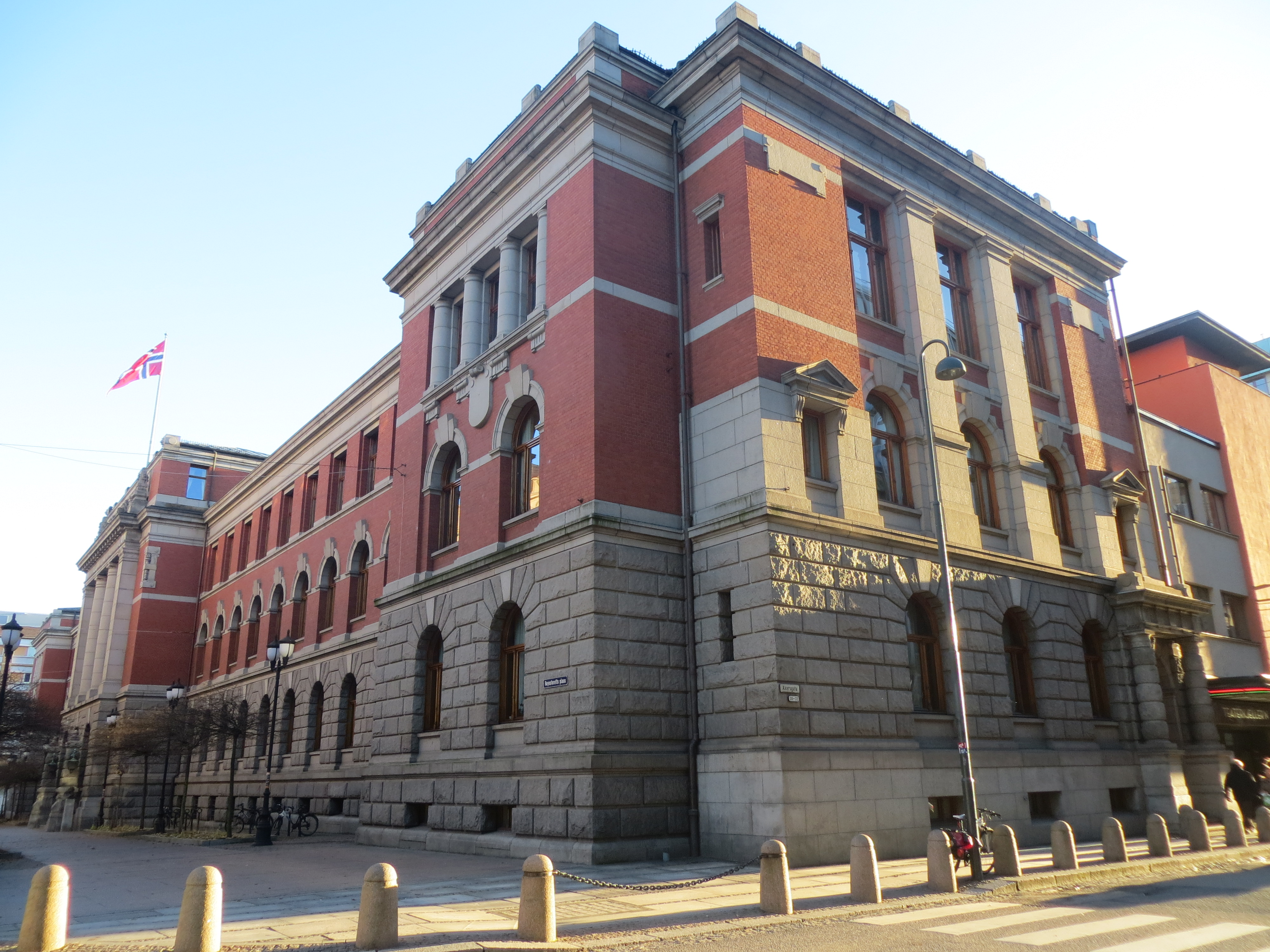
The Supreme Court building in Oslo

The judiciary of Norway is hierarchical with the Supreme Court at the apex. The conciliation boards only hear certain types of civil cases. The district courts are deemed to be the first instance of the Courts of Justice. Jury (high) courts are the second instance, and the Supreme Court is the third instance.

== Courts ==
The structure of the courts of justice is hierarchical, with the Supreme Court at the apex. The conciliation boards only hear certain types of civil cases. The district courts are deemed to be the first instance of the Courts of Justice. Jury (high) courts are the second instance and the Supreme Court is the third instance.

=== Supreme Court ===
The Supreme Court is Norway's highest court of justice and the instance of appeal for verdicts handed down by courts of a lower level. The court is situated in Oslo. The decisions made here are final and cannot be appealed or complained against. The only exception is for cases that can be brought before the Court for Human Rights in Strasbourg. The King of Norway has sole authority to appoint judges to the country’s Supreme Court and other senior courts. He does so on the advice of the country's Judicial Appointments Board, a body whose members are also appointed by the King.

==== Interlocutory Appeals Committee ====
Three of the Supreme Court judges form the Interlocutory Appeals Committee. This committee has to agree that a case is to be brought before the Supreme Court.

=== Courts of appeal ===
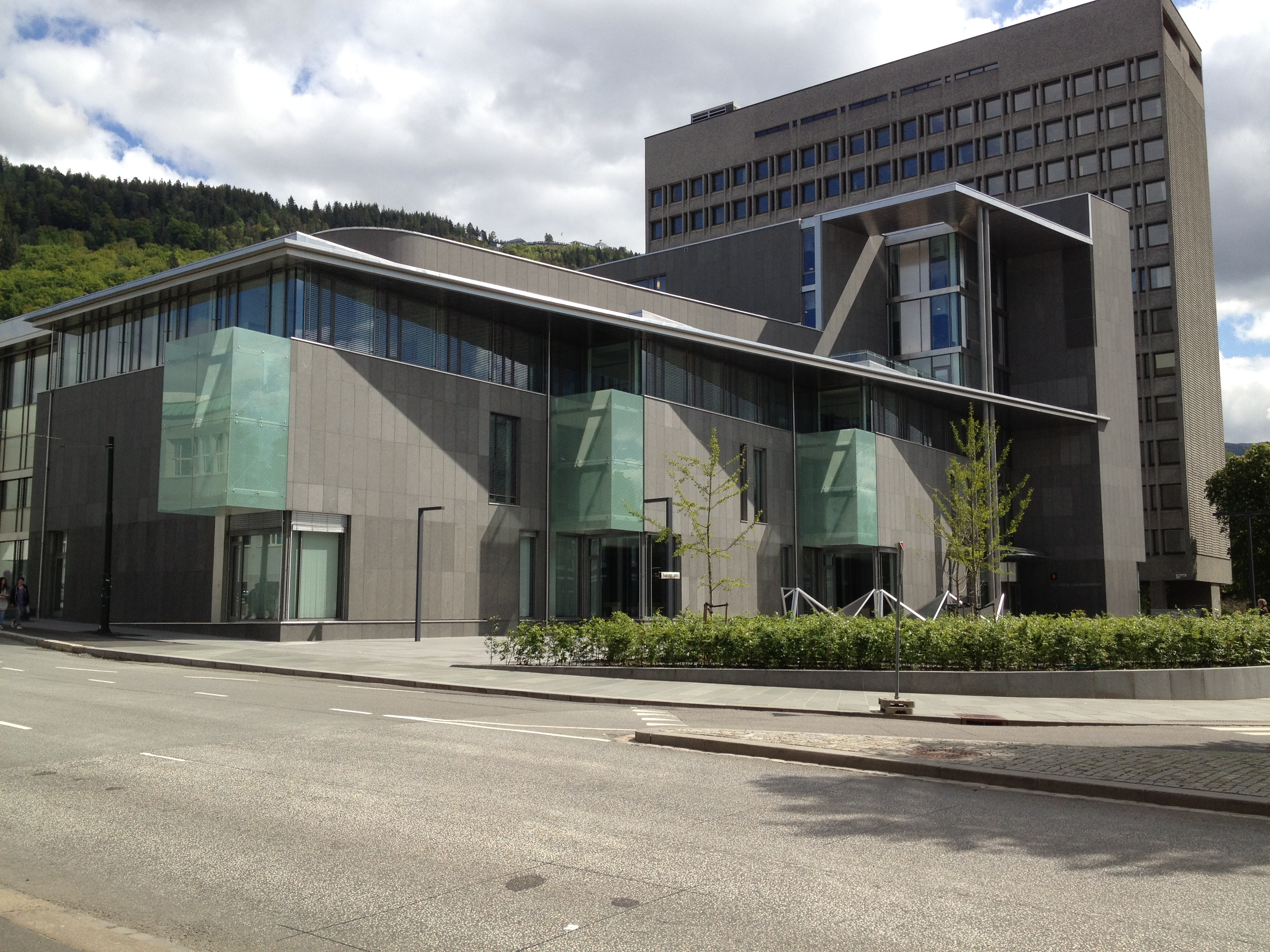
The Gulating Court of Appeal building in Bergen

The country is divided into six appellate districts. Each court of appeal (Norwegian: lagmannsrett) is headed by a senior judge president and each court of appeal has several appellate judges. The courts are:

- Borgarting Court of Appeal in Oslo
- Eidsivating Court of Appeal in Hamar
- Agder Court of Appeal in Skien
- Gulating Court of Appeal in Bergen
- Frostating Court of Appeal in Trondheim
- Hålogaland Court of Appeal in Tromsø

=== District courts ===
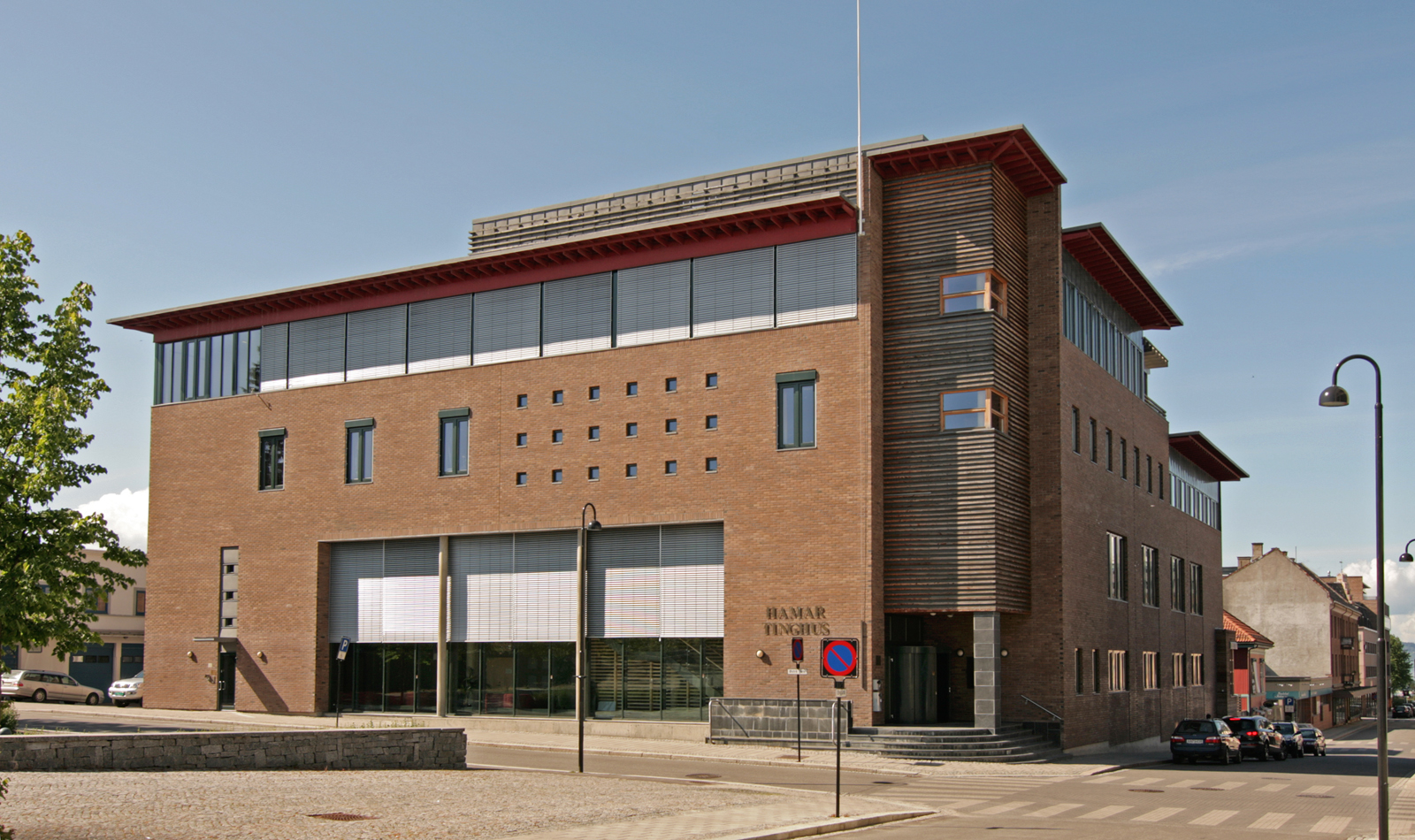
A district court building in Hamar

The district courts (Norwegian: tingrett) are the first instance of the courts of justice. There are 23 district courts.

=== Conciliation boards ===
A conciliation board is allocated to each municipality. Each conciliation board consists of three lay members and an equal number of deputies elected or appointed by the municipal council for terms of four years. Conciliation boards mediate between disputing parties and are generally authorised to pronounce a verdict. Conciliation boards resolve the majority of civil disputes, but they do not hear criminal cases and participation in their hearings is voluntary.

=== Special courts ===
There are special courts that hear or process issues not covered by the District Courts:

- The Industrial Disputes Tribunal: This court deals with cases pertaining to labour legislation, for example wage disputes.
- The Land consolidation courts: Their main task is to find acceptable solutions for ownership disputes and issues concerning correct land usage.

== Law ==
The king has the right in the Council of State to pardon criminals after sentence has been passed. This right is seldom used and always by the elected government in the name of the King.

== Administration ==
The Ministry of Justice and Public Security is the government ministry in charge of justice, police and domestic intelligence.

The Norwegian Courts Administration is the government agency responsible for the management and operations of the courts. It is purely an administrative organisation, and does not interfere with the judicial processes nor the appointment of judges or other judicial positions in the court system.

Norwegian prisons are humane rather than tough with emphasis on rehabilitation. At 20% Norway's reconviction rate is among the lowest in the world.

== Officers ==
=== Judges ===
The Judicial Appointments Board nominates judges for appointment, who are officially appointed by the Council of State.

=== Lay judges ===
In the district courts of Norway, lay judges sit alongside professional judges in mixed courts in most cases. In most cases, two lay judges sit alongside one professional judge. The chairperson may decree that a case have three lay judges sit alongside two professional judges if the workload on that case is high or if there are other compelling reasons. Decisions are made by simple majority.

In the courts of appeal, criminal cases where the maximum penalty is less than six years are tried by a panel consisting of three professional judges and four lay judges.

Lay judges are not considered to be representative of the population. About 75% of lay judges are nominated by the political parties in Norway.

=== Jurors ===
Juries were used from 1887 to 2019.

In the Court of Appeals (Lagmannsrett), ten jurors determined the issue of guilt where a penalty of six years or more could be imposed. In complicated and lengthy cases, the number of jurors could be increased to eleven or twelve in case a juror is unable complete the trial. If there were more than ten jurors after the closing arguments, the number was reduced to ten by dismissing jurors by lot. The jury verdict was not final, and the three professional judges could set aside both convictions and acquittals for a retrial in a court of appeal. Retrials would have three professional judges and four lay judges instead of a jury.

Jurors were selected from the lay judge roster for that court of appeal. The municipalities were responsible for assigning people to the roster.

The last case tried before a jury in Norway was the case against Eirik Jensen. The decision of the jury was set aside by the three judges.

== See also ==
- Incarceration in Norway
- Law of Norway
- Judicial review in Norway
- Høyesterett case concerning the expropriation of land at Kløfta
