= Grev Wedel Jarlsberg v. Marinedepartementet =

- Court: Supreme Court of Norway
- Full case name: Grev Wedel Jarlsberg v. Marinedepartementet
- Decided: 1866 1866
- Citation: Rt. 1866

Outcome
- Establishment of Judicial review in Norway

Questions presented
- Count Wedel Jarlsberg challenged the Ministry of the Navy (Marinedepartementet), arguing that compelling naval officers to perform uncompensated labor for the state was an unconstitutional imposition

Ruling
- Chief Justice Peder Carl Lasson delivered the decisive vote, stating because courts cannot apply two conflicting laws simultaneously, they must necessarily give priority to the Constitution (as lex superior, or supreme law)

Court membership
- Chief Justice of the Supreme Court of Norway: Peder Carl Lasson

Case opinions
- Decision by: Peder Carl Lasson

Grev Wedel Jarlsberg v. Marinedepartementet (Count Wedel Jarlsberg v. Ministry of the Navy) is an 1866 landmark decision by the Supreme Court of Norway that formally established the doctrine of judicial review (Norwegian: prøvingsrett) in Norwegian constitutional law. The case marks the first time the Norwegian Supreme Court explicitly articulated its authority and methodological grounds to invalidate legislation that conflicts with the Constitution of Norway.

Often compared to the United States Supreme Court case Marbury v. Madison, the ruling cemented Norway's position as a pioneer in European constitutionalism, establishing a consistent and lasting praxis of judicial review long before it was formally codified into the Norwegian Constitution.

== Background ==
The Norwegian Constitution, adopted at Eidsvoll on May 17, 1814, established a separation of powers based on Montesquieu's teachings, dividing authority among the executive (the King), the legislative (the Storting), and the judiciary (the Supreme Court). However, the Constitution was entirely silent on whether the judiciary possessed the power to review the constitutionality of laws passed by the Storting.

From the 1820s to the 1850s, the Norwegian Supreme Court had implicitly declined to apply certain statutory provisions deemed to violate constitutional protections, sometimes awarding compensation to private parties. Yet, the Court's reasoning in these early rulings was not made public prior to 1863, and a formal, explicit doctrine of judicial review had not been articulated previously.

== Case Detail ==
The dispute arose over a statutory law that imposed a mandate on naval officers to maintain and continually update crew lists. Crucially, the law required officers to perform this administrative duty without providing any additional compensation.

Count Wedel Jarlsberg challenged the Ministry of the Navy (Marinedepartementet), arguing that compelling naval officers to perform uncompensated labor for the state was an unconstitutional imposition. The case ultimately reached the Supreme Court of Norway, raising the fundamental question of whether the Court had the authority to strike down a legislative act if it found the act to be in violation of the Constitution.

== Judgement ==
In 1866, the Supreme Court ruled in favor of Wedel Jarlsberg. Chief Justice Peder Carl Lasson, serving as the primary architect of the decision, delivered an opinion that unequivocally asserted the Court's power of judicial review.

Lasson argued that when an ordinary statutory law contradicts the Constitution, the Constitution—as the supreme law of the land—must prevail. The Court declared the statutory provision requiring uncompensated labor from naval officers unconstitutional, refusing to apply it. Although Lasson did not directly cite Marbury v. Madison in the text of the judgment, legal historians widely hold that the American precedent heavily inspired his reasoning and the Court's ultimate posture.

== Legacy ==
Grev Wedel Jarlsberg v. Marinedepartementet is widely regarded as the foundational text of Norwegian judicial review.

The legacy of the Wedel Jarlsberg judgment was permanently enshrined in the written Constitution in 2015. That year, the Storting adopted Article 89, which explicitly grants the courts the right and duty to review whether laws and administrative decisions violate the Constitution. During the preparatory works for Article 89, Parliament explicitly acknowledged that the amendment was merely codifying a principle that had been firmly established by the Supreme Court in this 1866 ruling.
