= Incarceration in Norway =

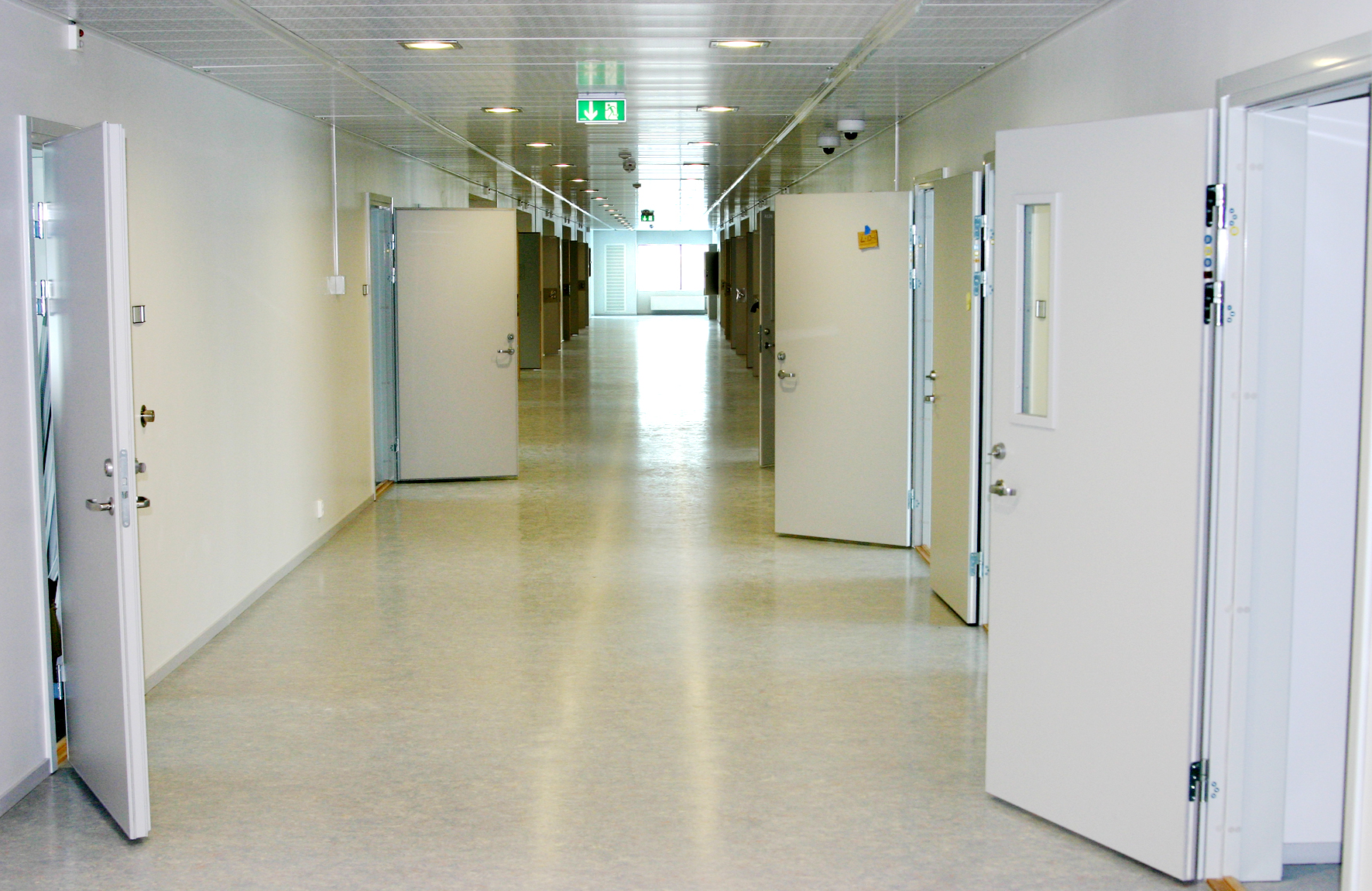
Interior in Halden prison

Incarceration in Norway is one of the primary forms of punishment and rehabilitation for individuals convicted of criminal offenses.

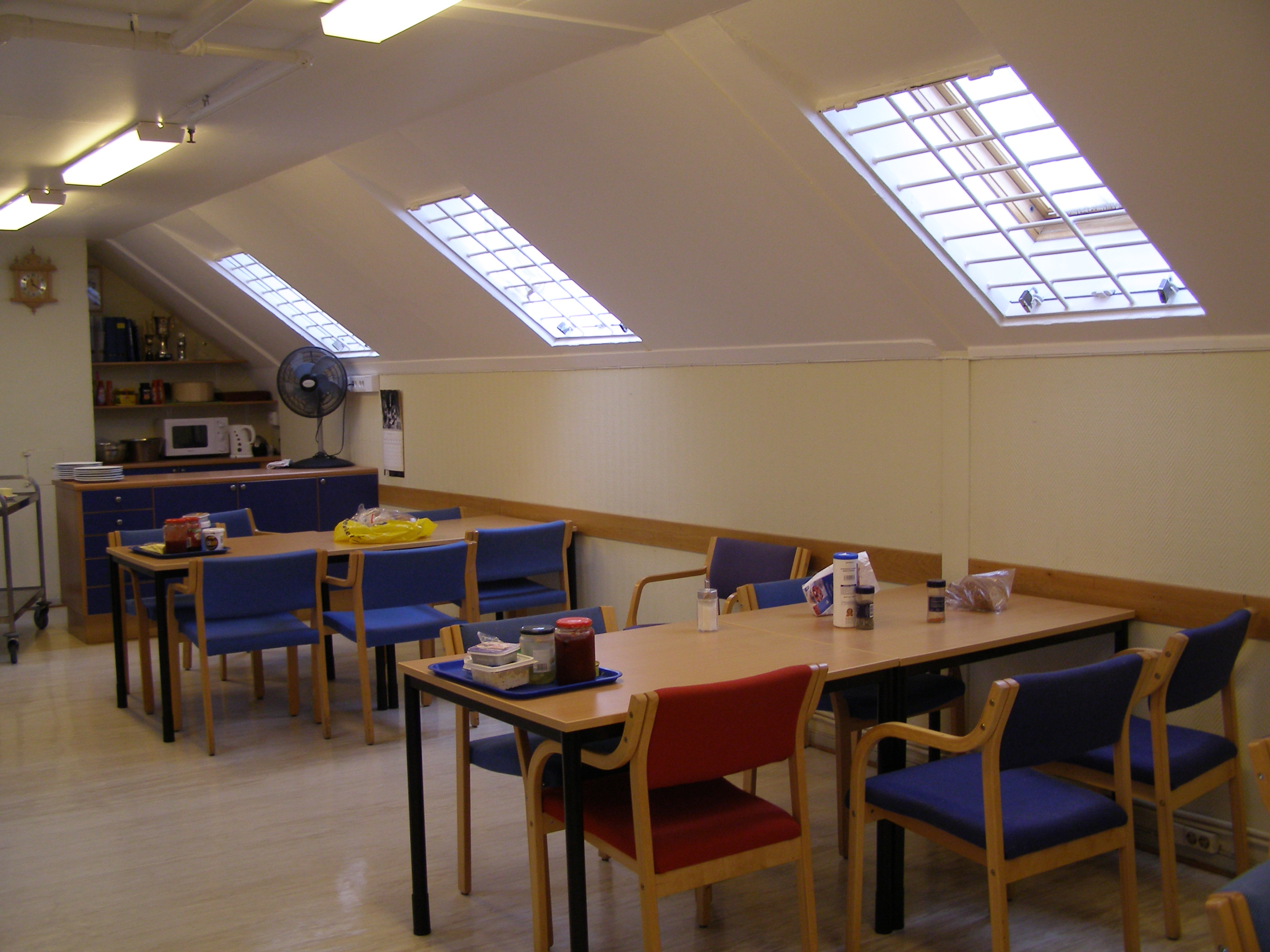
Interior in Larvik prison

Norway's criminal justice system is organized around the principles of restorative justice, rehabilitation, and the normalization of daily life in prison. Correctional facilities in Norway focus on maintaining secure custody while supporting the social reintegration of offenders, following the idea that life inside prison should resemble life outside as closely as possible within safety limits.

Per capita, Norway has one of the lowest recidivism rates globally; in 2018, the reconviction rate was 18 percent within two years of release and 25 percent after five years. Per capita, the country also reports relatively low overall crime rates. Norway's prison system houses approximately 3,000 individuals at any given time.

Norwegian law prohibits the use of torture and other cruel, inhuman, or degrading treatment as punishment. Prison conditions generally meet international human rights standards, and independent organizations regularly monitor facilities. Prisoners also have access to an ombudsman who can investigate complaints about public authorities.

Norway does not use capital punishment or traditional life imprisonment. The maximum custodial sentence is 21 years (30 years for crimes against humanity, with life imprisonment applicable only under military law). Courts may extend an offender's sentence in renewable five-year increments if the individual is judged to remain a significant risk to society.

== History ==
Before Norway adopted its modern rehabilitative model, the country operated a largely punitive justice system. Public dissatisfaction with these harsh conditions grew during the 1960s, and in 1968, the Norwegian Association for Criminal Reform (KROM) was formed to advocate for change. At the time, the system relied heavily on a medical-treatment approach in which incarceration length was determined by perceived therapeutic success.

KROM's first major reform occurred in 1970 with the abolition of forced labor, followed by the closure of juvenile delinquency centers in 1975. These changes aligned with broader shifts in Nordic penal policy that emphasized social integration and the principle of normalization, which holds that life inside prison should resemble life outside as much as security allows. By the 1980s, however, punitive practices were still common, and recidivism remained high at approximately 60 to 70 percent.

In the early 1990s, Norway adopted reforms that placed stronger emphasis on rehabilitation and normalized prison conditions. Juvenile justice reforms during this period also reflected a shift toward education, welfare support, and community-based alternatives.

== Prison system ==
=== Penalties in society ===
Norway's criminal justice protocol is sometimes referred to as the “Norwegian model”, though official terminology distinguishes between "penalties in society" and "penalties in prison." "Penalties in society allow an offender to serve part or all of their sentence outside a custodial setting while meeting regularly with correctional officials. Individuals may continue employment, live with their families, and maintain daily routines so long as they comply with court-ordered conditions.

Community service is the most common non-custodial penalty. It is measured in hours rather than days or months, with most sentences ranging from 30 to 70 hours, typically completed within one year. Community service may involve work in schools, churches, kindergartens, and social organizations. Additional programs—such as behavioral-change courses, substance-use treatment, or counseling—may be added as conditions of the implementation plan.

Electronic monitoring is widely used in the final months of a sentence, allowing qualified individuals to serve part of their term at home while wearing an ankle-monitoring device. Anti-doping programs and drug treatment with judicial review serve as alternatives to imprisonment for offenders convicted of substance-related crimes.

=== Penalty in prison ===
As of 2018, Norway operated 43 prisons, including five female-only facilities. All institutions use the import model, meaning incarcerated individuals receive services such as health care, education, and library access from the same public agencies that serve the general population.

Norway does not impose capital punishment or ordinary life imprisonment. The maximum fixed-term prison sentence is generally 21 years, though the penal code allows for a 30-year maximum for crimes such as genocide and war crimes. Preventive detention (forvaring) may be repeatedly extended by up to five years at a time if a court determines that the individual continues to pose a serious risk of reoffending, potentially resulting in lifelong detention. According to the Norwegian Correctional Service, the average prison sentence is approximately eight months.

In keeping with the principle of normalization, the purpose of imprisonment is limited to the restriction of liberty; other civil rights, including voting rights, are retained. Prison authorities attempt to place individuals in the lowest security level appropriate to their risk and needs. Progression toward release commonly involves movement from high-security to low-security facilities, followed by transitional housing.

While not engaged in work, education, or recreation, inmates spend time in their units or under supervision of correctional officers. Cells are searched daily, and inmates may possess only limited personal items.

Norway maintains three levels of custody: high security (closed prisons), low security (open prisons), and transitional housing. Approximately 60 percent of Norwegian prisons are closed facilities with external fences and secured perimeters. Open prisons restrict movement only at night and encourage structured contact with the community, while transitional housing provides gradual reintegration through supported living arrangements and work or training opportunities.

=== Prison officers ===
Prison staff in Norway are referred to as officers rather than guards, reflecting their rehabilitative role. Officers often describe themselves as mentors or role models, and training emphasizes communication, ethics, social work, and reintegration. Candidates complete a two-year program in correctional studies followed by one year of practical service.

== Prison population ==
According to the World Prison Brief, Norway held 2,932 individuals across 58 institutions in 2020. Of these, 26 percent were held in remand custody, approximately 0.1 percent were juveniles, and about 6 percent were women. Roughly one-quarter of the incarcerated population was foreign-born.

Norwegian prisons operate below their official capacity of 4,092 people. The population grew between 2000 and 2016—from about 2,500 to 3,850—and then declined to 2,932 by 2020, corresponding to a rate of 54 prisoners per 100,000 residents.

== Problems ==
In 2018, the United Nations Committee against Torture criticised the "high rates of prolonged isolation" of prisoners in Norway, of which it stated, "amounts to solitary confinement". The World Health Organization (WHO) has also criticised the fact that the rate of suicide in Norwegian prisons is one of the highest in Europe.

== See also ==
- Norwegian Correctional Service
