= Ullensaker Church =

- Ullensaker kirke
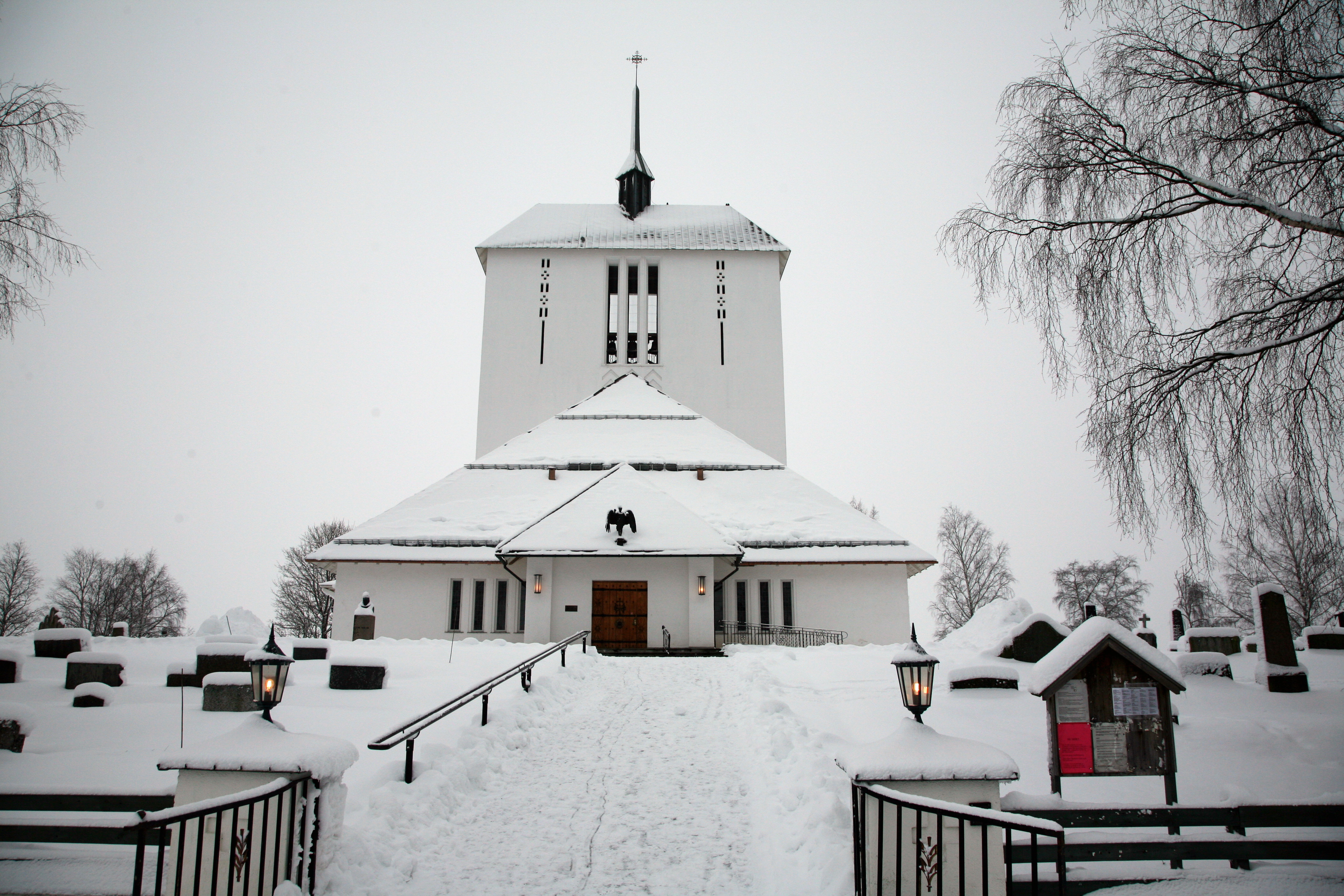

- Location of the church Ullensaker Church (Norway)
- 60.0837°N 11.1647°E
- Location: Kløfta, Ullensaker
- Country: Norway
- Denomination: Church of Norway
- Churchmanship: Evangelical Lutheran
- Website: kirken.no/ullensaker

History
- Former name(s): St John the Baptist's Church; St Olav's Church
- Status: Parish church
- Consecrated: 1958

Architecture
- Functional status: Active
- Architect(s): Arnstein Arneberg; Per Solemslie

Specifications
- Materials: Concrete

Administration
- Diocese: Diocese of Borg
- Deanery: Øvre Romerike
- Parish: Ullensaker

Ullensaker Church is a church in Ullensaker, Norway, located 10 km (6.21 mi) southeast of Oslo Airport, Gardermoen. It is the fourth church that has been located almost there since the 12th century. The present church was built in concrete in 1958 and has been given the nickname "Romeriksdomen" ("The Romerike Cathedral") locally because of its monumental character.

== History ==
The first church, from c. 1190, was a stone church that was located about 200 meters further northeast. It was established at the prestigious Ullinshof, a pre-Christian cult center. Most of this church was taken by a clay landslide c. 1490, but four doors and some other fixtures in the doorway were preserved.

In c. 1525 a simple stave church was built at the present church site. It seems that the name of the cemetery was changed to Ullensaker Cemetery on that occasion. The stave church was c. 1640 extended to a cruciform church.

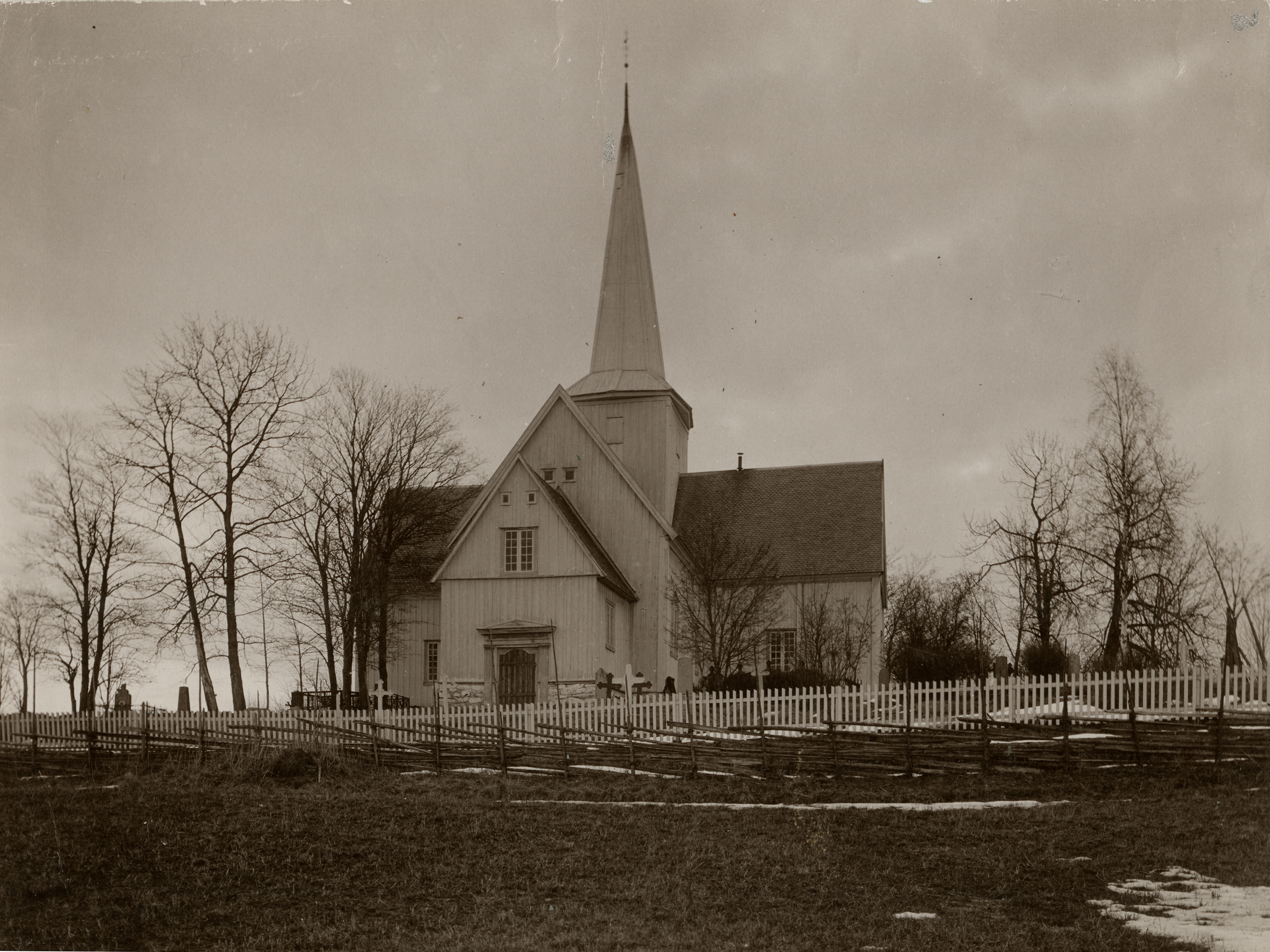
The former church from 1768 was hit by lightning and caught fire in 1952 Image: The Norwegian Directorate for Cultural Heritage

In 1768 the stave church was demolished and replaced by another wooden church, a white-painted church of timber. This church was struck by lightning and burned to the ground in 1952, but much of the valuable fixtures of the former churches were rescued.

The current church was consecrated on October 12, 1958.

== Interior ==
The visitors are welcomed by a statue of Archangel Michael over the entrance, created by Ragnhild Butenschøn. Most of the decorations in the church room are created by artist Alf Rolfsen. The altarpiece, the pulpit and the baptismal font are from the former church that burned in 1952. The altarpiece was created by the wood carver Johan Reinholt in Oslo in 1633. It has several fields that illustrate different evangelical sites, with the communion in the great central field. The pulpit is in Renaissance style and has five fields depicting The Evangelists and Jesus Christ. The baptismal font of soapstone was created in Gudbrandsdalen in the mid 12th century.

The church has two church bells in the bell tower that were made by Olsen Nauen Bell Foundry, in addition to a preserved medieval church bell that can be found in the porch.

The Ullensaker church site is listed and protected by the Norwegian Directorate for Cultural Heritage.
