= Høyesterett case concerning the expropriation of land at Kløfta =

Kløfta-dommen
- Court: Supreme Court of Norway
- Decided: 1976 1976
- Citation: Rt. 1976 s. 1

Questions presented
- Did the valuation methods in the 1973 Expropriation Compensation Act violate the constitutional guarantee of full compensation?

Holding
- Yes. The 1973 Act failed to provide constitutional "full compensation" and was set aside. Furthermore, the Supreme Court explicitly reaffirmed its power of judicial review over parliamentary statutes.

Area of law
- Constitutional law, Property law, Expropriation

The 1976 Kløfta Case (Norwegian: Kløfta-dommen, officially cited in the Norwegian Law Gazette as Rt. 1976 s. 1) is one of the most significant landmark decisions in the history of the Supreme Court of Norway (Høyesterett). The case centered on the constitutional right to "full compensation" during property expropriation.

Beyond its immediate impact on property rights, the judgment is historically celebrated for resurrecting and cementing the power of judicial review (prøvingsrett) in Norway, ending decades of judicial deference to the national legislature (Stortinget).

== Background ==
In 1973, the Norwegian parliament passed the Expropriation Compensation Act. Driven by a social democratic political agenda, the legislation aimed to make public land acquisition less expensive by changing how property was valued. The new law dictated that compensation for expropriated land should be based strictly on its "current use value" rather than its potential development or market sales value.

Shortly after the law's passage, a landowner in Kløfta (a village in Ullensaker municipality) had his property expropriated by the state. The compensation offered under the new 1973 law was significantly lower than the market value of the land. The landowner challenged the compensation in court, arguing that the 1973 Act violated Section 105 of the Norwegian Constitution, which guarantees that anyone forced to surrender their property for public use must receive "full compensation."

== The Supreme Court Ruling ==
Because the case challenged the constitutionality of a formal statute passed by Parliament, the Supreme Court heard the case in a plenary session (plenumsdom), meaning all sitting justices participated.

By a narrow majority, the Supreme Court ruled in favor of the landowner. The Court found that the specific compensation calculation methods prescribed by the 1973 Act failed to meet the constitutional threshold of "full compensation" and set the statute aside in this specific instance.

== Standard of Review Doctrine ==
While striking down the law was monumental, the lasting legal legacy of the Kløfta Case stems from the framework the Court established to justify its decision. The First-Voting Justice articulated a new standard for how intensively the courts should review legislation against the Constitution, known as the Standard of Review Doctrine. The doctrine divided constitutional provisions into three categories, each triggering a different level of judicial scrutiny:

=== Personal Liberty and Security ===
When evaluating laws that potentially infringe on fundamental human rights (such as freedom of speech or due process), the Court exercises strict scrutiny and will aggressively defend the Constitution against legislative overreach.

=== Mechanics of Government ===
When reviewing laws regulating the separation of powers or the internal workings of the state, the Court exercises moderate scrutiny

=== Economic Rights ===
When reviewing laws regulating economic rights (such as Section 105 on expropriation or Section 97 on retroactive taxation), the Court exercises restrained scrutiny. The Court stated it must give considerable weight to Parliament's interpretation of the Constitution. A law regulating economic rights should only be struck down if its unconstitutionality is "beyond a reasonable doubt."

Despite applying the most restrained level of scrutiny to the Kløfta property dispute, the Court still found that the 1973 Act's compensation rules were unconstitutional beyond a reasonable doubt.

== Significance and Legacy ==
Before 1976, the Norwegian Supreme Court had not struck down a parliamentary statute for decades. Following a major political backlash against the Court in the 1920s and 1930s (the so-called "Waterfall cases"), the judiciary had adopted a posture of extreme deference to the legislature. Leading legal scholars of the era, such as Torstein Eckhoff, had recently published works declaring that judicial review in Norway was practically a dead letter.

The Kløfta Case proved them wrong. It shocked the political and legal establishment by proving that the Supreme Court was still willing to act as a guardian of the Constitution. The ruling established judicial review as "secure constitutional customary law" (sikker konstitusjonell sedvanerett).

The principles laid down in the Kløfta Case guided Norwegian constitutional law for decades. In 2015, the customary practice of judicial review resurrected at Kløfta was formally codified into the written text of the Norwegian Constitution under Section 89.
