= 1918 Waterfall Case (Norway) =

Norwegian constitutional decision

Konsesjonslovdommen av 1918
- Court: Supreme Court of Norway
- Decided: 1918
- Citation: Rt. 1918 s. 400

Outcome
- Legacy Established state sovereignty over natural resources; foundational precedent for the later regulation of Norway's North Sea oil and gas reserves.

Questions presented
- Did the right of reversion (hjemfallsrett) without compensation under the Industrial Concession Act of 1909 violate Section 105 of the Norwegian Constitution (protection against uncompensated expropriation)?

Holding
- The Act is constitutional. The reversion of property is a voluntary condition attached to the granting of a concession, not a forced expropriation. Therefore, Section 105 does not apply.

Case opinions
- Majority: 4
- Dissent: 3

Laws applied
- Constitution of Norway (Section 105); Industrial Concession Act of 1909

Area of law
- Constitutional law, Property law, Natural resource management

The 1918 Waterfall Case (Norwegian: Konsesjonslovdommen av 1918) was a landmark constitutional decision by the Supreme Court of Norway that upheld the legality of the Industrial Concession Act of 1909. The case centered on the controversial legal principle of hjemfallsrett (right of reversion), which mandated that privately developed hydroelectric power plants and their associated waterfalls would revert to state ownership without compensation after a set concession period.

Plaintiffs argued that this mechanism violated Section 105 of the Norwegian Constitution, which protects against expropriation without full compensation. In a narrow 4–3 decision, the Supreme Court ruled in favor of the state, establishing a foundational precedent for Norwegian natural resource management, resource nationalism, and the scope of judicial review.

== Background ==
At the turn of the 20th century, Norway experienced rapid industrialization driven by the development of hydroelectric power, often referred to at the time as "white coal." The country's mountainous topography and abundant watercourses made it an ideal location for energy-intensive industries. However, there was a severe lack of domestic capital available for these massive infrastructure projects. As a result, by 1906, over three-quarters of Norway's developed waterfalls had been purchased by foreign investors and multinational corporations.

Fearing that Norway would lose sovereignty over its own natural resources and that citizens would become "hired hands" in their own country shortly after gaining independence from Sweden in 1905, the Norwegian Parliament (Stortinget) passed the provisional "Panic Law" in 1906. This was followed by more comprehensive and permanent legislation, spearheaded by politicians like Prime Minister Gunnar Knudsen and Johan Castberg, culminating in the Industrial Concession Act of 1909.

== The Industrial Concession Act of 1909 ==
The core mechanism of the 1909 Act was the concession system. Any foreign entity or private corporation wishing to acquire and develop Norwegian waterfalls had to obtain a concession (a license or permission) from the Norwegian government.

The most heavily debated provision of these concessions was the hjemfallsrett (right of reversion). The law stipulated the following terms:

- Concessions would be granted for a strictly limited period, generally between 60 and 90 years.
- Upon the expiration of this period, full ownership of the waterfall, along with all appurtenant dams, power stations, and infrastructure, would automatically revert to the Norwegian State.
- This reversion would occur without any financial compensation to the private developers.

== The Supreme Court Case ==
The imposition of the right of reversion triggered fierce legal and political debate. Opponents, primarily private developers, foreign investors, and conservative political factions, argued that the hjemfallsrett was a profound overreach of state power.

In 1918, a lawsuit challenging the constitutionality of the 1909 Act reached the Supreme Court of Norway. The plaintiffs argued that the reversion of infrastructure and property to the state without payment constituted a direct violation of Section 105 of the Constitution of Norway. This section explicitly states that anyone forced to surrender their movable or immovable property for public use must receive full compensation from the state treasury.

== The Ruling ==
In 1918, the Supreme Court issued its ruling, deciding the case with a narrow 4–3 majority in favor of the government and upholding the Concession Act.

The Court ruled that the state was not expropriating existing, unconditionally owned property. Instead, the state was setting prospective conditions for the acquisition of national resources. Because developers voluntarily agreed to the concession terms when purchasing the water rights, the eventual reversion was simply the contractual expiration of a time-limited right, not a forced expropriation.

The majority emphasized that Parliament possessed broad discretion to regulate property rights in order to balance individual ownership with societal interests and national economic development. Section 105 was interpreted as strictly applying to actual, forced expropriation, not to broad economic and public interest regulations.

== Legacy ==
The ruling secured the legal foundation for the Norwegian model of "power communalism" and resource nationalism. By affirming the state's ultimate sovereignty over natural resources, the case ensured that the immense wealth generated by hydropower benefited the Norwegian public. Decades later in the 1960s, Norwegian bureaucrats used this exact legal framework and concession model to regulate the newly discovered petroleum sector in the North Sea, forming the economic bedrock of the modern Norwegian welfare state.

The case was one of the first explicit, highly public exercises of judicial review by the Norwegian Supreme Court. While the Court ultimately exercised judicial restraint by deferring to the legislature's economic regulations, the fact that they actively tested the law against the Constitution—and split so narrowly—sparked massive political debate. It firmly entrenched the Court's authority to evaluate the constitutionality of parliamentary laws.
