= Kløfta =

- Town
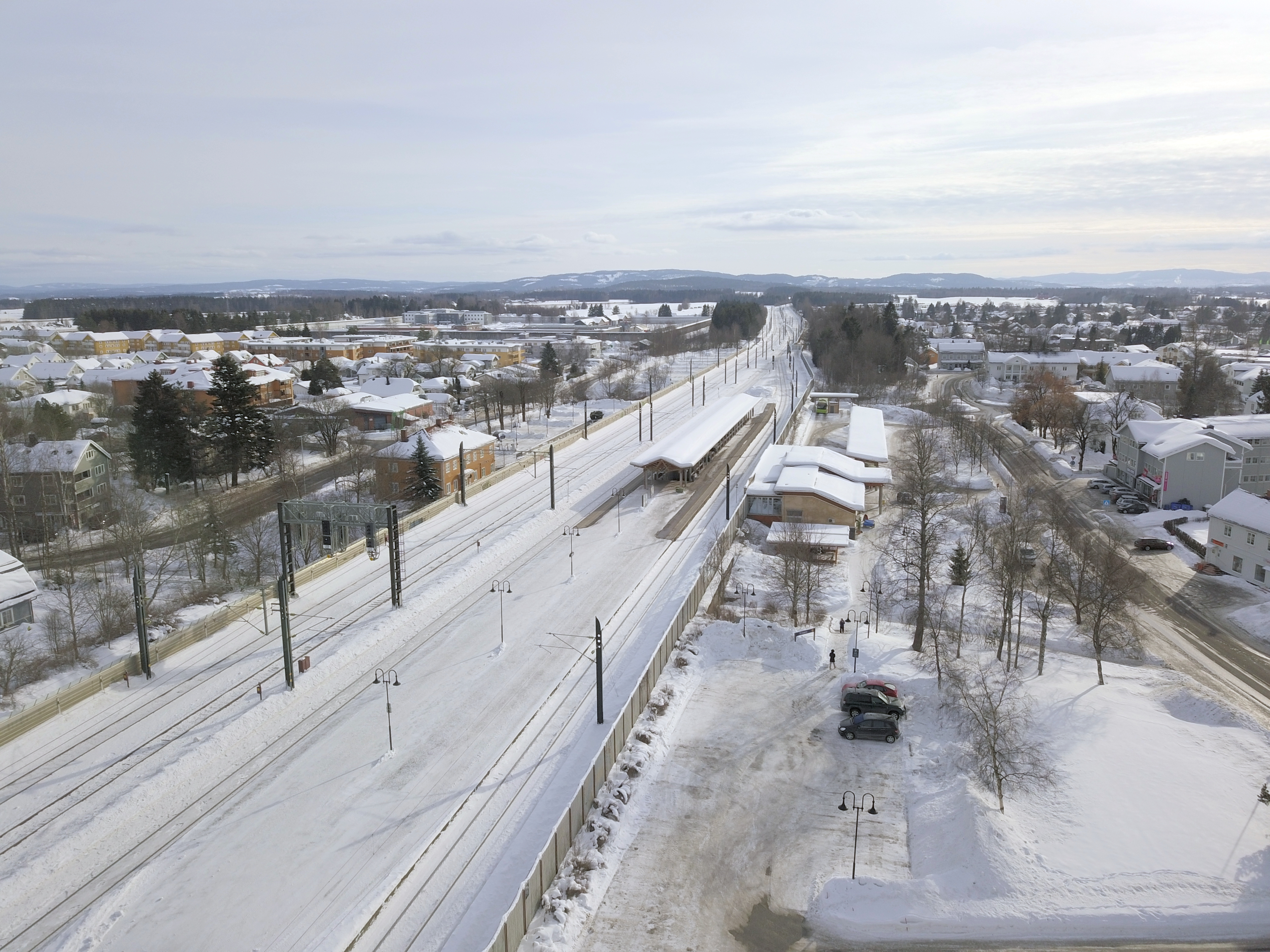
- Kløfta with Kløfta Station in the foreground and Ullersmo Prison in the background.

- Location within Norway
- Coordinates: 60°4′37.2″N 11°8′20″E
- Country: Norway
- County: Akershus
- Municipality: Ullensaker
- District: Romerike

Population (2023)
  - Total: 8,371
- Time zone: UTC+1 (CET)
  - Summer (DST): UTC+2 (CEST)
- Post code: 2040 Kløfta

Kløfta is a village located in Ullensaker, Akershus, Norway. It has a population of 8,371 inhabitants as of December 12th, 2023.

Kløfta has local sports club, Kløfta IL with teams for football, handball, basketball, e-sports, table tennis, cycling and floorball. A large sports and activity park was built and completed in Bakkedalen in 2019. There is a local shopping mall, Romerikssenteret in Kløfta. Kløfta has three schools – a middle school and two first through seventh grade school, as well as several kindergartens.

== Background ==
Literally translated, the name means 'the cleft' in English. It probably refers to a junction of three roads heading for Oslo, Trondheim and Kongsvinger. At Kløfta, the road RV2 towards Sweden branches off from the E6. Two railway lines to the north also split here.

Norway's main prison, Ullersmo prison, is located in Kløfta. It is also home to some of the largest farming equipment companies in Norway. Ullensaker Church, built in 1958, lies just outside Kløfta. This church is often referred to as the "Romerike cathedral".

Augustus Halvorsen Hilton (1854–1919), the father of American hotelier Conrad Hilton and emigrant to the United States, was born in Kløfta.

Kløfta was, until 1995, the location of a longwave broadcasting station, which broadcast on 216 kHz.

== Gallery ==
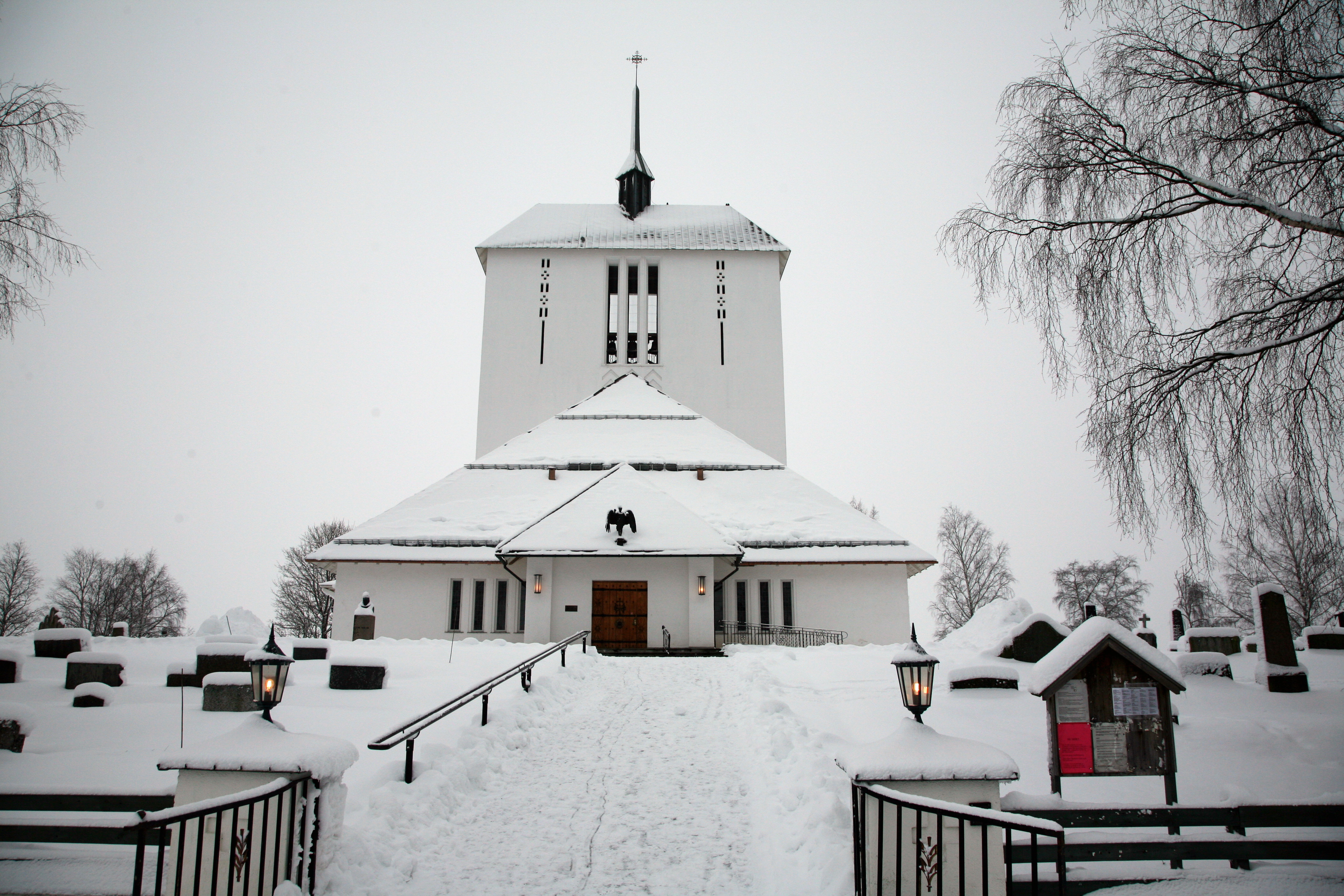
Ullensaker Church is a large church at Kløfta, often referred to as "Romeriksdomen" or Romerike "Cathedral"
