= Customary constitution =

Constitution established by custom

Customary constitution or constitutional customary law is the part of the constitution that corresponds to unwritten customary law. Therefore, depending on the view regarding the legal validity of the constitution established as customary law, customary constitution can be regarded as a constitutional law with binding force existing prior and above the written constitution, or as a non-binding constitutional convention emerged after and thus considered inferior to written constitution.

Early discussions on customary constitution are primarily found in history of France. For example, under the French constitutional laws of 1875, due to high political pressure, president Jules Grévy had to give up his constitutional power to dissolve parliament, and later presidents followed it. Another example is constitutional amendments under the French Fifth Republic. In 1962, president Charles de Gaulle detoured ordinary procedure for constitutional amendment in written constitution (article 89), by using constitutional referendum (article 11), and this anomalous procedure was never legally rejected later. This is explicit example in French legal history showing that customary constitution (French: coutumes constitutionnelles) can have same level of legal validity as written constitution.

Clear contemporary example of customary constitution comes from South Korea. In 2004, the Constitutional Court of Korea found changing national capital city from Seoul to Sejong City, by ordinary sub-constitutional legislation, was unconstitutional, because location of the Seoul as national capital city was unwritten customary constitution (Korean: 관습헌법; Hanja: 慣習憲法; RR: Gwanseup Heonbeop) of South Korea at that time. According to the Constitutional Court decision 2004Hun-Ma554, such customary constitution was enforceable by the Constitutional Court, and changing it required at least a national referendum.

== See also ==
- Convention (political norm)
- Customary law
- Uncodified constitution
