= Isaachsen =

Isaachsen is a surname. Notable people with the surname include:

- Daniel Isaachsen (physicist) (1859–1940), Norwegian physicist
- Daniel Otto Isaachsen (1806–1891), Norwegian businessman and politician
- Isaach Isaachsen (1774–1828), Norwegian politician
- Olaf Isaachsen (1835–1893), Norwegian painter
