= Willoch =

Willoch is a surname. Notable people with the surname include:

- Kåre Willoch (born 1928), Norwegian politician
- Odd Isaachsen Willoch (1885–1940), Norwegian naval officer
- Herman Willoch, Norwegian painter
- Erik Willoch, Norwegian jurist
- Sigurd Willoch, Norwegian art historian
