= Daniel Isaachsen =

Daniel Isaachsen may refer to:

- Daniel Isaachsen (physicist) (1859–1940), Norwegian physicist
- Daniel Otto Isaachsen (1806–1891), Norwegian businessman and politician
