= Sandefjord Airport, Torp =

Airport in Norway

Sandefjord Airport, Torp Sandefjord lufthavn, Torp
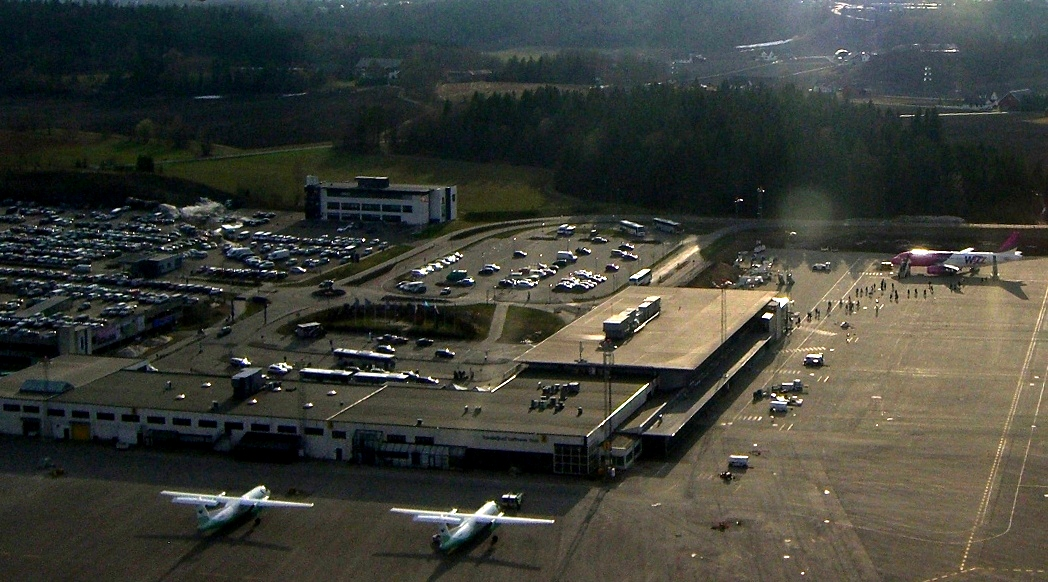
- IATA: TRF; ICAO: ENTO

Summary
- Airport type: Public
- Owner: Sandefjord Municipality (43,26%); Vestfold County Municipality (43,26%); Vestfold Flyplassinvest AS (13,48%)
- Operator: Sandefjord Lufthavn AS
- Serves: Vestfold; Greater Oslo Region; Eastern Norway
- Operating base for: Widerøe
- Elevation AMSL: 87 m (285 ft)
- Coordinates: 59°11′12″N 010°15′31″E
- Website: www.torp.no

Map
- Location within Norway

Runways
Direction	Length		Surface
Direction	m	ft	Surface
18/36	2,989	9,806	Asphalt

Statistics (2017)
- Passengers: 1,963,000
- Aircraft movements: 42,139
- Cargo (tonnes): 23
- Source: Norwegian AIP at Avinor; Statistics from Avinor

Sandefjord Airport, Torp (Norwegian: Sandefjord lufthavn, Torp; IATA: TRF, ICAO: ENTO) is a minor international airport located 4 nautical miles (7.4 km; 4.6 mi) northeast of Sandefjord and 110 kilometers (68 mi) south of Oslo in Norway. The airport features a 2,989-meter (9,806 ft) runway aligned 18/36. Torp partially serves as a regional airport for Vestfold and in part as a low-cost airport for Eastern Norway and the capital, Oslo. Widerøe have a base at Torp, serving both domestic and shorter international flights. It also sees scheduled flights by airBaltic, Ryanair, Wizz Air, Scandinavian Airlines, and Norwegian Air Shuttle. As of 2021, it was the second-largest airport in eastern Norway in terms of flights after Rygge shut down in 2016.

The airport was built largely with NATO funding as one of several bases to be used by the United States Air Force in case of war. Construction started in 1953 and the airport was opened on 2 July 1956. By then, the military interest in the airport had dwindled. Civilian flights commenced in 1958, and in 1960, a municipal airport company was established to run a civilian sector. Vestfoldfly started operations the following year, and through a series of name changes and acquisitions has become the basis for Widerøe's operations at Torp. International services commenced in 1985 and Mediterranean charter services in 1992. The airport expanded in the 1960s and in 1997 became a Ryanair destination, which marketed it as an airport serving Oslo as Oslo Torp and Oslo South. The airport markets itself as TORP Sandefjord Airport (Norwegian: TORP Sandefjord lufthavn).

The main entry road from European route E18 traverses the beech tree forests of Fokserød Nature Preserve.

== History ==
=== Establishment ===
Following the end of the Second World War and Norway's subsequent membership in NATO, it became strategically important to build several new air stations in the country. This was based on a United States analysis from 1951, carried out by General Robert K. Taylor, which intended to station three wings, each of 75 aircraft, in Denmark and Norway. Each wing would have about 3,000 permanently stationed American personnel. Norwegian policy prohibited permanent stationing of foreign military personnel on Norwegian soil, but allowed the United States to build air stations that would be suitable for refueling before attacking targets within Eastern Europe. There were two main strategies that NATO intended to use that would require a new military air station in Southern Norway. The first was the "polar strategy", which involved NATO aircraft flying nuclear weapons into the Soviet Union. This would require refueling stations in Norway, but only about twenty permanently stationed personnel. The second was to station aircraft to allow a flanking maneuver if Soviet troops were to attack Central Europe.

Negotiations among NATO, the United States and Norway were initiated on 27 March 1951. The United States wanted to own and operate the air stations themselves, and use the stations for preemptive strikes towards the Soviet Union. At the time, air stations were available for use at Sola, Gardermoen, Lista and Ørland, but more capacity would be needed. On 24 November, the United States proposed converting Tønsberg Airport, Jarlsberg into an air force station. NATO dedicated NOK 48 million to rebuild the airport. The issue was discussed by Parliament on 4 March 1952 along with several other proposals to build air stations or expand airports to meet NATO's needs, namely Gardermoen, Jarlsberg, Lista, Ørland, Bardufoss and Rygge. The legislature approved funding the program with NOK 92 million of the total NOK 277.6 million budget. In May 1952, Prime Minister Oscar Torp informed United States General Dwight D. Eisenhower that he intended to try to convince Parliament to change the Norwegian base policies to allow permanent stationing of foreign troops. This was not successful, and Parliament would not change the policy. Instead, the politicians hoped the American fighters based in Denmark would defend Norway.

Closer investigations of Jarlsberg showed that the airport was not suitable for expansion. The airport had been expanded in 1950, receiving a 1,200-meter (3,900 ft) runway. An air station for Republic F-84 Thunderjet fighter jets would require a 3,000-meter (9,800 ft) runway, and due to surrounding hills this was not possible at Jarlsberg. Instead, the military looked at Langåker and Torp as possible locations. However, the military did note that Jarlsberg would be easier to defend, but that the defensibility was correlated to the rugged terrain that made expansion difficult. Torp was also preferred due to its close proximity to the European Route E18, and the Vestfold Line and Råstad Station. The choice of location was approved by NATO on 6 September 1952, and by the Cabinet of Norway on 12 September. It was unanimously passed by Parliament on 18 October, with only Torgeir Andreas Berge speaking up against the location. Berge, who lived within the approach area of the airport, was concerned about noise pollution affecting the local population.

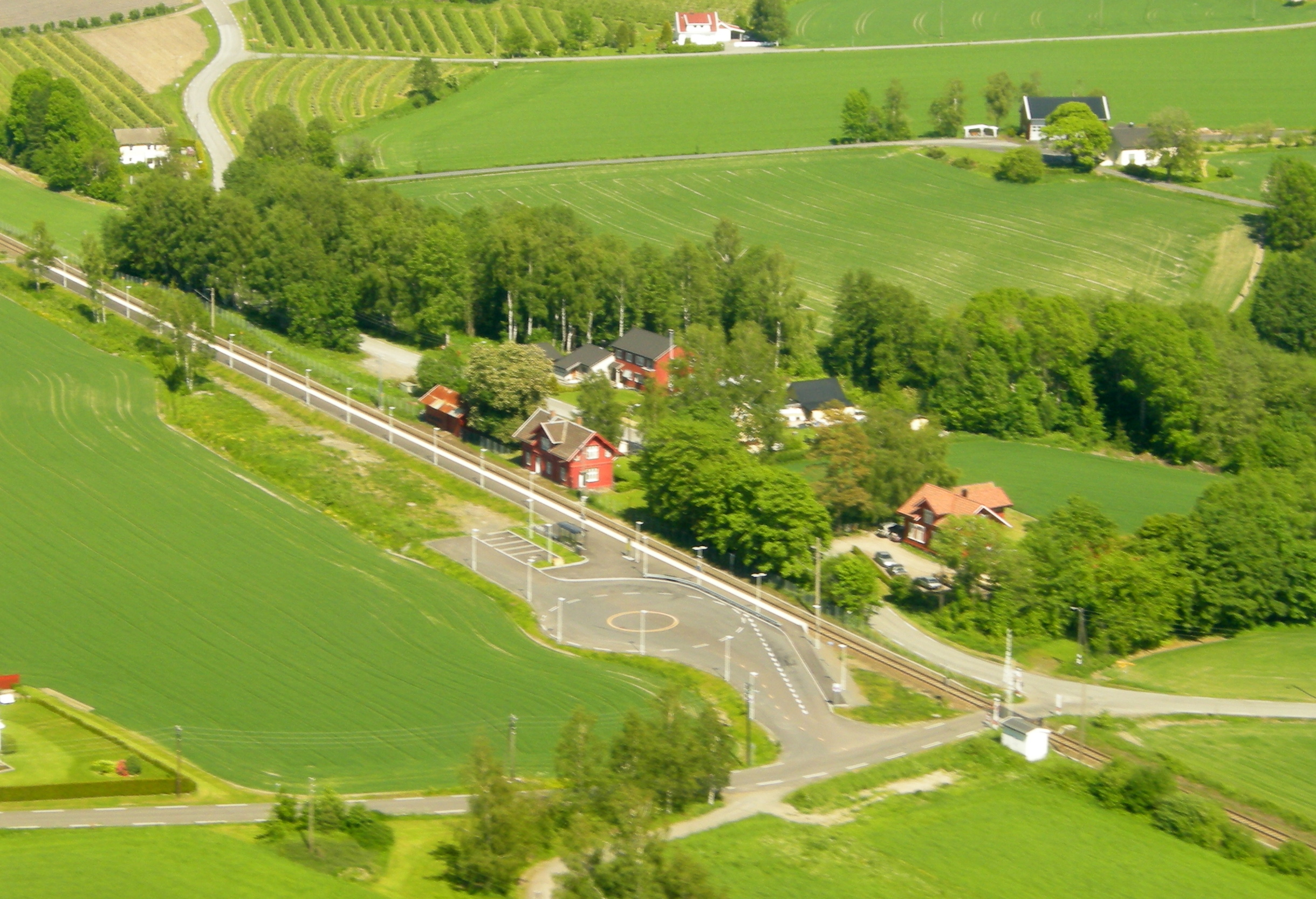
Torp was in part chosen due to its proximity to Raastad Station on the Vestfold Line

The government expropriated the necessary land in February 1953. This covered 4.0 square kilometers (1.5 sq mi), of which 3.5 km^{2} (1.4 sq mi) was forest, 0.25 km^{2} (0.097 sq mi) was fields and 0.25 km^{2} (0.097 sq mi) was pasture. About half the area was in Stokke Municipality and the rest in the former Sandar Municipality. Thirty-seven land-owners were affected, receiving a combined compensation NOK 3.75 million. The builder was the Norwegian Defence Estates Agency and the main contractor was Astrup & Aubert. Other major contractors were Lo-Wi-Co, who did most of the explosives, and Byggmester Thor Kandal jr., who built the buildings. A pumping station for fuel was built at the shore at Bogen, and a pipeline built to the air station. The fuel was transported to Bogen with small tank ships from Vølle and later Slagentangen. This system was built by the United States, and was in use until 1993. The runway and taxiway were built in concrete. Up to twenty people worked on the construction at any time. The official opening occurred on 2 July 1956, when two F-84s landed at 11:00.

=== First civilian operation ===
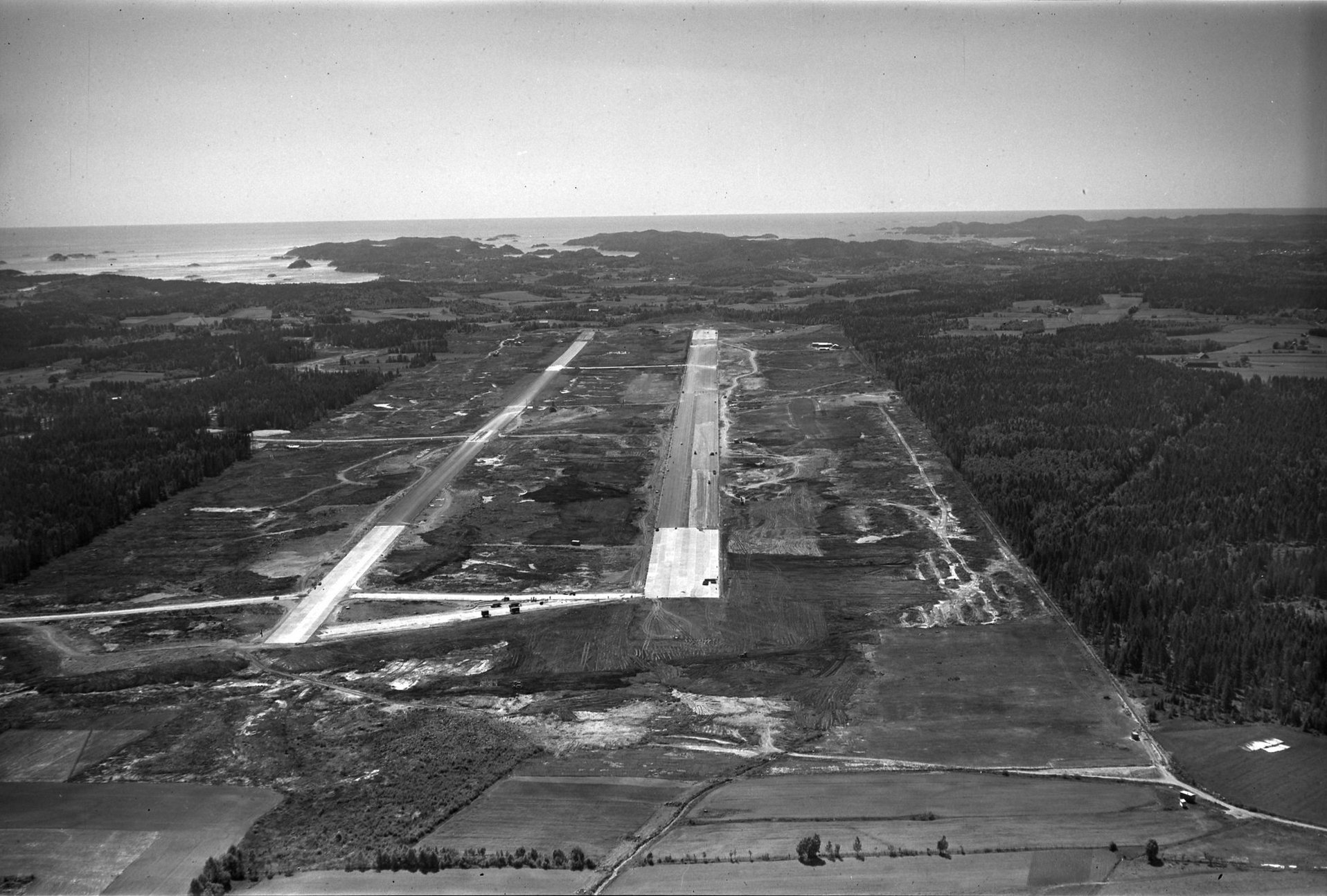
Torp during construction

The interest to use Torp as an air station dwindled during the 1950s. Norway did not need the station for regular stationing of aircraft, and the United States did not need it as long as Norway did not allow permanent stationing of foreign troops. In October 1956, the military stated that they did not mind if Torp also inaugurated a civilian sector. The municipalities established committee, and on 2 October 1957 the Ministry of Transport and Communications granted permission to establish a municipal civilian sector at Torp. At the time, Jarlsberg was still being used for scheduled services to Vestfold, and the plans to open Torp as a civilian airport met political resistance from Tønsberg. The civilian sector would cost NOK 900,000, including a terminal building, a control tower, small maintenance facilities and a tarmac. A limited company, Andelslaget Torp flyplass, was established on 24 October 1958. In addition to the municipalities of Stokke and Sandar, several local companies and private individuals bought shares. The company changed its name to AS Torp Flyplass in 1959.

The first civilian aircraft to land was a Douglas DC-3 from Fred. Olsen Airtransport in 1958. The first scheduled flight was a Braathens SAFE Fokker F27 on 13 October, a route that flew daily from Oslo along the South Coast to Stavanger. The construction was completed on 15 September 1959 and the airport was officially opened on 5 October. On 16 October, both Oslo Airport, Fornebu and Oslo Airport, Gardermoen were closed due to fog, and eight scheduled aircraft were rerouted to Sandefjord. The name of the company was changed to AS Sandefjord Lufthavn in 1960, and the airport named Sandefjord Airport, Torp. Local patriots had expected Braathens SAFE to relocate their route from Jarlsberg to Torp after the opening of the airport, but this was not carried out. Braathens SAFE received concession in 1960 to fly from Oslo via Sandefjord and Kristiansand to Aalborg in Denmark twice a week. The service was terminated after a single season due to Scandinavian Airlines taking over the route, and removing Sandefjord from the schedule.

=== Military activity ===
NATO decided in 1957 to build arsenals for nuclear weapons in all member countries, including Norway. Because the weapons were to be operated only by American personnel, this was in violation with Norwegian base policy. However, foreign personnel was allowed to be based in Norway during war, and therefore infrastructure would be allowed to be built in Norway to allow nuclear weapons to operate from Norway in such a scenario. Norway approved that seven air stations, including Torp, would have conventional ammunition storages that could be converted to nuclear weapons storage facilities in war, and allow the weapons to be transported into Norway following the declaration of war. The arsenals were built underground in bedrock with reinforced concrete.

The arsenal caused massive local protests, and the municipal council made a declaration where it supported the concerns raised about the danger of an explosion. The protests were not taken consideration to, following a report from another division of the military that stated that the risk of an explosion was close to zero. Construction started in May 1961. The hangar that was built at Torp was used by Horten Flyfabrikk from 1956 to 1965. It had up to 270 employees and had previously been based at Jarlsberg. Marinens Hovedverft performed maintenance of a single aircraft in 1967, but terminated operations at Torp afterwards.

=== Slow growth ===
Vestfoldfly was established at Torp in 1961. It operated various charter services, including flights of newspapers. During the 1960s, Vestfoldfly never received a concession for a regular, scheduled flight from Sandefjord to Oslo. The reason was that the Skien-based Fjellfly held the concession for the routes from Oslo to Sandefjord, Tønsberg and Skien. Fjellfly never used its landing rights at Sandefjord, but nevertheless still hindered Vestfoldfly from starting a competing route. The municipalities of Sandefjord and Sandar merged in 1968, giving the Sandefjord a 93.11 percent ownership in the airport. During the entire 1960s, the airport company lost money.

Vestfoldfly split in two in the late 1960s, creating an aviation school which remained in operation until 1999. The other activity was renamed Norsk Flytjeneste. In 1969, Norsk Flytjeneste and Jotun, a large Sandefjord-based industrial company, established Penguin Air Service, where Norsk Flytjeneste owned 25 percent of the shares. Penguin Air Service company bought a six-seat Piper PA-31 Navajo and started charter services for Jotun. In 1975, Bugge Supplyship also joined the joint venture and a second aircraft was bought. Most of the traffic was for the oil industry to Stavanger.

Nordic Air was established in 1970 and commenced cargo charter services out of Torp. They remained in service until 1973. Nor-Fly started operating from Sandefjord in 1974. The airline at first had a Douglas DC-3, and later four Convair 440. The company had been established in 1952, and started flights from Sandefjord to serve commuters and business travelers to Western Norway and the oil industry. The airline applied concessions for scheduled services, but these were rejected by the government. The airline was sold to Partnair in 1985. By the 1970s, the airport company was still losing money, and in 1978 the airport had 3,000 passengers. The following year, the airport had 7,800 passengers, but this fell to 5,400 in 1982.

By the 1980s, Norsk Air had up to four daily round to Stavanger. From 12 January 1984 the airline was permitted to fly these as scheduled flights. Services to Bergen Airport, Flesland started on 10 July. Soon there were four daily round trips to both cities, supplemented by charter trips operated by Penguin. Busy Bee started flights from Torp on 26 March 1984. It operated a single daily round trip from Sandefjord via Stavanger and Haugesund to Bergen. The company never made a profit on the service, and terminated it in 1991. This followed an agreement that one Fokker 50 aircraft was to be sold to Widerøe Norsk Air. Sandefjordbanken established a branch at the airport in 1985.

Norsk Flytjeneste opened their first international route, to Copenhagen Airport on 30 July 1985. It soon changed its name to Norsk Air. With the introduction of Embraer EMB 120 Brasilia, Norsk Air established a route to Göteborg Landvetter Airport and to London Stansted Airport. Neither were profitable, and were quickly terminated. When the airline's owners fell into financial distress and was bought by Widerøe in 1989. They renamed the company Widerøe Norsk Air. On 1 May 1996, Widerøe Norsk Air was merged with Widerøe and ceased to exist. After the merger, Widerøe phased out the Brasilias and replaced them with de Havilland Canada Dash 8 aircraft.

=== Expansion ===
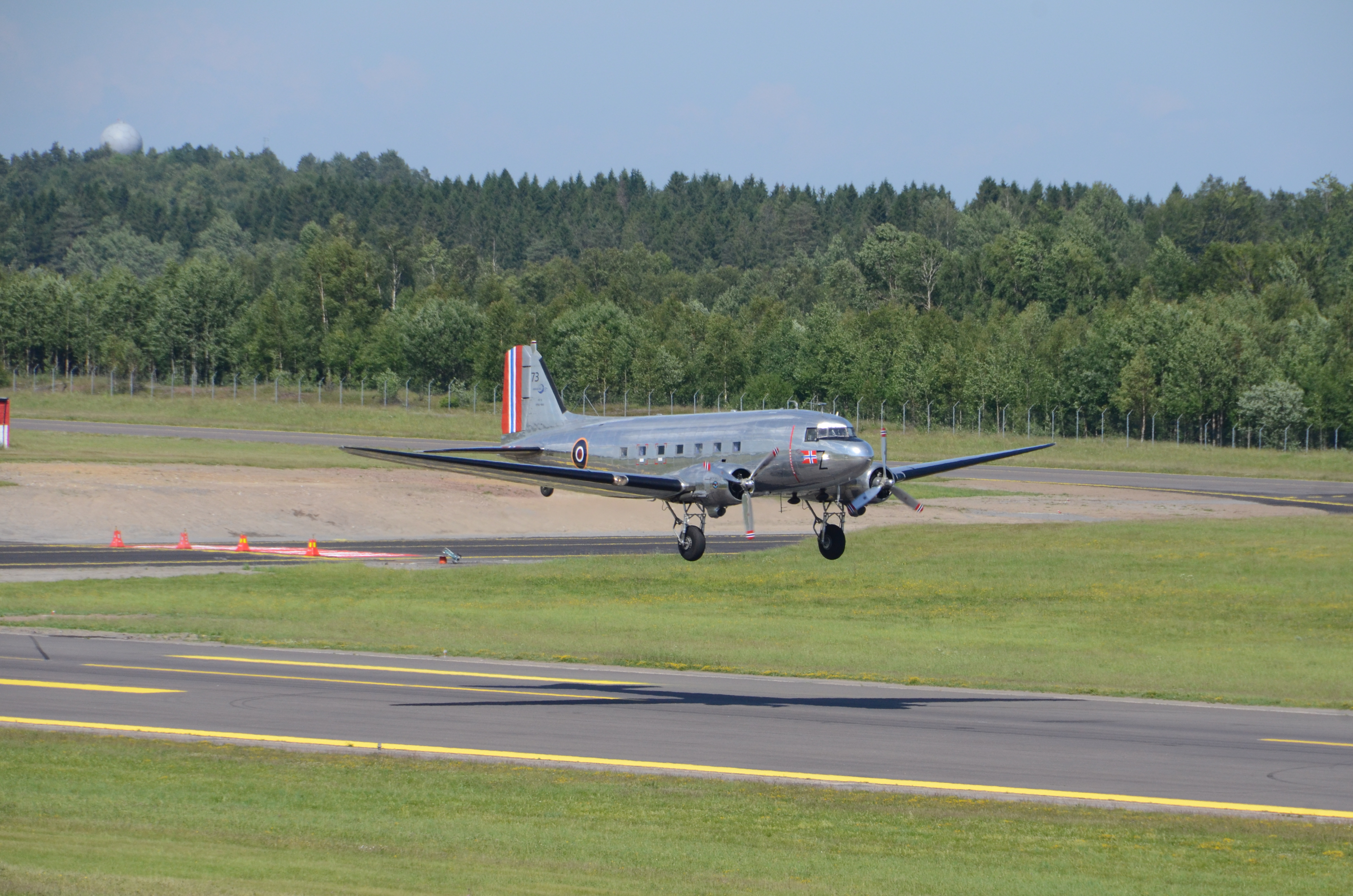
Douglas DC-3 of Dakota Norway landing at Torp

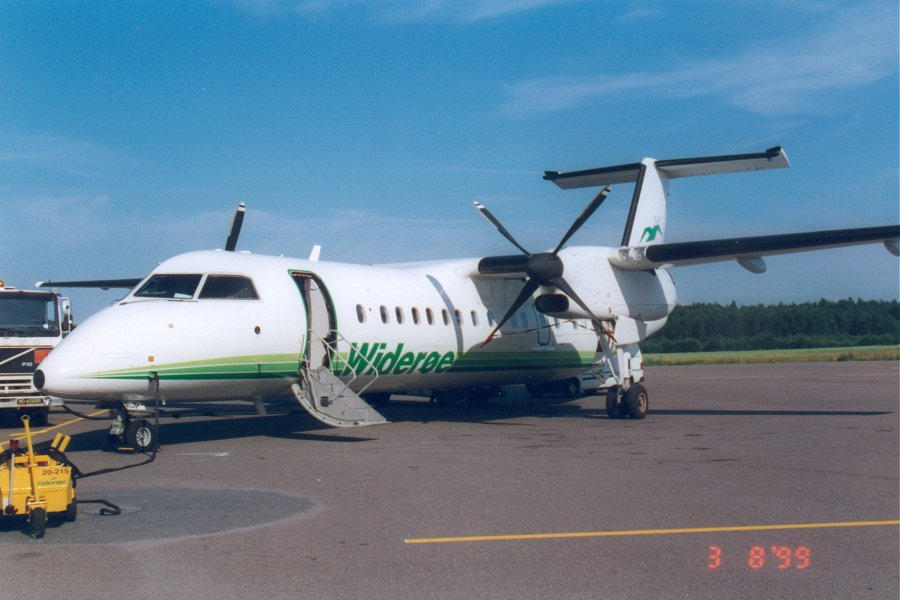
Widerøe de Havilland Canada Dash 8-300 at Torp in 1999

The airport company made a NOK 2.1 million profit in 1985. During the mid-1980s, local commercial interests stated that they wished for more activity at Torp. This led to a public debate about the structure and need for investments in the airport. Three main strategies were proposed: the municipality would sell the airport to private investors; the municipality, Vestfold County Municipality and private investors would take over operation of the airport; or the airport would be taken over—fully or in part—by the state-owned Civil Aviation Administration. In February 1986, Vestfold Industrial Association established the company I/S Vestfold Næringsliv for Torp (VNFT, renamed Vestfold Flyplassinvest in 1997). This company, along with the county municipality and Stokke Municipality, bought part of AS Sandefjord Lufthavn on 28 April 1987 through a private placement of NOK 18 million. This gave Sandefjord an ownership of 42.0 percent, Vestold 35.5 percent, VNFT 13.5 percent and Stokke 9.0 percent.

The new owners concluded that the airport needed a new control tower and a new terminal building. Construction was issued as a public tender in 1987, but the military decided to stop the plans. At this time, a debate about a new location for Oslo Airport had started. One of the proposals was to use Gardermoen, one of the two permanently used air stations in Eastern Norway. The air force was worried that they would have to abandon Gardermoen and relocate to Torp. It would be likely that this would give twenty or forty fighter jets stationed at Torp. The military expansion plans were not in line with the civilian ones. At the same time, the military felt that the existing terminal building was located too close to the arsenal, and that a new terminal had to relocate further away. The airport operators needed additional space. The old terminal had a capacity of 10,000 passengers; in 1984, it served 42,486, and in 1987, 100,907 passengers. By 1990, the issues related to Gardermoen had been resolved, and the military no longer had objections to expanding Torp.

The private placement in 1987 allowed sufficient financing of a new terminal building. It was a 3,000-square-meter (32,000 sq ft) pointed building that was planned to have the largest possible surface facing the tarmac—to allow the highest possible number of aircraft to park. It was constructed in such a way that it could be easily expanded in both directions. The new terminal was completed in 1991 and cost NOK 47 million. This also included a 29,700-kilometer (18,500 mi) tarmac, and expansion of the taxiway and parking for 300 cars. There was also a need to upgrade the runway, which had had no major maintenance since construction. The end of the Cold War had reduced the threat level and the military no longer saw a need to keep Torp at as high a level. However, the civilian airport operator needed the upgrades. They proposed that the airport operator advance the money, but this was rejected by the Defence Estates Agency. NATO decided that they had too many air stations, and was not willing to pay either. The airport operator still took the chance that the military would repay the advance, since it had done so in similar situation earlier. The runway was upgraded for NOK 10 million in 1989, but only NOK 1 million was refunded in 1993. The first charter flights from Torp were conducted in 1989. Saga started flights to Mallorca in 1992, as did Vingreiser. These are today part of MyTravel. Torp Café and Catering Service Partner in 1998.

Following the Oslo Airport localization controversy in the 1980s and early 1990s, Parliament decided to locate the new main airport for Eastern Norway at Gardermoen, north of Oslo. This caused Buskerud, Vestfold and Telemark to grow further from the main airport, strengthening the regional position of Torp. By 1990, the airport was again losing money, with a loss of NOK 2.1 million, but the passenger numbers were up to 137,279. The debate about ownership woke again in 1992, this time with the Civil Aviation Administration considering if it should purchase part of or all of the airport. In 1992 the airport had 142,983 passengers, and the Civil Aviation Administration estimated that the airport would have 280,000 passengers following the closing of Fornebu in 1998. Local politicians did not want to sell the whole airport to the state, and the Civil Aviation Administration was not interested in purchasing part of the airport, so a sale did not go through.

The air traffic employees in the control tower worked for the Civil Aviation Administration. In October 1991, they went on strike demanding that they receive better working conditions. However, the airport owner and the Civil Aviation Administration could not agree on who had the responsibility to build a new tower. Since 1987, the airport operator kept all landing fees, while the Civil Aviation Administration collected the navigation fees. The air force stated that it had no need for an upgrade to the airport, and was not willing to pay for further investments. The Ministry of Transport and Communications stated that the Civil Aviation Administration had previously decided that the state would not give subsidies to Sandefjord Airport, and that such investments must be carried by the operating company. Plans were made, but construction was stopped by the military in 1991.

The next plan was launched in 1996, and parliament decided that the state would finance the new tower. However, when construction was to commence in 1998, the ministry decided that the tower instead should be financed by the airport operator. The ministry stated that this was because they did not want to use the limited state funds, that were entirely generated from user fees, to invest in airports that the state had chosen to not operate. It also stated that investments should be concentrated on security rather than increased capacity, and that the airport operating company had sufficient capital to finance the investments. Construction started in 1999 and was finished in 2001. The tower is identical to the one at Tromsø Airport and cost NOK 40 million.

=== Low-cost airport ===
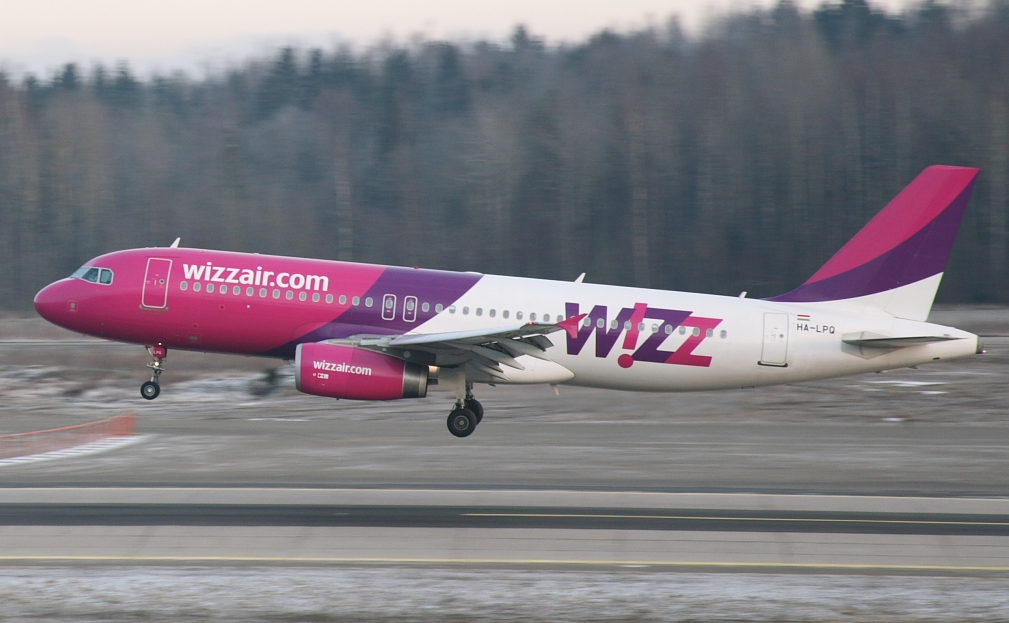
Wizz Air Airbus A320-200 landing at Sandefjord Airport, Torp

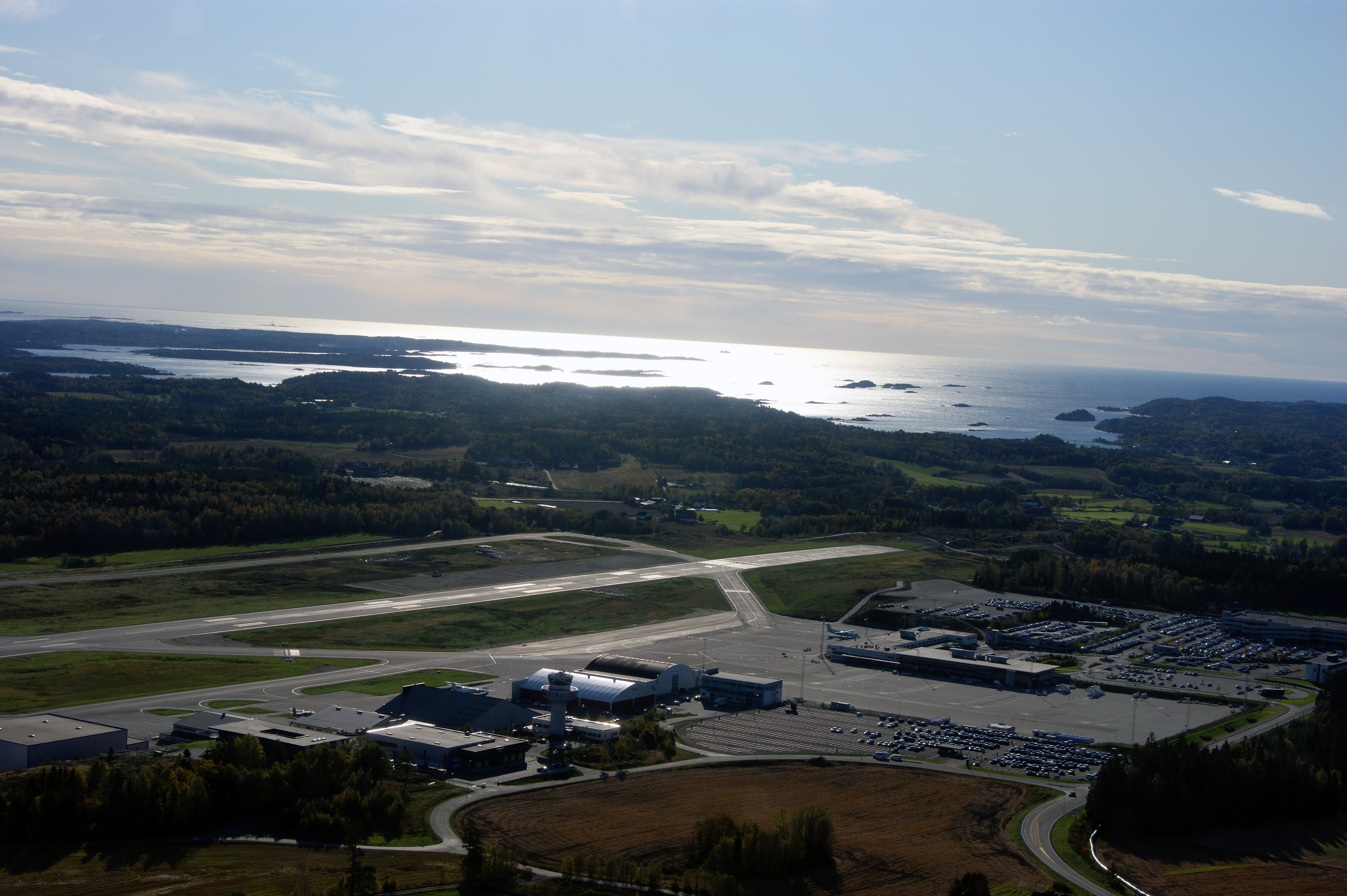
Overview of the airport today

The European aviation market was fully deregulated on 1 April 1997, and concession was no longer needed to fly internationally between countries within the European Economic Area. The Irish airline Ryanair wanted to use this to establish several routes from London Stansted Airport, including Oslo. They intended to market Sandefjord Airport as Oslo South (later Oslo Torp). Ryanair and Torp had meetings to discuss the matter, but the airport instead wanted SAS and Braathens SAFE to establish routes. However, neither of these were interested. To create pressure against Ryanair in the negotiations, the airport operator contacted EasyJet, who also considered flying from London to Torp. In the end, Ryanair was the only airline that established itself following the deregulation. The first Ryanair flight, with a Boeing 737-200, departed on 3 November 1997. The branding of Torp as Oslo caused a heated discussion between the Civil Aviation Administration, after the International Air Transport Association in 1998 placed Sandefjord Airport under the area code for Oslo.

Torp had 158,972 passengers in 1996 and the company lost NOK 1.3 million. In addition, a new private placement was made for NOK 3.5 million by the existing owners. The airport had 410,944 passengers in 1998 and made a profit of NOK 349,000. Sandefjord became the country's tenth-largest airport. The airport grew to 684,431 passengers in 1999 and produced a profit of NOK 23.4 started a restaurant in the terminal building in 1991, which allowed them to provide catering to the airlines. The catering was taken over by Select Service Partner AS. The terminal was expanded to fit 1 million passengers annually, and a new parking house was built. From 1998, Sandefjord Airport strengthened itself in two directions. The commercial interests of Telemark declared that they would focus on using the larger Sandefjord Airport instead of Skien Airport, Geiteryggen. At the same time, the moving of Oslo Airport from Fornebu to Gardermoen made Torp a more viable regional airport. By 2000 the airport had 758,951 passengers. The duty-free store was operated by Norsk Air, later by Widerøe, until 1998, when it was taken over by SAS Catering. It was taken over by Jotunfjell Partners in 2006. The sheriff's office in Sandefjord was responsible for border control at Torp until 1999. From then the airport has been a separate border control office, and by 2004 it had 23 employees. Since 2003 the custom's office for Vestfold is located at Torp, and the Norwegian Customs and Excise Authorities has about fifty employees stationed.

Norwegian leisure airline ConTigo started charter flights using Boeing 727 on 3 November 1996, but terminated services after 22 December. Coast Air started flights from Sandefjord to Haugesund Airport, Karmøy twice daily from 26 October 1998. SAS started two daily flights to Copenhagen from 29 March 1999; these were taken over by Widerøe from 1 January 2002. Braathens, along with its partner KLM, started operating from Sandefjord. KLM offered Fokker 70 services to its hub at Amsterdam Airport Schiphol three times daily from 1 May 1999 through their subsidiary KLM Cityhopper. Braathens started operating services with Boeing 737s to Stavanger and Bergen on 9 May, but terminated the services from 1 November due to low yield. Sun Air of Scandinavia, a franchise of British Airways, started flights from Torp to Billund Airport on 1 November 1999, but this was terminated in March 2000. GuardAir started flights from Torp to Ålesund Airport, Vigra, Kristiansand and Gothenburg in 1998, as well as moving the company's head offices to Torp, but the airline went bankrupt in 2001.

=== Development since the 2000s ===
Swedish low-cost airline Goodjet started flights from Torp to Beauvais–Tillé Airport near Paris on 15 July 2002 using Airbus A320-200 aircraft. The airline terminated all services on 6 December of the same year.

Ryanair commenced flights to Glasgow Prestwick Airport on 4 April 2002. The same year, the airport expanded the international arrival section, and the airport passed one million annual passengers, and the airport is the seventh largest in the country. The profit had sunk to NOK 9.3 million. A new 6,000-square-meter (65,000 sq ft) international terminal was opened in 2003. On 4 April, Ryanair started a service to Stockholm Skavsta Airport. The airport had 1,084,244 passengers in 2004, and a revenue of NOK 163.2 million. A survey conducted in 2004 showed that 64 percent of the passengers at Torp were tourist rather than business travelers, about twice the level of other airports. The same year, both Widerøe and Ryanair had 450,000 passengers, while KLM had 80,000. The largest destination was London with 250,000 passengers, followed by Copenhagen and Frankfurt with 120,000.

During the planning of high-speed upgrade of the line, plans called to move the line to create a station integrated in the airport terminal, as had been done with Oslo Airport Station and Trondheim Airport Station. However, as the construction of a new Vestfold Line was put on hold, an intermediate solution was found to reopen Råstad Station, and offer a shuttle bus to the airport. On 16 May 2007, Vestfold County Municipality announced that they would forward the investment costs of NOK 7 million for the new station, with a payback from the National Rail Administration by 2012. The latter would build, own and operate the station. The station opened on 21 January 2008, and the new platform is located on the east side of the tracks. The old station building, location in the west side, has been converted into a museum. During the first year, 80,000 passengers used the station, sufficient to make the NOK 4.5 million used by NSB on the shuttle bus profitable.

As a decision was made to close Moss Airport, Rygge by 30 October 2016, Ryanair announced in July 2016 it would relocate several routes from Moss to Sandefjord by then.

On 10 January 2024, after almost 25 years of operations at the airport, KLM announced the termination of its route to Amsterdam, effective from 31 March 2024. According to KLM, the decision was made due to slot restrictions at Schiphol, as well as that passenger numbers on the route had not returned to pre COVID-19 pandemic levels. As the route was quite popular locally for its offering of connecting flights to KLM's other destinations, the decision was met with severe criticism by civilians, businesses, as well as local and regional politicians.

== Facilities ==
=== Overview ===
The runway runs due north–south (18/36). It is 2,989 by 45 meters (9,806 by 148 ft) and in asphalt, except both 500 meters (1,600 ft) ends that are in concrete. There is a taxiway on the far side of the terminal building. The airport is equipped with instrument landing system category 2 from both ends. The control tower services are operated by Avinor. The tarmac has eleven aircraft stands. Deicing is available. Widerøe Ground Handling is the only handling agent at the airport.

=== Maintenance ===
Widerøe has the largest maintenance facility at Torp, providing full maintenance for the airlines own fleet of Dash 8 series 100, 300, and 400 aircraft. Helifly provides maintenance for both aircraft and helicopters. Flyvedlikehold provides maintenance for both aircraft and helicopters, engines, and is a retailer of pilot accessories like headsets, helmets, and so on.

== Airlines and destinations ==
The following airlines operate regular scheduled and charter services to and from Sandefjord:

Airlines	Destinations
airBaltic	Seasonal: Gran Canaria
Norwegian Air Shuttle	Alicante, Málaga; Seasonal: Gran Canaria, Palma de Mallorca
Ryanair	Alicante, Bergamo, Gdańsk, Kraków, London–Stansted, Málaga, Manchester, Poznań, Riga, Wrocław; Seasonal: Dubrovnik, Pisa, Zagreb
Scandinavian Airlines	Copenhagen
Sunclass Airlines	Seasonal charter: Chania, Gran Canaria, Larnaca
Widerøe	Bergen, Stavanger, Trondheim; Seasonal: Nice; Seasonal charter: Chania, Rhodes
Wizz Air	Bucharest–Otopeni, Cluj-Napoca, Skopje, Tirana, Warsaw–Chopin

== Ground transport ==
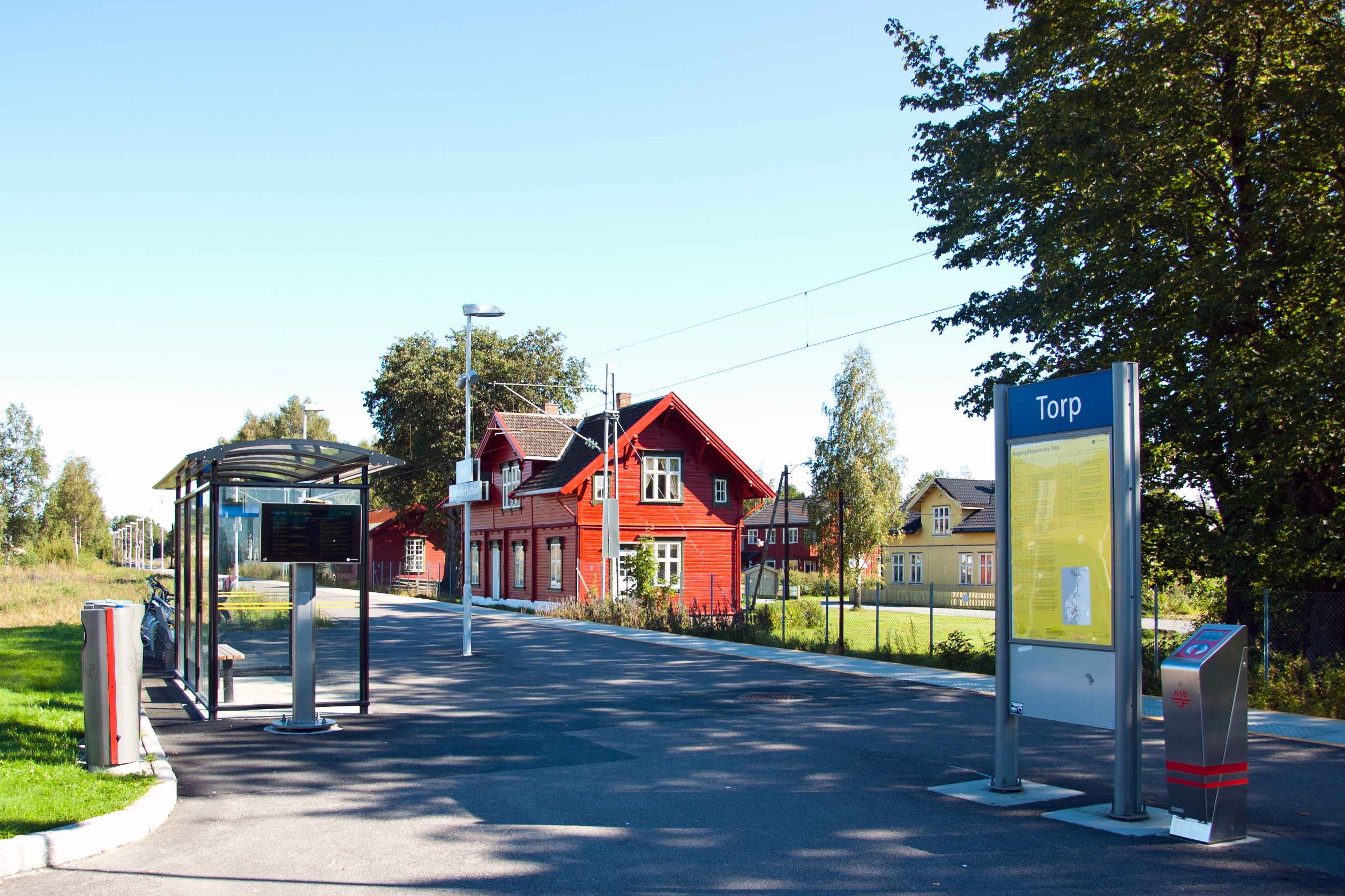
The train station

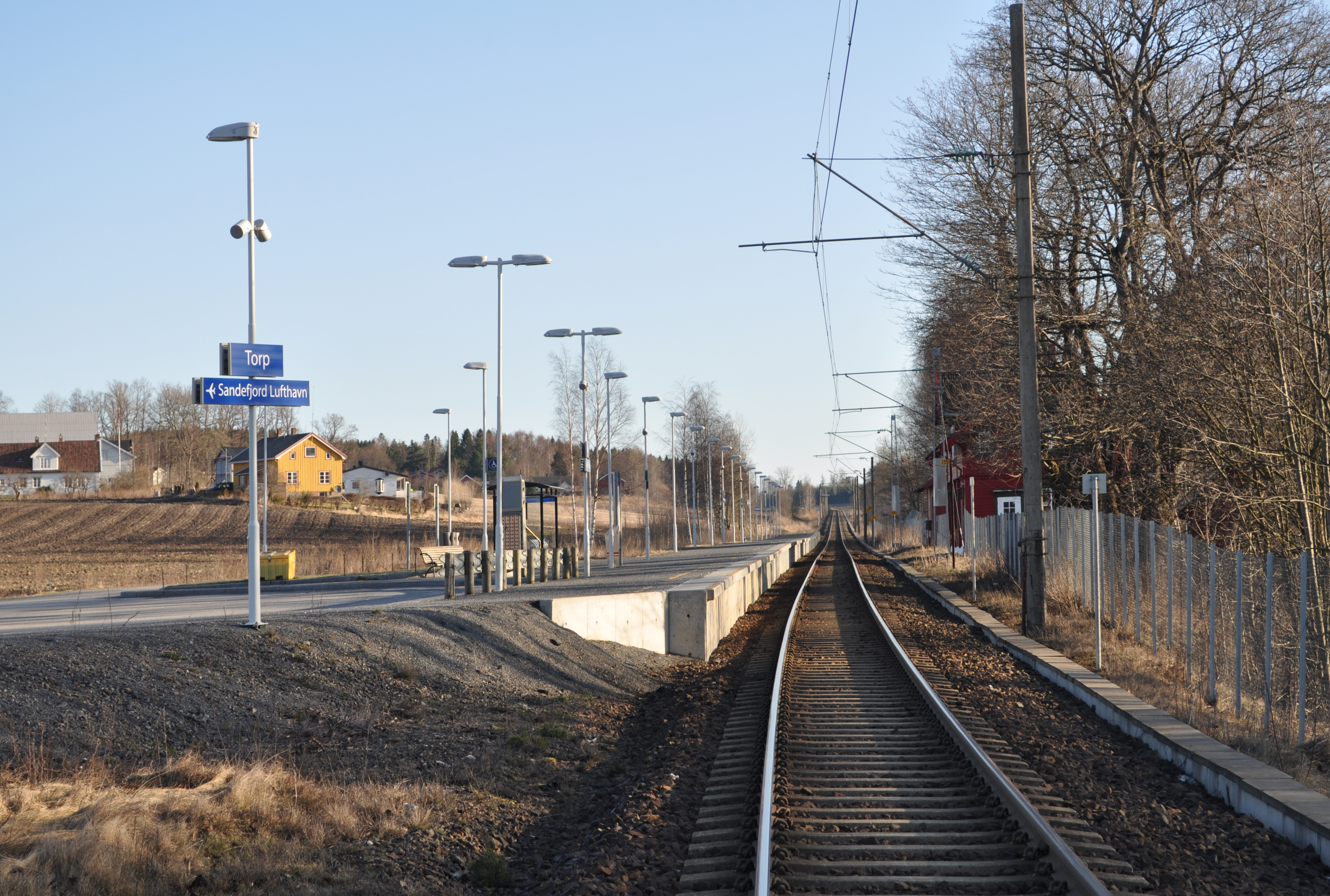
Sandefjord Airport, Torp station

=== Rail ===
Sandefjord Airport Station is located on the Vestfold Line, about 3 kilometres (2 mi) from the airport. It is served by regional trains that operate between Lillehammer—via Oslo Airport and Oslo Central Station—and Skien. There are hourly trains in each direction, supplemented by rush-hour trains. Travel time to Oslo is 1 hour 48 minutes, and to Oslo Airport it is 2 hours 23 minutes. A shuttle bus meets all trains during the opening hours of the airport, and a bus trip takes four minutes to the airport terminal. The shuttle bus leaves the airport ten minutes before each train's scheduled departure. The bus is operated by NSB and is included in the price of the train ticket. There are 42 bus departures each day.

=== Coach ===
Torp-Ekspressen is a coach service operated by Unibuss Ekspress to Oslo connecting with all Ryanair's and Wizz Air's flights. Travel time is 1 hour and 50 minutes. Telemarkekspressen, a NOR-WAY Bussekspress service operated by Telemark Bilruter, offers coach services to Telemark, including Skien, Porsgrunn, Ulefoss, Bø and Seljord. The Vy express service Sørlandsekspressen operates from a halt on the E18 (not from the airport terminal) to several cities along the South Coast to Kristiansand. From Østfold, the service Flybåten Express Østfold–Vestfold operates a coach on the Moss–Horten Ferry to Torp. This involves a change of coach in Tønsberg. During winter, there are occasional buses that connect to ski resorts in Gol, Geilo and Hemsedal.

=== Car ===
Sandefjord Airport is located 3 kilometres (2 mi) off the European Route E18. Travel distance to Sandefjord is 10 kilometres (6.2 mi) and to Oslo is 110 kilometres (68 mi). The distance to Oslo Airport, Gardermoen is 167 kilometres (104 mi), and to Moss Airport, Rygge is 63 kilometres (39 mi) (via the Moss–Horten Ferry).

== Accidents and incidents ==
- On 28 December 2024, KLM Flight 1204, a Boeing 737-800 skidded off to the right off the runway exit during an emergency landing shortly after taking off from Oslo Airport. All 182 occupants were uninjured, and were kept on board until stairs for disembarkation were in place. As of July 2025, the incident is under investigation by the Norwegian Safety Investigation Authority

== Trivia ==
- Torp is home of Norway's only flying Douglas DC-3. It is operated by Dakota Norway, a non-profit organization, and tours around Vestfold County are available on some days during the summer season. The aircraft was built in 1943. It had its maiden flight on December 17, 1935, and was used as a passenger plane in the United States from 1936.
- Torp also houses a North American Harvard training aircraft from World War II. The plane was utilized by the Norwegian Air Force until the 1950s.
- Deadline Torp (2005), a two-part TV series based on the 1994 Torp hostage crisis, partially filmed at Torp. It was directed by Nils Gaup and written by Jo Nesbø.

== Bibliography ==
- Tjomsland, Audun (2005). Høyt spill om Torp (in Norwegian). Sandefjord: Tjomsland Media. ISBN 82-997212-0-2.
