= Odd Isaachsen Willoch =

Norwegian naval officer (1885–1940)

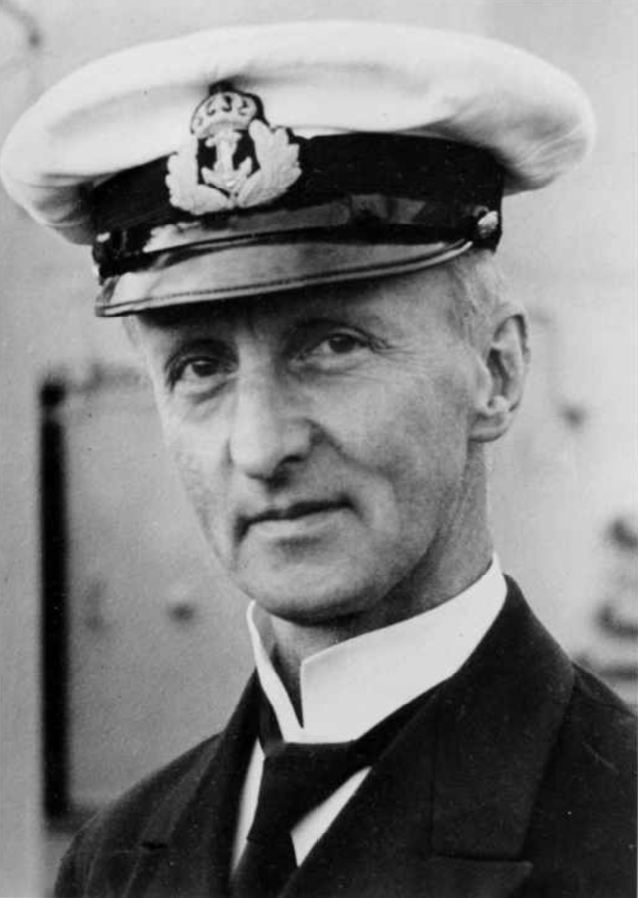
- Born: 26 February 1885; Larvik, Norway
- Died: 9 April 1940 (aged 55) Just off the port of Narvik
- Allegiance: Norway
- Branch: Royal Norwegian Navy
- Rank: Captain
- Commands: HNoMS Fridtjof Nansen; HNoMS Michael Sars; HNoMS Eidsvold
- Conflicts: Second World War: German invasion of Narvik †
- Awards: (Norway) Haakon VII Coronation Medal (Iceland) Order of the Falcon (France) Légion d'honneur
- Spouse: Marie Kristine ("Maja") Foss (m. 1911)

Odd Isaachsen Willoch (26 February 1885 – 9 April 1940) was a Norwegian naval officer who commanded one of the two coastal defence ships defending Narvik during the German invasion of Norway on 9 April 1940.

== Personal life ==
Odd Isaachsen Willoch was born in Larvik, the son of chief engineer Einar Isaachsen and his wife Hannah (née Isaachsen). Willoch's grandfather was politician Isaach Isaachsen. He was a nephew of painter Olaf Isaachsen, and a cousin of painter Herman Willoch, physicist Daniel Isaachsen and scientist Haakon Isaachsen.

He was the father of businessman Finn Isaachsen Willoch, and through him the grandfather of politician Ingrid I. Willoch. In addition, Odd Isaachsen Willoch was the uncle of national aviation director Erik I. Willoch and Prime Minister 1981–1986 Kåre I. Willoch.

In 1911 Willoch married Marie Kristine ("Maja") Foss (born 1888 in Mosjøen), fathering three children with her. They lived in Horten.

== Career ==
Odd Isaachsen Willoch made a career in the Royal Norwegian Navy, attending the Norwegian Military Academy and studying radio technology in the United Kingdom. Before the Second World War he commanded the offshore patrol vessels Fridtjof Nansen and Michael Sars. In 1928 Willoch took part in the search for the Latham 47 flying boat that had disappeared over the Barents Sea while carrying the Norwegian explorer Roald Amundsen.

By 1940 he had reached the rank of Captain (kommandørkaptein) and commanded the coastal defence ship HNoMS Eidsvold.

=== Second World War ===
On 9 April 1940 Norway was invaded by German forces as part of the Operation Weserübung. The northern port of Narvik, defended amongst other sea and land units by HNoMS Eidsvold and her sister ship HNoMS Norge, was one of their most important targets due its role as an all-year export port of Swedish iron ore.

As part of the Royal Norwegian Navy's efforts to protect and defend Norway's neutrality in the Second World War Norge and Eidsvold, the largest and most heavily armed Norwegian warships in service, had been based in Narvik. The 4,000 ton vessels and their commanders and crews were under orders to fire at any intruder, Narvik was under any and all circumstances to be defended by force. During the night of 8/9 April 1940 reports started coming in of German attacks further south in Norway, in the Oslofjord, at Bergen and at Trondheim. It was still, however, unclear of who would reach Narvik first, the Germans or the British. It was known to the Norwegian commanders that the Royal Navy operated with a large force just off Northern Norway and it was therefore anticipated that these naval forces might attack Narvik to destroy the numerous German cargo ships in the port. In all there were 25 civilian ships of various nationalities in the port of Narvik in the morning of 9 April 1940. For several weeks the Norwegian coastal defence ships had been preparing for war, carrying out intense gunnery exercises with live ammunition. The situation had steadily become more and more tense since the Altmark Incident on 16 February 1940.

In the early hours of 9 April Willoch moved his warship out of Narvik harbour to a position north of the Framnesodden peninsula. Soon after radio messages were received from the patrol boat Kelt further out in the Ofotfjord, relayed from Norge, that nine German destroyers were sailing towards Narvik. The tenth destroyer had been delayed and was lagging behind the rest of the German force. By 0400hrs visibility was so poor that the crew of the Eidsvold could not see land although they were only around 500 metres (550 yd) from shore, at which point Willoch ordered that his ship was to raise anchor. At 0415hrs the first two German ships were spotted.

As the German naval force of 10 destroyers attempted to enter Narvik Harbour Willoch challenged them, signalling the lead destroyer. When the intruding ships failed to reply to the light signals Eidsvold fired a warning shot from one of her 76 mm (3 inch) guns. In response to the warning shot the German flotilla commander, Kapitän zur See Friedrich Bonte, despatched an emissary to the Eidsvold. The German officer told Willoch that the Germans were "coming as friends", but that the Norwegians had to hand over their warships to the German armed forces. Captain Willoch asked for time to consult his commander, Captain Per Askim, the commander of Norge. This request was refused by the Germans, but while Willoch had been talking to the German officer the radio officer on board the Eidsvold had communicated the events to Askim. Askim's response to the German demands and order to Willoch came immediately; Willoch and the Eidsvold was to open fire. Willoch responded to Askim; "I am attacking". While this was going on the German destroyer Wilhelm Heidkamp had positioned herself 700 metres (770 yd) off the port side of Eidsvold and trained her torpedo launchers on the Norwegian ship.

When the order came from Askim the German officer was about to leave to Eidsvold to return to his own vessel, but he was called back by the Norwegians and informed that the demands were not going to be met and that the Norwegian warship was to resist the German encroachment. The German officer did not reply to the Norwegian statements, but when the German launch set off away from the Eidsvold the people on board fired a red signal flare. As the Germans moved away in their launch Willoch commanded his port battery to open fire and a drum signal was initiated. Willoch shouted to the crewmen around him: "På plass ved kanonene. Nå skal vi slåss, gutter!" (English: "Man the guns. We're going to fight, boys!"). Seconds later, as Eidsvold had closed the distance to Wilhelm Heidkamp to 300 metres (330 yd), but before the large-calibre guns of the Eidsvold could open fire, three torpedoes struck her. Just before the torpedoes, hit the ship's battery commander had given the order; "Port battery, salvo". One of the German torpedoes hit the main ammunition hold, tearing apart Eidsvold, killing many crewmen and leaving the initial survivors swimming in water only just above freezing. Eidsvold broke in two and sank in 15 seconds, the stern disappearing last at 0437hrs. Only six seamen survived the sinking of Eidsvold; Willoch was not among the survivors.

== Honours ==
Willoch was awarded with the Haakon VII Coronation Medal, he was a Knight of the Icelandic Order of the Falcon and a Chevalier of the French Légion d'honneur.

== Literature ==
- Bjørnsen, Bjørn (1977). Det utrolige døgnet (in Norwegian). Oslo: Gyldendal Norsk Forlag. ISBN 82-05-10553-7.
- Hauge, Andreas (1995). Kampene i Norge 1940 (in Norwegian). Vol. 2. Sandefjord: Krigshistorisk Forlag. ISBN 82-993369-0-2.
- Høgevold, John (1984). Vår militære innsats hjemme og ute 1940–45 (in Norwegian). Oslo: Norwegian High Command. ISBN 82-991210-0-0.
- Kristiansen, Trond (2006). Fjordkrigen – Sjømilitær motstand mot den tyske invasjonsflåten i 1940 (in Norwegian). Harstad: Forlaget Kristiansen. ISBN 82-997054-2-8.
