= Tønsberg Airport, Jarlsberg =

Tønsberg Airport, Jarlsberg Tønsberg flyplass, Jarlsberg
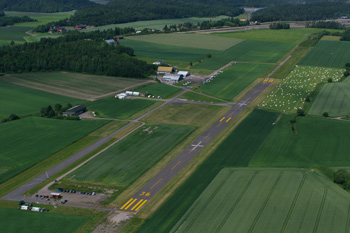
- IATA: none; ICAO: ENJB

Summary
- Airport type: Private
- Owner: Thor Solberg Aviation
- Operator: Jarlsberg Luftsportssenter
- Serves: Tønsberg
- Location: Tønsberg Municipality
- Elevation AMSL: 10 m (33 ft)
- Coordinates: 59°18′N 010°22′E
- Website: Official site

Map
- Location in Norway

Runways
Direction	Length		Surface
Direction	m	ft	Surface
18/36	800	2,625	Asphalt

Tønsberg Airport, Jarlsberg (Norwegian: Tønsberg flyplass, Jarlsberg; ICAO: ENJB) is a private, general aviation airport located at Sem in Tønsberg, Norway. It consists of a 799-by-18-meter (2,621 by 59 ft) asphalted runway and a 900-meter (3,000 ft) taxiway. Jarlsberg is used for a variety of activities, including glider pilots, light and microlight aircraft, radio-controlled aircraft, parachuting and the annual air show Wings & Wheels. The airport is owned by Thor Solberg Aviation and operated by Jarlsberg Luftsportssenter.

The airport opened in 1937 and was taken over by the Luftwaffe in 1940. It was at first used as a dummy airfield, but from 1944 the Luftwaffe carried out upgrades. These were not finished by the end of Second World War. Jarlsberg was from 1947 to 1959 used by the Royal Norwegian Air Force (RNoAF), although the functions were eventually taken over by the nearby Sandefjord Airport, Torp. Braathens SAFE operated scheduled services from 1952 to 1959, and later Thor Solberg and Fred. Olsen Airtransport also operated scheduled services. Activity has been limited to various general aviation activities since the late 1960s.

== History ==
=== Establishment and the Second World War ===
Tønsberg Modellflyklubb was established in 1936 and Tønsberg Flyveklubb was established on 18 May 1937 and incorporated on 29 May. The latter immediately purchased a 5.3 hectares (13 acres) section of land, on which they established a primitive air strip for both clubs. They organized Vestfold's first air show on 4 June, where a parachuter lost his life after his parachute failed to deploy. The aviation club bought its first aircraft, a Taylor Cub in 1938. Tønsberg Seilflyklubb was established the following year, and the municipality started looking into the possibilities of building a commercial airport at the site.

Following the German occupation of Norway in 1940, Jarlsberg was taken over by the Luftwaffe in August. It initially established a dummy airfield by installing runway lights and decoy aircraft and fuel drums. Plans were made to establish a real airport at Jarlsberg, with construction commencing in early 1944. The Luftwaffe expropriated 31.5 hectares (78 acres) of land from surrounding farms and used a combination of Norwegian and Soviet prisoners of war for labor. The farmhouse at Fyllpå was requisitioned and used for offices, and the runway was planned to measure 1,400 by 225 meters (4,593 by 738 ft). By the German capitulation on 8 May 1945 the leveling work was nearly competed. The value of the work was ca. half a million Norwegian krone (NOK).

=== Military use and scheduled flights ===
The airport was taken over by the Ministry of Transport and Communications, and the work was stopped. A military airport in Vestfold was considered, either at Jarlsberg or at Torp. By 1947 Jarlsberg had been sufficiently renovated to be used for taxi flights. By 1948 the airport was being considered as an alternative airport to Oslo Airport, Fornebu, and from 1949 an aviation school was established and there is an increased amount of military activity at the airport. Sem and Tønsberg Municipalities took over ownership and operation of the airport.

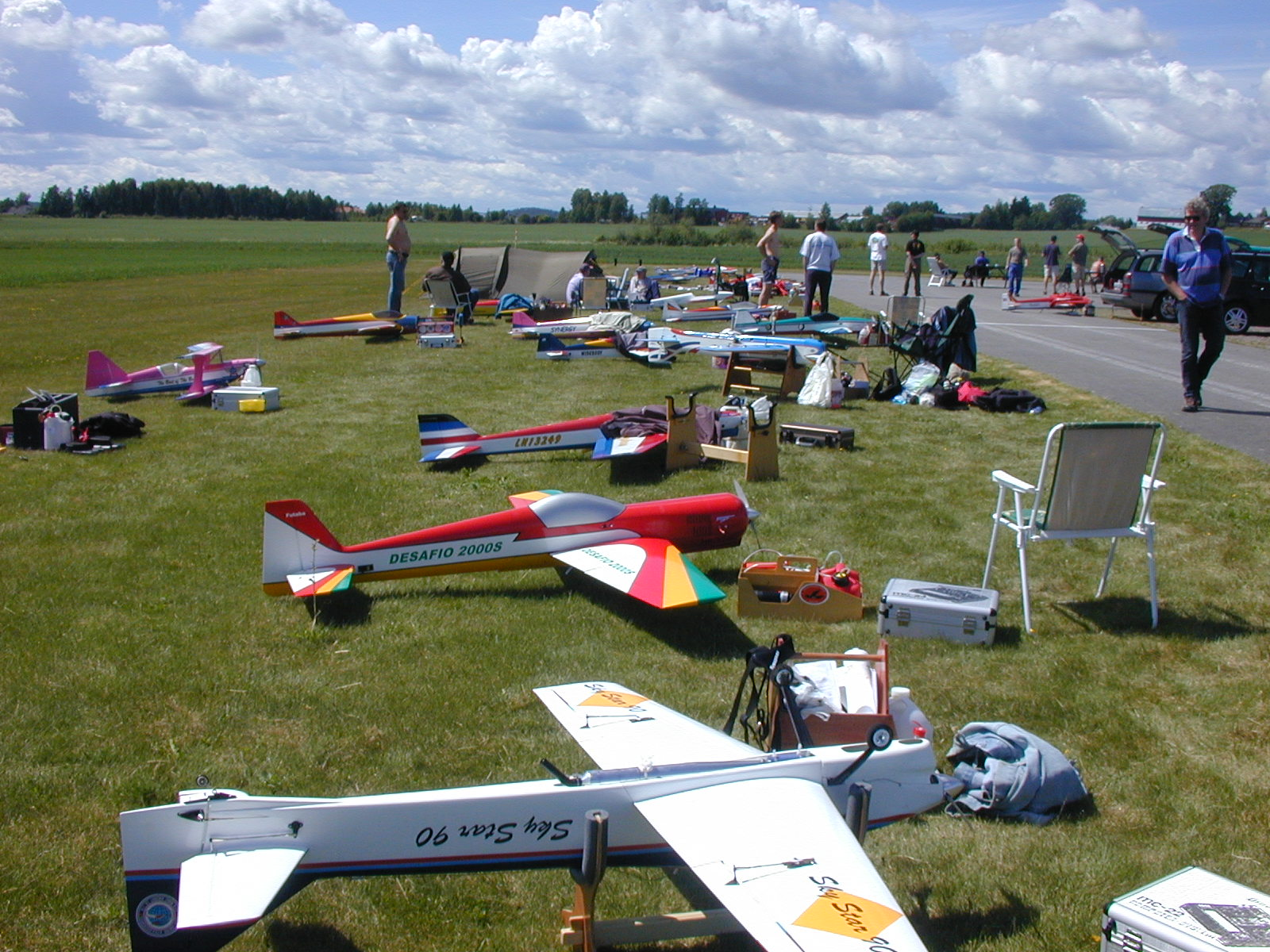
Model aircraft at Jarlsberg

By the last years of the 1940s the military regained some of its interest for the airport. A decision was made in 1950 to expand airport, initially to a runway length of 1,200 meters (3,900 ft). It was approved for heavy aircraft the following year. Jarlsberg was one of seven air stations which the RNoAF targeted, and built to serve Supermarine Spitfire and de Havilland Vampire. However, the investment was quick reconsidered with the order of the Republic F-84 Thunderjet. Investments were soon halted, although Jarlsberg was used until the completion of Rygge Air Station and Torp Air Station. It also acted as a backup when Fornebu and Oslo Airport, Gardermoen were closed.

The RNoAF moved its Commander Wing from Fornebu to Jarlsberg in 1953. It consisted of a Noorduyn Norseman and two Fairchild PT-19, which were mostly used for transport and surveying flights. They only remained at Jarlsberg until 15 November 1954, when it was moved to Gardermoen Air Station. The military continued to use Jarlsberg as a point of access for the aviation workshop at Karljohansvern in Horten Municipality, which carried maintenance on some of the air force's smaller aircraft. By 1957 there had been invested NOK 7 million in Jarlsberg, most of which had been paid for by the state.

Braathens SAFE started considering commercial flights to Tønsberg in 1951, as part of its proposed network for its newly acquired de Havilland Heron aircraft, and applied for a concession to operate a route from Fornebu via Jarlsberg to Stavanger Airport, Sola. The permits were issued on 28 July 1952 and the first scheduled flight took place on 18 August. Braathens SAFE replaced its Herons with the larger Fokker F27 Friendship in the late 1950s. The new aircraft were too large to operate at Jarlsberg and Braathens therefore terminated its flights to the airport from 1958.

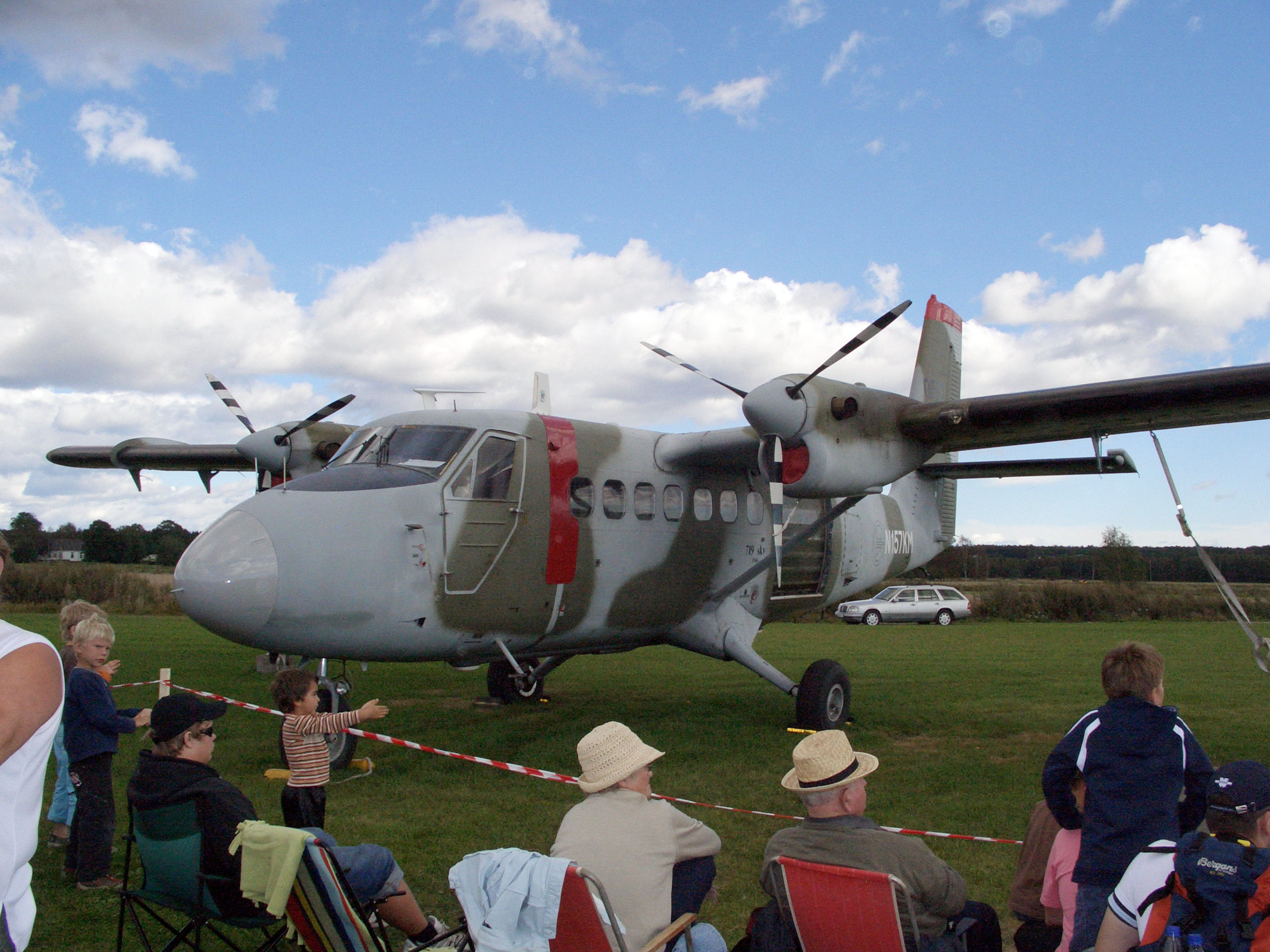
A heritage Royal Norwegian Air Force Twin Otter at Jarlsberg in 2007

Thor Solberg Aviation established an aviation school at Jarlsberg in 1955, the same year as Fred. Olsen Airtransport commenced regular cargo flights. The aviation club sold their 5.3 hectares (13 acres) lot to the owner municipalities in 1956, on the condition that the airport would remain open. For this Tønsberg Municipality paid NOK 62,500. The same year Jarlsberg became was designated as a national center for sailplanes. The airport set a record 18,000 aircraft movements in 1958 and Thor Solberg started a regular taxi route to Notodden Airport, Tuven. Trial flights were carried out the following year on the route Tønsberg–Fornebu–Notodden–Hamar Airport, Stafsberg.

=== Solberg take-over ===
The air force withdrew entirely form the airport in 1959, which spurred discussions between the involved parties regarding the ownership of the airport. A settlement was reached in 1960, where the municipalities of Sem and Tønsberg bought the airport for NOK 1 million from the state. The following year they sold it for NOK 850,000 to Thor Solberg Aviation, on the condition that the company continue to operate the airport. The first Norwegian championship in radio-controlled aircraft was held at Jarlsberg in 1962. Thor Solberg retained operations at the airport until 1967. The company then attempted to sell the airport, first to Øyvind Skauenfeldt in 1969, then to Sem and Tønsberg Municipalities in 1970 and then to Skauenfeldt again in 1972, but neither were interested in paying the quoted price.

The lack of use caused the airport to start dilapidating. The aviation club commenced renovations in 1974 and from the following year started organizing an annual air show. Thor Solberg Aviation defaulted on its requirement to keep the airport operational for private flights, and a five-year lease was signed with the aviation club. Their air show in 1979 drew 10,000 spectators and the following year they started building a new hangar. Tønsberg Fallskjermklubb, a parachute club, was established in 1981. Thor Solberg Aviation attempted to remove the aviation clubs as tenants and users of the airport in 1983. The issue was brought before Tønsberg District Court, but the issue was dismissed.

Øyvind Skauenfeldt started leasing the airport from 1984, forwarding the lease to Skylift, which established a helicopter school at Jarlsberg. Sem Municipality attempted to resolve the issue by applying its right of first refusal to buy the airfield in 1985, and the following year launched plans to upgrade it to a 1,200-meter (3,900 ft) runway and establish it as public regional airport. The proposal was dismissed by Thor Solberg Aviation, who stated that the airport was not for sale. Sem Municipal Council abandoned the plans in 1987. Helifly established itself in 1989, the same year as Skauenfeldt's lease expired and Solberg failed to renew the operating license for the airport. Solberg attempted to get the Civil Aviation Administration (CAA) to deny the aviation clubs from using the airport, but the CAA dismissed the case.

=== Jarlsberg Luftsportssenter ===
Jarlsberg Luftsportssenter ENJB was incorporated on 7 March 1991 with the intention of renovating and potentially taking over the airport. The following year Solberg reported the aviation club to the police for illegal use of the airfield, but the issue was rejected. Solberg followed up by not renewing the operating certificate after it expired at the end of 1992, causing the airport to be closed. The runway was in this period used as a go-cart track. Jarlsberg Luftsportssenter received a building permit for new facilities, including an extension of the runway to 1,000 meters (3,300 ft), on 19 June 1993. The municipality therefore announced on 9 December that it would attempt to expropriate the airport.

The closing ended in litigation, and a settlement was reaching in June 1994, although the airport was not reopened until 19 October. A series of upgrades were carried out, and the airport received a five-year regular operating license from August 1995. The involved parties started negotiations in 1997 regarding the sale of the airport and Solberg put up the airport for sale. Investigations carried out by the CAA concluded with that the airport needed upgrades for NOK 5 to 6 million to meet regulations.

The airport operating company made an agreement with a local farmer to make a joint bid for the lot, whereby the farmer would receive agricultural land and the operating company the airport facilities. The lot was at the time valuated at NOK 2 to 3 million, while Solberg was asking for NOK 10 million. The company withdrew the offer to sell the airport in 1999. A long-term lease was agreed upon in 2000. The airport received NOK 4 million in subsidies from the CAA, which were used to upgrade the runway and drainage system. The airport reopened on 11 August 2000.

Helifly terminated its operations at Jarlsberg from 1 July 2001. Two simulators were installed in April 2002 and the first street legal car show was organized by the American Car Club later that year. The following year the municipality started again working on expropriation of the airport and the first Wings & Wheels show was organized. Tønsberg Municipal Council voted with 47 against 2 votes on 10 November 2004 to expropriate the airport. At the same time a new hangar was opened. A complaint regarding the expropriation was rejected by the Vestfold County Governor in 2006, resulting in Solberg suing the municipality.

== Facilities ==
The airport is owned by Thor Solberg Aviation and is operated by Jarlsberg Luftsportssenter. The airport has an asphalt runway aligned 18–36 (north–south), which measures 799 by 18 meters (2,621 by 59 ft). To the west is a 900-meter (3,000 ft) taxiway. Five clubs are based at the airport: Tønsberg Flyveklubb (aircraft), Tønsberg Seilflyklubb (gliders), Tønsberg Modellflyklubb (radio-controlled planes), Tønsberg Fallskjermklubb (parachuting) and Jarlsberg Mikroflyklubb (microplanes). In addition there are three hangars, owned by the operating company, a privately owned hangar and one owned by Warbirds of Norway. JSL Sim operates a facility with simulators.
