= Sverre Quale =

Norwegian businessman

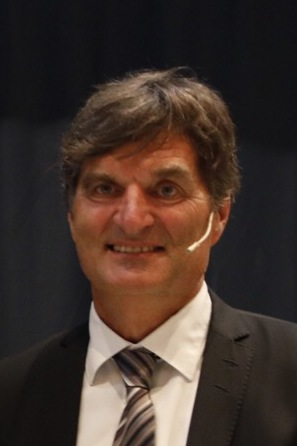
Sverre Quale

Sverre Quale (born 21 July 1956 in Mo i Rana, Helgeland) is a Norwegian civil servant and businessperson.

He grew up in Mo i Rana and currently lives in Billingstad. He is a siv. ing. by education, graduating from the Norwegian Institute of Technology in 1982.

He was the director of safety in Saga Petroleum from 1990 to 1999. He directed the Norwegian Railway Inspectorate from 1999 to 2002, during the time of the Åsta train accident. He then spent one year as director of safety in Avinor, before sitting as director of the Norwegian Accident Investigation Board from 2003 to 2006. In 2006 he became CEO of Avinor. He has also chairman of the board of Oslo Lufthavn and board member of Gassco.

In 2010 he was announced as the new CEO of Multiconsult. He was succeeded in November 2010 by acting CEO Nic. Nilsen.

Government offices
Preceded by Gro Seim	Director of the Norwegian Railway Inspectorate; 1999–2002	Succeeded by Erik Ø. Johnsen
Preceded by Finn Heimdal	Director of the Norwegian Accident Investigation Board; 2003–2006	Succeeded by Grete Myhre
Business positions
Preceded by Nic. Nilsen (acting)	CEO of Avinor; 2006–2010	Succeeded by Nic. Nilsen (acting)
