= Nic. Nilsen =

Norwegian businessperson (born 1944)

Nicolay William Nilsen (born 1944) is a Norwegian businessperson.

He is the current CEO of Oslo Lufthavn AS, the company that manages the Oslo Airport, Gardermoen. He started working at Gardermoen in 1995, overseeing the airport's transition from being second in rank to Oslo Airport, Fornebu into becoming the main airport of Norway. In addition, he is a member of the board of Flytoget AS.

When Randi Flesland quit her job as CEO of Avinor in December 2005, Nilsen became acting CEO. In April the next year, Sverre Quale took over on a permanent basis.

Nilsen took over as acting CEO again in November 2010. In January 2011 he was replaced by Dag Falk-Petersen.

Business positions
Preceded by Randi Flesland	CEO of Avinor; 2005–2006 (acting)	Succeeded by Sverre Quale
Preceded by Sverre Quale	CEO of Avinor; 2010–2011 (acting)	Succeeded by Dag Falk-Petersen
