= Sigurd Willoch =

Norwegian art historian

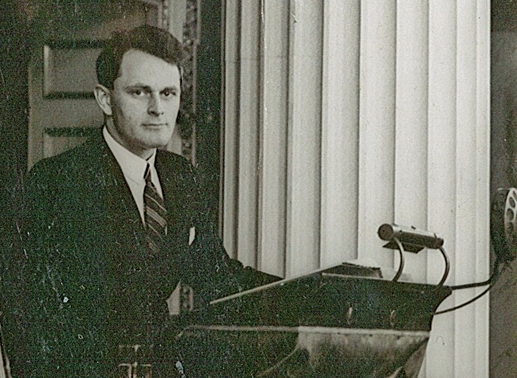
Sigurd in the 1930s

Sigurd Daniel Isaachsen Willoch (16 May 1903 - 20 March 1991) was a Norwegian art historian and director of the National Gallery of Norway.

== Biography ==
He was born in Oslo, Norway. He was the son of Eivind Isaachsen Willoch (1866–1926) and Marie Wenneberg (1873–1951). He was the grandson of painter Olaf Isaachsen. He was a second cousin of both national aviation director Erik Isaachsen Willoch and Norwegian Prime Minister 1981–1986 Kåre Isaachsen Willoch.

Sigurd Willoch took the mag.art. degree in 1925 from the University of Kristiania. He worked as a research fellow from 1928 to 1933, taking the doctorate in 1932. He was the art critic for the newspapers Aftenposten from 1935 to 1942 and Morgenbladet 1945–46.

Willoch wrote about 19th century Norwegian art and artists, including works on Olaf Isaachsen, Edvard Munch, Hugo Lous Mohr (1889–1970), August Cappelen (1827–1852) and Thomas Fearnley (1802–1842). He also wrote about the Art Society in Oslo and the National Gallery of Norway.

He was employed as a curator at Akershus Castle in 1937 and held this position until he took over as director of the National Gallery of Norway in 1946. He was the director of the National Gallery from 1946 to 1973 and on its board from 1952–1976. He represented Norway in the Scandinavian Museum Association, Comité International d'Histoire de l'Art (CIHA), and International Council of Museums.

== Honors ==
He was made a member of the Norwegian Academy of Science and Letters in 1939 and was made a Knight First Class of the Royal Norwegian Order of St. Olav in 1973.

== Selected bibliography ==
This is a list of his most notable works:

- Olaf Isaachsen. En overgangsskikkelse i norsk malerkunst (1926)
- August Cappelen og den romantiske landskapskunst (1928)
- Maleren Thomas Fearnley (1932)
- Kunstforeningen i Oslo 1836-1936 (1936)
- Nasjonalgalleriet gjennem hundre år (1937)
- Edvard Munchs raderinger (1950)
