= Dakota Norway =

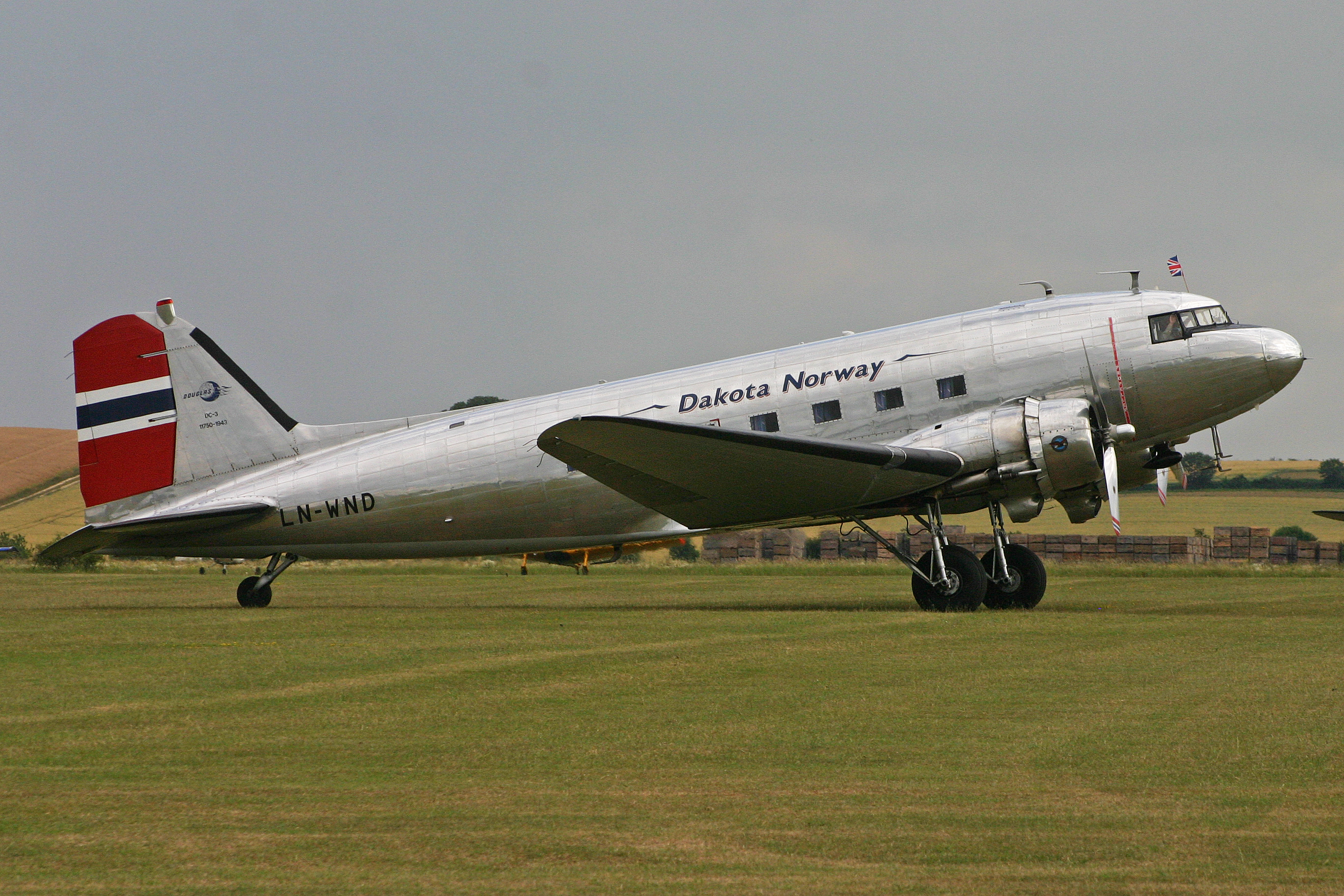
- Dakota Norway in 2011

General information
- Other name(s): "Little Egypt"
- Type: Military transport aircraft
- Manufacturer: Douglas Aircraft Company
- Owners: Stiftelsen Dakota Norway
- Construction number: 1189
- Registration: LN-WND (current)
- Serial: 42-68823 (U.S. Air Force)
- Total hours: 3,215 (as of 1983)

History
- Manufactured: 1942/1943
- In service: 1943-48 (U.S. Air Force); 1948-1969 (Finnair); 1960-1984 (Finnish Air Force)
- Preserved at: Sandefjord Airport Torp

Dakota Norway is a Norwegian nonprofit foundation, which operates and owns Norway's only Douglas C-53D Skytrooper, a military version of the Douglas DC-3 based at Sandefjord Airport in Vestfold County. It is Norway's only flying veteran passenger aircraft.

The plane was taken out of operation on 12 January 1983 after a total flight time of 3,215 hours. It is housed at Sandefjord Airport Torp where it is stored with a Republic F-84 Thunderjet and a North American F-86D Sabre. It has construction number 1189 and was given two RCAF serial numbers: 12889 and later 104889. The tail number is 889.

Tours on board the plane for flights around Vestfold are available during the summer.

== History ==
The aircraft was first in service for the U.S. Air Force in 1943, but was purchased by Finland in 1948 and utilized by Finnair until 1969. Thore Virik and Arne Karlsen of Sandefjord purchased the aircraft from the Finnish Air Force in 1985. Prior to the purchase, it had served as Urho Kekkonen's private aircraft during his time in office as president of Finland.

Constructed in 1942, the vintage veteran airplane can be rented for domestic or international flights during summer.

It has flown regular flights in Vestfold County since August 1986.
