= Randi Flesland =

Norwegian civil servant (born 1955)

Randi Runa Svenkerud Flesland
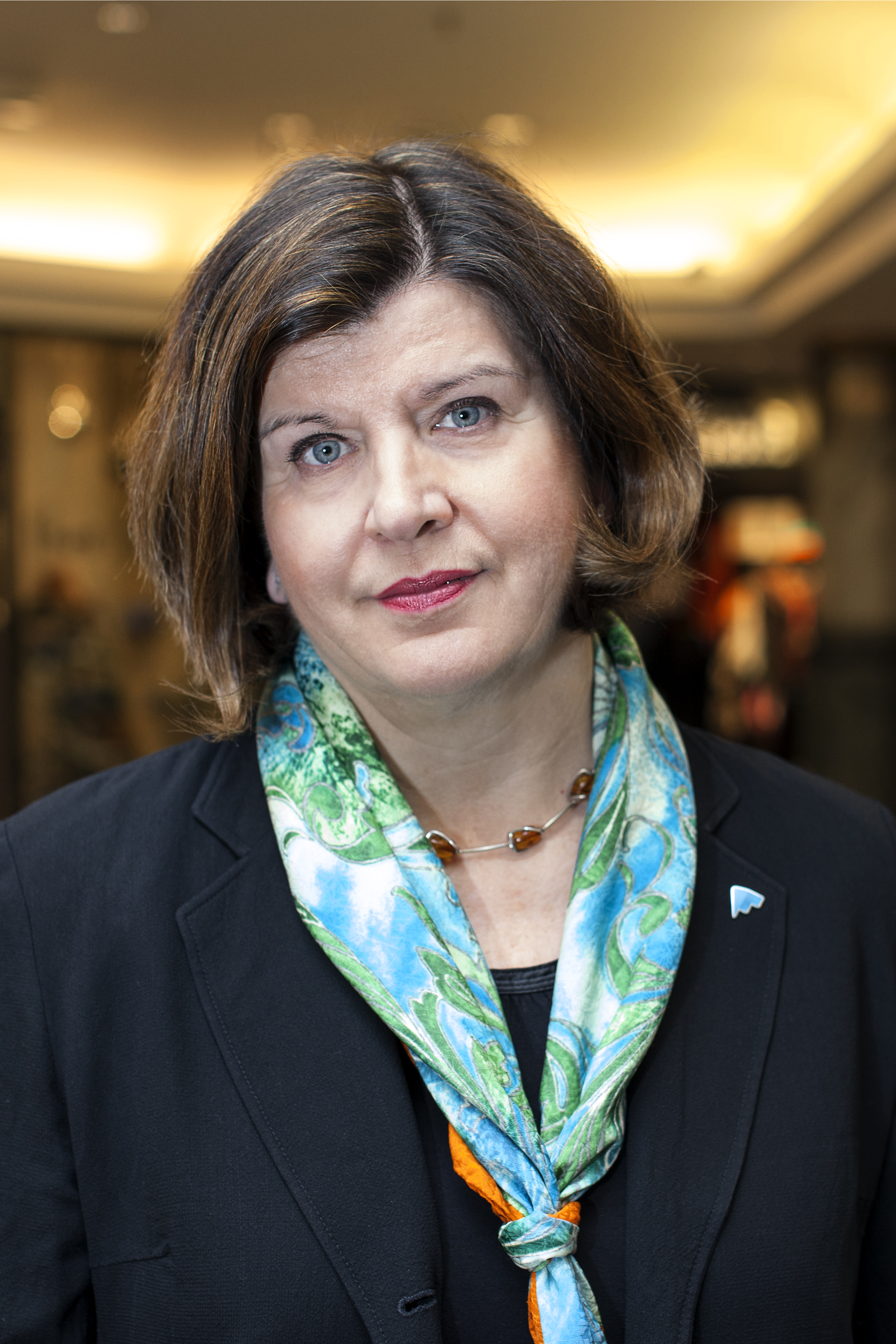
- Flesland in March 2013
- Born: 17 November 1955 (age 70); Oslo, Norway
- Occupation: Civil servant

Randi Runa Svenkerud Flesland (born 17 November 1955 in Oslo) is a Norwegian civil servant.

Flesland was educated at Trinity College, Dublin, with education in economics, with addition of psychology and pedagogy in the universities of Oslo and Davis, California. She had several leading positions in Norges Statsbaner, for 17 years until 2000, such as head of Intercity, Financial director and finally deputy CEO. She then became director of the Norwegian National Airport Administration; later the agency became Avinor. She was in charge of a substantial restructurering of work processes and increased efficiency in order to make financial room for large safety investments. She resigned December 2005 after a long conflict of interests with the trade unions for traffic controllers. She was instead hired in IBM. In 2008, she became the new director of the Norwegian Consumer Council. She has also held several executive board positions, mostly within transport and public health.

She shares the name Flesland with Norway's second largest airport.

Civic offices
Preceded by Osmund Ueland	President of Norges Statsbaner (acting); 2000	Succeeded by Arne Wam (acting)
Preceded by Ove Liavaag	President of Avinor; 2000–2005	Succeeded by Nic. Nilsen (acting)
Preceded by Erik Lund-Isaksen	Director of the Norwegian Consumer Council; 2008–2019	Succeeded by Inger Lise Blyverket
