= Nordic Air =

Norwegian airline, 1970–1973

- Founded: 1970
- Ceased operations: 1973
- Operating bases: Sandefjord Airport, Torp
- Fleet size: 2

Nordic Air A/S was a Norwegian cargo airline based at Sandefjord Airport, Torp. It operated from 1970 to 1973 with a Douglas DC-4, later replaced with two Lockheed L-188 Electra. The airline was not allowed to fly scheduled routes, and relied on charter flights. The most common transport was fish, from Northern Norway, Iceland and the Faroe Islands. The company was bought and merged into Fred Olsen Air Transport in 1973, after Nordic Air had failed to receive permission for its Nordic Express scheduled flights.

== History ==
The airline was started by the brothers Arne and Einar Karlsen from Stokke. They had interests in Vestfold Industrier, and wanted to expand into air cargo. They business idea was to transport fresh fish from Northern Norway to Southern Norway and onwards to Europe. Thore Virik was hired as chief pilot. He and Chief Salesman Jan Larsen also had an ownership in Nordic Air. The company built a hangar at Sandefjord Airport, Torp and bought a Douglas DC-4 Skymaster, with registration LN-MOB and named Moby. The company applied for a concession to start regular flights, but were denied this by the Norwegian Ministry of Transport and Communications. Instead, they were forced to only make ad hoc flights. The first years, the airline mainly flew fish from Northern Norway as well as from Iceland and the Faroe Islands. In addition to fish, cargo was horses, cattle and other animals.

In 1972, the airline replaced its Skymaster with a Lockheed L-188 Electra. The company attempted again to apply for concession, based on a concept that would be called Nordic Express. This was rejected; the ministry stated that the cargo services provided by Scandinavian Airlines System, Braathens SAFE and Widerøe on their passenger planes was sufficient for the domestic market. In 1973, the airline was sold to Fred Olsen Air Transport, which was based at Oslo Airport, Fornebu. Nordic Air was the only cargo airline to operate a base at Sandefjord Airport, Torp.

== Fleet ==
Aircraft	Quantity	First in	Last out
Douglas DC-4 Skymaster	1	1970	1972
Lockheed L-188 Electra	2	1972	1973
