= Inger Lise Blyverket =

Norwegian civil servant (born 1969)

Video interview of Blyverket, 2019.

Inger Lise Blyverket (born 2 March 1969) is a Norwegian civil servant, and director-general of the Norwegian Consumer Council.

She hails from Groruddalen in Oslo. In the early 20s she discovered being lesbian, and subsequently became deputy leader of the National Association for Lesbians, Gays, Bisexuals and Transgender People (now the Norwegian Organisation for Sexual and Gender Diversity). After completing her teacher education she worked as a lower secondary school teacher, before she became a teachers' trade unionist in the Union of Education. She then became director of negotiations in the employers' association Enterprise Federation of Norway. In 2019, she became the director-general of the Norwegian Consumer Council.

| Preceded by Randi Flesland | Director of the Norwegian Consumer Council; 2019– | Incumbent |
