= Fred. Olsen Airtransport =

Norwegian airline

Fred. Olsen Air Transport
IATA	ICAO	Call sign
FO	FOF	FREDOLSEN
- Founded: 16 October 1946
- Commenced operations: 7 November 1946
- Ceased operations: 1997
- Operating bases: Oslo Airport, Fornebu
- Parent company: Fred. Olsen & Co. through Ganger Rolf and Bonheur
- Headquarters: Fornebu, Bærum Municipality, Norway

A/S Fred. Olsens Flyselskap (FOF), trading internationally as Fred. Olsen Airtransport, was a Norwegian charter airline which operated between 1946 and 1997, largely operating cargo aircraft. Based at Oslo Airport, Fornebu, it was created as a spin-off of Norwegian Air Lines and was part of Fred. Olsen & Co., which owned it through its subsidiaries Ganger Rolf and Bonheur.

The airline commenced operations with Douglas C-47 aircraft, operating out of Fornebu and Copenhagen Airport. It introduced a Douglas DC-4, Vickers Viscounts and Curtiss C-46 Commandos during the mid-1950s. These were in part superseded by the Douglas DC-6 during the 1960s and finally the Lockheed L-188 Electra from the mid-1970s. A major customer was Scandinavian Airlines System (SAS), for whom Fred. Olsen operated most of the night cargo flights.

Fred. Olsen had a significant business in corporate jets between 1967 and 1978, using four Dassault Falcon 20s. It held a contract with the Civil Aviation Administration to operate its calibration aircraft, from 1967 a Convair CV-340, from 1976 a Hawker Siddeley HS 748 and from 1996 a de Havilland Canada Dash 8. The airline ceased operations in 1997. It suffered four write-off accidents, including the fatal Drangedal Accident in 1952.

== History ==
=== Norwegian Air Lines ===
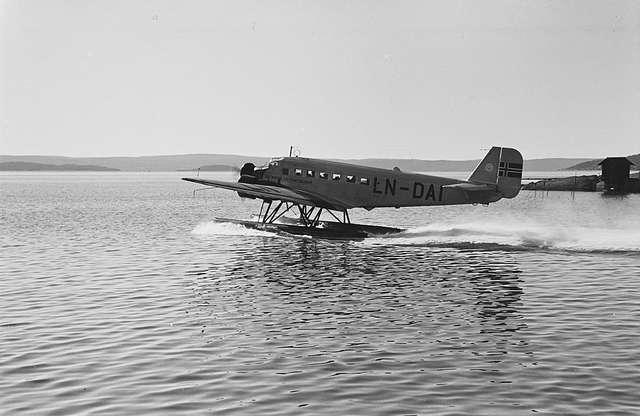
A Junkers Ju 52 taking off at Oslo Airport, Fornebu in 1939

Fred. Olsen & Co., owned by the brothers Thomas Fredrik Olsen and Rudolf Olsen, announced their plans to establish a national airline for Norway in 1933. Founded on 16 October, Norwegian Air Lines was owned by Thomas Olsen, Rudolf Olsen, Johan L. Müller, Ganger Rolf and Bonheur—all within the Fred. Olsen sphere. Named Det Norske Luftfartselskap Fred. Olsen A/S, it hired Hjalmar Riiser-Larsen—since 1921 director of the Civil Aviation Council—as managing director. The company lay plans for both domestic and international routes, which required government concessions with which it had to compete with Widerøe to receive. Fred. Olsen wanted a partner for DNL, in part to strengthen its geographic spread, and meetings were held between Olsen family and Falck to introduce the Bergen-based company as a partner in DNL. On 7 November 1934, Bergenske Dampskibsselskab (BDS) became a partner in DNL, and the company renamed Det Norske Luftfartselskap Fred. Olsen og Bergenske A/S. The dispute with Widerøe was resolved by DNL buying the former, leaving Fred. Olsen with a forty-percent stake in the new company.

On 16 March 1935 the newly appointed Labor Nygaardsvold's Cabinet decided that construction of airports was to be accelerated in order to stimulate the economy. Hence DNL was granted concessions for a coastal route north to Tromsø and an international route from Oslo via Kristiansand to Amsterdam. Grants from both the government and Norway Post were awarded. DNL decided to purchase a three-engine Junkers W 34. It was registered as LN-DAB on 1 June 1935 and named Ternen. Riiser-Larsen and Bernt Balchen were hired to manage the company, while marketing and sales was carried out by Fred. Olsen. The airline's main base was located at Gressholmen Airport in Oslo. A Sikorsky S-43 flying boat was bought after an initial agreement was made to cooperate on transatlantic flights in cooperation with Pan American Airways, but the deal fell through. Additional routes were established the following year.

After the German invasion of Norway on 9 April 1940, all international routes and operations in Southern Norway were terminated. Two aircraft were requisitioned by the German forces and sent to Germany. A limited service was kept in Northern Norway during the resistance, but also these were terminated after the German forces took control of the whole country in early 1940. Most of DNL's pilots fled to the United Kingdom to support the Allied forces.

=== Spin-off ===
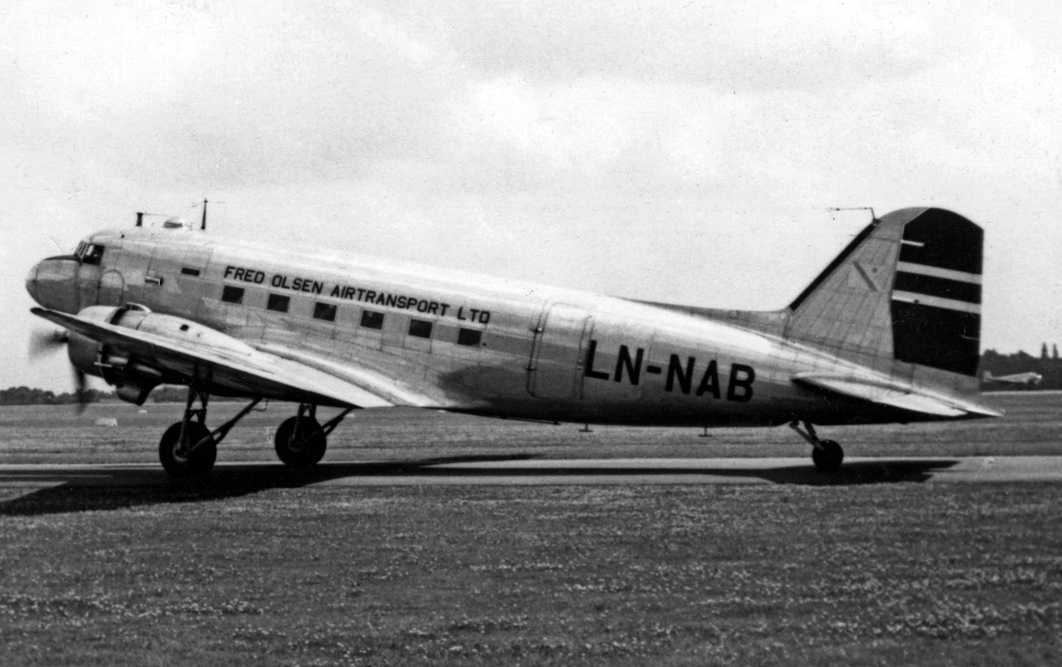
Fred Olsen Airtransport Douglas C-47A operating a ships crew charter to Manchester Airport in 1950

During the war the Norwegian Aviation Board had been established with a combination of public and private representatives. Following liberation in May 1945, negotiations started concerning the re-establishment of civilian aviation, where Thomas Olsen participated. These lasted until early 1946 and concluded with that Norway should establish a national airline. This airline took over the DNL brand and had Balchen as its CEO. Rudolf Olsen retained of the legal successor of DNL, which was named Fre. Olsen Air Transport. The company was formerly incorporated on 16 October 1945, and was the entirety of its existence owned as joint venture between Ganger Rolf and Bonheur.

FOF immediately took orders for three former military Douglas C-47 (DC-3) from the United States, stationed in Scotland. One was immediately flown to Norway, arriving on 24 June 1946, while the other two were overhauled in Scotland and were delivered in July and August. The first aircraft was overhauled by Hønningstad & Co. at Fornebu. The Royal Air Force pilot who had flown over the aircraft was hired as FOF's first pilot. There were shortages in all materials and the airline also used considerable energy establishing a network of agents abroad. Rudolf Olsen became the company's first director. The first commercial flight took off on 7 November heading for Colombo with a part for a ship's engine operated by Wilh. Wilhelmsen. International assistance was secured through an agreement with the British Overseas Airways Corporation. Flight time was forty-one hours and cost NOK 4 per kilometer (NOK 6 per mile).

The second aircraft entered service in November and the third in early 1947. FOF and DNL started an operations cooperation in early 1947, but this lasted for only a year, when FOF withdrew and DNL shifted to cooperate in the Scandinavian Airlines System. Since FOF focused exclusively on the passenger and freight charter market. In April and May 1952 the airline experienced two write-off incidents, causing a shortage of aircraft and crew, resulting in the purchase of another DC-3 and a Douglas DC-4. The latter only remained in use for two years. The airline also bought a helicopter, a Hiller 360, bought in 1954 which crashed on its inaugural flight. It was registered as LN-FOG, and since all of the airline's registration codes started with FO.

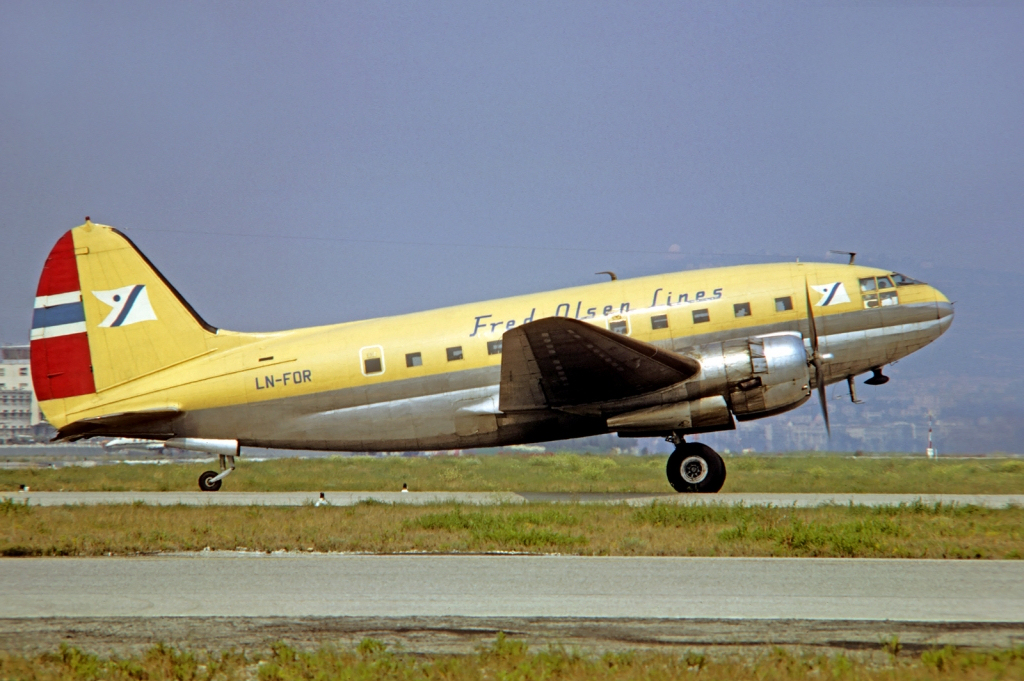
Curtiss C-46 Commando in 1970

=== Viscounts and Commandos ===
In addition to Fornebu, FOF established a base at Copenhagen Airport, which was especially important for cargo operations. The airline took order of two Vickers Viscounts in 1955, thus becoming the first Norwegian operator of turboprop aircraft. They were intended for international scheduled flights, but the government disregarded that applications and the aircraft were instead leased to British European Airways. Fred. Olsen Aircraft Maintenance (FOAM) was established at Fornebu in 1955. It was a continuation of FOF's technical division, but was also to carry out maintenance for other airlines. The Viscounts were sold in 1957, but four more were ordered and delivered in April and August the same year.

The Viscounts were supplemented with three Curtiss C-46 Commandos in 1957, which were first overhauled in Italy. This allowed all but one C-47 to be sold. The Curtisses were predominantly used in the cargo market, and common operation was the hauling of flowers to Norway. Two of the aircraft were wet leased to SAS from 1959 to operate their freight flights. The Viscounts were largely reserved for passenger charter, and most commonly leased to Air France and SAS. The latter used them regularly on their flights to Northern Norway and painted some of the aircraft in their livery. They were also commonly used on charter flights to Svalbard.

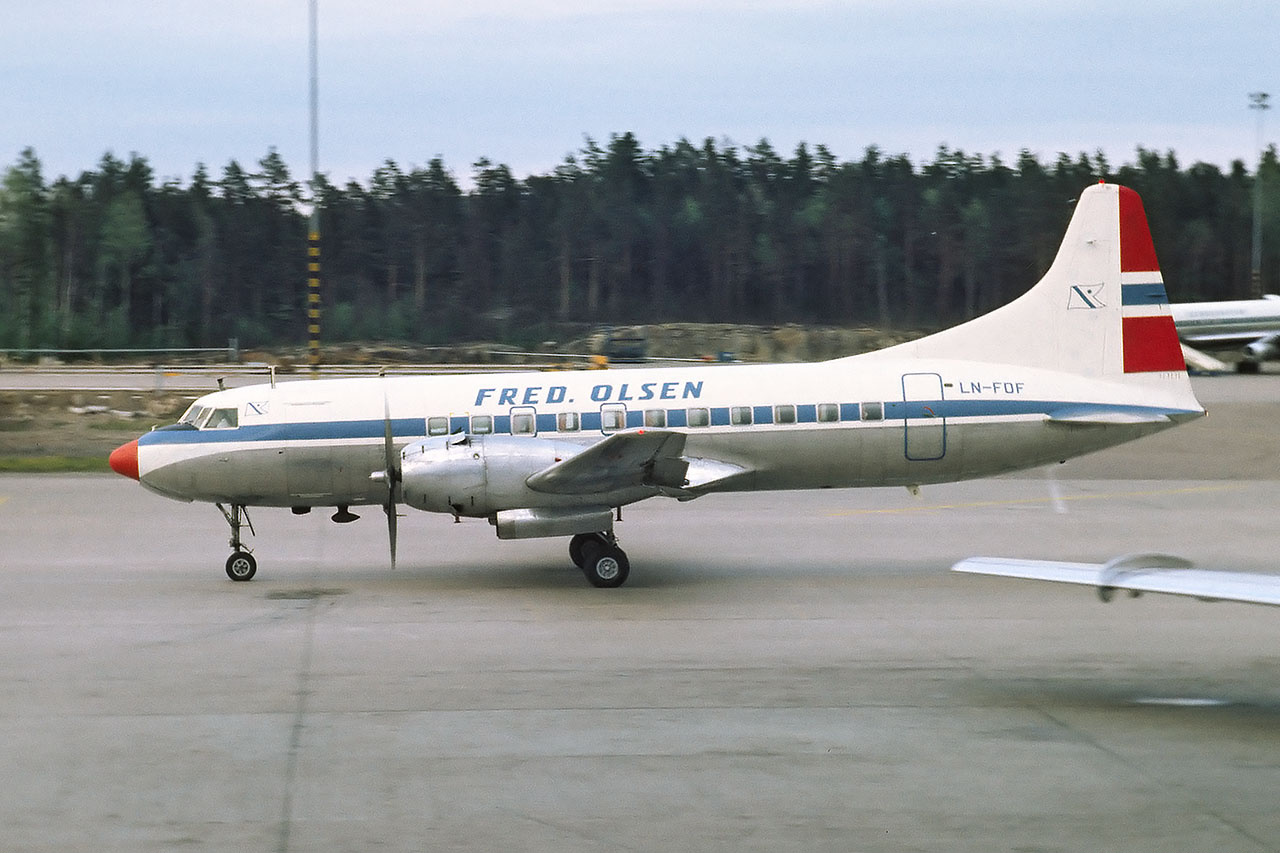
Convair 340 at Stockholm Arlanda Airport in 1970

Fred. Olsen leased their Viscounts to Austrian Airlines when it was established in 1958. The wet leases ended in April 1960, when Austrian received its own Viscounts. The charter market for the size of aircraft was limited and they were sold to Indian Airlines in January 1962. This was a significant downsizing in the airline, resulting in a series of lay-offs. FOAM was liquidated in 1962, with some employees being transferred to FOF and a large number going to Kenya, where there was a lot of need for aviation personnel because of the Shifta War. The last C-47 was sold in 1961. Heavy maintenance was thereafter subcontracted to SAS for the Curtisses.

To capitalize on the growing European freight market, Fred. Olsen bought a cargo-only Douglas DC-6 in 1965. Its capacity of 13 tonnes cargo was twice that of the Curtiss, and the aircraft was wet-leased to SAS to use on its European cargo routes. Two additional DC-6s were bought in 1967, allowing Fred. Olsen to take over all cargo flights in the SAS system. During the Biafran airlift of the Nigerian Civil War, which commenced in 1968, Fred. Olsen was contracted by Joint Church Aid to operate aid flights out of São Tomé to Uli. Initially two Curtisses were used, but later a DC-6, painted in Joitn Church Aid livery, was contracted. FOF built up a full operational base at São Tomé International Airport. This resulted in the aircraft being bombed in November 1969. Thus a new DC-6 was sent down. The Curtisses were sold in 1971.

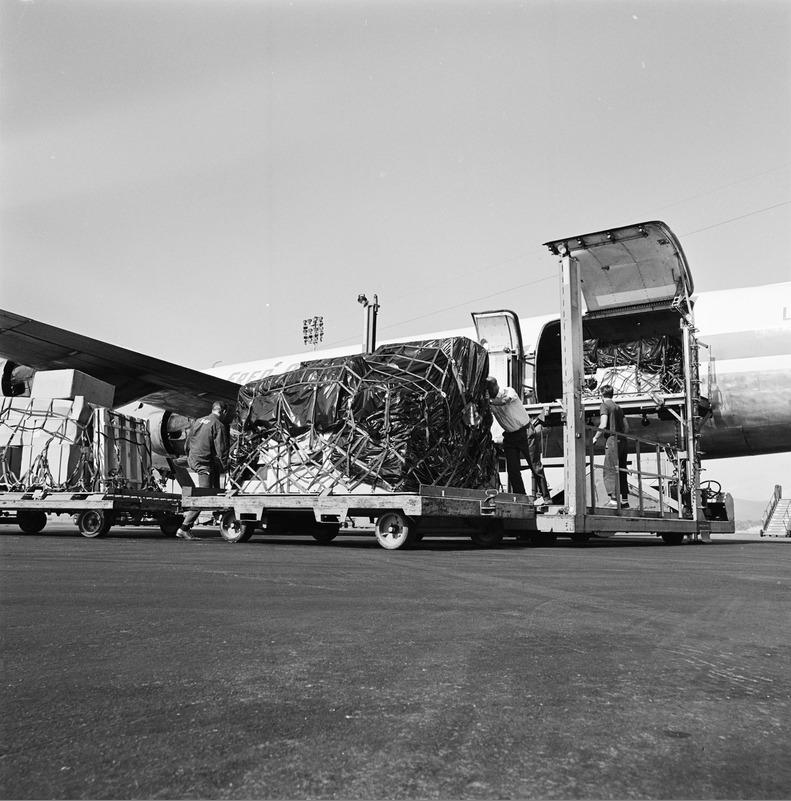
Loading a Douglas DC-6 at Fornebu in 1970

FOF established a heavy technical division in 1966. A hangar was bought at Fornebu and in 1969 it was expanded to allow room for the DC-6 and allowed all the company's facilities at Fornebu to be located at one place. The division was approved as an authorized aircraft maintenance facility in 1972, allowing it to carry out subcontracted work for other airlines and also on the Lockheed P-3 Orion and Lockheed C-130 Hercules for the Royal Norwegian Air Force. The airline bought a Convair CV-340 in 1968. It was intended to be used both for runway calibration on contract with the Civil Aviation Administration and for freight charter. However, with the construction of the regional airport network, the aircraft was constantly occupied with calibration runs. It was later subcontracted to Widerøe, which used it on the route connecting Bodø Airport, Bardufoss Airport, Tromsø Airport and Andøya Airport, Andenes.

=== Falcons and Electras ===
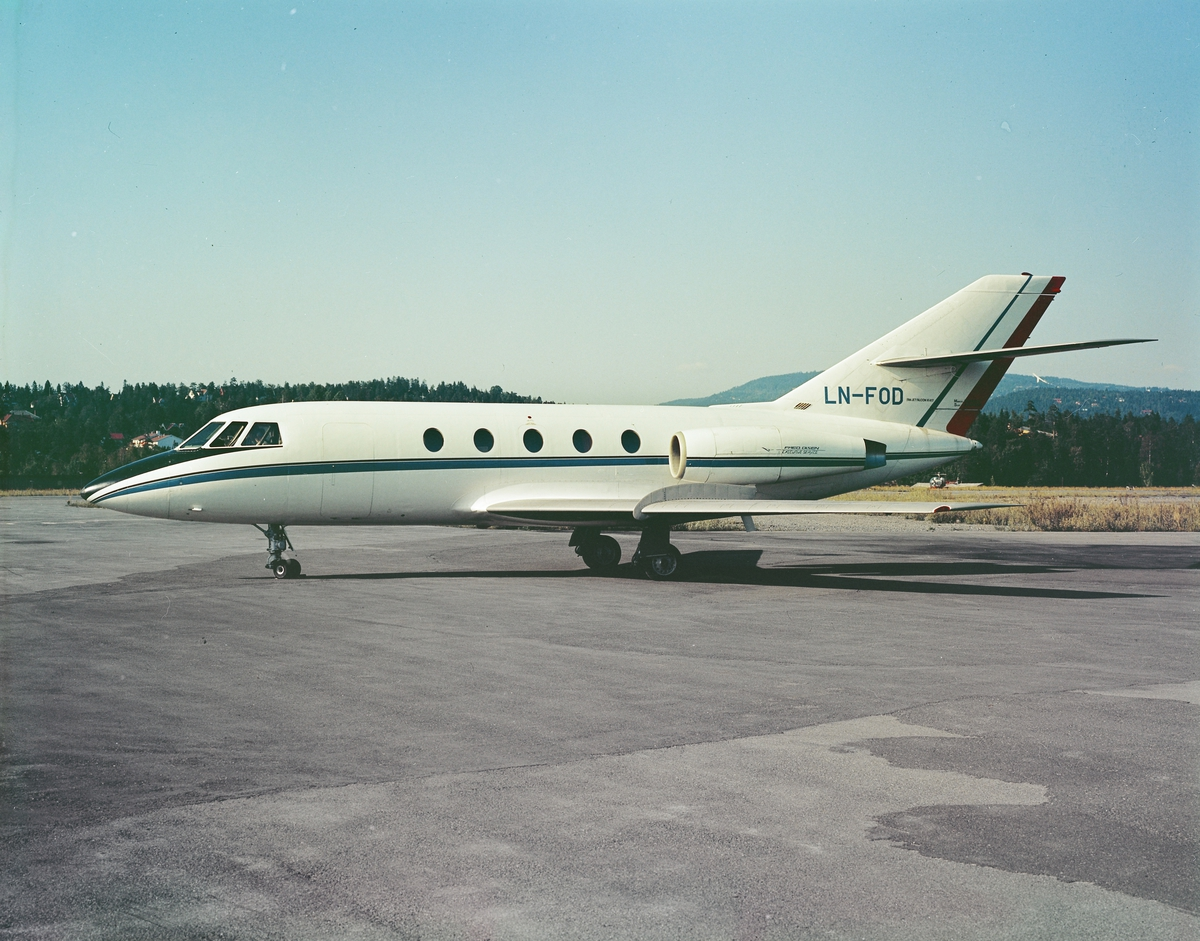
Dassault Falcon 20 at Oslo Airport, Fornebu in 1970

Fred. Olsen entered the jet age with the delivery of its first Dassault Falcon 20 in 1967 and the establishment of the brand Fred. Olsen Executive Service. The ten-seat corporate jet was mostly used for corporate executive charters and as an air ambulance service from Southern Europe to Scandinavia. FOF operated a peak four Falcons. The first two Lockheed L-188 Electras were produced in 1973, when Fred. Olsen bought Nordic Air. One more was bought the following year. These took over all regular cargo services, and the DC-6 aircraft were degraded to the spot charter market. The last DC-6 was sold in 1977, leaving Fred. Olsen with only Electras in their cargo fleet.

The Convair was sold in 1976 and replaced by a used Hawker Siddeley HS 748 from Varig which was dedicated for navaid flight inspection and calibration for the CAA. The Falcons were sold to the RNoAF, the last being handed over in 1978, although FOF retained a contract to conduct heavy maintenance on them. The Electras were mostly used for charter flights for SAS, although they were also used to an extent on charter flights, particularly hauling of flowers from Genova and flights to Greenland. SAS gradually established its own network of cargo routes, reducing the amount subcontracted to Fred. Olsen. In the end SAS launched the Air de Cologne (AdC) concept, and one of Fred. Olsen's aircraft were painted in the black livery. SAS discontinued its freight-only flights in 1988, and FOS lost most of its business. AdC was sold to TNT, and FOF was able to secure freight contracts with it and KLM.

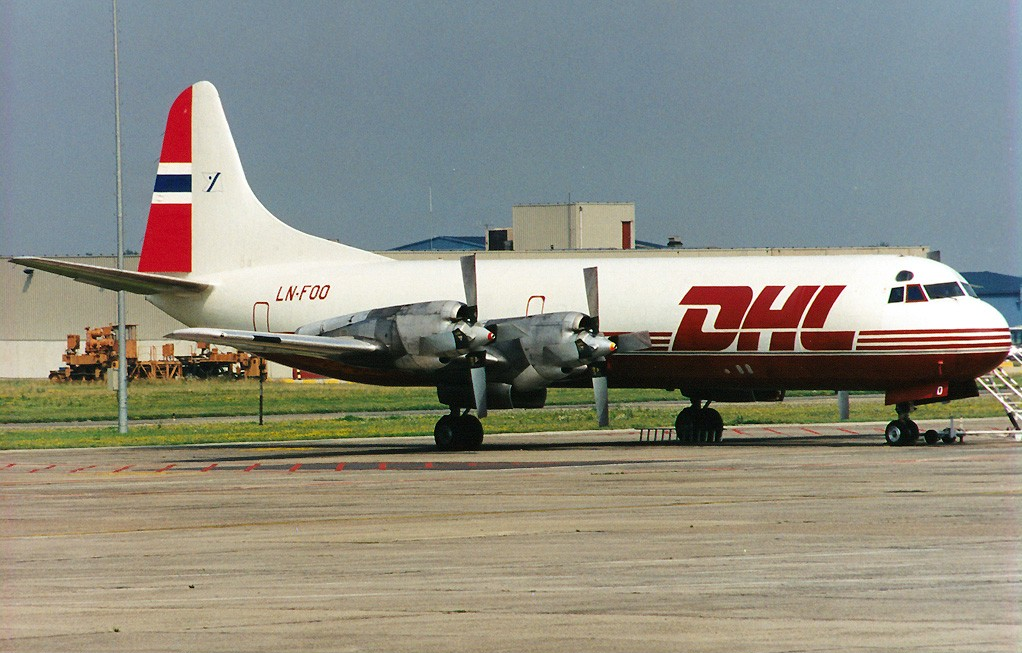
A Lockheed L-188 Electra in DHL livery in 1996

The airline soon signed a contract with DHL, with most of these flights being based out of Brussels Airport. This increased the business sufficiently that Fred. Olsen took delivery of a fourth Electra in 1991. By 1996 the company was operating six Electras. Fred. Olsen was responsible for the maintenance of the Partnair Convair 580 which crashed as Partnair Flight 394 on 8 September 1989. Despite that the accident was caused by fraudulent aircraft parts, no-one was charged with criminal offenses.

Since the inaugural calibration flights started, the CAA had awarded the operation and maintenance contracts to FOF without tenders. By 1993 the annual costs were 15 million Norwegian krone (NOK). In September 1993 the CAA announced that it would retire the Hawker Siddeley and that it was considering procuring a Dornier 328, de Havilland Canada Dash 8 or ATR 42. A deal was struck in February 1994, where Fred. Olsen, through its controlling post in Widerøe, was able to secure that the CAA could purchase a Dash 8 at a discounted price of NOK 78 million by utilizing one of Widerøe's options. In exchange the CAA signed the maintenance contract with FOF. The introduction of the Dash 8 reduced the hourly operating cost from NOK 23,000 to 14,000, and was introduced in 1996.

The company announced in February 1997 that it would cease operations. Negotiations had been carried out with the employees for them to take over the company, but this had not been successful. FOF cited the loss of maintenance contracts and difficulties in making a profit in the Central European freight market as reasons for the termination. A contributing factor was the age of the Electras, which could not compete in operating costs with newer aircraft.

== Fleet ==
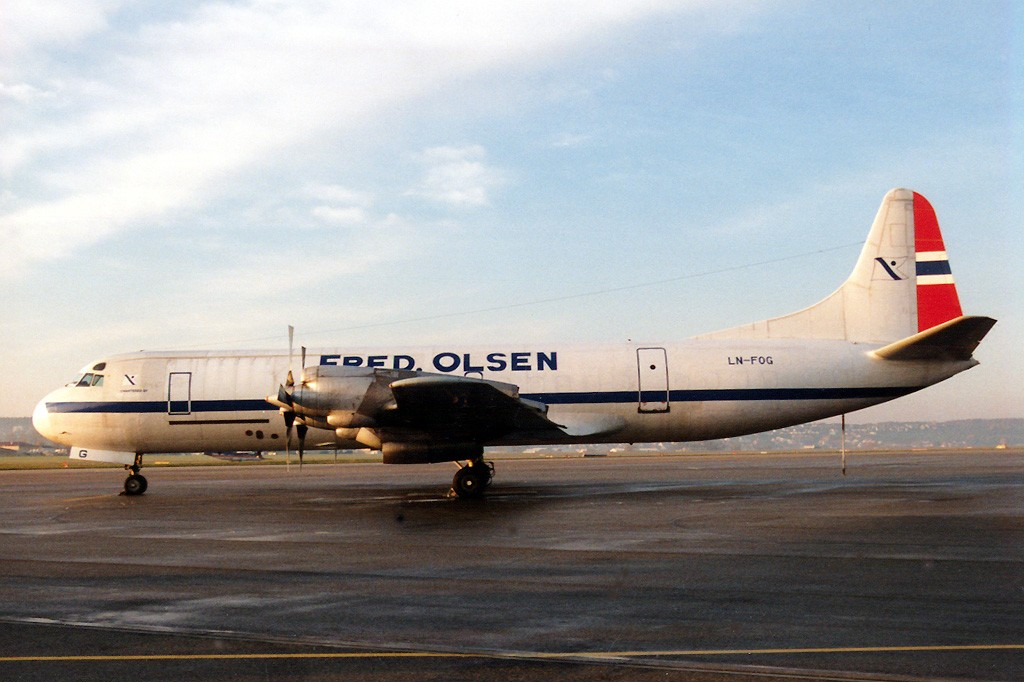
A Lockheed L-188 Electra in 1990

The following is a list of Fred. Olsen Air Transport's fleet of aircraft. It specified the total number of aircraft operated of each type, which may be more than the peak inventory. It also specifies when the first aircraft of a given class entered service and when the last left service. Fred. Olsen has operated a total of thirty aircraft.

List of Fred. Olsen aircraft
Aircraft	Quantity	Start	End	Ref(s)
Douglas C-47 Skytrain	4	1946	1961	
Douglas Douglas DC-4 Skymaster	1	1952	1954	
Hiller UH-12	1	1954	1954	
Vickers Viscount	6	1955	1962	
Curtiss C-46 Commando	3	1957	1971	
Douglas DC-6A	3	1965	1977	
Convair CV-340	1	1968	1976	
Dassault Falcon 20	4	1967	1978	
Lockheed L-188 Electra	6	1973	1997	
Hawker Siddeley HS 748	1	1975	1996	

== Accidents and incidents ==
- The airline's first major incident took place on 2 April 1952, when a Douglas C-47 registration LN-NAE crashed during approach to Bordeaux–Mérignac Airport, France. The aircraft was flying a Norrköping, Sweden-based football team home from Spain when engine trouble and severe weather forced the aircraft down. The aircraft landed on a beach, and although the aircraft was written off, there were no casualties.
- Fred. Olsen suffered its only fatal accident on 5 May 1952, when a Douglas C-47 registration LN-NAD crashed in Drangedal Municipality. The aircraft was carrying Antarctic whalers home to Tønsberg Airport, Jarlsberg. Eleven of the twenty-nine people on board, perished in the accident. The flight attendant was the only crew surviving
- The airline's only helicopter, a Hiller UH-12, crashed on 10 December 1954 in Nore.
- 2 November 1969, During the Biafran airlift a Douglas DC-6 registration LN-FOM was hit by Nigerian bombs during unloading at Uli. Although the aircraft was damaged beyond repair, none of the crew members were seriously hurt.
- Just after take-off from Norwich Airport, England, on 12 December 1973, a Dassault Falcon 20 suffered multiple birdstrikes when it flew through a flock of seagulls. Both engines failed and the aircraft had to carry out an emergency landing in a field some 1,000 meters (3,000 ft) from the end of the runway. The aircraft was written off and the crew of three were injured, although the six passengers were not hurt.
- During calibration inspections at Molde Airport, Årø on 7 March 1984, the HS 748 slid off the runway. No-one was injured in the incident.
