= Daniel Isaachsen (physicist) =

Norwegian physicist (1859–1940)

Daniel Isaachsen (23 June 1859 – 29 March 1940) was a Norwegian physicist.

He was born in London as the son of military officer Isak Tobias Isaachsen and Fredrikke Andrea Rude. He was a great-grandson of Isaach Isaachsen, brother of scientist Haakon Isaachsen and scientist Isak Isaachsen, nephew of painter Olaf Isaachsen and cousin of painter Herman Willoch and naval officer Odd Isaachsen Willoch. In 1861 he married Asta Lie, a daughter of Jonas Lie.

He finished his education in 1877 and graduated from university with the cand.real. degree in 1883. He started his career as an assistant at the International Bureau of Weights and Measures, where he stayed from 1889, interrupted by a period in Berlin from 1886 to 1887. He was hired as a research fellow at the Royal Frederick University in 1889, and from 1891 he worked as a teacher and lecturer. He first worked at Trondhjem Technical School from 1891 to 1893, then at the Norwegian Naval Academy from 1893. He directed the Norwegian Metrology Service from 1914 to 1929.

He was a member of the Norwegian Academy of Science and Letters. He wrote textbooks like Lærebog i fysik for realgymnasiet og tekniske skoler (first time in 1903, from 1909 together with Gabriel Gabrielsen Holtsmark), and popular science books like Elektriciteten: en populær fremstilling from 1897.
