= Ove Liavaag =

Norwegian civil servant (1938–2007)

Ove Liavaag (29 May 1938 - 19 December 2007) was a Norwegian civil servant.

He was the director of the Norwegian Civil Aviation Administration from 1989 to 2000. Prior to this he was technical director of the same organization from 1981. He was a siv. ing. by education.

Business positions
Preceded by Erik Willoch	Director of the Norwegian Civil Aviation Administration; 1989–2000	Succeeded by Randi Flesland
