= Olaf Isaachsen =

Norwegian painter (1835–1893)

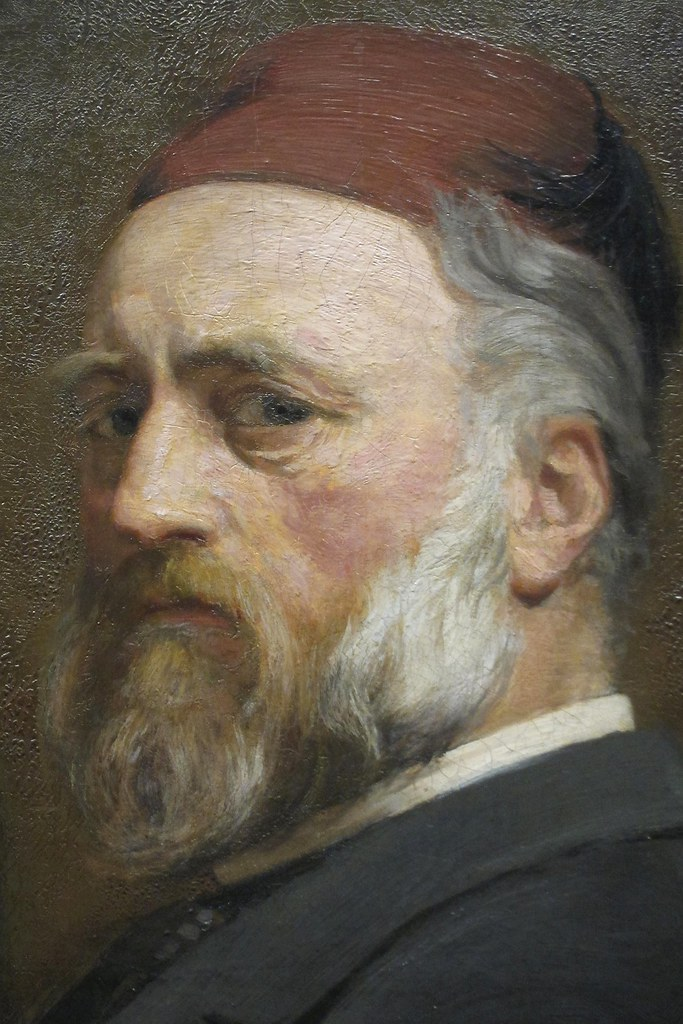
Olaf Isaachsen; portrait by Alfredo Andersen (1888)

Olaf Wilhelm Isaachsen (May 16, 1835 – September 22, 1893) was a Norwegian landscape and genre painter.

== Biography ==
He was born in Mandal in Vest-Agder county Norway. Isaachsen belonged to a branch of an affluent and educated merchant family from Kjos in Kristiansand. He was the son of jurist Daniel Peter Christian Isaachsen, grandson of politician Isaach Isaachsen and great-grandson of Daniel Isaachsen (1744-1813), a Norwegian shipbuilder . He was the uncle of physicist Daniel Isaachsen, scientist Haakon Isaachsen (1867–1936), painter Herman Willoch and naval officer Odd Isaachsen Willoch.

He attended Nissens Latin School in Christiania (now Oslo). He later studied under Joachim Frich and Johannes Flintoe at the Royal School of Drawing from 1850, in Düsseldorf from 1854 to 1859, and in Paris under Thomas Couture (1859-1860) and Gustave Courbet (1861-1862). After a visit to Italy he returned home in 1864 with a view to becoming an artist with a strong focus on archeology and history. He ultimately settled in Kristiansand, although with frequent periods spent abroad.

His artistic style reflected naturalism and in later years impressionism. Isaachsen was regarded as one of Norway's more prominent artists and great colourist with motives of the coast landscape of Southern Norway. He also painted a wide range of portraits. Moreover, he found a full valid artistic expression in Setesdalen. His art often reflected the valley's distinctive culture. He is represented with 24 works in the National Museum in Oslo (NM), former National Gallery of Norway. The Regional Museum in Kristiansand, Sørlandets Kunstmuseum (SKMU) has 58 works.

== Personal life ==
Isaachsen was a knowledgeable and courteous man, a mixture of observation and locals, who spoke fluent German, Dutch, English, French and Italian. He was married in 1864 to Antonie (Toni) John Prehr (1838-1870). The couple had four children – William (1865-1942), Eivind (1866-1926); Johanna Marie (1867-1872) and Harald (1869-1942). His wife died of tuberculosis when only 32 years old. Two years later his four-year-old daughter Johanna Marie died of diphtheria, and he was left with three small boys. He was the paternal grandfather of Sigurd Daniel Isaachsen Willoch, an art historian and director of the National Gallery of Norway.

== Selected works ==
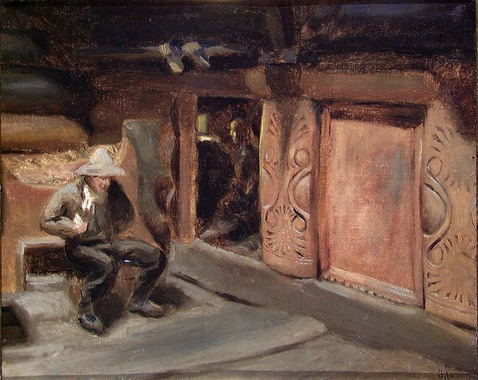
Living Room with Two Doors (1858)

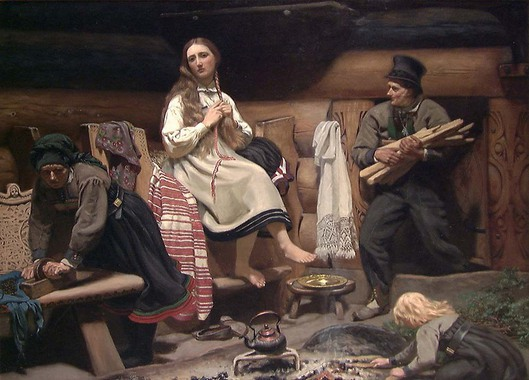
Setesdal Interior (1869)

- En sjørøver, 1858
- Seks akter fra Paris, 1859
- Landskap fra Apeninnene, 1863
- Setesdalsstue, Kveste i Valle, 1866
- Slagsmål i en bondestue, 1866
- Studie av en såret mann, 1866
- Liggende setesdøl, 1866
- Ung setesdøl, 1866
- Slagsbror, 1867
- Et litterært funn, 1870–71
- Bruden pyntes, 1878
- Setesdalsloft, 1878
- Stabbursinteriør fra Ose i Setesdal, 1878
- Stuen i Holskogen, ca. 1880
- Syrinbusk i morgensol, 1881
- Tore Hund ved Olav den helliges lik, 1881
- Venemyr i Søgne Sogn Høststemning, 1885
- Efter badet, 1889
- Kristiansand etter brannen, 1892
- tre brannbilder fra Kristiansand, 1892
