= Daniel Otto Isaachsen =

Norwegian businessperson and politician

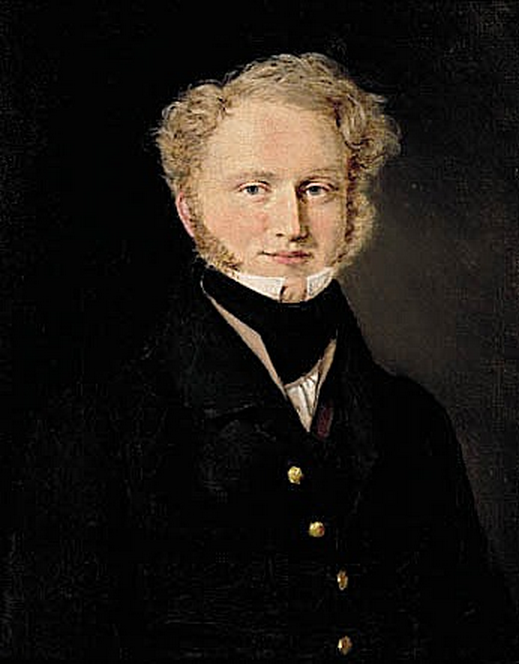
Portrait from 1836 by Christian Albrecht Jensen.

Daniel Otto Christian Isaachsen (22 August 1806 – 9 December 1891) was a Norwegian businessperson and politician.

He was born in 1806 as the son of wealthy businessman Daniel Isaachsen and his second wife Hanne Susanne Nideros. He married a Laura Pedersen. He was the half-brother of Peder and Isaach Isaachsen.

He was elected to the Norwegian Parliament in 1839, representing the constituency of Christianssand. He worked as a businessman and consul there.
