= Herman Willoch =

Norwegian painter (1892–1968)

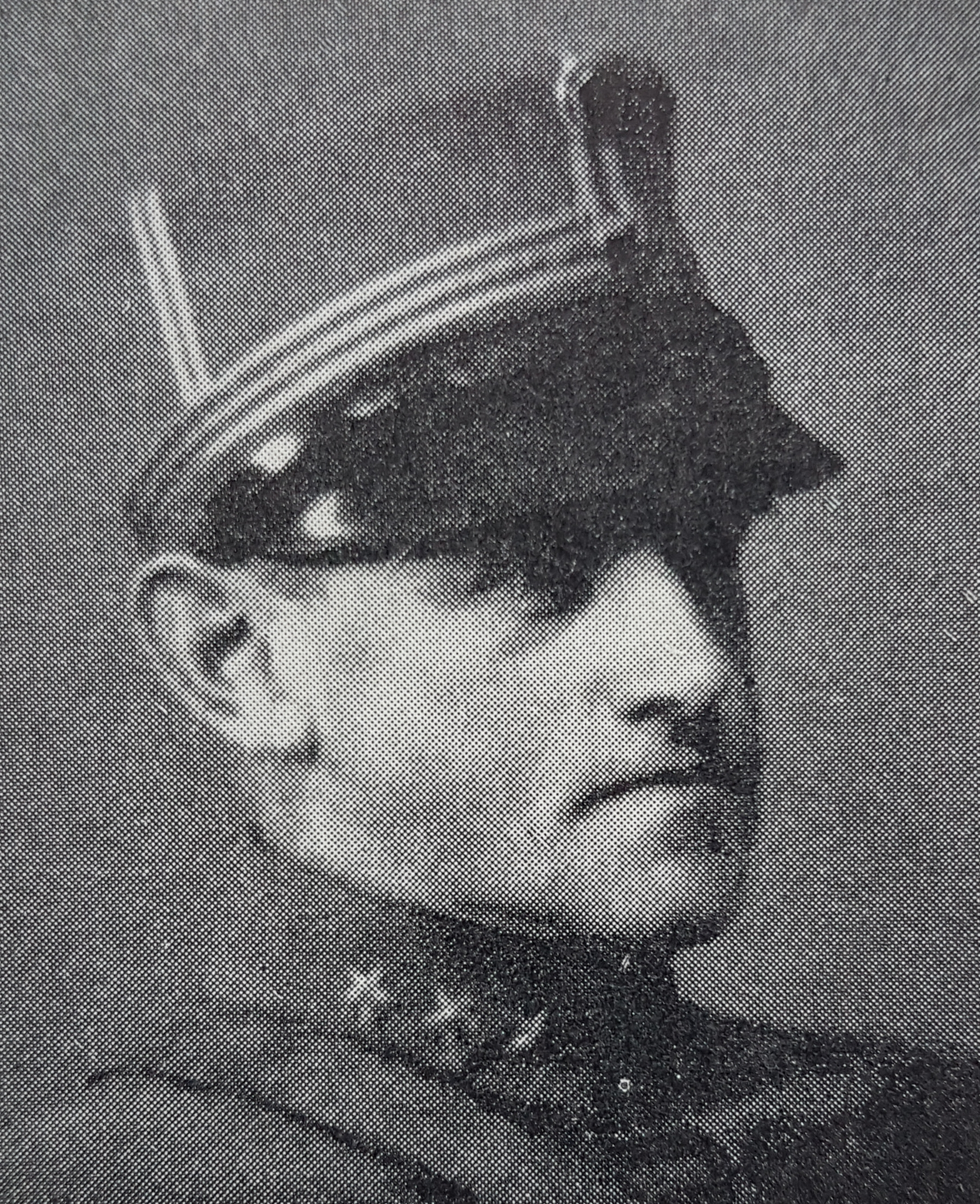
Herman Isaachsen Willoch

Herman Isaachsen Willoch (27 June 1892 – 11 February 1968) was a Norwegian painter.

He was born in Alversund as the son of vicar Christian Abel Isaachsen, a grandson of Isaach Isaachsen. He was the cousin of Odd Isaachsen Willoch. The family eventually moved to Uranienborg, Oslo. He later resided in Bærum.

He studied under Pola Gauguin at the Norwegian National Academy of Fine Arts. He worked mainly with frescoes, decorating the city hall in Sandvika.

He is buried at Vestre gravlund.
