= Erik Willoch =

Erik Willoch (19 December 1922 – 5 August 1991) was a Norwegian jurist and civil servant.

Born in Oslo as a brother of Kåre Willoch, he graduated as cand.jur. in 1948. He worked at the University of Oslo from 1950 to 1956, and then in the Office of the Attorney General of Norway from 1957. He was the director of the Norwegian Civil Aviation Administration from 1964 to 1989.

Business positions
Preceded by Einar Bøe	Director of the Norwegian Civil Aviation Administration; 1964–1989	Succeeded by Ove Liavaag
