= Avinor =

Norwegian state-owned airport operator

Avinor AS
- Type: State owned
- Industry: Airport operator
- Founded: 1 July 1947 (as Luftfartsverket); 1 January 2003 (as Avinor)
- Headquarters: Oslo, Norway,
- Area served: Norway
- Key people: Abraham Foss (CEO); Ola Mørkved Rinnan (Chairman)
- Revenue: ▲NOK 7,871 million (2010)
- Net income: NOK 1745 million (2010)
- Number of employees: 2,400
- Parent: Norwegian Ministry of Transport and Communications
- Website: avinor.no/en

Avinor AS is a state-owned limited company that operates most of the civil airports in Norway. The Norwegian state, via the Norwegian Ministry of Transport and Communications, controls 100 percent of the share capital. Avinor was created on 1 January 2003, by the privatization of the Norwegian Civil Aviation Administration known as Luftfartsverket. Its head office is in Bjørvika, Oslo, located on the seaside of Oslo Central Station.

Avinor owns and operates 44 airports in Norway, fourteen in association with the Royal Norwegian Air Force, and is responsible for air traffic control services in Norway. In addition to the 44 airports, it operates three Area Control Centers: Bodø Air Traffic Control Center, Stavanger Air Traffic Control Center and Oslo ATCC.

As of 2010, the chief executive officer was Sverre Quale who has been in the job since 18 April 2006. He was previously the head of the Norwegian Accident Investigation Board. As of 2011, Sverre Quale has been employed as the CEO at Multiconsult. His replacement, Dag Falk-Petersen, was CEO of CHC Helicopters. In February 2021, Abraham Foss took on the role of CEO of the company. Avinor has about 3000 employees, including air traffic control, air navigation services, rescue, maintenance, administration and other airport operations personnel.

== History ==
On 1 July 1947, the Norwegian Ministry of Transport and Communication created the Aviation Directorate (Luftfartsdirektoratet) to take over the responsibility for the civilian airports in Norway. Until then the Norwegian Ministry of Defence was responsible for operating airports, including the civilian ones. This responsibility had been delegated to the Aviation Council (Luftfartsrådet) within the ministry. The first director was Einar Bøe (1947–1964), followed by Erik Willoch (1964–1989), Ove Liavaag (1989–2000), Randi Flesland (2000–2005), Sverre Quale (2006–2010), Dag Falk-Petersen (2011–2021) and Abraham Foss (2021–).

The organisation changed its name to Luftfartsverket in 1967. In 1997, Oslo Airport, Fornebu and the then under construction Oslo Airport, Gardermoen, were merged into a separate subsidiary, Oslo Lufthavn AS. This company still operates Oslo Airport, Gardermoen. On 14 December 2005, Randi Flesland resigned as CEO after an ongoing dispute with employees. She was temporarily replaced by Nic. Nilsen until Sverre Quale took over.
