= Isaach Isaachsen =

Norwegian politician

Isaach Isaachsen (25 May 1774 – 15 August 1828) was a Norwegian politician.

He was born in 1774 as the son of wealthy businessman Daniel Isaachsen and his first wife Christiane Hedvig Christensen. He married a Hedevig Elisabeth Hansen. He was the brother of Peder and Daniel Otto Isaachsen.

His son Daniel became a jurist. Through him, Isaach Isaachsen was the grandfather of painter Olaf Isaachsen.

He was elected to the Norwegian Parliament in 1818, representing the constituency of Lister og Mandals Amt. He worked as a farmer there. He served only one term.
