= Nationaltheatret station =

Railway station in Oslo, Norway

Nationaltheatret railway Station
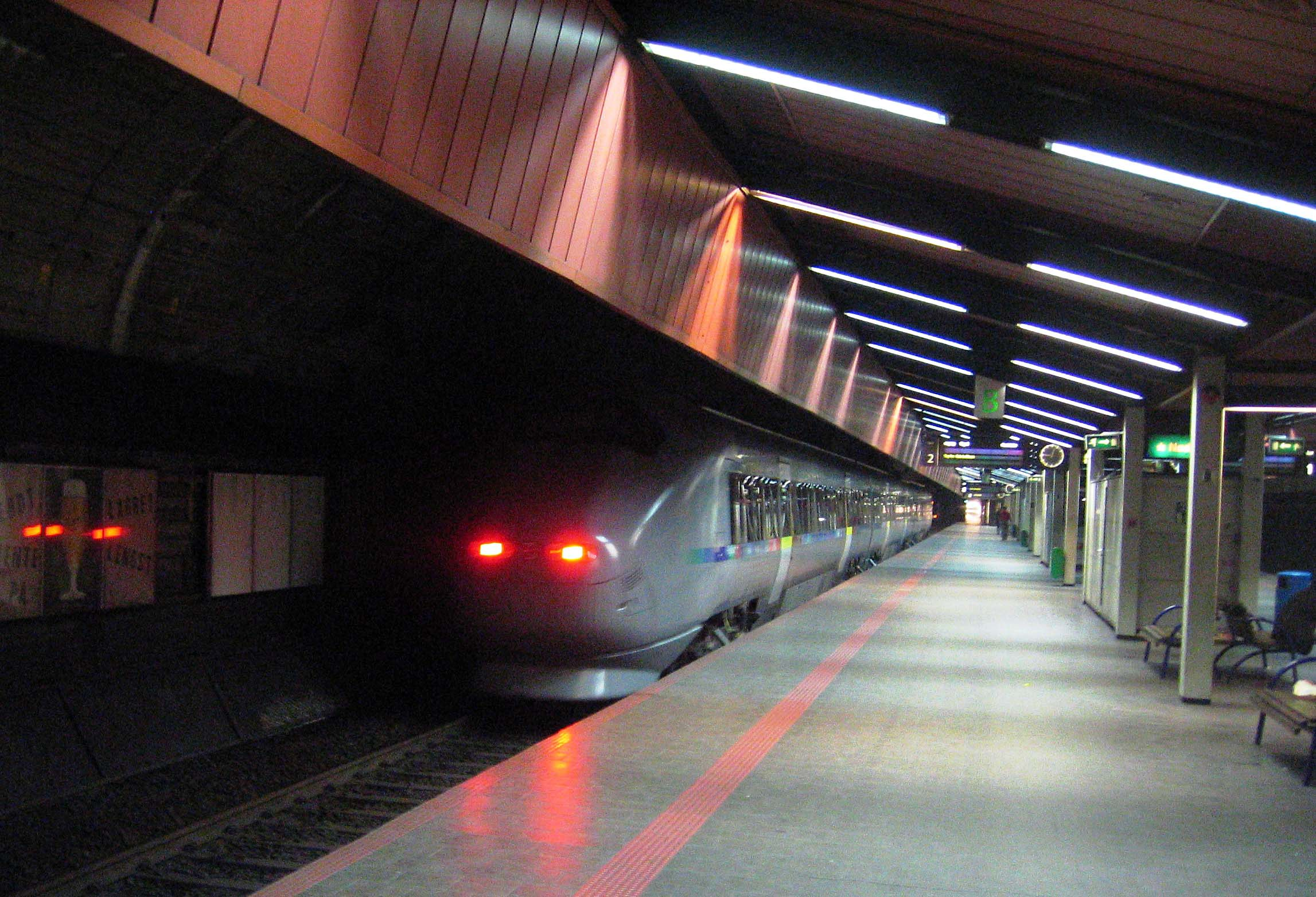
- Class 71 train

General information
- Location: Vika, Sentrum, Oslo; Norway
- Coordinates: 59°54′53″N 10°43′49″E
- Owner
- Operator: Flytoget; Go-Ahead Norge; Vy
- Line: Drammen Line
- Distance: 1.4 km (0.9 mi)
- Platforms: 4
- Connections: Metro: Nationaltheatret T Tram: Bekkestua–Ljabru and Majorstuen–Kjelsås; Bus: 30 Bygdøy–Nydalen; 31 Snarøya — Fornebu — Tonsenhagen — Grorud; 32 Kværnerbyen–Voksen skog 54 Tjuvholmen — Kjelsås Station; 70 Skullerud; 81 (Fornebu) — Filipstad —Myrvoll stasjon 30N Bygdøy — Jernbanetorget; 81N Ski stasjon 83N Fløysbonn; And more….

Other information
- Station code: NTH
- IATA code: ZZN
- Fare zone: Ruter: 1

History
- Opened: 1 June 1980
Location
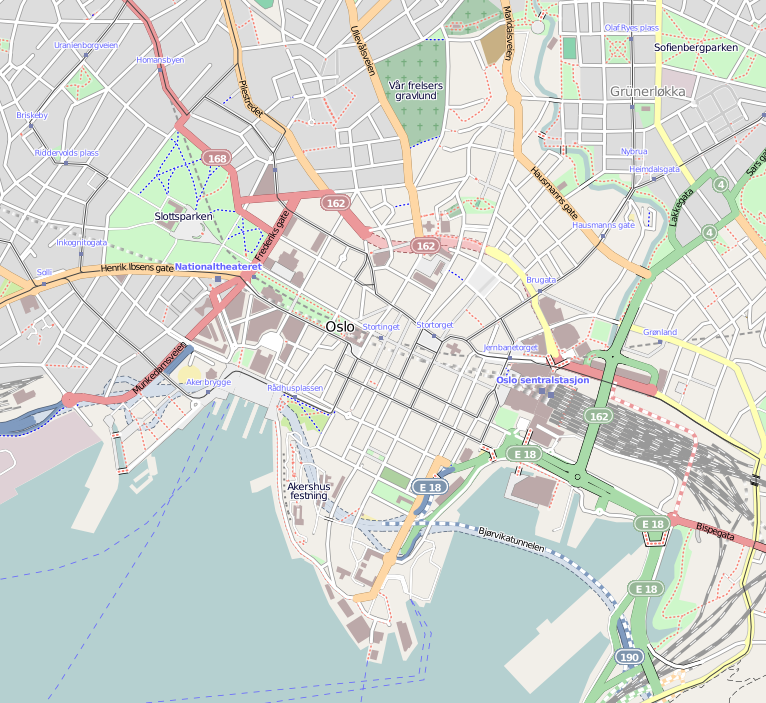
- Location within Central Oslo

Nationaltheatret Station (Norwegian: Nationaltheatret stasjon) is an underground railway station on the Drammen Line serving Vika and the central business district of Oslo, Norway. It is the second-busiest railway station in Norway, behind Oslo Central Station (Oslo S), from which Nationaltheatret is 1.4 kilometers (0.9 mi) away. Owned and operated by Bane NOR, Nationaltheatret serves regional services to the Vestfold Line and the Oslo Commuter Rail operated by Vy, intercity services on the Sørland Line operated by Go-Ahead Norge, and the Airport Express Train.

The station is located below an Oslo Metro station with the same name. At ground level there is transfer to the Oslo Tramway and Ruter buses. Nationaltheatret is along with Holmestrand Station one of two underground mainline railway stations in Norway, and named for the adjacent National Theatre. The station opened as the terminus of Holmenkolbanen's light rail services in 1928. The railway station opened on 1 June 1980 and was upgraded to four tracks in 1999. The older section received a full renovation in 2008.

== History ==
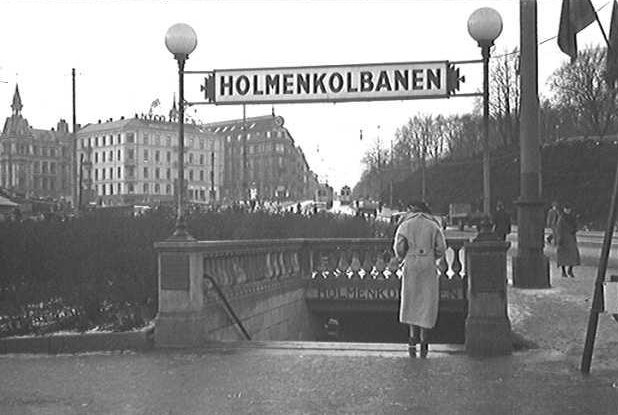
The entrance to the metro station from Johanne Dybwads plass in 1935

Planning of the extension of the suburban light rail Holmenkollen Line to the city center started in 1901. Construction began in 1912, but stopped again in 1914 because the municipality and the company could not agree on the location of the terminal station. The municipality wanted it at Ruseløkkveien. The following year, the municipality launched a contest to make the best suggestion for the tram networks. It took five years to select a winner, and this allowed the municipality and company to make a compromise by locating the terminus at Nationaltheatret. But not until 1926 was permission granted for the station. Construction commenced and the station and tunnel opened in 1928.

By the 1930s, Oslo had two main railway stations, Oslo East Station and Oslo West Station. Serving as the terminal station of the Drammen Line, Oslo West Station (Oslo V) was located in Vika, at the heart of the central business district of Oslo. The much larger Oslo East Station (Oslo Ø) served most commuter, regional and intercity trains. In 1938, the Station Committee of 1938 was established to look into a possible connection of the Drammen Line to Oslo Ø. Led by Axel Grenholm, the committee recommended building a branch from the Drammen Line as a tunnel under the city center, allowing all trains would terminate at Oslo Ø. It was proposed that the tunnel would run from Lassons gate west of Oslo V to Fred. Olsens gate, with an intermediate station close to the location of Oslo V.

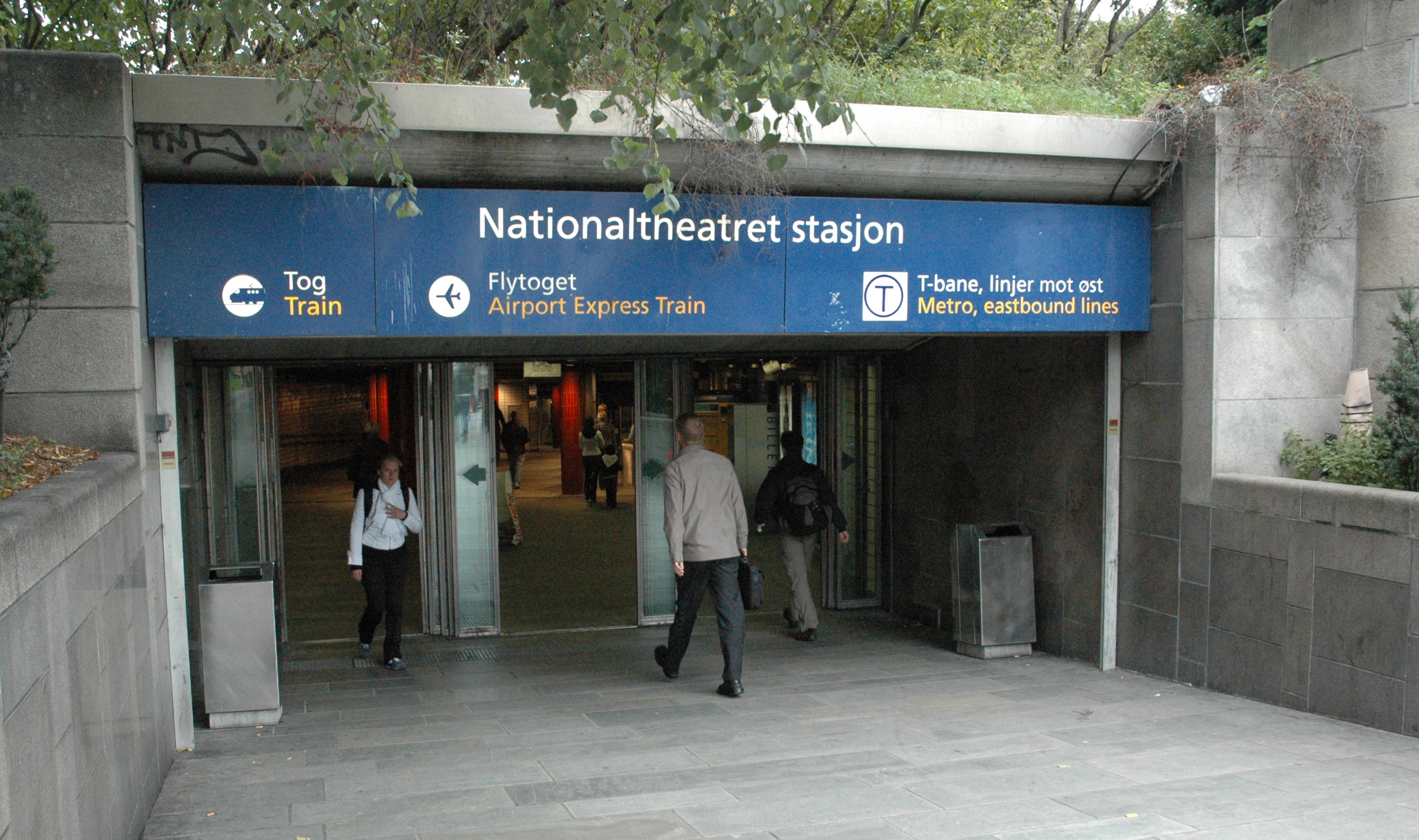
One of the original entrances, from Johanne Dybwads plass

In 1946, the Planning Office for Oslo Central Station, led by Fin Hvoslef, was established by the government. In 1950, they presented a new report, which recommended that a new route for the tunnel be considered, to ease construction and increase safety. This was in part based on an engineering report from 1949, which had made the first detailed plans for the line. Another committee, led by Oddvar Halvorsen, was established in 1960 to look at the matter again. Also it recommended a tunnel and a central station. However, it felt that the tunnel should be longer and intersect with the Drammen Line at a point between Skarpsno and Skøyen, and build a second station at Frogner. The proposal was presented to the Parliament of Norway on 4 November 1961, along with several other matters related to rail transport investments. Construction of the Oslo Tunnel, Oslo Central Station and Nationaltheatret was passed unanimously.

Another planning office was established in 1962, initially led by Erik Himle. The final plans for the route were passed by parliament in 1968, and construction started in 1971. The initial station was entirely blasted in bedrock and consisted of a single platform, 220 meters (720 ft) long and 11 meters (36 ft) wide. Adjacent to the bedrock is a layer of construction concrete and above the platforms, there are corrugated steel plates to catch drips and to reduce noise. The section of line past Nationaltheatret was part of a 480 meters (1,570 ft) section of the Oslo Tunnel designated Studenterlunden. Of this, 280-meter (920 ft) was to run with the Common Tunnel of the Oslo Metro directly above it, resulting in a two-story tunnel. However, just east of Nationaltheatret, the two lines diverge, so the metro station is not directly on top of the railway station.

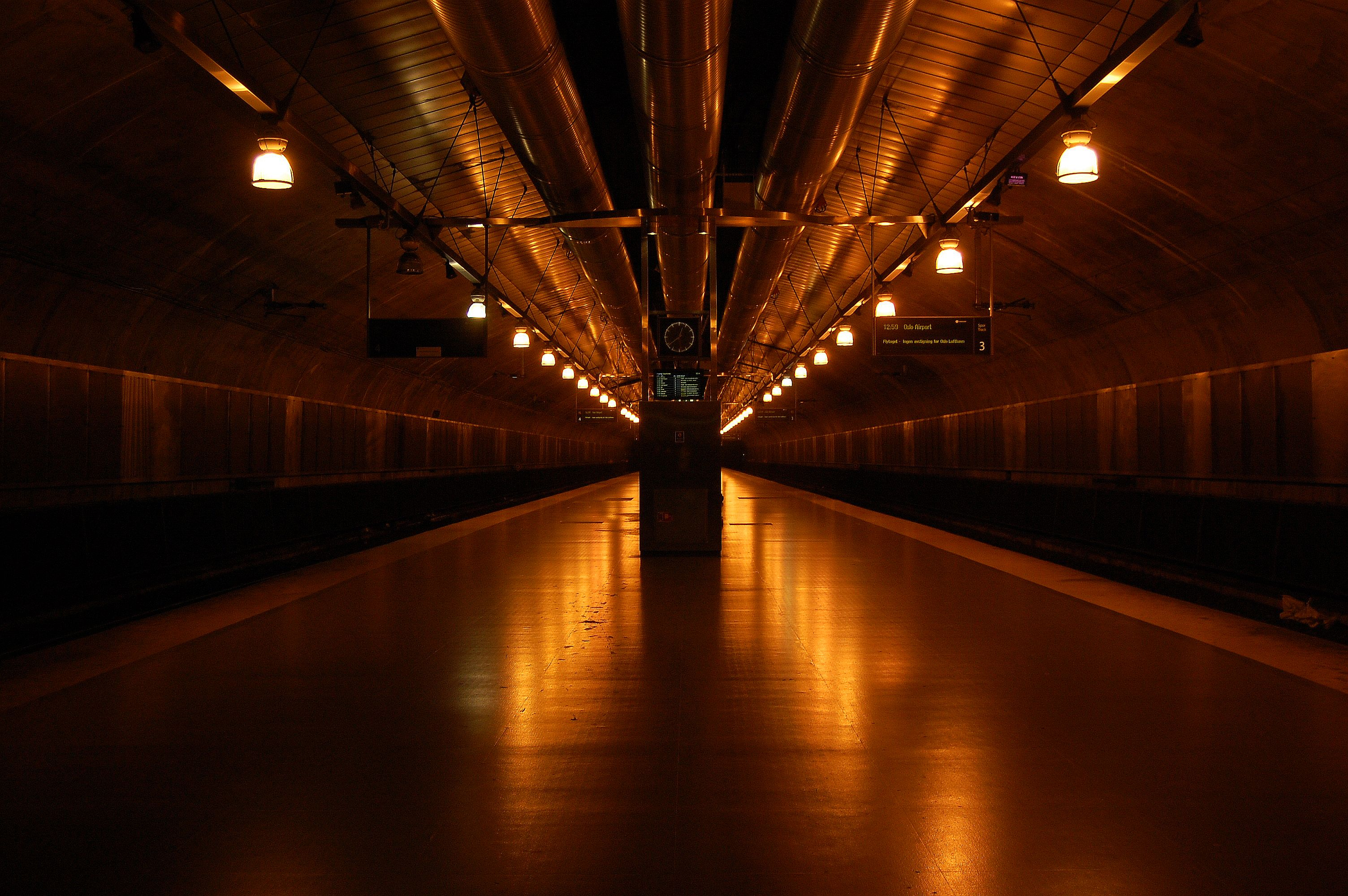
Eastbound platforms 3 and 4

The tunnel was officially opened on 30 May 1980 by Minister of Transport and Communications Ronald Bye and officially taken into use on 1 June. The tunnel, including Nationaltheatret, cost NOK 625 million Norwegian krone (NOK), of which Oslo Municipality had paid NOK 170 million. At first, the tunnel and Nationaltheatret was used by commuter trains from Lillestrøm to Drammen and Spikkestad, and trains from Eidsvoll and Årnes used the tunnel and turned at Skøyen. On 27 May 1989, Oslo V was closed and all traffic started running via Nationaltheatret.

From 1998, the Airport Express Train would start operating, and more capacity would be needed, both at Nationaltheatret and through the Oslo Tunnel. In 1995, then NSB held an architecture competition to expand the station, which was won by LPO Arkitektur og Design and their design "Next To Nothing". Construction commenced in October 1997 and consisted of building 830 meters (2,720 ft) of new tunnel, a new double platform, a larger vestibule, escalators and artwork. During the work, 110,000 cubic metres (3,900,000 cu ft) of rock were blasted and 33,000 cubic metres (1,200,000 cu ft) of concrete were poured. The station was decorated with works by Anne-Karin Furunes, Terje Roalkvam and Katrine Giæver. The upgrades cost NOK 920 million and was officially opened by King Harald V on 16 December 1999.

The new entrance was designed by Arne Eggen and decorated by Terje Roalkvam. Other art was designed by Bård Breivik and Ole Enstad, including reuse of some of the original vestibule art from 1980, including a green marble wall designed by Katrine Giæver that runs along the hallway leading to the metro station. The new platform was built using typical 1990s materials, such as glass, metal and concrete, contrasting the old platform which was much darker and featured dark terracotta tiles which were popular during the 1970s.

In 2008, the old section of Nationaltheatret Station was renovated, including tracks 1 and 2 and the two original entrances. Upgrades included new lighting, a new public address system, new escalators which have lighting that changes color, a more powerful fire safety system, improved emergency exits and replacement of cables and baldachin. The upgrade made the old section lighter, and visually similar to the new section, as it was previously painted in dark red. Between 2008 and 2012, the Norwegian National Rail Administration performed a major upgrade to the section between Lysaker and Etterstad, including the permanent way past Nationaltheatret. Among the upgrades are axle counters, mounting of an overhead conductor rail, new switches and new tracks.

== Facilities ==
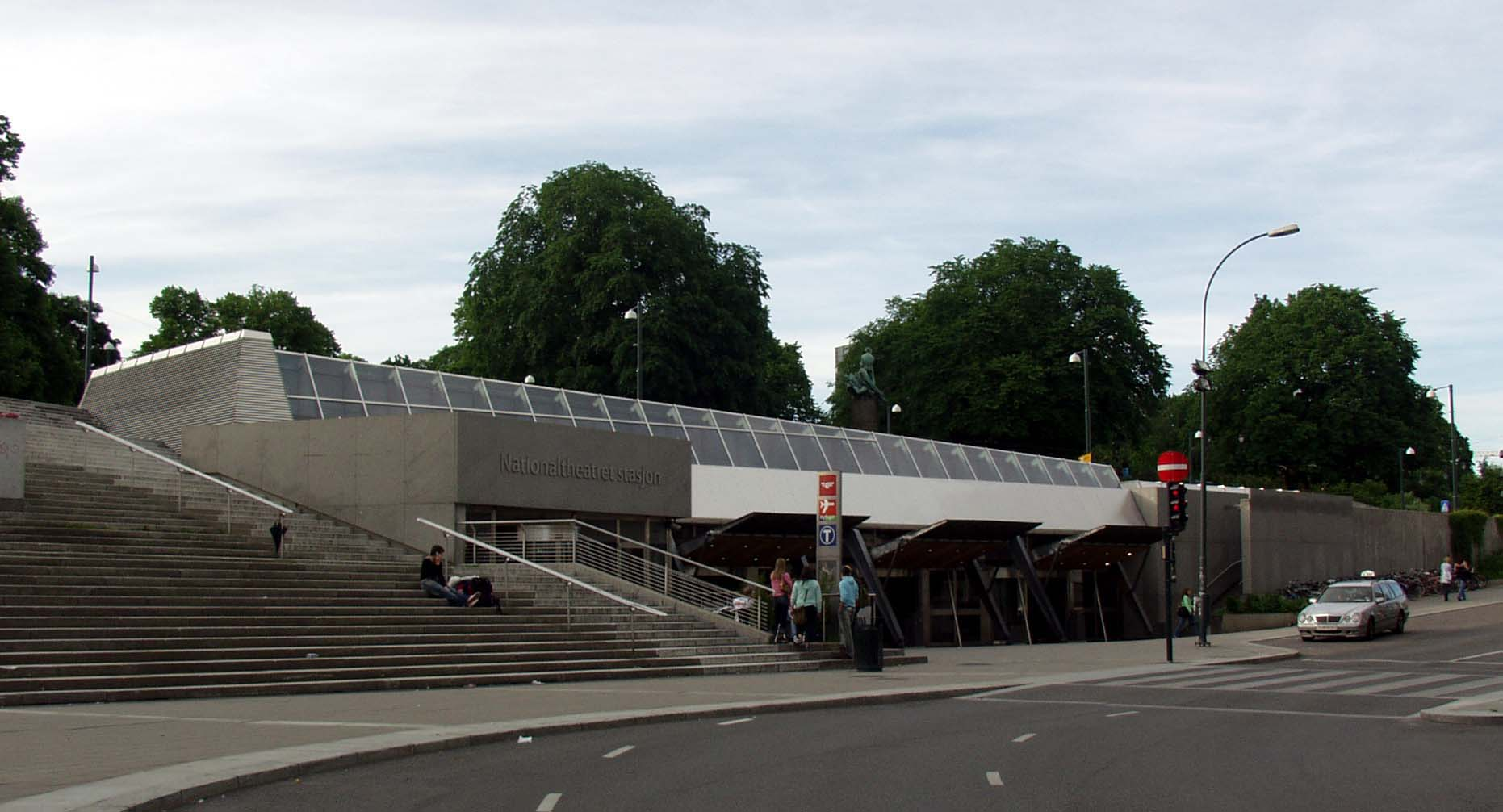
Main entrance to Nationaltheatret from Ruseløkkveien

Nationaltheatret is one of two underground mainline railway stations in Norway (the other being Holmestrand Station), located within the Oslo Tunnel on the Drammen Line. At ground level, there are three entrances to the station. On the east side of the station, the main entrance is from beneath 7. juni-plassen and Victoria Terrasse, facing Ruseløkkveien, and there is also an entrance from Johanne Dybwads plass, which is the site of the National Theatre. From the west, there is an entrance from Henrik Ibsens gate. There is a large, open vestibule near the surface at the entrance to Ruseløkkveien. It has high-mounted windows facing south, giving natural lighting. The area features escalators and elevators to the platforms, staffed ticket sale, lockers, kiosks and cafés. The station is also equipped with ticket machines and features baggage trolleys, washrooms and automated teller machines with an assortment of international currencies available. Parking is available 300 meters (1,000 ft) away at Vika, where car rental is also provided. Bicycle parking and taxi stands are located at street level.

There are two platforms and four tracks, with the older tracks 1 and 2 serving west-bound trains towards Skøyen and Drammen, while the newer tracks 3 and 4 serve east-bound trains to Oslo S. The platforms are 242 and 250 meters (794 and 820 ft) long, respectively, and located 30 meters (100 ft) below the surface. The station has a capacity for 40,000 passenger per day and is the second-busiest in Norway.

== Services ==
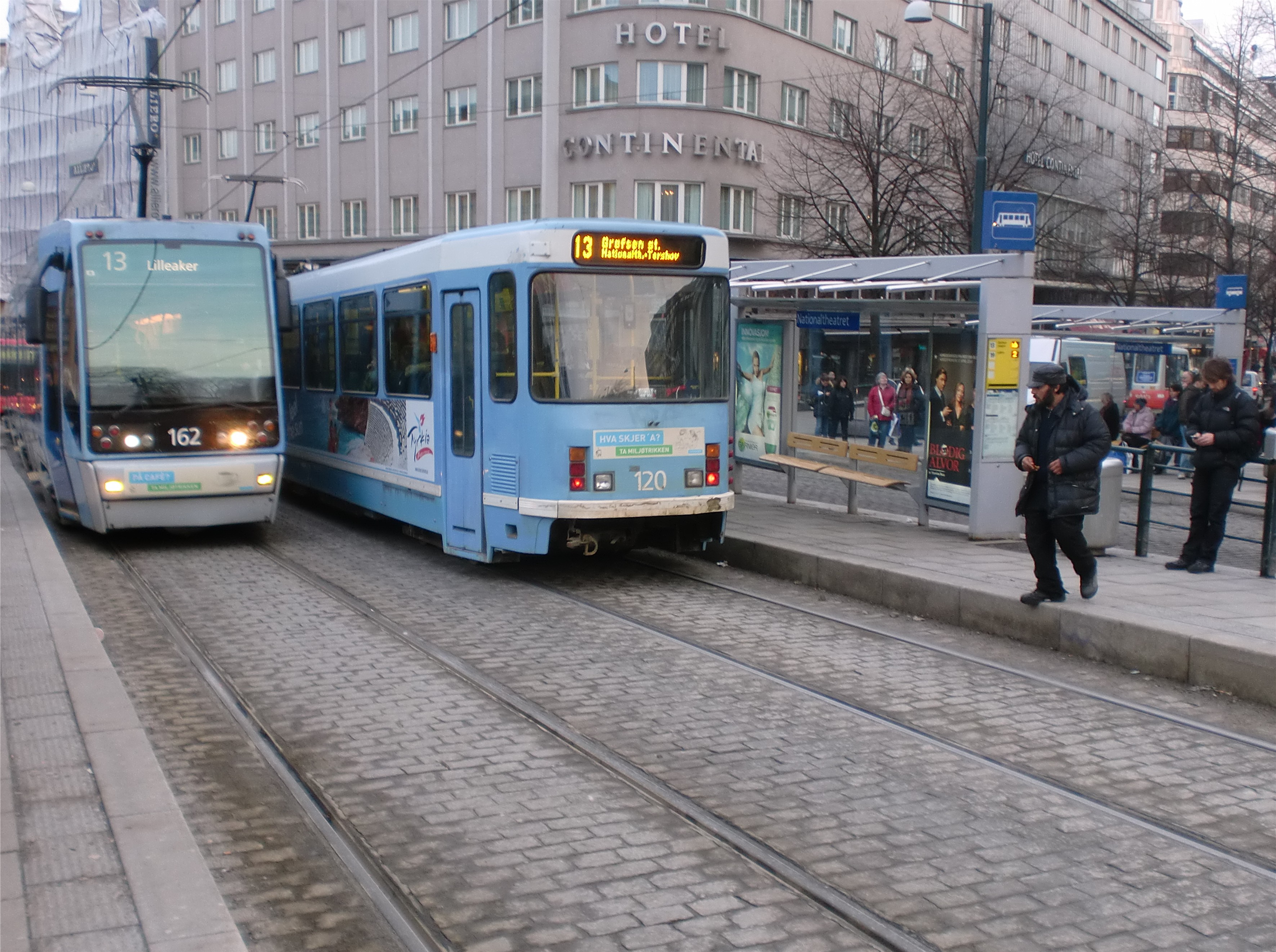
At ground level, there is a combined tram and bus station, here with SL95 (left) and SL79 (right) trams.

Vy's regional service along the Vestfold Line calls at Nationaltheatret, normally with a one-hour headway. Eastwards, these continue past Oslo S and serve the southern part of the Dovre Line until Lillehammer. All eight lines of the Oslo Commuter Rail stop at Nationaltheatret. However, not all services of all line operate west of Oslo S. The Airport Express Train operates direct, high-speed services to Oslo Airport, Gardermoen every 20 minutes, with the journey taking 28 minutes.

Located above the railway station, but nonetheless underground, is a metro station, which serves all six lines of the Oslo Metro. The next west-bound station is Majorstuen (formerly Valkyrie plass, but that station exists no more), while the next east-bound station is Stortinget. At ground level, there is transfer to lines 13 and 19 of the Oslo Tramway. The station is located on the Briskeby Line and serves westbound trains heading along the Briskeby and Lilleaker Lines, and eastbound station, via Jernbanetorget, along the Ekeberg Line and the Grünerløkka–Torshov Line. The station also serves Ruter buses 30, 31, 32, 54, 70 and 81.

Preceding station	Express trains		Following station
Skøyen	F5	Stavanger-Kristiansand–Oslo S	Oslo S
Preceding station	Regional trains		Following station
Skøyen	RE10	Drammen–Oslo S–Lillehammer	Oslo S
Skøyen	RE11	Skien–Oslo S–Eidsvoll	Oslo S
Preceding station	Flytoget		Following station
Skøyen towards Drammen		FLY1	Oslo S towards Oslo Airport, Gardemoen
Skøyen towards Stabekk		FLY2	Oslo S towards Oslo Airport, Gardemoen
Preceding station	Local trains		Following station
Skøyen	L1	Spikkestad–Oslo S–Lillestrøm	Oslo S
Skøyen	R13	Drammen–Oslo S–Dal	Oslo S
Skøyen	R12	Kongsberg–Oslo S–Eidsvoll	Oslo S
Skøyen	R14	Asker–Oslo S–Kongsvinger	Oslo S
Skøyen	L2	Stabekk–Oslo S–Ski	Oslo S
Skøyen	R21	Oslo S–Moss	Oslo S
Skøyen	R22	Oslo S–Mysen	Oslo S
