= Gardermoen (disambiguation) =

Gardermoen may refer to:

- Gardermoen, Norway
- Oslo Airport
- Gardermoen Air Station
- Gardermoen Line
- Gardermoen Station
- Norwegian Armed Forces Aircraft Collection at Gardermoen
