= High-speed rail in Norway =

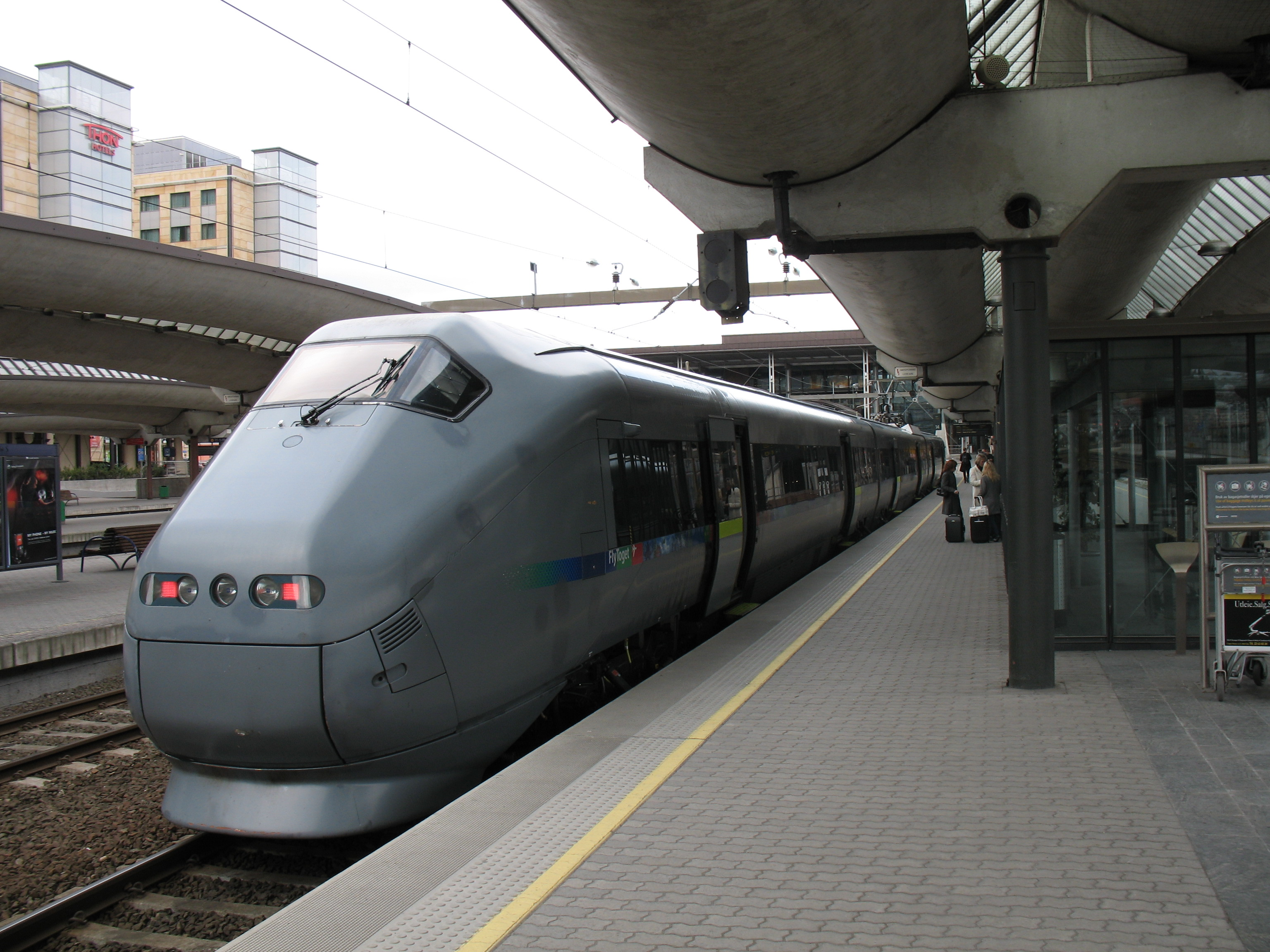
Airport express train station in Oslo

Opened on the 8th of October 1998, the only high-speed rail in Norway, on the railways of Norway is on Gardermobanen, a 64 kilometer line between Oslo Central Station and Eidsvoll via Oslo Airport. The main service on this route is Flytoget, commuting between Oslo Airport and the metropolitan areas of Oslo at speeds of up to 210 km/h (130 mph). It was extended westwards to include the city of Drammen in 2008, though not at high speed. The high-speed section is also used by express and regional trains between Oslo and Eidsvoll.

In September 2010, Jernbaneverket awarded several contracts for research into new high-speed routes in Norway. These focus on six routes; five from Oslo to Bergen, Kristiansand/Stavanger, Trondheim, Gothenburg, and Stockholm, plus a sixth coastal route through Bergen, Haugesund and Stavanger.

== Background ==
Compared to continental European countries, Norway is far more sparsely populated and quite mountainous. On the one hand this causes problems filling up trains, especially compared to other European projects and will give difficulties reaching necessary passenger numbers. On the other hand, Norwegians travel considerably more long-distance than other Europeans, for instance three of Europe's 11 busiest air routes are within Norway. Also, the long-distance road network of Norway has relatively low average speed, making air travel the main long-distance travel option today. The slow roads make it easier for trains to compete, even though the road network also is being upgraded. For example, a 4-lane motorway from Oslo to Hamar was opened in the early 2020s. The difficult geography with fjords and mountains has historically meant circuitous routes of both roads and rail lines.

Estimates for construction costs have shown that building in Norway is considerably cheaper than on the continent, due to the ability to build tracks straight on bedrock. Also the tunnels usually can be made without sealing (like the many road tunnels). Furthermore, expropriation costs are lower since most of the corridors will go through unpopulated areas.

So far, train speed has not been prioritised on long-distance railways in Norway. Oslo-Bergen (526 km) takes about 6:40 in 2023. Oslo-Trondheim (552 km) takes 6:45. These times are about the same as during the last decades, and give an average speed of about 80 km/h. Oslo-Gothenburg is a little faster at 89 km/h, but this is due to Sweden's rail quality having a higher average speed of 112 km/h, rather than Norway's 72 km/h.

As can be seen in the chapter "Future plans", not much will be built before 2020, and no new track will be operated above 200 km/h in this time. If there is a decision to really build new long-distance high-speed lines it will represent a big change in national transport policy. The situation changed in 2018 after new transportation investment plan. It is claimed that additional 270 km of high-speed lines will be built until 2029.

== Lines in operation ==
Line	Section	Stations	Length		Top speed	Opened	Rolling stock
Line	Section	Stations	km	mi	Top speed	Opened	Rolling stock
Gardermoen Line	Lillestrøm-Eidsvoll	Lillestrøm · Oslo Airport · Eidsvoll Verk · Eidsvoll	64	40	210 km/h	8 October 1998	
Dovre Line	Langset-Kleverud		17	10	200 km/h	12 December 2015	
Dovre Line	Venjar-Minnesund	Eidsvoll	13	8	200 km/h	23 October 2023	
Vestfold Line	Skotte-Tønsberg	Skotte · Jarlsberg Tunnel · Tønsberg			200 km/h	7 November 2011	
Vestfold Line	Holm-Nykirke	Holm · Holmestrand · Nykirke	12		250 km/h	28 November 2016	
Vestfold Line	Larvik-Porsgrunn	Larvik · Porsgrunn	31.36		250 km/h	2018	
Follo Line	Oslo-Ski	Oslo · Ski	22	14	250 km/h	11 December 2022	

== Plans ==
There are currently plans to build a few 200 km/h railways in the near future. This limit of 200 km/h might be raised slightly in the future on certain straight sections of track. Around 2012 a decision was made to try allowing speeds of 250 km/h on new projects, because an EU directive mandates this on new mainlines.

- A new high-speed track for Vestfoldbanen, Drammen–Tønsberg is to be finished around 2024.
  - The rest of the railway Drammen–Skien will be upgraded.
  - A new railway will be built between Porsgrunn and the Sørlandet Line around Risør, mostly in tunnel. No decided time schedule.
- The new track Eidsvoll–Hamar on the Dovre Line is expected to be finished around 2024, with 200 km/h most of the track.
  - A new railway built between Langset and Kleverud allowing 200 km/h was opened in December 2015.
- A new track Ringeriksbanen Oslo–Hønefoss, mostly in a tunnel, will cut travel time between those two cities with up to one hour (indicated time gains depend on political prioritisations.) No decided time plan.
- In about 1995 a new double track Ski-Moss was constructed, which is straight enough for 200 km/h for most of the route. However, only 160 km/h is permitted on this stretch (with an average speed of just 105 km/h). The route can easily be upgraded.

=== Long-term plans ===
There is also a political climate for building more high-speed railway services in Norway. The Norwegian National Railway Administration, Jernbaneverket, has paid for an analysis on the possibilities for building high-speed railway services in Norway. The VWI Stuttgart (Institute of Transportation Research at the University of Stuttgart, Germany) has done this analysis.

The conclusions indicate that the most promising corridors are Oslo-Gothenburg (in Sweden) and Oslo-Trondheim (through the Østerdalen valley). The Oslo-Bergen corridor could expect the highest passenger count, but is much more expensive to build.

According to the report, the lines are assumed to be single-track railways, with up to 4% grade, dedicated to high-speed passenger trains with a 250 km/h (155 mph) maximum cruise speed. Closer to the big cities, the railways would be double-track and also be used for regional trains.

The feasibility study has suggested that a passenger count of 5000 per day per line could be expected if rail is competitive with air travel. This is much lower than German or French high-speed lines, and building double tracks will not be economical. It will, however, be hard to get below three hours from Oslo to Bergen or Trondheim on single track, as meeting trains will be very sensitive to delays. Travel time above three hours makes it hard to compete with air travel. There is no single-track high-speed railway in operation in the world at the moment (one such, the Botniabanan in Sweden is built for 250 km/h, but does not operate above 200). The VWI investigation suggests very long passing loops (15 km) to be able to pass at 160 km/h, and accept some delays without delaying meeting trains. Since these railways would be high-speed only, the passing loops need only to be 30 minutes travel time (80–100 km) apart (assuming one train per hour per direction).

Though the initiative to the analysis itself is an evidence of a promising political climate for high-speed railways, the analysis has been heavily criticized for not being done by a recognised competence in this area, for being based on inaccurate facts, and for using gross miscalculations of important data, like potential passenger numbers and potential costs of building new high-speed tracks. Mainly these criticisms are from lobbyist organisations which prefer railways to Bergen and Ålesund, which has been seen as too expensive by VWI. Especially the recommendation by WVI to use Østerdalen (with very sparse population) and only one stop there has been criticised.

A follow-up study on the Oslo-Trondheim route by Rambøll, commissioned by Jernbaneverket, also concluded the route through the Østerdalen valley would be the shortest, flattest, and fastest with a design speed up to 330 km/h (205 mph). The study highlighted the route would require significantly less tunnelling compared to alternative options (Gudbrandsdal & Rondane), reducing overall costs and construction time while having the least environmental impact.

The red–green coalition government, with support from the Progress Party and the Conservative Party, declared in 2013 that there would be no high-speed railways outside the regional network around Oslo until at least 2030, claiming it would be a waste of money. Their position changed after new plans were approved in 2018, when the government decided to increase investment in transportation, allocating significant funding for rail infrastructure, renewal projects, and digitalisation as part of the National Transportation Plan for 2018–2029.

=== Suggestions for high-speed railway networks ===
There are also some independent initiatives for high-speed railways in Norway:

- Norsk Bane is an initiative for a high-speed railway network that will cover large parts of Southern Norway. It is backed by local organisations like municipalities. It has several lines that can be considered independently, but at its greatest extent it will include the major cities of Bergen, Kristiansand, Stavanger, Trondheim and Ålesund with a hub in Oslo. In addition there will also be a line through the Vestfold region and lines both west and east of the Mjøsa lake. This project will however need political support before it can be started. Norsk Bane has criticised the VWI investigation mainly because it did not prioritise railways to Hordaland and Møre og Romsdal. Norsk Bane has been criticised because they assume 250 km/h average speed (between stops) at 250 km/h cruise speed and assuming 2:30 travel time Oslo-Trondheim including seven stops (490 km). This is not possible even on a double track railway.
- Den sørnorske høyhastighetsringen was a political initiative (around 2005) for building a high-speed railway ring that will include the major cities Oslo, Bergen, Stavanger and Kristiansand, in addition to the densely populated Vestfold region. This proposal wants to use the existing corridors of Bergensbanen and along the south coast. This is also a lobbyist organisation backed by local forces.
- A lobby organisation, Oslo-Sthlm 2.55, led by the Swedish counties of Värmland and Örebro has proposed a high-speed railway Oslo–Stockholm. Trains take over 5 hours at present, making air travel leading with 1.4 million passengers 2019. The aim is to have below three hours. One hour would be saved by a new railway between Arvika and Lillestrøm or Ski in Norway. More time would be saved by new railways or widening single track to double track almost all the way to Stockholm. As of 2020 this has gained some interest from the Norwegian Government, but the Norwegian or Swedish railway administration have not made any official pilot study.
