= Varud Station =

Railway station in Eidsvoll, Norway

Coordinates: 60°16′10″N 11°12′37″E

Varud
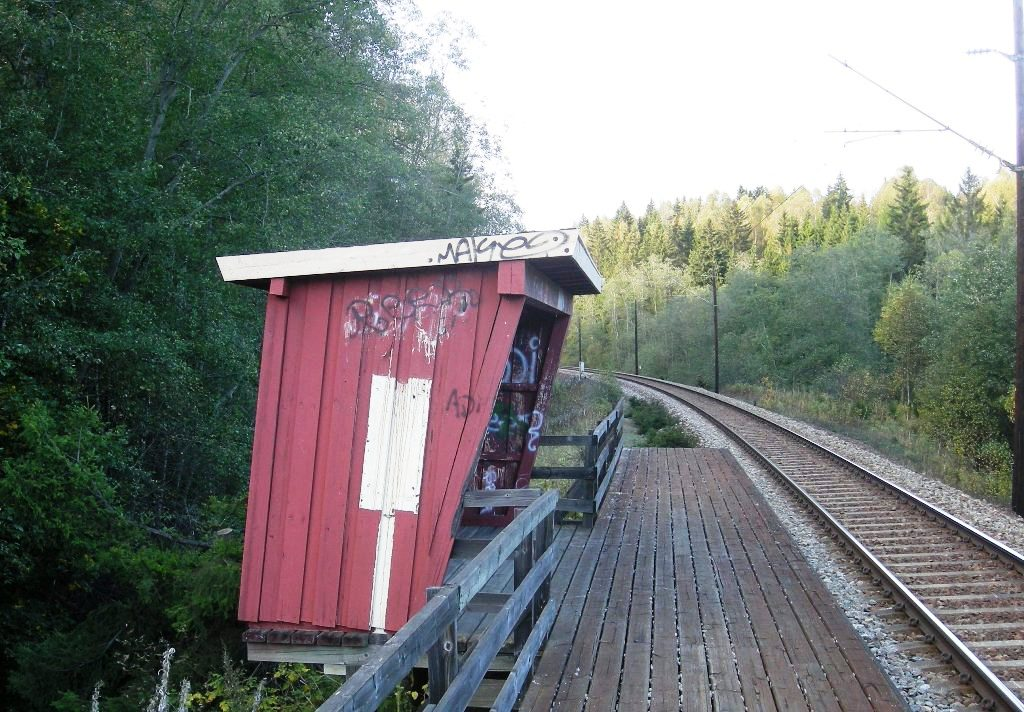
- Varud in 2009

General information
- System: Unstaffed halt
- Line: Hovedbanen

History
- Opened: 1953
- Closed: 2004
Location

Varud halt (Norwegian: Varud holdeplass) is a former stopping-place on the Hovedbane (Norwegian Trunk Railway), located 59.54 km from Oslo S station near the village of Råholt in Eidsvoll Municipality. No trains have stopped at Varud since 13 June 2004.
