= Eidsvoll Station (1854–1998) =

Former railway station in Eidsvoll, Norway (1854–1998)

Eidsvoll
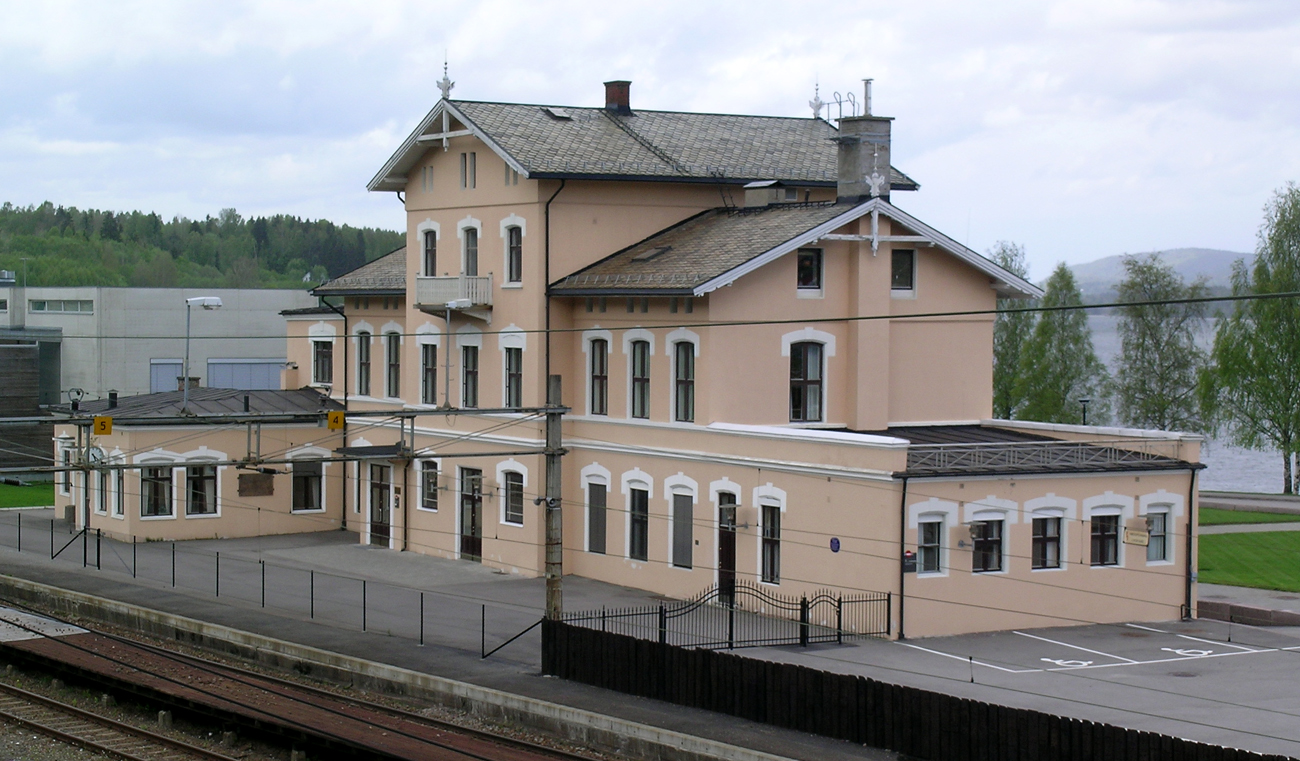

General information
- Location: Eidsvoll in Akershus; Norway
- Coordinates: 60°19′39″N 11°15′07″E
- Owner: Norwegian State Railways
- Operator: Norwegian State Railways
- Lines: Trunk Line; Dovre Line

Construction
- Architect: Jacob Wilhelm Nordan

History
- Opened: 1 September 1854
- Rebuilt: 1878
Location

Eidsvoll Station (Norwegian: Eidsvoll stasjon) was a railway station at Eidsvoll in Akershus, Norway. It was located on the Trunk Line (Hovedbanen).

== History ==
Eidsvoll Station opened in 1854 as the terminus of Norway's first railway. It had a temporary building at first, but a proper building with hotel was opened in 1858. That station building burned down on October 16, 1877. The present building was designed by Jacob Wilhelm Nordan and constructed in 1878, similar to the previous. A 20-room hotel was established in the station building which from 1924 was under the operation of Norsk Spisevognselskap, which also took over the restaurant.

The former Eidsvoll Station remained in use until 1998, when the construction of the Gardermoen Line forced the opening of the new Eidsvoll Station which was built slightly northwards to allow it to serve the Trunk Line, the Gardermoen Line and the Dovre Line.

== Other sources ==
- Just, Carl (1949). A/S Norsk Spisevognselskap 1919–1949 (in Norwegian). Oslo: Norsk Spisevognselskap. OCLC 40310643.

Preceding station		Following station
Bøn	Trunk Line	—
—	Dovre Line	Eidsvoll
