= Arkitektskap =

Norwegian architecture company

Arkitektskap AS is a Norwegian architecture company based in Oslo.

Among the company's projects are Eidsvoll Verk Station on the high-speed Gardermoen Line, the Oslo Metro stations Mortensrud and Forskningsparken, stations along the Ullevål Hageby Line of the Oslo Tramway, Farriseid Bridge, Drammen Bridge, Sørenga, Filipstad, Norwegian National Route 108, European Route E18 from Grimstad to Kristiansand, Jernbanetorget, Akershus University Hospital and Vippetangen.
