= Nils Aas =

Norwegian sculptor (1933–2004)

Nils Sigurd Aas
- Born: 21 April 1933; Inderøy, Norway
- Died: 10 February 2004 (aged 70); Oslo, Norway
- Known for: Abstract sculpture
- Notable work: Haakon VII - 7. juni-plassen, Oslo. Hjalmar Andersen - Bislett Stadium, Oslo
- Awards: Oslo City Culture Prize; 1972; Knight of the Order of St. Olav; 1990; Per Palle Storms Award; 2001

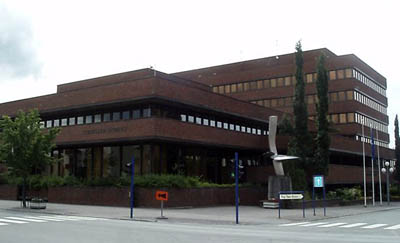
Steinkjer Municipality town hall with nonfigurative work by Aas outside

Nils Sigurd Aas (21 April 1933 – 10 February 2004) was a Norwegian sculptor. He was one of the most prominent artists in modern Norwegian sculpture and is particularly well known for his statue of Haakon VII, located in the June Seventh Square in Oslo, and for designing coins for Norwegian currency, including 10-krone and 20-krone coins.

== Biography ==
Nils Sigurd Aas was born in Inderøy Municipality, in Nord-Trøndelag county, Norway. He grew up in a family of prominent carpenters and furniture makers. His grandfather (also named Nils Aas) had established a carpentry workshop and water-driven sawmill in Straumen. His father, Ivar Aas, took over the carpentry workshop at the death of the elder Nils Aas in 1927, and eventually won awards for his furniture work. The family also operated a Sunday School out of the same building as the workshop, from 1933 to 1973. Aas' mother Inga Lie was from Telemark and had come to the village in 1928, working for the local parish priest. Ivar and Inga met and married the same year, and the couple had five children: Marit (1929), Signe (1930), Nils (1933), Aslaug (1935) and Arne (1941). In his youth, Nils was an active as ski jumper and athlete.

Nils was educated in the family trade of woodworking from an early age, and his earliest preserved work is a wooden sculpture of Bishop Arne Fjellbu, made when Aas was 16 years old. After graduating from secondary school and after a short stint in military service, Aas applied to the Norwegian National Academy of Craft and Art Industry in 1954 at the age of 21; his older sister, Marit, had started at the school two years earlier. His father marked the occasion by making a suitcase of wood as a farewell gift to the son. Aas studied at the school from 1954 to 1958, notably under Arne Bruland and Ivar Bell. Bell taught Aas calligraphy but ultimately pushed his pupil towards his eventual career as another type of artist, commenting "I think you are three-dimensional"; Aas took the advice and enrolled in sculpture classes the next term. Upon leaving the institute, Nils went on to study under sculptor Nils Flakstad from 1958 to 1959. At the end of 1959, he accepted work with Per Palle Storm.

As a student, Aas had various commercial and industry jobs, particularly over his summers, including a stint at an advertising agency, and another as an assistant at the architectural and planning offices in Steinkjer. Advertising did not appeal to him, but the experience in architecture further influenced his concepts for sculpture, particularly those designed for public spaces. In his last term at the National Academy, and for several years following, Aas began to work as an assistant to the abstract sculptor Arnold Haukeland, who would have a substantial impact upon Aas's own style. Aas worked for Haukeland in varying capacities through 1966, at which point Haukeland took on a new assistant and encouraged Aas to develop his own reputation. Through Haukeland, Aas was introduced to the aesthetics of abstract form. He participated in the creation of two of Haukeland's most famous sculptures: Elements Fountain at the Bærum Municipality Town Hall and Dynamics, a sculpture on the promenade at Sjølyst in Oslo. It was in Haukeland's studio that Aas created his own debut work (titled Torso) for the Autumn Exhibition in Oslo.

== Art works ==
Aas's art is featured in numerous public spaces in Norway, and he is represented by important works in the National Museum of Art, Architecture and Design and the Trondheim Kunstmuseum. Aas' work in sculpture spanned several different styles and material bases. His most famous work, a statue of King Haakon VII, located in the June 7 Plaza, is made of clay and plaster and cast in bronze. A statue of Henrik Ibsen in Bergen is made of granite, while several other public decorative works are made in wood. His 10-ton heavy wall decoration Nordisk Lys in the Council of Europe's Council of Ministers building in Strasbourg is made of laminated spruce. It is 16 meters wide and 6 meters high.

Several other Aas works were rendered in steel wire and/or paper. Among these are a miniature statue of a horseback rider in steel wire and figures representing Marcus Aurelius, Rallar, and Charlie Chaplin composed of steel wire and copper plate. He is also known for a large number of small sculptures made entirely from paper. A number of other sculptures, often formed to serve as facades to walls, were made entirely from wood.

Other statues by Nils Aas include works based on Grete Waitz and Henrik Ibsen. He also created a large number of portrait busts, including works modeled on Einar Gerhardsen, Johan Borgen, Arthur Rubinstein, Håkon Bleken, Harald Sæverud, Jakob Weidemann and Rolf Jacobsen. Aas is also well known as the designer of a number of medals and coins for official treasury or governmental purposes in Norway, most notably the current 10-krone and 20-krone coins.

== Selected works ==
- Haakon VII - 7. juni-plassen, Oslo
- Hjalmar Andersen - Bislett Stadium, Oslo
- Henrik Ibsen - Den Nationale Scene, Bergen
- Charlie Chaplin - Colosseum Cinema, Oslo
- Anne Stine and Helge Ingstad - Vikingskipshuset, Oslo
- Marilyn Monroe - Haugesund
- P.C. Reinsnes - Sortland

== Awards and honors ==
- 1972 - Oslo City Culture Prize
- 1984 - Statens æreslønn
- 1990 - Anders Jahre cultural prize (Anders Jahres kulturpris) (jointly with Asbjørn Aarnes)
- 1990 - Knight of the Order of St. Olav
- 1996 - Inderøy Municipality Culture Prize
- 2001 - Ingeborg og Per Palle Storms ærespris

== Personal life ==
In 1959, Aas married painter and illustrator Tonje Strøm, whom he had met at the National Academy. The marriage lasted until 1978 and the couple had two sons. One of their sons, Atle Aas, is an architect and is married to professor Camilla Stoltenberg. In 1996, Aas married for a second time, this time to fellow craftsworker Christine Reintz. Aas died in 2004 at the age of 70.

== Nils Aas Kunstverksted ==
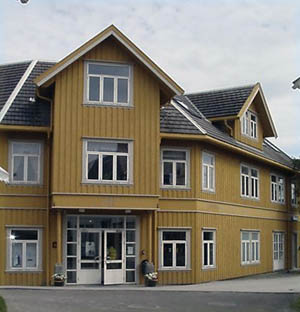
Nils Aas Kunstverksted

The Nils Aas Kunstverksted (Art Workshop), located in Inderøy, now serves partly as a museum and retains a permanent collection of Aas' work. The building is designed by Aas himself. The most notable piece is a huge circular monument made in birch wood, situated in the centre of the museum. Many of the sculptor's busts of famous Norwegians are also on permanent display. In addition, the museum still features a workshop for art lessons. The facility opened in 1996 and is operated in association with the Stiklestad National Culture Centre.

Nearby is a sculpture park, Muustrøparken. Nils Aas had donated eight sculptures to the park, including 6 small and 2 large sculptures.
