= Tonje Strøm =

Norwegian artist (1937–2010)

Tonje Strøm (20 April 1937 – 2 November 2010) was a Norwegian painter and illustrator.

She was born in Oslo as a daughter of physician Roar Strøm (1901–1958) and Ingeborg Andersen (1901–1966). She was married to sculptor Nils Aas, but the marriage was dissolved in 1978.

She took her education at the Norwegian National Academy of Craft and Art Industry. She was employed as an illustrator in the women's magazine Sirene between 1973 and 1983, and also wrote designs for the anti-nuclear movement. She also illustrated children's books.
