= Gardermoen, Norway =

Settlement in Ullensaker Municipality, Norway

Coordinates: 60°13′N 11°06′E

Gardermoen is an area at the border of the municipalities Nannestad and Ullensaker in Akershus, Norway. In 1998, it had a population of 259 people. Oslo Airport, Gardermoen, Gardermoen Air Station, Norwegian Armed Forces Aircraft Collection and Oslo Airport Station (train station) are located in the area.

Gardermoen is a compound of the farm name Garder and the finite form of mo m 'moor; drill ground' (thus 'the moor belonging to the farm Garder'). The farm was first mentioned in 1328 (Garðar), and the name is the plural of Norse garðr m 'fence'. The meaning is probably 'enclosure; fenced fields'.

== Road routes through Gardermoen ==
- European route E6
- European route E16
