= Eidsvoll Verk Station =

Railway station in Råholt, Norway

Eidsvoll Verk
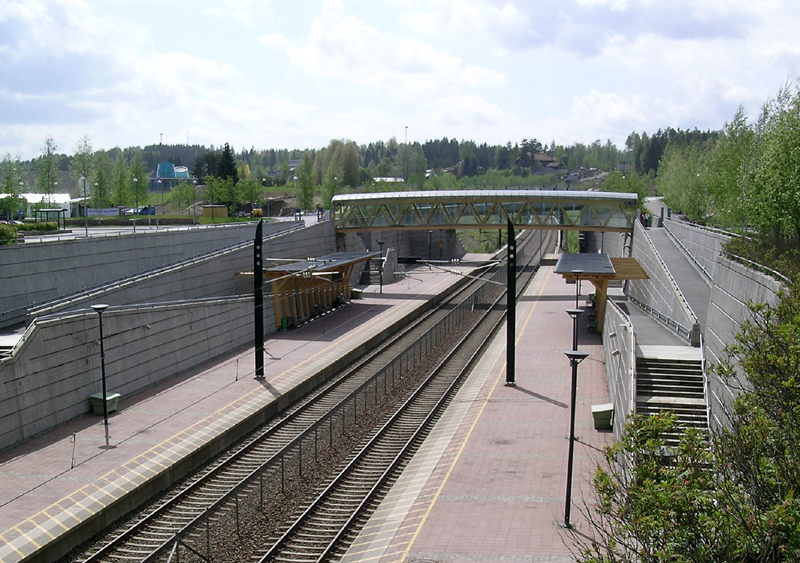

General information
- Location: Råholt, Eidsvoll; Norway
- Coordinates: 60°17′15.78″N 11°10′9.86″E
- Owner: Bane NOR
- Operator: Vy
- Line: Gardermoen Line
- Distance: 63.3 km (39.3 mi)
- Platforms: 2
- Connections: Bus: Ruter

Construction
- Architect: Arkitektskap

History
- Opened: 27 September 1998
Location

Eidsvoll Verk Station (Norwegian: Eidsvoll Verk stasjon) is a railway station located on the Gardermoen Line at Råholt near Eidsvoll Verk in Eidsvoll, Norway. The station was taken into use in 1999 when the commuter trains to Eidsvoll started using the Gardermoen Line. It was designed by Arkitektskap and built in concrete, with details in metal and wood, and is sunk into the ground.

== Service ==
The Oslo Commuter Rail, operated by Vy, serves Eidsvoll Verk twice per hour with lines L12 Eidsvoll - Oslo S - Drammen - Kongsberg, and R11 Eidsvoll - Oslo S - Larvik/Skien. The service has only one northbound station, Eidsvoll, 5 minutes away. Travel time to Oslo Airport is 5 minutes, and to Oslo Central Station, 30 minutes. The public transport authority Ruter operates bus services to the station, including a correspondence from Eidsvoll Verk via the station to Dal. There is also a taxi stand at the station.

== Facilities ==
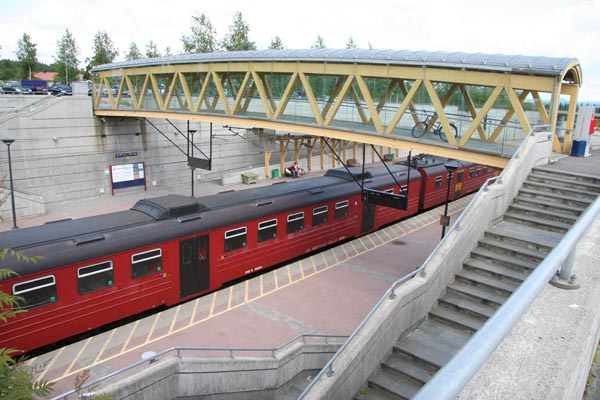
A Class 69 train at the station

The station is designed in the same style as the rest of the Gardermoen Line and the Airport Express Train. The station consists of two side platforms lowered 7.5 metres (25 ft) in the terrain. The walls are covered in ramps and stairs to liven up the concrete walls with metal detailing. Above the station is a walkway built in wood; its curved shape was designed to fit in with the hilly landscape. On the west side is a bus stop, on the east side is a park and ride facility.

The station is unstaffed and without a station building, but the platforms have sheds and ticket machines. It is located south of Eidsvoll Station and north of Oslo Airport Station on the Gardermoen Line, 63 kilometres (39 mi) from Oslo Central Station.

== History ==
Eidsvoll Verk was built along with the rest of the Gardermoen Line for the opening of Oslo Airport, Gardermoen in 1998. The station was designed by Arkitektskap, with construction starting in 1997. The station opened on 27 September 1998, but the commuter train service along the line did not start until 1999, when the Romerike Tunnel opened. In 2008, the parking lot was expanded with an additional 36 parking spaces.

Preceding station			Following station
Oslo Airport	Gardermoen Line		Eidsvoll
Preceding station	Regional trains		Following station
Oslo Airport	RE11	Skien–Oslo S–Eidsvoll	Eidsvoll
Preceding station	Local trains		Following station
Oslo Airport	R12	Kongsberg–Oslo S–Eidsvoll	Eidsvoll
