= Sirene (magazine) =

Norwegian feminist magazine (1973–1983)

- Categories: Feminist magazine
- Frequency: Monthly
- Circulation: 20,000 (1975)
- Publisher: J.W. Cappelens Forlag (1973–1976)
- Founded: 1973
- Final issue: 1983
- Country: Norway
- Based in: Christiania (Oslo)
- Language: Norwegian

Sirene was a Norwegian feminist magazine, issued from 1973 to 1983.

== History and profile ==
Sirene was launched in 1973. One of the founders was Bjørg Vik. The magazine was published by the publishing house J.W. Cappelens Forlag from 1973 to 1976, and thereafter by a dedicated foundation. It had a circulation of 20,000 at its maximum in 1975.

In a thesis dated 1978 at the University of Oslo, Turid Kleiva described Sirene as a feminist alternative to the traditional weekly magazines. The magazine did not have a dedicated editor, but was produced collectively by a group of editors. The editorial staff included Bjørg Vik, Bitten Modal, IdaLou Larsen and others. Sirene's regular illustrators included Tonje Strøm. The magazine ended publication in 1983.
