= 7. juni-plassen =

Square in Oslo, Norway

Coordinates: 59.9149°N 10.72990°E

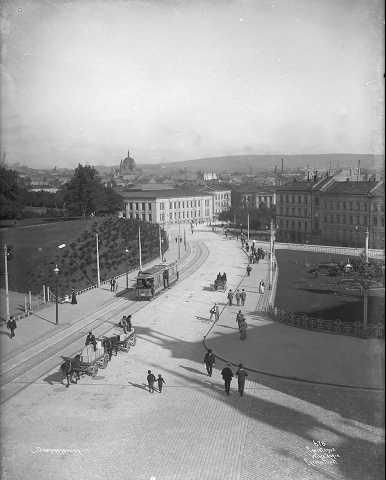
Photograph from 1902, 7. juni-plassen to the right.

7. juni-plassen ('The 7 June Square') is a square in Oslo, Norway.

It is located at Ruseløkka in Vika, southwest of Slottsparken and the Royal Palace and west of the National Theatre.

It was originally named Triangelplassen ('The Triangle Square'), but was renamed in 1962 after 7 June 1905, the day when the Union between Sweden and Norway was declared dissolved by the Norwegian government. In the southern end of the square is found the entrance to the Norwegian Ministry of Foreign Affairs. At the square is the famous statue of King Haakon VII of Norway—who returned to the country on 7 June 1945 from his exile imposed due to the 1940–1945 German occupation of Norway—sculpted by Nils Aas.

The Skøyen Line passes north of the square, and it is within walking distance of Nationaltheatret Station. Directly below it, underground, is Nationaltheatret Railway Station.

VM-paviljongen was placed on this square before and during the FIS Nordic World Ski Championships 2011.
