= NSB Class 71 =

High-speed electric train type operating in Norway

Class 71
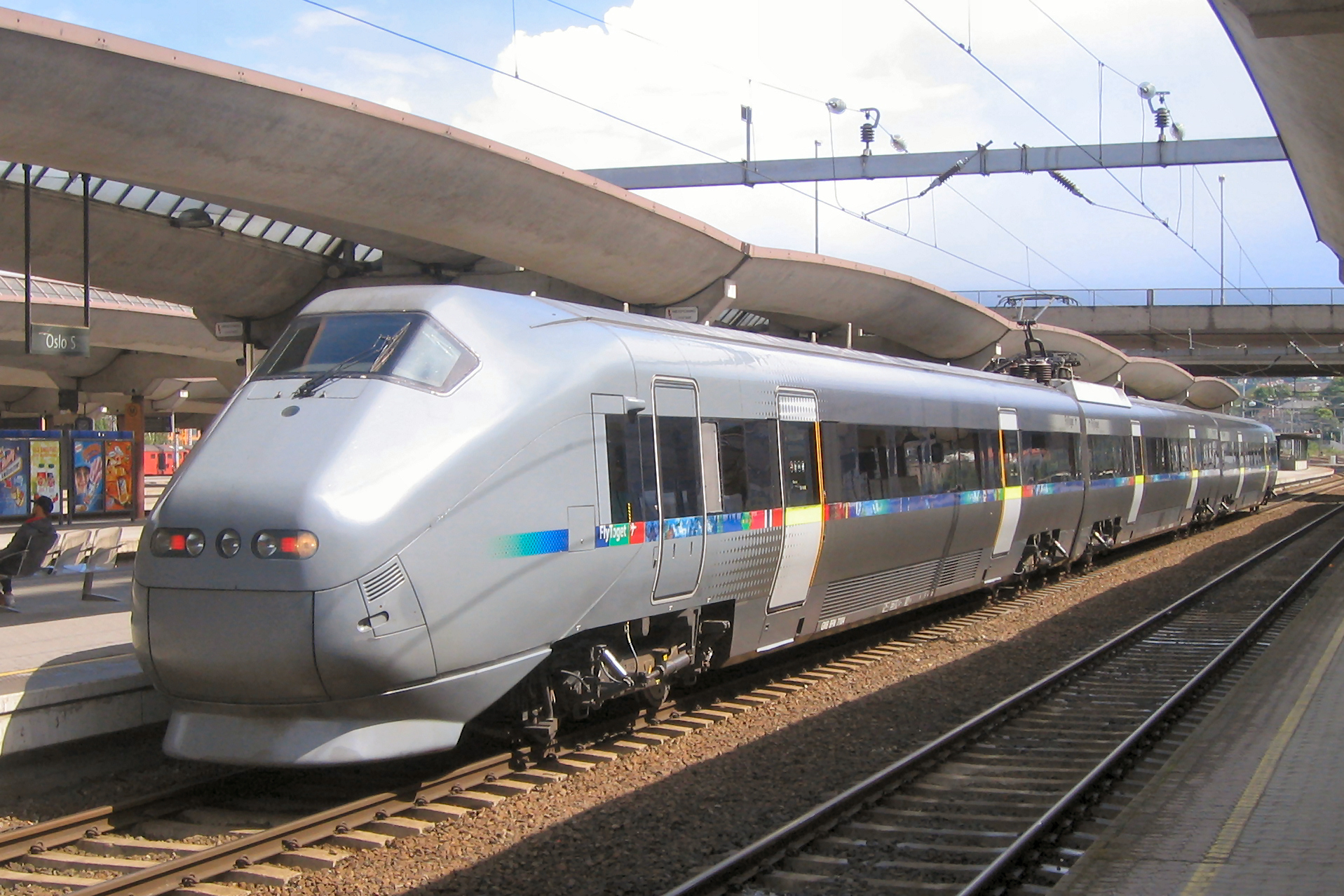
- A Class 71 Airport Express Train at Oslo Central Station.
- In service: 1998–present
- Manufacturer: Adtranz Strømmen
- Refurbished: 2008–2009
- Number built: 16 units
- Successor: Class 78
- Formation: 3 cars (as built) 4 cars (from refurbishment 2008-2009)
- Capacity: 168 seats
- Operators: Airport Express Train
- Lines served: Gardermoen Line

Specifications
- Train length: 82.3 m (270 ft 0 in)
- Car length: 27.9 m (91 ft 6 in) (ends); 26.32 m (86 ft 4 in) (centre)
- Width: 3,240 mm (10 ft 8 in)
- Height: 4,350 mm (14 ft 3 in)
- Maximum speed: 210 km/h (130 mph)
- Weight: 52 t (51 long tons; 57 short tons) (ends); 54 t (53 long tons; 60 short tons) (centre)
- Power output: 2,645 kW (3,547 hp)
- Electric system(s): 15 kV 16.7 Hz AC Catenary
- Current collector(s): Pantograph
- Track gauge: 1,435 mm (4 ft 8 1/2 in)

NSB Class 71 (Norwegian: type 71) is an electric multiple unit used by Flytoget for the Airport Express Trains on the Gardermoen Line of Norway. Sixteen three-car train sets were built by Adtranz Strømmen between 1997 and 1998. The units are capable of 210 km/h (130 mph), connecting Oslo Central Station and other stations in Metropolitan Oslo to the Oslo Airport, Gardermoen, along Norway's only high-speed railway.

In a three-car configuration, the units weigh 158 tonnes (156 long tons; 174 short tons) and are 82.3 metres (270 ft 0 in) long, with a power output of 2,645 kW (3,547 hp). The units are similar to the NSB Class 73, and are related to the Swedish X2 units. By 2009, all units were expanded with a fourth car.

== Specifications ==
The unit is based on the Swedish X2 designed by Kalmar Verkstad in the 1980s, and delivered from 1990 to the Swedish State Railways for use in their X 2000 high-speed intercity trains. Although the technology involved is similar, like spot-welded stainless steel car bodies, the Class 71 differs in several ways. First, the unit does not have a separate locomotive unit, but has the motors spread throughout the train, with one powered and one unpowered bogie in each car. The car bodies are totally different in layout, including the doors between bogies instead of at the end of the cars. In addition, the trains are pressure tight to increase comfort for passengers while passing through tunnels. They also have hydraulic couplers at the ends, which are hidden behind covers when not used. The Class 71 is also shorter, with only three cars, and does not have any tilting technology installed. The exterior design, especially the nose, is quite different. Norges Statsbaner later took order of 22 units of the Class 73, that is almost identical, but has four cars and tilting technology. Class 73's pantograph is pivoted in order to keep it centred under the catenary when the body tilts.

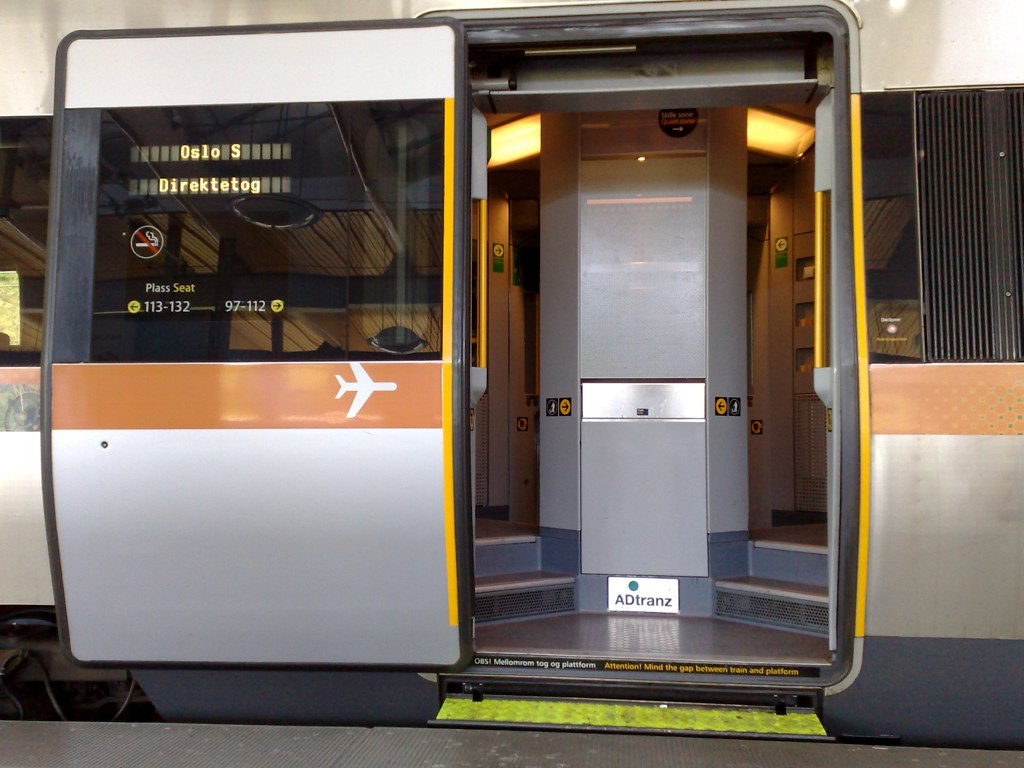
Detail of the doors, showing the inside steps

Each train has a 2,645 kW (3,550 hp) power output; this is an unusually high power to weight ratio for trains with that maximum speed. The units use the standard Norwegian voltage of 15 kV 16.7 Hz AC. Up to four units can be run in multiple, creating 12-car (or 16-car after the upgrade) trains. However, the trains normally only operate as single or double units, limiting the length to eight cars. End cars are 27.9 m (91 ft 6 in) and weigh 52 t (51 long tons; 57 short tons), while center cars are 26.32 m (86 ft 4 in) and weigh 54 t (53 long tons; 60 short tons). The pantograph is located on the center car. Each unit has 168 seats, that are built modally so that the seating can be reconfigured. The sixteen units cost 1.4 billion kr.

During construction, the weight had increased from 149 to 170 tonnes; to reduce this to 158 tonnes, the original idea of step-free access was discontinued. Instead, a wheelchair lift was installed, but it proved not to work. The area around the doors are step-free from the platform, but within the trains steps must be taken to reach the seating area. The Norwegian Federation of Organisations of Disabled People have criticized Flytoget for ordering identical additional cars that will not ease access for the disabled.

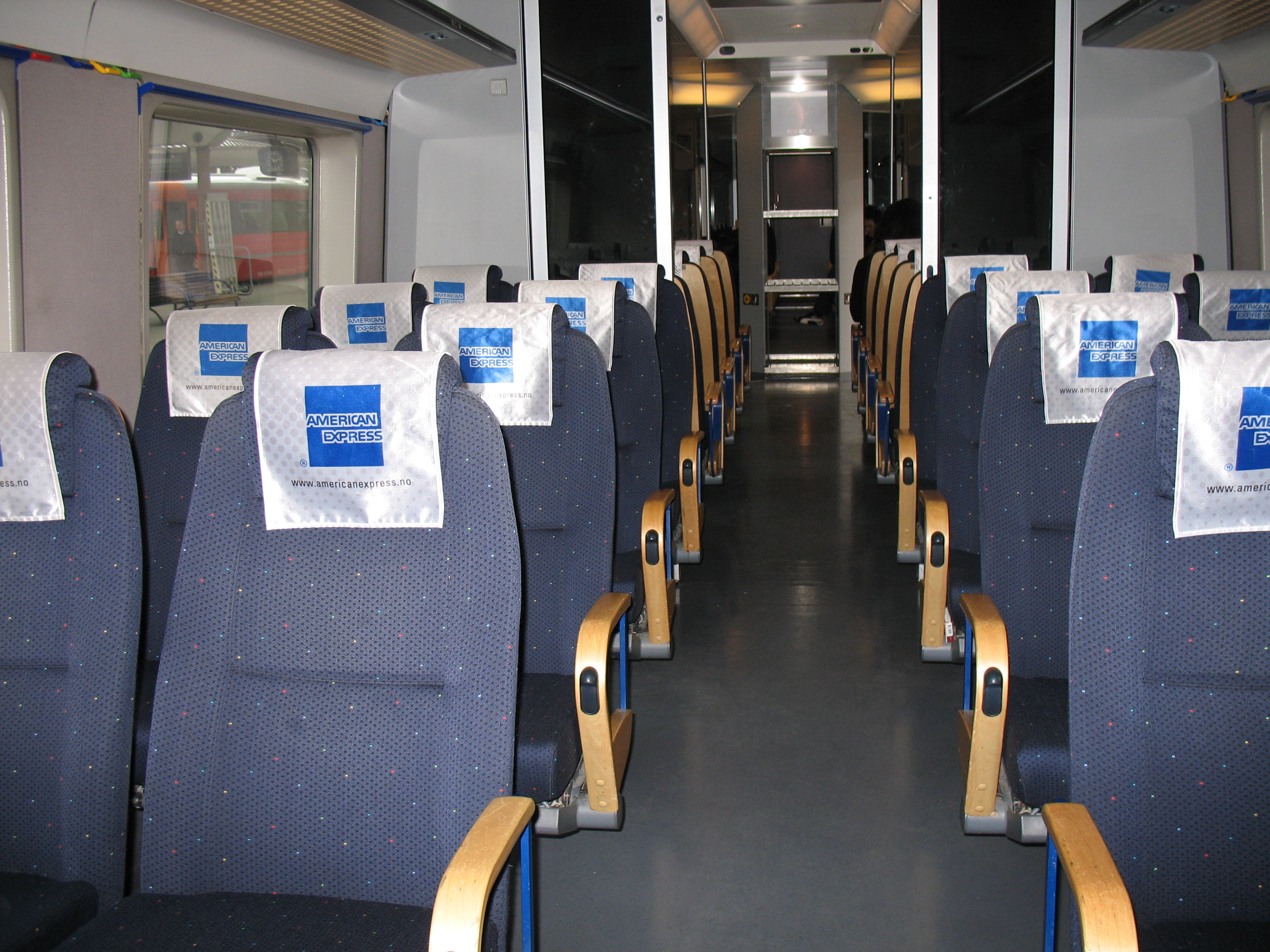
The interior of a Class 71 train

The Class 71 is capable of speeds up to 210 km/h (130 mph), compared to 200 km/h (124 mph) in the original. This speed was chosen to make it possible to get from Oslo Central Station to Oslo Airport, Gardermoen in less than 20 minutes. The signalling system ATC-2 is built for 200 km/h (124 mph), and could not be adopted for much more than that. The three car units (resp. four car units) can only be separated at a railway workshop, and are never used in anything but their native car configuration.

== History ==
When the Parliament of Norway decided to build Oslo Airport, Gardermoen, on 8 October 1992, they also decided to build a high-speed airport rail link from Oslo Central Station to the airport. This railway, the Gardermoen Line, was to be built and operated by a subsidiary of Norwegian State Railways, NSB Gardermobanen. To operate the railway they needed sixteen electric multiple units.

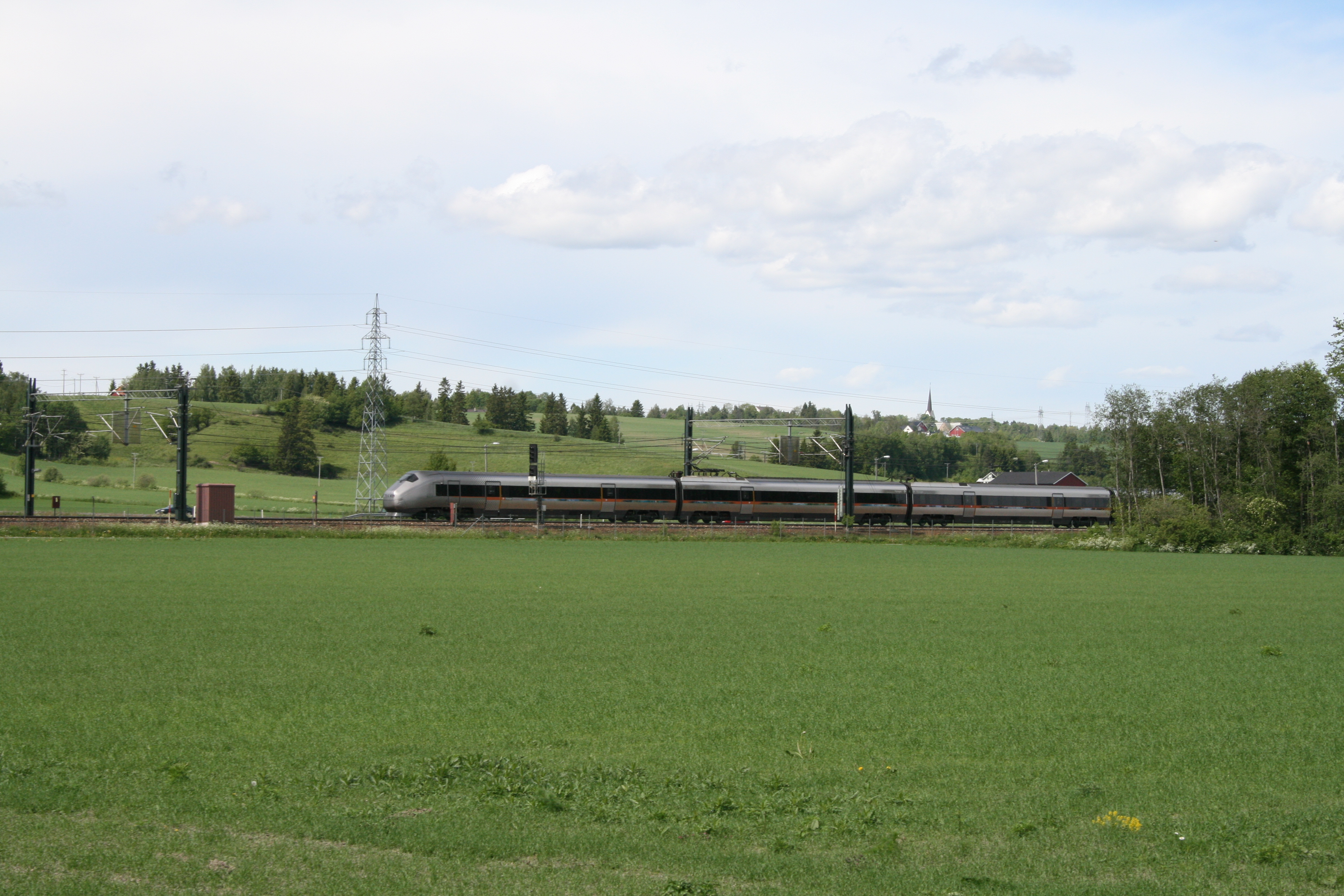
Unit operating on the Gardermoen Line

In addition to tests in Sweden, the X2 was tried out on the Randsfjord Line on 12 March 1993. The order for the units was placed on 23 February 1995, after NSB had received bids from ABB (that later merged with Daimler-Benz's train division to become Adtranz), AEG, Fiat Ferroviaria, Talbot, Linke-Hofmann-Busch, Siemens and Görlitz. During 1996, an X2 train was hired to test out performance on the Norwegian railway system, and for a short period put into service on the Sørland Line. The first Class 71 unit was delivered on 19 September 1997, and the last on 30 January 1998. The last unit, no. 71.16, was delivered with tilting mechanism to be used to test performance on the Norwegian railways, due to the similarities between Class 71 and Class 73. It could be seen during the winter on the challenging Bergen Line and Dovre Line. After a few years the tilting mechanism was removed.

In 2007, Flytoget announced that they had ordered a fourth car for each of the units. This increased the capacity of each unit by 40% to 244 seats, and allows the company to manage the annual 10% growth in passengers. The delivery of the fourth cars started in 2008 and were built by Bombardier Transportation, who has bought ADtranz, with the rebuilding scheduled to be completed during 2009. The rebuilding created several challenges for Bombardier, since most of the components used in the class were no longer available. Significant components such as the car body and rectifiers had to be built by Bombardier based on abandoned production lines, and many of the original manufacturers for the interior have become defunct.

From 2010, the Norwegian Rail School operates a simulator center for training motormen. It consists of six mock-ups of the Class 71 driver's cab, and is used both by the school and to train existing Airport Express Train drivers in exceptional circumstances. The simulators were built by Sydac and cost NOK 35 million.

== Incidents ==
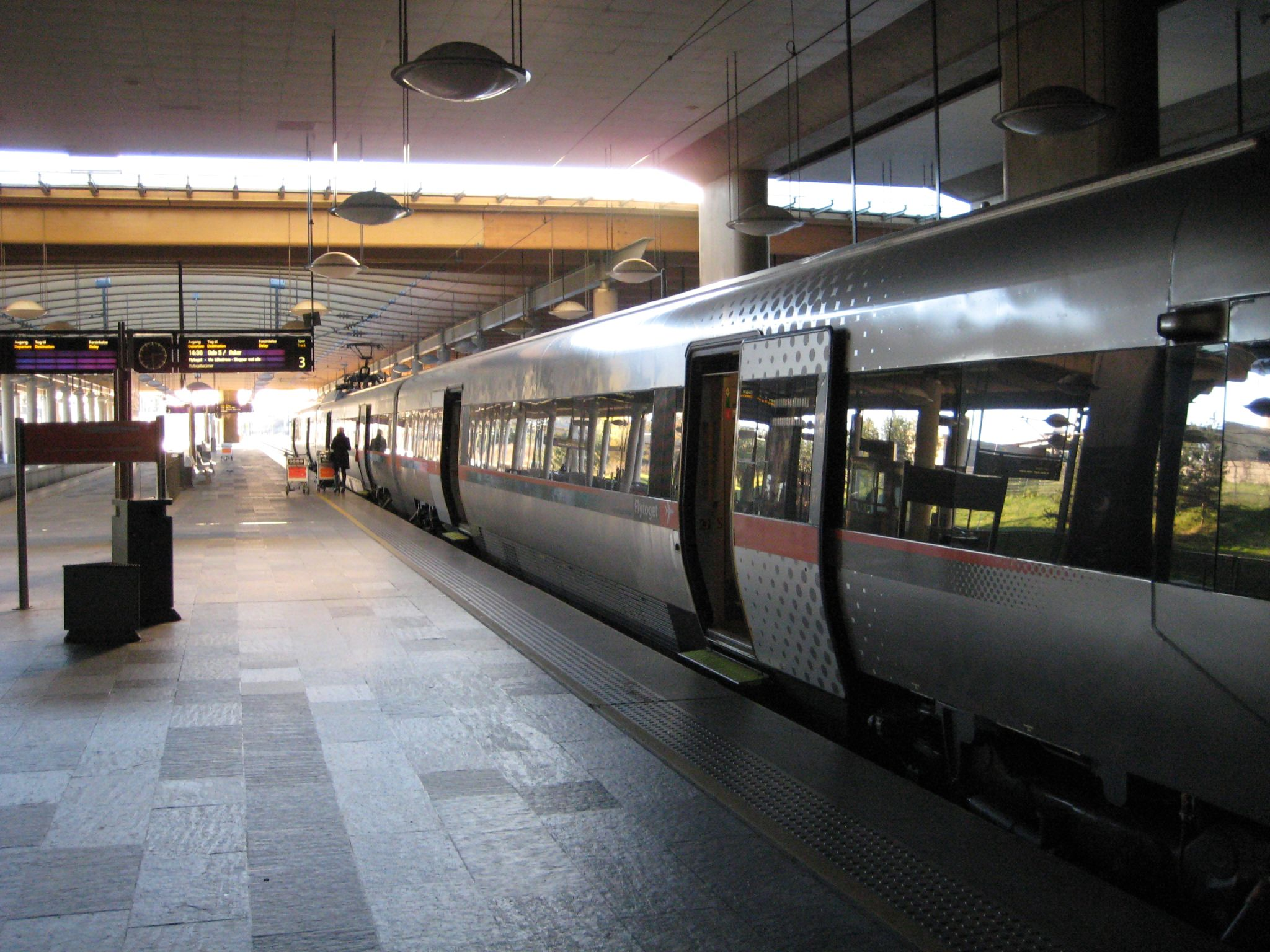
Train awaiting departure from Oslo Airport Station

The sister trains in service with NSB were prone to technical failures, since they have to operate on hundred-year-old infrastructure on cross-mountain services. The Class 71 has more lenient operating conditions thanks to better infrastructure, and therefore has not been prone to as much malfunction. The only incident to ground all the Class 71 trains occurred on 17 June 2000, after a Class 73-train operated by NSB derailed at Nelaug Station owing to stress on the axles. The Oslo Airport Express Trains were back in service the next day, while the 73-series had to wait another month before returning to service. On 24 January 2004, a Class 71 unit had to be taken out of service due to smoke from a stressed bearing, causing the replacement of the bearings on all units within days.

Several deaths have taken place on the route, but only one due to an accident. In 1999, an employee of the Norwegian National Rail Administration was killed after impact with a train; the authorities stated that the cause was due to the train operating at 160 kilometres per hour (99 mph), instead of the temporarily reduced limit of 80 kilometres per hour (50 mph). The company was fined for not informing the driver of the speed limit reduction. Several other deaths on the line have been classified as suicides, and so are not part of the accident statistics; they do however cause delays on all services for hours after the incidents take place.

In 2000 and 2001, Flytoget experienced three derailments with empty trains at Gardermoen; one caused by the engineer falling asleep and two by the train passing a red signal. No more such accidents occurred after Automatic Train Control was installed in 2001.
