= Råholt =

- Village
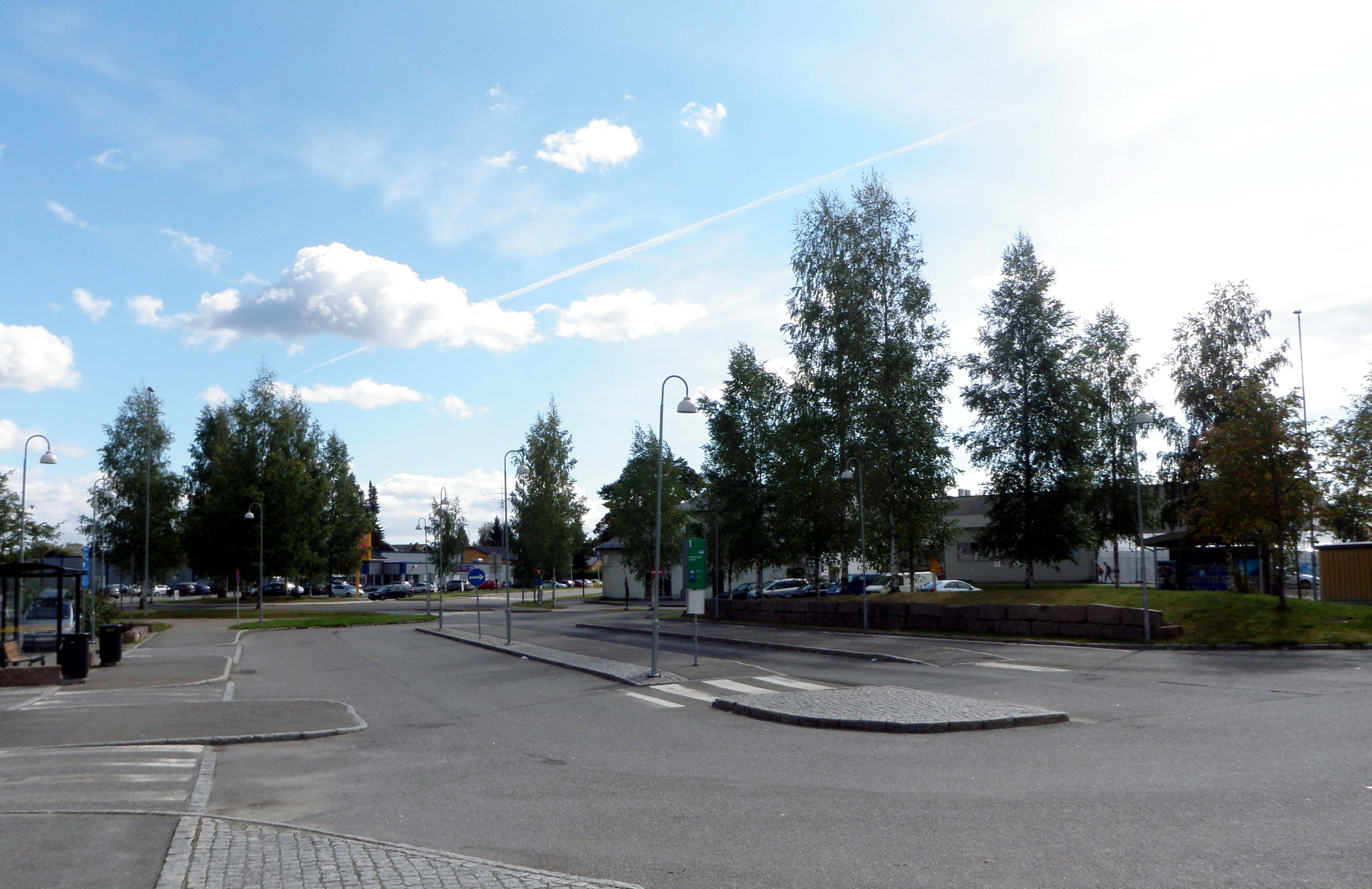
- View of the village from Eidsvoll Verk Station

- Location in Akershus
- Coordinates: 60°16′N 11°11′E
- Country: Norway
- Region: Østlandet
- County: Akershus
- Municipality: Eidsvoll
- Time zone: UTC+01:00 (CET)
  - Summer (DST): UTC+02:00 (CEST)

Råholt is a village in the municipality of Eidsvoll, Norway. It is located at an average elevation of 189 meters above the sea level. Its population (2022) is 14,830.

Following the opening of the airport at Gardermoen, Råholt has experienced, and continues to experience, expansion.

Råholt's main railway station for many residents is Eidsvoll Verk Station, located on the Gardermobanen line.
