= Eidsvoll Station =

Railway station in Eidsvoll, Norway

Eidsvoll
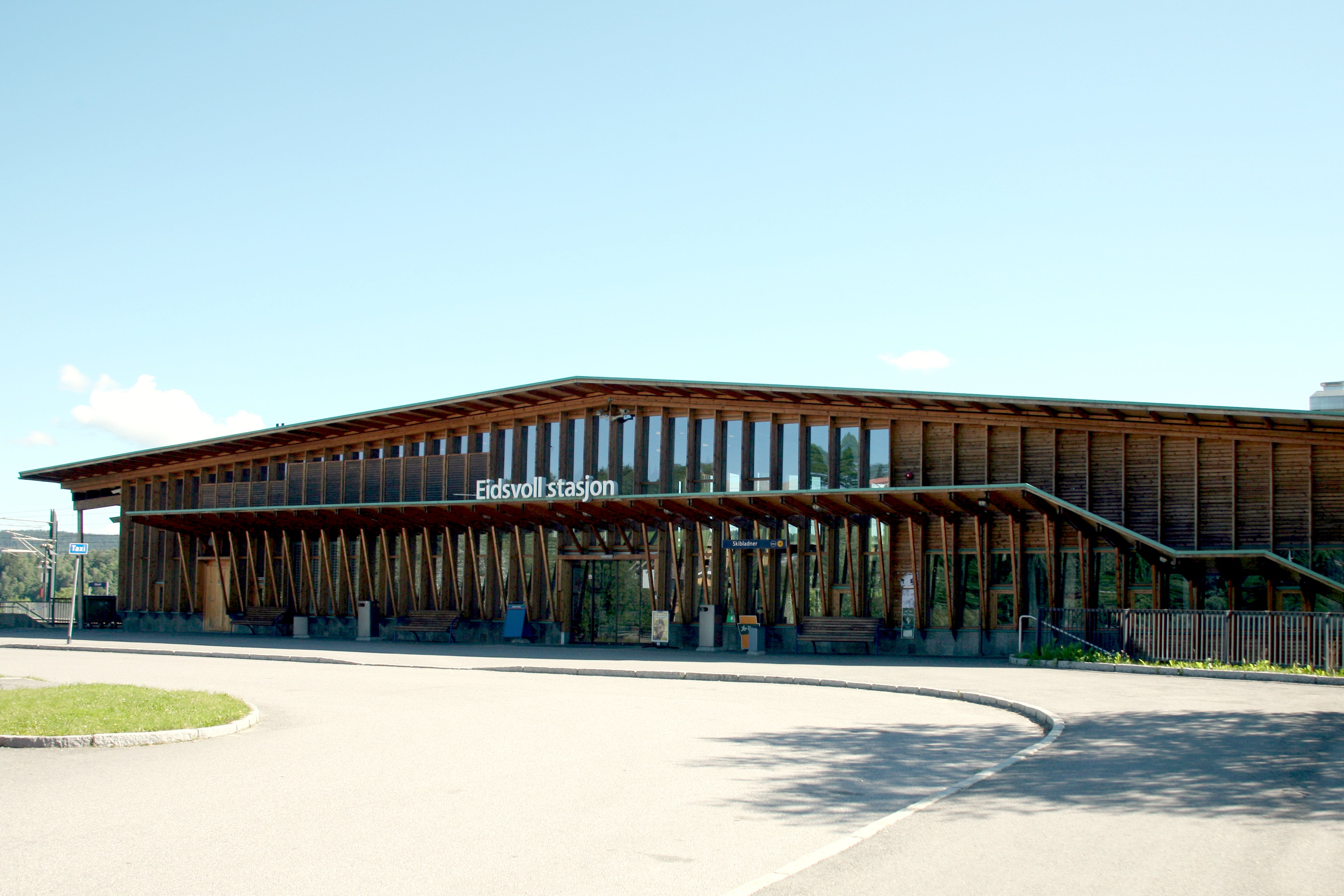

General information
- Location: Eidsvoll, Eidsvoll; Norway
- Coordinates: 60°19′47″N 11°14′52″E
- Elevation: 127.2 m (417 ft) AMSL
- Owner: Bane NOR
- Operator: Vy
- Lines: Gardermoen Line; Trunk Line; Dovre Line
- Distance: 67.51 km (41.95 mi)
- Connections: Bus: Ruter

History
- Opened: 1998
Location
- Location within Akershus

Eidsvoll is a railway station located at Eidsvoll in Akershus, Norway. The station is a terminal of the Trunk Line, the Gardermoen Line, and the Dovre Line. Even though the aforementioned lines operate as one, the station is where the lines change names. The station serves the Oslo Commuter Rail to Kongsberg and regional trains to Lillehammer, Drammen and Skien. In the summer the paddle steamer Skibladner operates from the docks at the station.

== History ==
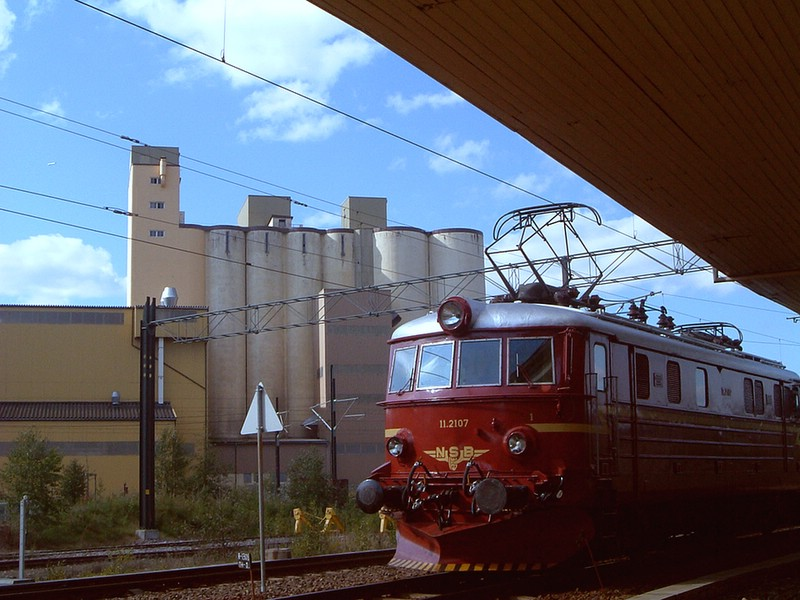
An El 11 at Eidsvoll Station

The original station was amongst Norway's first railway stations and opened in 1854. It was built as the terminus of the Trunk Line and was about 300 meters (980 ft) from the current station. When the new Gardermoen Line from Oslo via Oslo Airport, Gardermoen to Eidsvoll opened in 1998, a new station was built a short way to the north to allow it to serve both the Trunk Line and the Gardermoen Line.

Preceding station			Following station
Dal	Trunk		Terminus
Eidsvoll Verk	Gardermoen Line		Terminus
Terminus	Dovre Line		Tangen
Preceding station	Regional trains		Following station
Oslo Airport	RE10	Drammen–Oslo S–Lillehammer	Tangen
Eidsvoll Verk	RE11	Skien–Oslo S–Eidsvoll	Terminus
Preceding station	Local trains		Following station
Eidsvoll Verk	R12	Kongsberg–Oslo S–Eidsvoll	Terminus
