= Gardermoen Line =

Railway line in Norway

Coordinates: 60.1572°N 11.1447°E

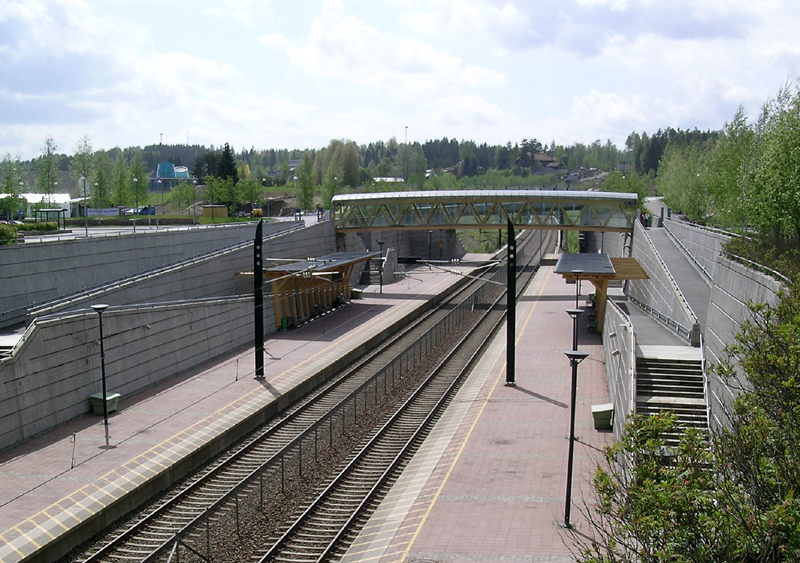
- Eidsvoll Verk Station

Overview
- Native name: Gardermobanen
- Owner: Bane NOR
- Termini: Oslo Central Station; Eidsvoll Station
- Stations: 5

Service
- Type: High-speed rail
- Operator(s): Flytoget; SJ; SJ Norge; Vy; CargoNet
- Rolling stock: El18, BM70, BM71, BM72, BM73, BM74, BM75

History
- Opened: 8 October 1998

Technical
- Line length: 64 kilometres (40 mi)
- Number of tracks: Double
- Track gauge: 1,435 mm (4 ft 8 1/2 in)
- Electrification: 15 kV 16.7 Hz AC
- Operating speed: 210 km/h (130 mph)

The Gardermoen Line (Norwegian: Gardermobanen) is a high-speed railway line between Oslo and Eidsvoll, Norway, running past Lillestrøm and Oslo Airport, Gardermoen. The line is 64 kilometres (40 mi) long and replaced the older Hoved Line as the main line north-east of Oslo. The older Hoved Line now handles commuter and freight traffic, while the Gardermoen Line handles high-speed passenger trains and freight trains laden with jet fuel for the airport. Both lines are owned by Bane NOR.

The line was opened in 1998, at the same time as the airport that gave the line its name. It is used by the Flytoget airport express train service as well as express trains by Vy. It is the only high-speed railway in Norway, with a maximum permitted speed of 210 km/h (130 mph). Most of the line between Oslo and Lillestrøm passes through the 14.580-kilometre-long (9.060 mi; 15,945 yd) Romeriksporten tunnel—the second longest railway tunnel in Norway. The decision to build the line was made in 1992; construction started two years later. The line faced severe criticism during construction when the Romerike Tunnel sprung severe leaks due to hurried construction. As a result, the tunnel was opened a year after the rest of the line.

== History ==
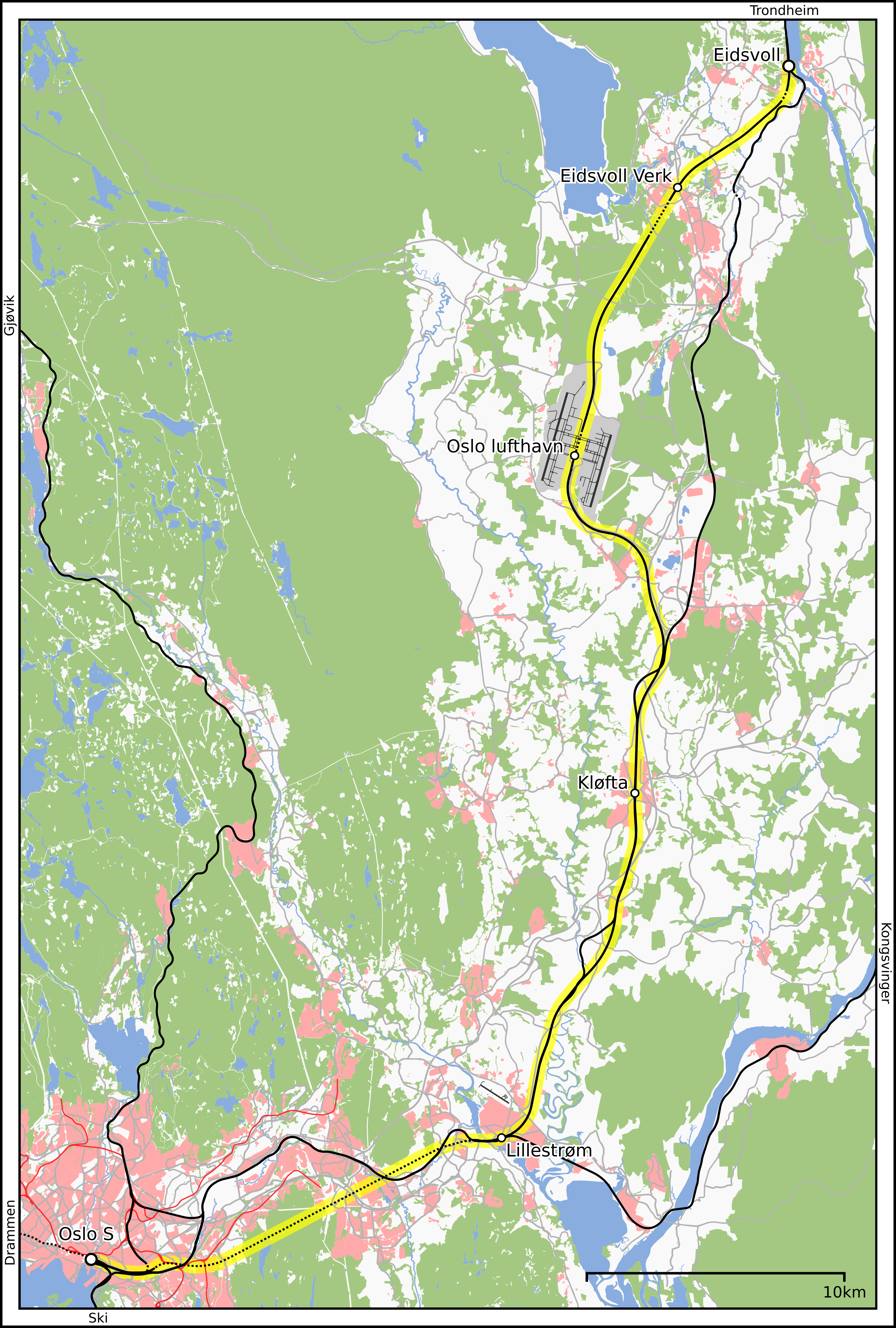
Map of the Gardermoen Line

When the Parliament of Norway decided on 8 October 1992 to build a new central airport for Eastern Norway, they also decided that the main mode of ground transport to the airport should be by railway. While the previous airport, Oslo Airport, Fornebu, was located just outside the city limits; the new Oslo Airport, Gardermoen, would be located some 50 kilometers north of the city, outside the reach of the existing public transport systems. The political agreement to build the airport stated that the costs of construction should not be borne by the taxpayers. As a result, the entire airport was financed with money borrowed through Oslo Lufthavn AS, a subsidiary of the Norwegian Airport Administration. The same principle was chosen for the airport rail link. The Norwegian State Railways (NSB) created the subsidiary, NSB Gardermobanen AS, on 24 November 1992 to carry out the construction of the line. This company would be able to charge train operators using the railway line; and could use this income to cover its down payments and interest on the debt created to pay for the infrastructure investment. It was planned to give a profit margin of 7.5%.

In 1996 NSB Gardermoen stated that they expected to charge commuter and intercity trains 100 million Norwegian krone per year to use the new line. County politicians in Akershus stated that it was not reasonable for commuters to have to pay for the new railway. Early estimates showed that this would almost double to fare from Oslo to Eidsvoll, and that passengers would have different prices, depending on which route they followed. The state-owned Stor-Oslo Lokaltrafikk, which was responsible for operating buses in Akershus, stated that they had no way to influence NSB's prices, but that they would consider starting a coach service along the route, which would not charge the surcharge.

=== Construction ===
Construction of the railway started on 1 August 1994. Gardermoen is located about 50 kilometres (31 mi) north of Oslo, but is not located on the Hoved Line. A different right-of-way had to be chosen north of Kløfta. The Hoved Line has heavy traffic, with many small stops until Lillestrøm, and continues northwards from Lillestrøm as single track. Therefore, an all-new railway would have to be built; it would bypass the intermediate railway until Lillestrøm, running through a tunnel, and continue northwards to the airport and onwards to Eidsvoll. This northernmost part is 16 kilometres (9.9 mi) used to allow trains operating on the Dovre Line to Lillehammer and Trondheim to use the Gardermoen Line.

The Gardermoen Line was the second attempt to build a high-speed railway in Norway. The first was the 35-kilometre (22 mi) line from Ski to Moss on the Østfold Line. However, operational speeds in excess of 160 kilometres per hour (99 mph) could not be achieved due to the short distances and limitations on rolling stock. The Gardermoen Line, therefore, became the first real high-speed railway line in Norway. Due to the domination of single track in Norway, the 64-kilometre (40 mi) Gardermoen Line increased the total length of double track in the kingdom by more than 50%.

The projected costs of the railway line were NOK 4.3 billion ±20%. Total costs ended at NOK 7.7 billion, including 1.3 billion extra used on extraordinary expenditures on the Romeriksporten. On 1 October 1996 it was decided that the construction company, NSB Gardermobanen, would also become the operator of the airport express train. However, due to limited profitability with the company, from 1 January 2001 the ownership of Gardermobanen was transferred to the Norwegian National Rail Administration, who also owns the rest of railway lines in Norway. The operating company changed its name to Flytoget AS.

=== Construction challenges ===
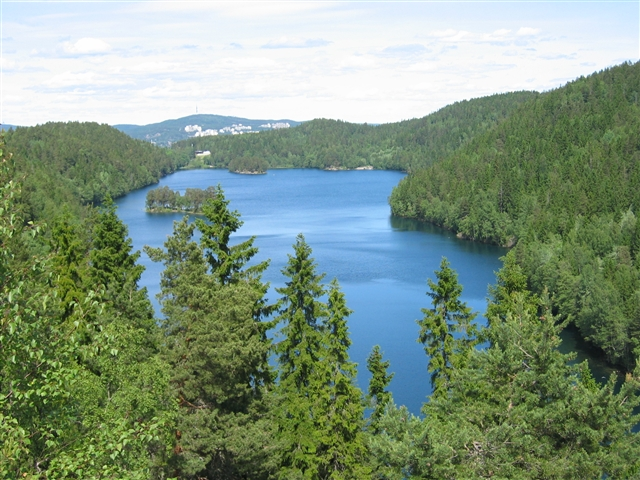
The lake Lutvann was severely depleted due to complications during the construction of Romeriksporten.

The most challenging part of the construction was the 14,580 metres (47,830 ft) railway tunnel from Etterstad, just east of Oslo S, to Lillestrøm. Romeriksporten is the second longest railway tunnel in Norway, and is underneath the recreational area Østmarka, in geologically highly unstable ground. During the construction in 1997, the water level in some of the lakes above the tunnel, including Lutvann and Nordre Puttjern, fell dramatically. After they were discovered on 3 February 1997 sanctions were initiated by the Norwegian Water Resources and Energy Directorate requiring leakage prevention measures in the tunnel. At the worst, 3,000 liters of water per minute leaked into the tunnel.

The substance Rhoca-Gil was used to fix the leakages, but the substance failed to work properly. Not only did it fail to polymerize and stop the leaks, it also contaminated the surroundings with acrylamide. The entire process of fixing the leak and cleaning up the toxicity delayed the process of building the tunnel by one year; and it was first opened on 22 August 1999. Further complications arose due to conflicts between NSB Gardermobanen and the construction company. Retrospective surveys showed a lack of control and reporting procedures during incidents that should have been addressed in 1995, and were never taken seriously. About sixty houses received damage due to the construction of the tunnel. An evaluation performed by the Ministry of Transport and Communications showed that NOK 500 million was used on fixing the leaks; however, the report claimed this was, to a large extent, a waste of money due to inefficient engineering procedures. The same report criticized the planning and organization of the entire construction of the railway.

=== Opening ===
When the new airport opened on 8 October 1998, and the Flytoget airport express train service started operations with sixteen Type 71 multiple units. Trains had to use the old Hoved Line from Oslo S to Lillestrøm, but could use the new high-speed line from Lillestrøm to Gardermoen. Regular operations using Romeriksporten started on 22 August 1999. To be able to use the new Gardermoen Line infrastructure, Norges Statsbaner had to buy new trains capable of higher speeds. Twenty-two locomotive designated El 18, based on the Swiss lok 2000, were delivered in 1996. They are capable of speeds of up to 200 kilometres per hour (120 mph). However, the B7 passenger carriages used are not permitted to operate at more than 150 kilometres per hour (93 mph). Full speed utilization of long-distance trains is only possible with the Type 73 units that started operation on the Dovre Line in 2000. These trains are nearly identical to those used by the Flytoget airport express train company, and capable of 210 kilometres per hour (130 mph) on the Gardermoen Line. They are equipped with tilting technology allowing quicker operation on the rest of the line to Trondheim. Other trains used on the line by NSB are only capable of 160 kilometres per hour (99 mph).

=== Future expansion ===
Plans for an expansion of the high-speed line to Hamar have been launched, but have not been incorporated into any specific plans. This suggestion would increase the length of the high-speed rail north of Oslo with 62 kilometres (39 mi)—almost a doubling. The project may or may not incorporate a further high-speed line to Trondheim.

== Operations ==
The railway is used by both Vy, Flytoget, SJ and SJ Norge for their passenger services, as well as freight trains with jet fuel for the airport.

=== Airport express train ===
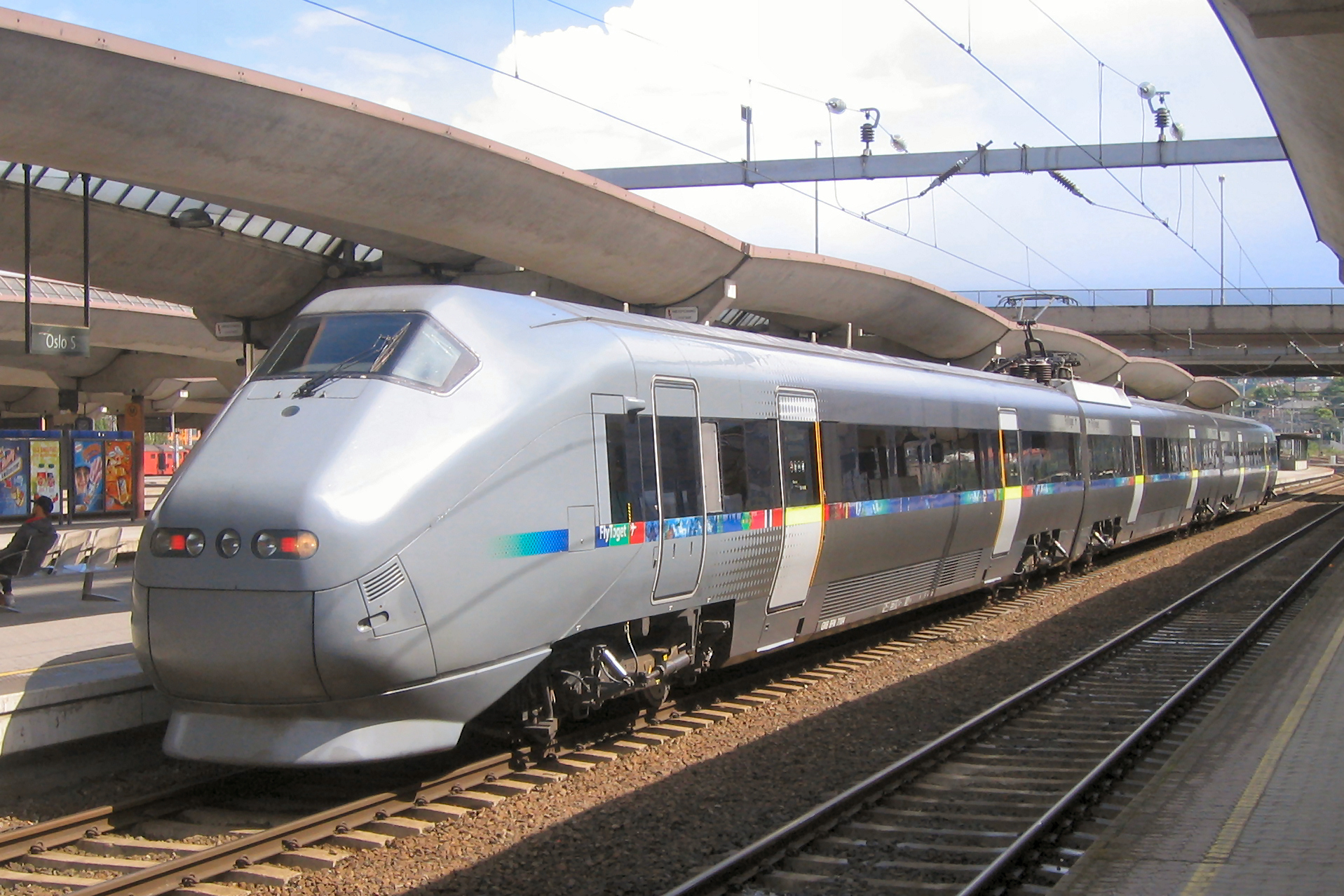
A BM71 Airport Express Train ready for departure from Oslo S.

The Flytoget airport express train service is the largest user of the Gardermoen Line, with six departures from Oslo Central to Oslo Airport per hour. The trains only use the line as far as Gardermoen, and not the northernmost sixteen kilometers. Service is provided using sixteen Type 71 three-car units, which together transported 5.4 million passengers in 2007. Direct services to Oslo S take 19 minutes. Half of the services make an intermediate stop at Lillestrøm, and continue on past Oslo Central to Asker Station. Flytoget has a 34% market share on ground transport to Oslo Airport.

=== Vy ===
Vy (formerly NSB) uses Gardermeon Line for regional trains north of Oslo. The line is operated by two regional services, the R10 service between Drammen and Lillehammer, the R11 service between Skien/Larvik and Eidsvoll, as well as the local service, L12 between Kongsberg and Eidsvoll. These services is carried out with Type 74 for R10 and R11, and Type 75 for line L12. Both trains are capable of 200 km/h (120 mph) operation. The southernmost part of the line is used by commuter trains heading to the Kongsvinger Line. These trains divert from the Gardermoen Line at Lillestrøm. Also the commuter trains operating to Dal along the Hoved Line use the Gardermoen Line until Lillestrøm.

=== Other services ===
Because there is a parallel line, the Hoved Line running all the way from Oslo S to Eidsvoll, some trains can choose to use this line instead. This is primarily done by some commuter trains, as well as all freight trains. The only exception to this are trains hauling jet fuel to the airport, which have to use the Gardermoen Line from Kløfta. This service is provided by CargoNet.

The Swedish state railways, SJ also operate on the southern part of Gardermoen on their intercity services with SJ 3000 and loco-hauled Rc6 trains. This was for some years provided by Linx, a joint venture between SJ and NSB, using modified X2 stock, but the company was later dissolved.

SJ Norge (the Norwegian branch of the Swedish state railways) also uses the full line for 5 daily express services to Trondheim Station, these are in form of Type 73 tilting electric multiple units and loco-hauled El 18 trains. Due to a bridge collapsing, there are fewer direct trains to Trondheim, being in form of Type 76 bi-modal multiple units that take a detour via Røros Station.

== Stations ==
Station	Distance	Opened
Oslo Central Station	0.00 km	1854
Lillestrøm	20.95 km	1854
Oslo Airport	51.85 km	1998
Eidsvoll Verk	63.30 km	1998
Eidsvoll	67.51 km	1998

== See also ==
- High-speed rail in Norway
