= Oslo Airport Station =

Railway station in Ullensaker, Norway

Oslo Airport Gardermoen Station
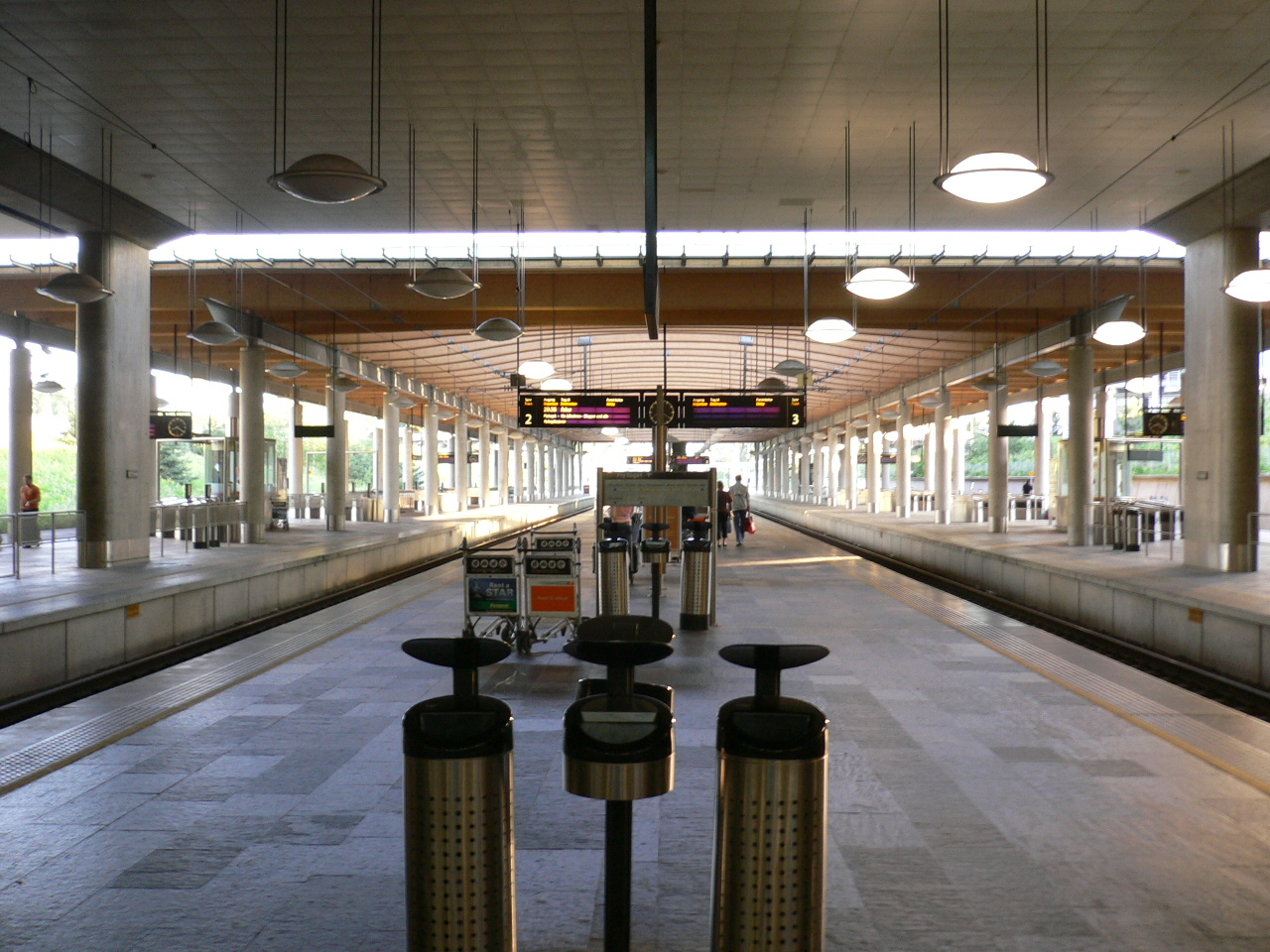
- Airport Express Train platform

General information
- Location: Gardermoen, Ullensaker; Norway
- Coordinates: 60°11′38″N 11°06′02″E
- Elevation: 202 m (663 ft)
- Owner: Bane NOR
- Operator: Airport Express Train; Vy; SJ Norge
- Line: Gardermoen Line
- Distance: 51.85 km (32.22 mi)
- Platforms: 4
- Connections: Oslo Airport, Gardermoen; Bus: Ruter 855

Other information
- Station code: GAR

History
- Opened: 27 September 1998
Location
- Location within Akershus

Oslo Airport Station (Norwegian: Oslo lufthavn stasjon), also known as Gardermoen Station, is a railway station located in the airport terminal building of Oslo Airport, Gardermoen in Norway. Located on the Gardermoen Line, it is served by the Airport Express Trains, express trains to Trondheim and Oslo, regional trains to Lillehammer and Skien (via Oslo) and commuter trains to Eidsvoll and Kongsberg (via Oslo).

The station is located 48 kilometres (30 mi) from Oslo Central Station. The station is staffed, and there is a single bus route, and several coach services, to and from the airport. It opened in 1998, along with the new airport. During 2000–2001, there were several derailments at the station. South of the station is a terminal for unloading freight trains carrying aviation fuel.

== Location ==
Gardermoen is at kilometer marker 51.85 (32.22 mi) from Oslo S, but the actual distance is only 48.07 km (29.87 mi). This is because the distance markers follow the slightly longer Hoved Line between Oslo and Lillestrøm. The station is built directly below the airport terminal, and access is obtained via escalators or elevators located in the airport's arrival hall. North of the station, the tracks run in a tunnel below the terminal and runway area. The tracks on platforms 2 and 3 only have connection southwards; north of the station they are only connected to a short turning track.

Aviation fuel is transported to the airport by train. CargoNet hauls a daily train load of fuel from Sjursøya, with an unloading terminal just south of the passenger station. They are the only freight trains to use the Gardermoen Line.

== Services ==
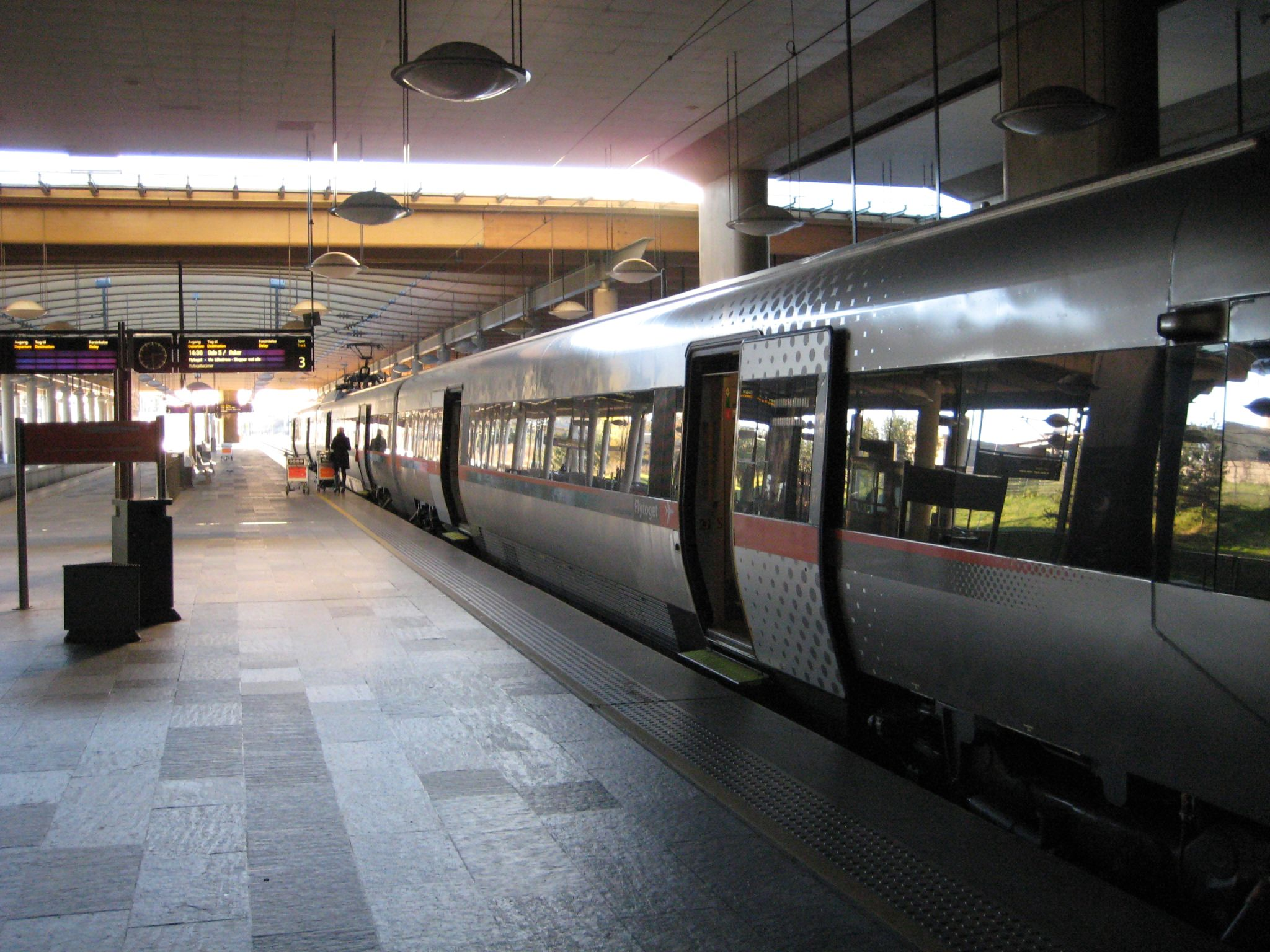
Airport Express Train

Services are provided by Vy, Flytoget Airport Express, and SJ Norge. The outer side platforms (1 and 4) serve VY and SJ Norge trains, while the two inner island platforms (2 and 3) serve Flytoget trains.

The station is staffed from 07:00 to 22:00 on weekdays, with reduced opening hours on weekends. The platform (but not necessarily the trains) are wheelchair accessible, and an escort service for disabled persons can be prebooked. Baggage trolleys are available, and a wide selection of services, including cafes, kiosks, banks, taxis, and police, are available at the airport terminal. A single local bus route, Ruter no. 855, also serves the airport from Kløfta, Jessheim and Maura. There are many coaches from all parts of the country that also serve the airport, as well as coach services to Oslo operated by Flybussekspressen and SAS Ground Services.

=== Flytoget Airport Express ===
There are two service patterns used for Flytoget Airport Express trains. There is a local pattern to Drammen Station and an express pattern only calling at Oslo Central Station and the airport. Both service patterns run with 20 minute headways, resulting in a 10 minute frequency from the airport to Oslo Central. In 2007, the Airport Express Train had 5.35 million passengers.

Station	Distance	Time
Lillestrøm	30.90 km	12 min
Oslo Central Station	48.07 km	19 / 22 min
Nationaltheatret	49.50 km	27 min
Skøyen	52.43 km	32 min
Lysaker	55.07 km	34 min
Sandvika	62.24 km	42 min
Asker	71.93 km	48 min
Drammen	100.96 km	60 min

=== Vy ===
Vy operates three different services to Oslo Airport. Two of these services are regional expresses to Drammen, Lillehammer, Skien, and Eidsvoll. A third service is a part of the Oslo Commuter Rail network, running between Eidsvoll and Kongsberg. Each service operates hourly.

=== SJ Norge ===
Long-distance trains between Oslo S and Trondheim S operated by SJ Norge on the Dovre Line call at Oslo Airport. These consist of five express trains and one night train with sleeper accomodation.

== History ==
The decision to build the station, railway and airport was taken by the Parliament on 8 October 1992. NSB Gardermobanen, a subsidiary of the Norwegian State Railways, was created to build the line and station, as well as operate the Flytoget airport express train services. Construction of the station was performed in parallel with the construction of the airport, and the station is built in the same style as the rest of the airport, in postmodernist concrete and wood.

The station was taken into use on 27 September 1998, and public services commenced along with the opening of the airport on 8 October 1998. In 2001, as part of a reorganization of NSB Gardermobanen, the ownership of the station was transferred to the Norwegian National Rail Administration.

=== Incidents ===
In 2000–01, the Airport Express Train experienced three derailments with empty trains at Gardermoen; one caused by the engineer falling asleep and two by the train passing a red light. No more such accidents occurred after automatic train control was installed in 2001.

Preceding station	Express trains		Following station
Lillestrøm towards Oslo S		F6	Hamar towards Trondheim S
Preceding station	Regional trains		Following station
Lillestrøm	RE10	Drammen–Oslo S–Lillehammer	Eidsvoll
Lillestrøm	RE11	Skien–Oslo S–Eidsvoll	Eidsvoll Verk
Preceding station	Flytoget		Following station
Lillestrøm towards Drammen		FLY1	Terminus
Oslo S towards Stabekk		FLY2	Terminus
Preceding station	Local trains		Following station
Lillestrøm	R12	Kongsberg–Oslo S–Eidsvoll	Eidsvoll Verk
