= Kongsberg Station =

Railway station in Kongsberg, Norway

Kongsberg
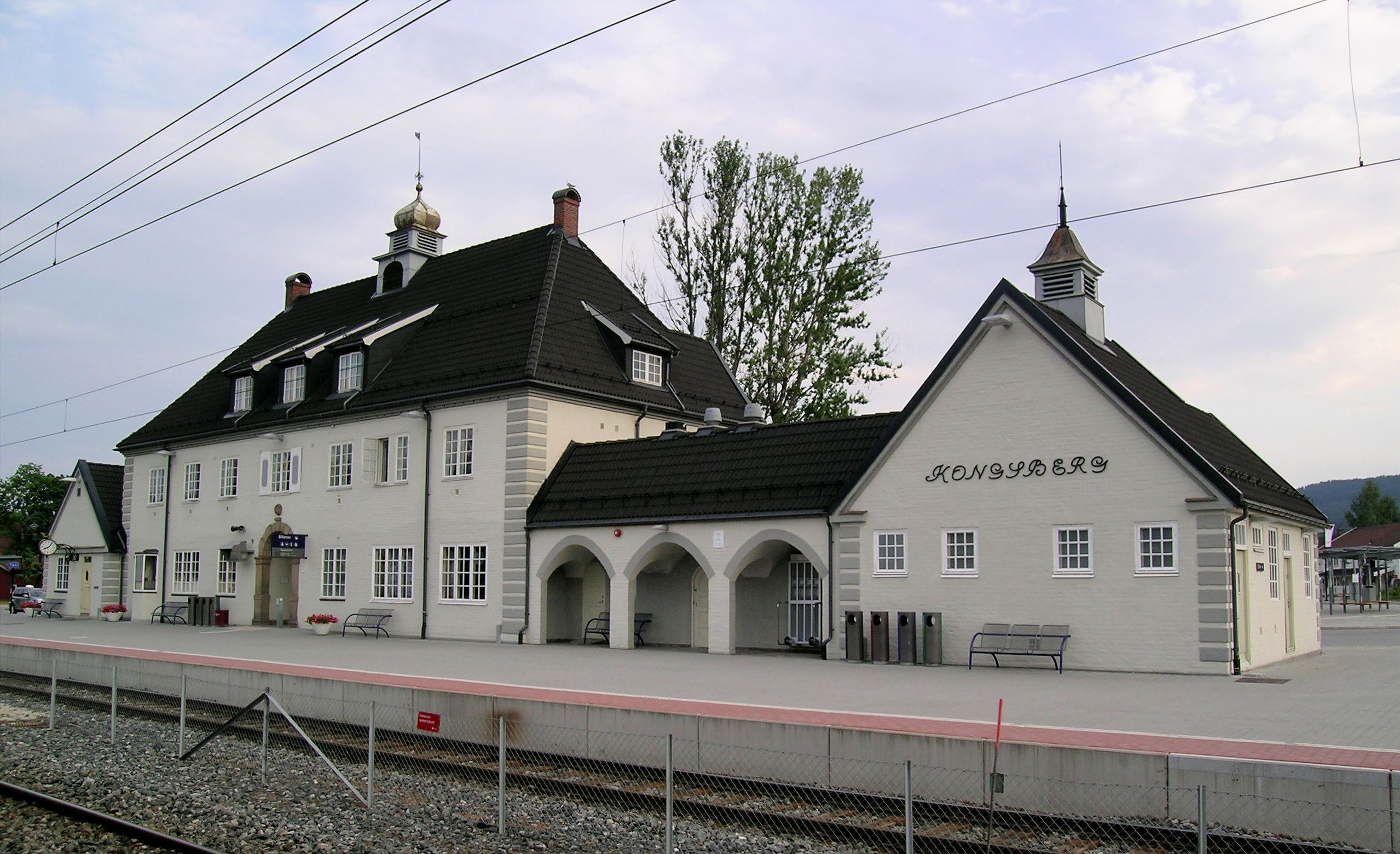

General information
- Location: Kongsberg, Kongsberg Municipality; Norway
- Coordinates: 59.67227°N 9.650631°E
- Elevation: 161.9 m (531 ft)
- Operator: Go-Ahead Norge; Vy
- Line: Sørlandet Line
- Distance: 99.37 km (61.75 mi)
- Platforms: 2
- Connections: Bus: Brakar; Vy express

Other information
- Station code: KBG

History
- Opened: 1917
Location

Kongsberg Station (Norwegian: Kongsberg stasjon) is a railway station on the Sørlandet Line that is located in downtown Kongsberg in Kongsberg Municipality in Buskerud county, Norway. The station is served by express trains to Kristiansand and is the terminus of the L12 line from Oslo and Eidsvoll.

== History ==
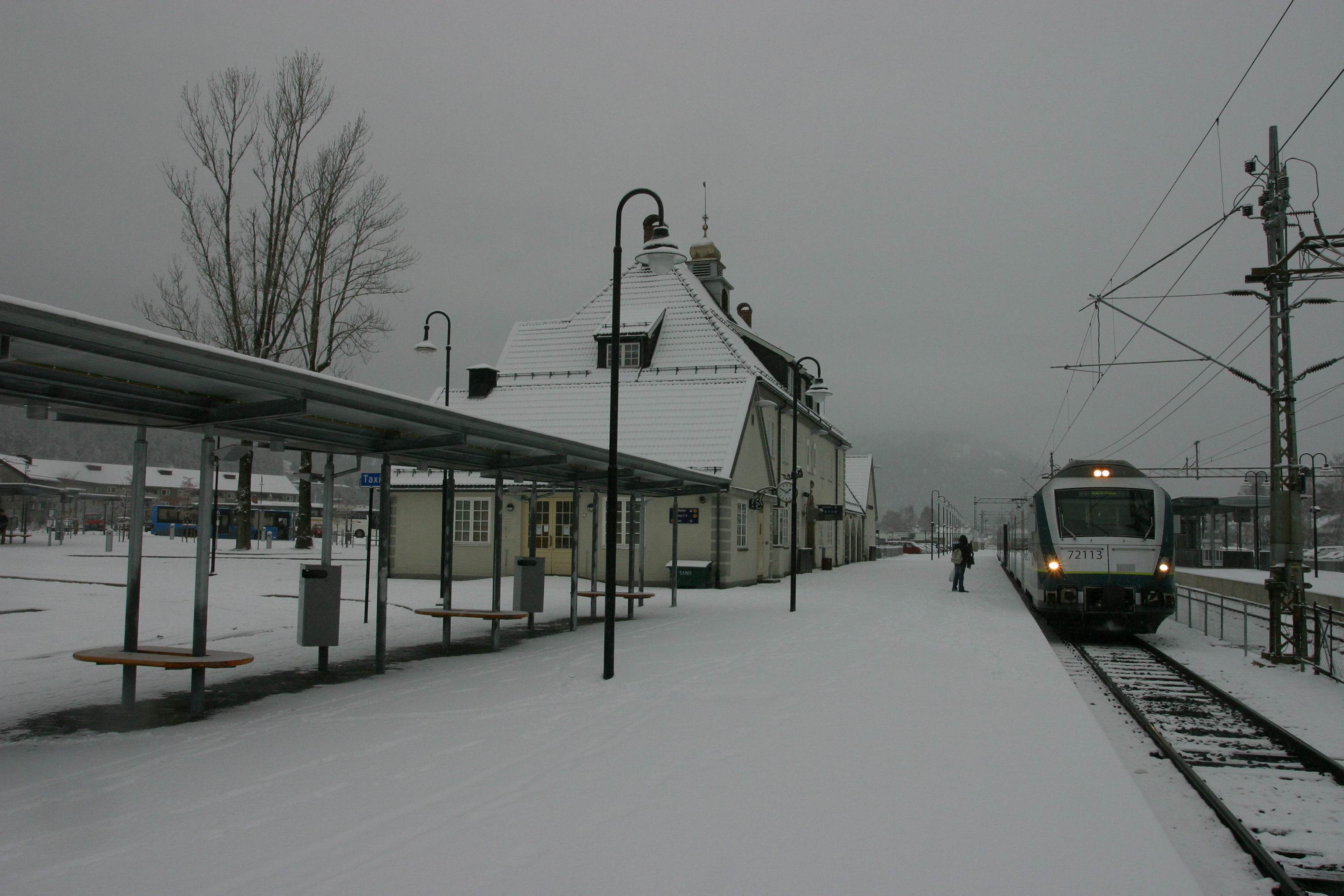
A local Class 72 train at Kongsberg Station

The first station at Kongsberg opened in 1871 when the branch line of the Randsfjord Line from Hokksund to Kongsberg was completed. The present station dates from 1917 with the construction of the Sørland Line and was drawn by Gudmund Hoel and N. W. Grimnes. The station was preserved by the Norwegian Directorate for Cultural Heritage in 1997.

The restaurant was taken over by Norsk Spisevognselskap in on 1 November 1944.

Preceding station	Express trains	Following station
Nordagutu towards Stavanger	F5	Drammen towards Oslo S
Preceding station	Regional trains	Following station
Terminus	R12	Darbu towards Eidsvoll
