= Hallandsås Tunnel =

Railway Tunnel

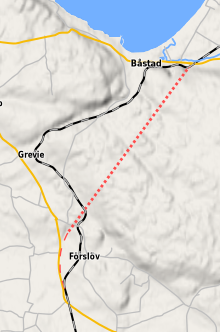
- The red, dotted line shows the tunnel. The red-white dashed line shows new, connecting railway, and the black-white dashed line shows the previous railway stretch.
- Interactive map of Hallandsås Tunnel

Overview
- Line: West Coast Line
- Location: Båstad Municipality, Skåne County
- Status: Open
- Start: Förslöv 56°21′43″N 12°48′20″E
- End: Båstad 56°25′28″N 12°53′20″E

Operation
- Work began: 1992 (restart 2003)
- Opened: 8 December 2015
- Traffic: Railway

Technical
- Length: 8.7 km (5.4 mi)

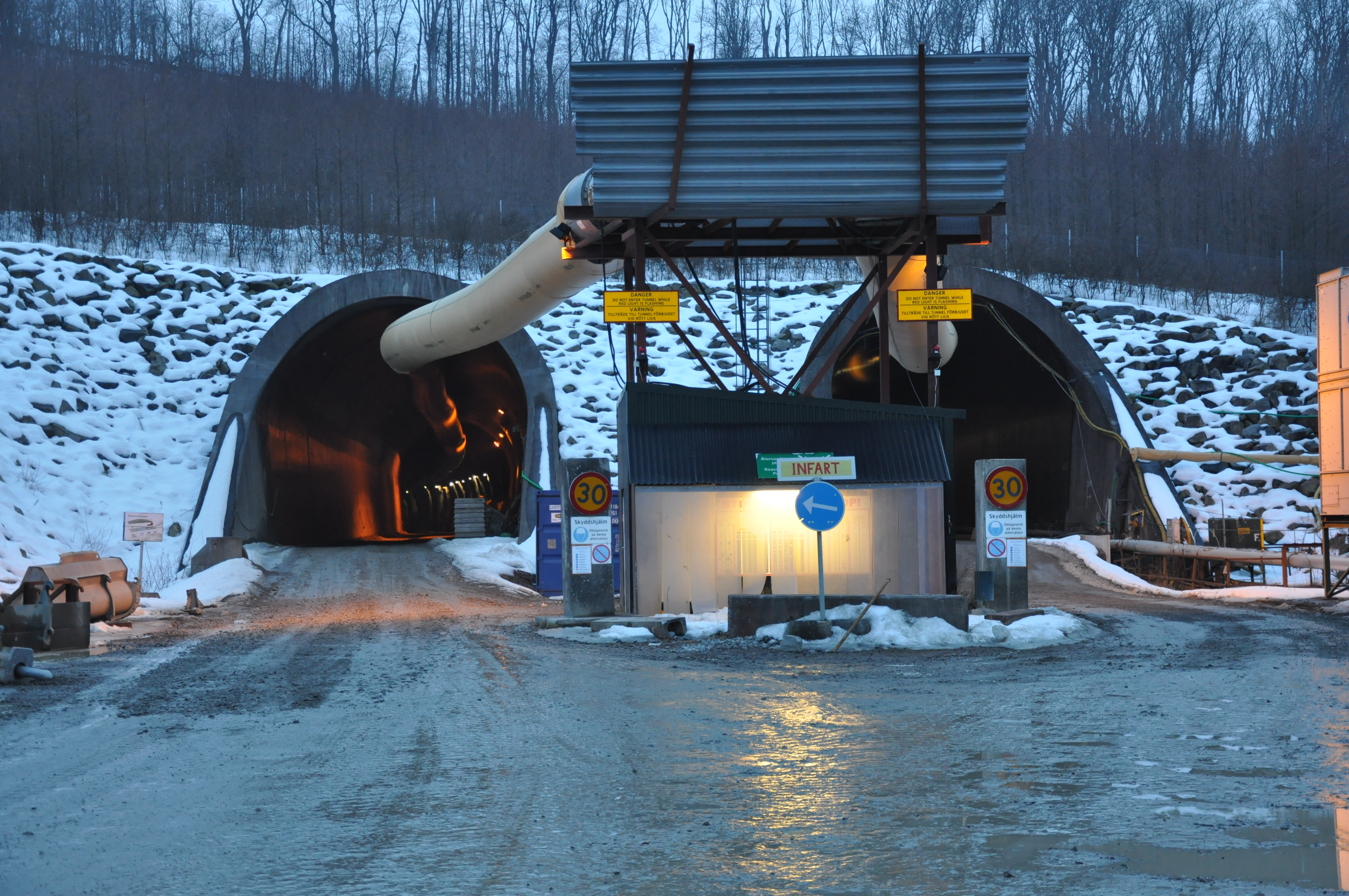
The northern opening of the Hallandsås tunnels.

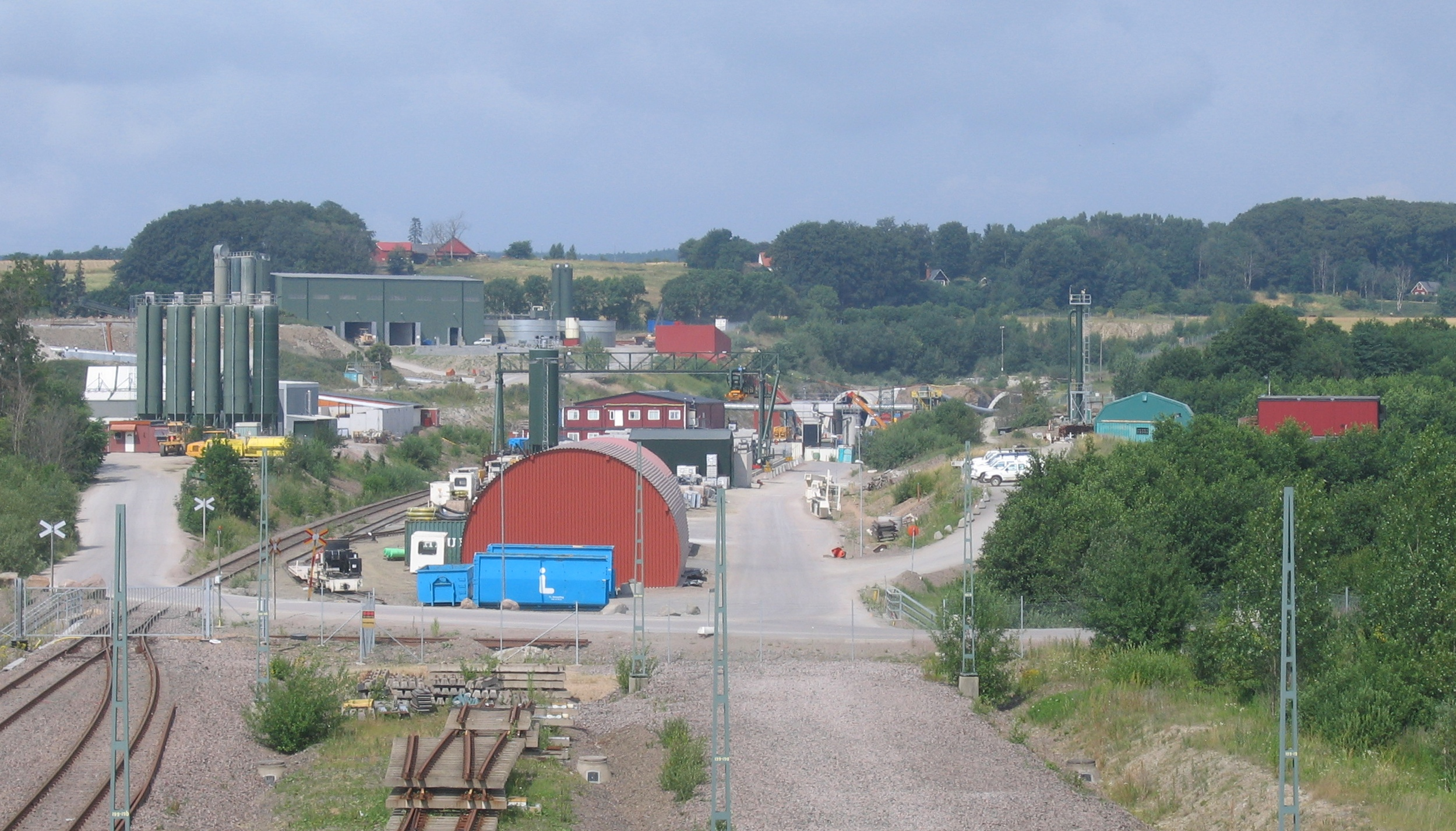
The southern construction site; one of the two tunnel entrances can be seen in the background.

The Hallandsås Tunnel (Swedish: Hallandsåstunneln), also known as the Hallandsås Ridge Tunnel or Scanlink, is a railway tunnel in Sweden. It connects the northern and the southern sides of the Hallandsås geological formation (a horst). The length is 8.7 km (5.4 mi) (8,722 metres (28,615 ft) in one bore, 8,710 metres (28,576 ft) in the other). It's utilised by the West Coast Line, on the section between Ängelholm and Halmstad in southwestern Sweden. It has improved the connection between the cities of Gothenburg, Sweden, and Copenhagen, Denmark. In the longer term it will be a key component in the proposed Oslo to Hamburg high speed rail link via Gothenburg, Malmö and Copenhagen.

The project was troubled by construction difficulties caused by groundwater ingress, and a scandal when dangerous sealant materials were used causing workers to become ill and killing local fish and cattle. These caused the project to be halted from late 1997 to 2005, and resulted in large cost over-runs. The project was finished in December 2015, over 23 years after start of construction.

== Background ==
The tunnel is part of a larger project to upgrade the whole West Coast Line to double track. In the context of this project, the single-track stretch over the Hallandsås ridge was both too curvy and steep to allow for easy double-track conversion and still allow for high-speed passenger trains and heavy freight trains. Additionally, this stretch contained 13 level crossings, the single-track Båstad station, and a passing loop at Grevie at which trains must meet (and accumulate significant delays if one or both trains are late). In order to avoid this bottleneck, some passenger train services between Gothenburg and Malmö, as well as most freight trains, took a long detour along the Halmstad–Hässleholm railway (which is also too steep for efficient freight traffic) and on the congested Hässleholm–Malmö railway.

The Hallandsås Tunnel gives a time saving of 10 to 15 minutes for passenger trains. The capacity across the ridge will increase from 4 to 24 trains per hour (both directions together; in reality there will be 8-10 trains per hour in 2016). The tunnel project was conceived by the European Round Table of Industrialists and the newly formed Swedish Rail Administration (Banverket, now part of the Swedish Transport Administration or Trafikverket) in the 1980s.

== Construction ==
=== 1990s: Problems, scandal, and stoppage ===
Construction began in 1992, and the traffic opening was originally planned for 1995. However, construction was plagued by major difficulties concerning large amounts of water seeping in from surrounding rock, only a small fraction of which had been foreseen. Additionally, the original drill, which was said to drill 100 meters per week, broke down after drilling only 18 m (59 ft). The rock was too soft, so the machine could not use it to pull itself forward. The contractor tried to drill traditionally, but had to spend a lot of effort on sealing the water leaks. The contractor went bankrupt and a new contractor, Skanska, was contracted. The new contractor had similar trouble but a better contract that gave compensation for troublesome rock conditions.

A scandal broke out when it was learned that a poisonous sealing compound Rhoca-Gil was used during construction. This substance was linked to the death of nearby livestock. Rhoca-Gil contains acrylamide, a toxic chemical that is mutagenic and possibly carcinogenic. The main contractor, Skanska, took no special precautions for the sealant, nor did it tell its own workers or the local population of the risks. By October 1997, local cattle and fish started dying and workers were becoming ill. The local press started an investigation. After tests were done showing high levels of acrylamide contamination, the site was declared a high risk zone and the sale of agricultural products from the region was banned. Skanska, along with Rhone-Poulenc and Swedish Railways all had criminal charges brought against them; some senior executives resigned as a result.

Construction was halted in late 1997. By this time, nearly 3 km (1.9 mi) had been bored in each tunnel: 1,200 m (3,937 ft) at the north end, 1,700 m (5,577 ft) at the south end, and 40 m (131 ft) at the central adit).

=== 2000s: Construction resumes ===
In 2005 construction resumed after a positive decision by the Riksdag and the Swedish government, hydrological and environmental remediation by Banverket and Skanska, and selection of contracting consortium Skanska-Vinci for the project. A new completion date of 2012 was initially estimated, later being revised to 2015.

As the consortium decided to drill only one tunnel at a time, only one tunnel boring machine (TBM) was used for the revived project. Nicknamed "Åsa", the TBM was in reality a comprehensive tunnelling machine; as it drilled through the strata, it simultaneously installed precast concrete tunnel lining segments behind it, and then injected a mortar-and-gravel slurry into the voids between the strata and the lining. The problem of drilling through saturated rock and soil was tackled by drilling a pilot tunnel ahead of the TBM, then freezing the surrounding rock to a temperature of −40 °C (−40 °F), thereby guaranteeing solid strata for the TBM's progress.

=== 2010s: Breakthrough ===
On 25 August 2010, around 13:10 CET, breakthrough was achieved in the eastern tunnel. Drilling then switched to the western tunnel, which started in March 2011 from the workface at the south end and proceeded north. On 3 April 2012, this drive reached the central adit, whereupon 2,517 m (8,258 ft), or 46 percent, of the western tunnel had been bored. The remaining 1,144 m (3,753 ft) to be drilled, which totaled 15 percent of the entire drilling project, was expected to be particularly challenging, as it contains a section of poor quality bedrock and significant amounts of water and water pressure. An extra freezing stage, plus extra time (4 to 6 months) allotted for freezing, and thicker concrete lining segments, was utilized in this 300 m (984 ft) problem area, which is longer than the adjacent area encountered in the eastern bore. On 4 September 2013, the second tunnel broke through.

There are 19 emergency cross-passages (including the central adit) between the two tunnels every 500 m (1,640 ft). These were bored and lined separately, a process completed in February 2014.

The opening ceremony was held on 8 December 2015, and the tunnel opened for traffic on 13 December.

== Cost ==
Cost overrun has been large. The cost was expected in 1992 to be 1 billion Swedish krona (SEK). The cost from 1992 to 1997 was in reality more than SEK 2 billion, for less than half the tunnel length. Since the remaining cost at the beginning of 2005 was calculated to be more than SEK 4 billion, there was initially much debate and hesitation as to whether to halt or resume work. The total cost is likely to reach over SEK 10.5 billion (approximately 1.25 billion USD as calculated in 2015), before the project is finished.

== New stations ==
As Båstad station was located on the old main line, a new station to the north of the tunnel's northern portal, located at 56°25′55″N 12°54′24″E and called Båstad N (Båstad North), replaced the old station. The bare platforms for Båstad N were built in the 1990s when the tunnel was first started, and finished during 2015.

At the south end of the tunnel, two new stations for local trains (pågatåg) opened, Förslöv and Barkåkra station.

== Removal of the old railway ==
There were plans for a station for local trains at Grevie on the old railway, but the Båstad Municipality would have been required to finance maintenance of that railway in that case, so these plans were dropped.

On Nov 4, 2015 work was started to dismantle the old railway for re-use, recycling and disposal, and to rebuild the road surfaces at its crossings.
