= Ewonne Winblad =

Swedish journalist (1937–2022)

- Born: Ewonne Elisabet Callert; 1 April 1937; Stockholm, Sweden
- Died: 9 June 2022 (aged 85); Stockholm, Sweden
- Occupation: Journalist
- Spouse: Lennart Winblad (m. 1965; died 2022)

Ewonne Elisabet Winblad (née Callert; 1 April 1937 – 9 June 2022) was a Swedish journalist, author, television reporter, and director.

== Early life ==
Winblad was born as Ewonne Elisabet Callert on 1 April 1937 at Katarina Parish, Stockholm, Sweden, the daughter of David Callert and his wife Ruth (née Nästegård). She passed studentexamen in 1956 and attended Stockholm University between 1956 and 1959.

== Career ==
Winblad worked as a secretary at Saint Göran Hospital in Stockholm from 1959 to 1960, and at Karolinska Hospital from 1960 to 1962. She worked as a program assistant at Sveriges Radio from 1962 to 1968 and as general reporter at Aftonbladet from 1968 to 1976. Winblad was correspondent in London from 1968 to 1972, deputy local radio manager in Stockholm from 1977 to 1980, and an employee at Rapport in TV2 from 1980 to 1986. She was a newscaster in Sweden's first TV news broadcast about the assassination of Olof Palme on 1 March 1986 at 04:00. Winblad worked as program manager of Kanal 1 from 1986 to 1988, as editorial manager Rapport in 1988, and as channel manager of Sveriges Radio P1 in Sveriges Riksradio AB from 1992 to 1997.

She has also been a board member of Dagens Nyheter and a member of the government's commission on the events in the Hallandsås Tunnel (Tunnel Commission) from 1997 to 1998, the Security Services Commission from 1999 and the Protection Registration Delegation. Winblad was a board member of the Gullers Grupp from 1998.

Winblad continued to work as a freelance journalist and writer. In 2008, she was awarded the H. M. The King's Medal in the 8th size of the Order of Seraphim for meritorious contributions to Swedish society.

== Personal life and death ==
In 1965, Winblad married the journalist Lennart Winblad (1938–2022), the son of Wilhelm Winblad and Rut (née Sundin). They had two children. On 9 June 2022, it was announced that Winblad died.

== Bibliography ==
- Winblad, Ewonne (2011). Annonsdrottningen [The Queen of Ads(]. Svenska företagare (in Swedish). Stockholm: Atlantis. ISBN 9789173534512. SELIBR 12321063.
- Winblad, Ewonne (2007). Frälst, förmögen, förskingrad: historien om Hanna Lindmark och Margaretaskolan [Saved, wealthy, embezzled: the story of Hanna Lindmark and the Margaret School] (in Swedish). Stockholm: Bonnier. ISBN 9789100108328. SELIBR 10415116.
- Winblad, Ewonne (2002). Närbilder [Close-ups] (in Swedish). Stockholm: Ekerlid. ISBN 9189617223. SELIBR 8383042.
