= Skanska =

Multinational construction and development company based in Sweden

Skanska AB
- Type: Publicly traded Aktiebolag
- Traded as: Nasdaq Stockholm: SKA B
- ISIN: SE0000113250
- Industry: Construction
- Founded: 1887; 139 years ago
- Headquarters: Stockholm, Sweden
- Key people: Anders Danielsson (President and CEO); Hans Biörck (Chairman)
- Products: Residential development, commercial property development and infrastructure development
- Revenue: ▲SEK 176.7 billion (2025)
- Operating income: ▼SEK 6.6 billion (2025)
- Net income: ▲SEK 5.8 billion (2025)
- Total assets: ▼SEK 158.3 billion (2025)
- Total equity: ▼SEK 62.0 billion (2025)
- Number of employees: 25,860 (2025)
- Website: skanska.com
- Footnotes; Financial data according to IFRS

Skanska AB (Swedish pronunciation: [ˈskânːska]) is a multinational construction and development company based in Sweden. It was established in 1887 as a concrete product manufacturer.

== History ==
Aktiebolaget Skånska Cementgjuteriet (Scanian Cement Casting Ltd) was established in Malmö, Sweden, in 1887 by Rudolf Fredrik Berg and started by manufacturing concrete products. It quickly diversified into a construction company and within ten years the company received its first international order. The company played an important role in building Sweden's infrastructure including its roads, power plants, offices and housing.

Growth in Sweden was followed by international expansion. In the mid-1950s Skånska Cementgjuteriet made a major move into international markets. During the next decades, it entered South America, Africa and Asia, and in 1971 the United States market, where it today ranks among the largest in its sector. The company was listed on the Stockholm Stock Exchange A-list in 1965. In 1984, the name "Skanska," already in general use internationally, became the group's official name.

During the latter part of the 1990s, Skanska expanded substantially both organically and by acquisition. In August 2000, it bought the construction division of Kvaerner.

In mid-2004, Skanska decided to divest its Asian investments and sold its Indian subsidiary to the Thailand based construction firm Italian Thai Development Company.

In 2011, Skanska acquired Industrial Contractors, Inc of Evansville, Indiana, United States.

== Operations ==
Skanska divides its operations into four business streams:

| Business stream | Yearly revenue, 5-year average (2010 to 2014) |
|---|---|
| Construction | SEK 116,152 million |
| Residential development | SEK 8,721 million |
| Commercial property development | SEK 6,691 million |
| Infrastructure development | SEK 219 million |

Construction is the largest business stream by revenue and number of employees. The operations of the other business streams involve investments in projects that are developed and later divested. With regard to infrastructure development, this often involves public–private partnerships (PPP). Geographically, the group operates based on local business units.

=== Skanska USA ===
Skanska established its presence in the United States through acquisitions of established local companies. The legacy company names were initially cobranded (ex. Slattery-Skanska). In 2007, Skanska introduced a plan to integrate and rebrand the majority of the acquired entities under the Skanska USA banners. Entities were united by business sector, geographic region, and district. Three regions were formed: Northeast, Southeast, and Western.

| Region | Legacy company |
|---|---|
| Skanska Civil USA Northeast | Slattery Skanska |
| Skanska Civil USA Northeast | Gottlieb Group |
| Skanska Civil USA Northeast | Underpinning & Foundation Skanska |
| Skanska Civil USA Northeast | Koch-Skanska Erectors |
| Skanska USA Civil Southeast | Atlantic Skanska |
| Skanska USA Civil Southeast | Tidewater Skanska |
| Skanska USA Civil Southeast | Bayshore Concrete Products |
| Skanska USA Civil Western Region | Yeager Skanska |

| Company name | Business sector | Year acquired | Region | Status |
|---|---|---|---|---|
| Underpinning & Foundation | Foundations/Ground Improvement | 1973 | New York | Underpinning & Foundation Skanska, division of Skanska USA Civil Northeast Inc |
| Karl Koch Erecting | Steel Erection | 1982 | Northeast | Skanska-Koch. |
| Slattery Contracting Company | Heavy Civil | 1989 | Northeast | Rebranded to Skanska USA Civil Northeast Inc (2007) |
| Sordini Construction Co. | Building Construction | 1990 | Northeast | |
| Beers Construction | Building Construction | 1994 | Southeast | Rebranded to Skanska USA Building Inc |
| Nielsons Inc | Building Construction | 1998 | Midwest, Colorado | Rebranded to Skanska USA Building Inc |
| Beacon Construction Company | Building Construction | 1997 | Northeast | Rebranded to Skanska USA Building Inc |
| Bayshore Concrete Products Inc | Materials Fabricator | 1998 | Southeast | Division of Skanska USA Civil Southeast |
| A.J. Etkin Construction Company | Building Construction | 1998 | Michigan | Rebranded to Skanska USA Building Inc (2003) |
| Tidewater Construction Corporation | Heavy Civil | 1998 | Southeast | Rebranded to Skanska USA Civil Southeast Inc |
| Gottlieb Group | Heavy Civil | 1999 | Northeast | Rebranded to Skanska USA Civil Northeast Inc (2007) |
| Barclay White | Construction Management | 2000 | Northeast, Mid-Atlantic | Rebranded to Skanska USA Building Inc |
| Baugh Construction | Building Construction | 2000 | Pacific Northwest | Skanska USA West Region |
| E. L. Yeager Construction Co. | Heavy Civil | 2002 | California | Rebranded to Skanska USA Civil Western Inc - California District |
| BFW Construction | Building Construction | 2004 | Midwest, Texas | Rebranded to Skanska USA Building Inc (2004) |

=== Environment ===
Skanska was the No. 1 "Green Builder" in the United States in 2007 and was ranked No. 3 "Green Contractor" in the United States 2008. In 2011, Skanska was ranked the greenest company in the United Kingdom, despite belonging to an industry with a generally high environmental impact. In 2014, Skanska won the Financial Times and ArcelorMittal "Boldness in Business Award" in the category "corporate responsibility/environment".

The Financial Times described Skanska in 2014 as aiming to be the "greenest contractor in the world," while having 57,000 employees, 100,000 suppliers and 250,000 subcontractors, who deliver more than 10,000 projects annually. An official vision stated by Skanska is "the five zeros": zero loss-making projects, work site accidents, environmental incidents, ethical breaches and defects.

In the United Kingdom, Skanska has founded the "Supply Chain Sustainability School," an e-learning initiative, in order to educate construction suppliers on sustainability. As suppliers are frequently shared between construction companies, the school is managed in partnership with several competitors. In July 2013, Skanska withdrew from the United States Chamber of Commerce, in protest of the chamber's opposition to reformed LEED standards for sustainable buildings.

Skanska was the first company in the industry to implement the ISO 14000 standards globally, with all its business units having been certified according to ISO 14001 since 2000, and it was the first Scandinavian company to have an independent global whistleblowing hotline.

=== Market ===
As of March 2015, Skanska was focused on the following selected markets:

- Sweden, Norway, Finland, and Denmark in the Nordic region
- Poland, the Czech Republic, Slovakia, Hungary, Romania, and the United Kingdom in the rest of Europe
- The United States and North America

Skanska is in the process of exiting its operations in Argentina, Brazil, Peru, Chile, Colombia, and Venezuela. Skanska will cease to accept new projects in the Latin American market and will divest its operation and maintenance units there.

| Region | Number of employees | Revenue (2014) |
|---|---|---|
| The Nordic countries | 17,000 | SEK 64.0 billion |
| The rest of Europe | 17,000 | SEK 35.0 billion |
| North America | 10,000 | SEK 49.9 billion |
| Latin America (being closed down) | 14,000 | No data available |

Skanska is active in construction, commercial property development (office buildings, shopping centers and logistics properties) and infrastructure development (roads, hospitals and schools) in all of its three market regions. The company plans, develops and builds homes in the Nordic region and in the rest of Europe.

In 2013, Skanska was ranked the 9th largest contractor in the world, and in 2014, the 7th largest contractor in the United States.

During the rolling 12-month-period ending in September 2014, Skanska was the largest construction company by total revenue in the Nordic countries. The six largest ones were:

| Company | Country | 12-month revenue |
|---|---|---|
| Skanska | Sweden | SEK 145.0 billion |
| NCC | Sweden | SEK 59.2 billion |
| Peab | Sweden | SEK 44.2 billion |
| Veidekke | Norway | SEK 25.4 billion |
| Lemminkäinen | Finland | SEK 18.7 billion |
| YIT | Finland | SEK 16.7 billion |

== Major projects ==
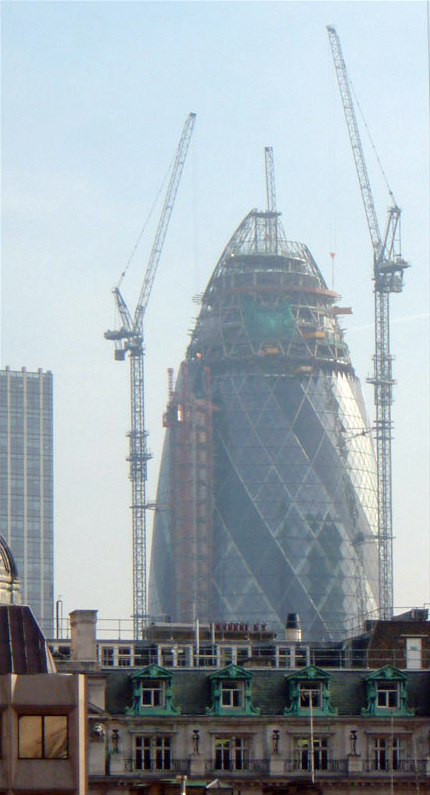
Work in progress on 30 St Mary Axe, one of Skanska's most high-profile contracts. Built between 2001 and 2004, the tower was a major addition to London's skyline.

=== Europe ===
Major projects have included the Øresund Bridge which forms part of the road and railway connection between Sweden and Denmark, completed in 2000, the Queen Elizabeth Hospital, London, completed in 2001, the Golden Jubilee wing at King's College Hospital, completed in 2002, 30 St Mary Axe in London, completed in 2004, MoD Main Building completing refurbishment in 2004, the University Hospital Coventry, completed in 2006, the Mater Dei Hospital in Malta, completed in 2007, the Royal Derby Hospital, completed in 2010, Walsall Manor Hospital completed in 2010, the Heron Tower, completed in 2011, King's Mill Hospital in Ashfield, completed in 2011, Brent Civic Centre, completed in 2013, new facilities for the Royal London Hospital, completed in 2015 and the redevelopment of St Bartholomew's Hospital, completed in 2016.

Skanska is also involved in HS2 lots S1 and S2, working as part of a joint venture, due to complete in 2031.

=== United States ===
Major projects in the United States include the MetLife Stadium (home to the Giants and the Jets NFL franchises), completed in 2010. In 2010, Skanska was awarded a $115 million (SEK840 million) contract by the Washington State Department of Transportation for construction of a new State Route 99 roadway in downtown Seattle, Washington, part of the project to replace the Alaskan Way Viaduct. Skanska has also developed several commercial and residential buildings in Seattle region, including the upcoming 2&U high-rise office building in downtown Seattle.

Other major projects include the renovation of, and addition to, the headquarters of the United Nations, completed in 2014, the restoration of the World Trade Center site including the removal of debris, the reconstruction of the Port Authority Trans-Hudson and New York City Subway tunnels, and the creation of a World Trade Center Transportation Hub, completed in 2015 (including the "Oculus" station entrance designed by Santiago Calatrava), the Second Avenue Subway tunneling project completed in 2016 and Moynihan Train Hall completed in 2020.

Skanska was also part of a joint venture with Stacy Witbeck on the Sixth Street Viaduct replacement project completed in 2022.

In June 2025, Skanska was awarded a $303 million contract from the Massachusetts Department of Transportation to design and build a restructured Rourke Bridge over the Merrimack River.

== Awards and recognition ==
Skanska USA CEO and president, Richard Kennedy, was named in the Construction Dive Awards Executive of the Year in 2019. Skanska was also recognized for its membership in the Predictive Analytics Strategic Council, which Construction Dive named its 2019 Innovator of the Year.

== Controversies ==
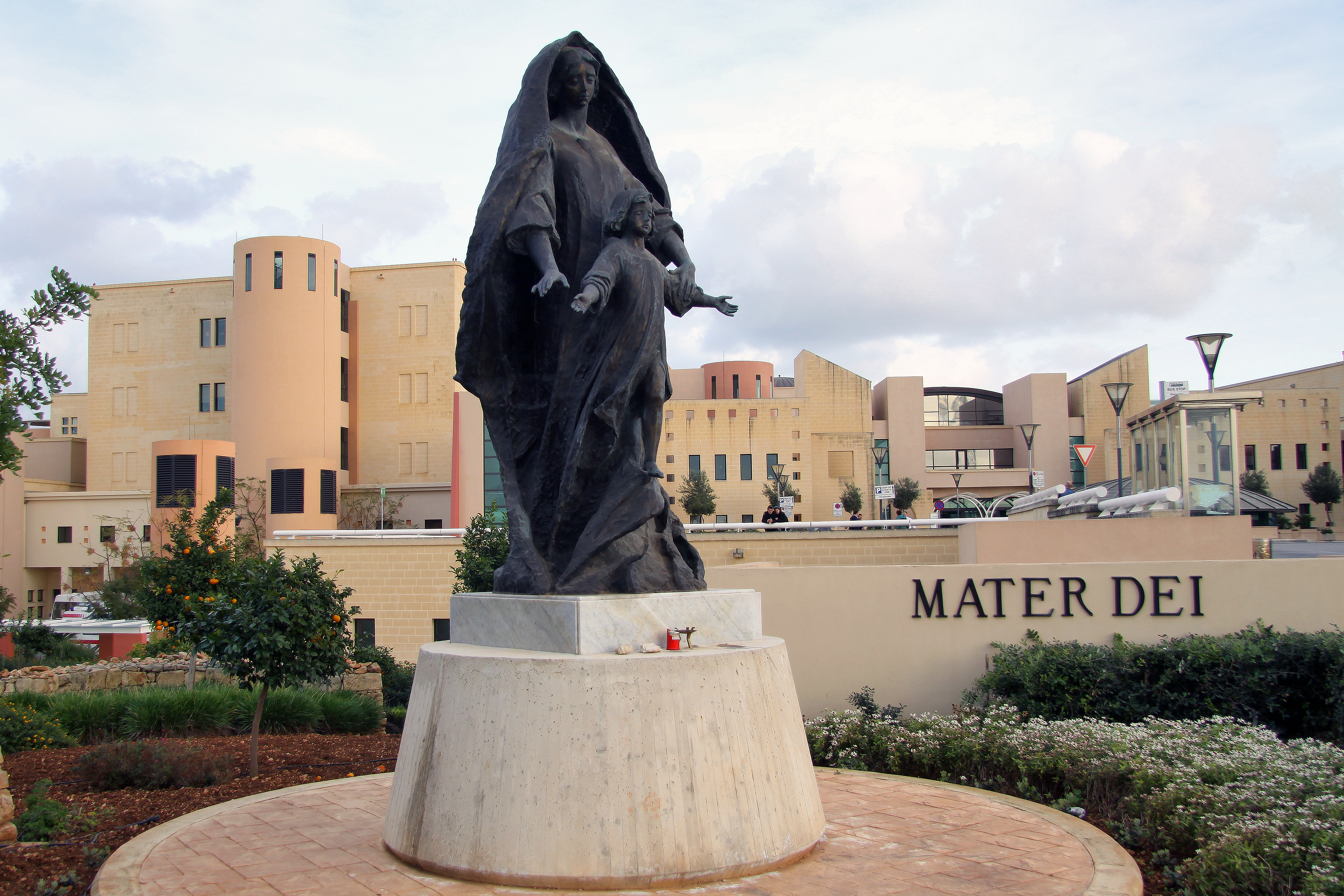
Mater Dei Hospital

In 1996, Skanska was entrusted with the building of a "state-of-the-art" general hospital, Mater Dei Hospital, costing over €700,000,000 in Malta. Later, however, it was discovered that Skanska had used lower-quality cement of the kind that is generally used to build pavements. As a result, the hospital could not develop further floors or build a helipad on the roof. The company had limited liability within the contract.

A scandal broke out in 1997 when it was learned that a poisonous sealing compound Rhoca-Gil was used during construction of a railway tunnel, Hallandsås Tunnel, in southern Sweden. This substance was linked to the death of nearby livestock. Rhoca-Gil contains acrylamide, a toxic chemical that is mutagenic and possibly carcinogenic. Skanska took no special precautions for the sealant, nor did it tell its own workers or the local population of the risks. By October 1997, local cattle and fish started dying and workers were becoming ill. After tests were done showing high levels of acrylamide contamination, the site was declared a high risk zone and the sale of agricultural products from the region was banned. Skanska, along with Rhone-Poulenc and Swedish Railways all had criminal charges brought against them; some senior executives resigned as a result. Construction was halted in late 1997, but resumed in 2005 after hydrological and environmental remediation by Banverket and Skanska.

In 2005, Skanska was awarded a large natural gas pipeline contract in Argentina. In 2007, the company was implicated in reports of bribery involving illegal payments to government officials relating to the project award. Six former Skanska managers plus a former consultant were arrested for tax evasion. Skanska performed its own investigation, dismissing seven staff, and worked closely with the authorities concerning the inquiry. Later bribery allegations related to a pipeline for Petrobras in Brazil, prompting Skanska to be barred from bidding for work for two years by the Brazilian government, and to withdraw completely from operations in South America.

Skanska-owned UK business Kværner/Trafalgar House Plc was involved with the UK's Consulting Association, exposed in 2009 for operating an illegal construction industry blacklist; Skanska was reported to be the industry's most prolific user of the Consulting Association's services, spending over £28,000 on top of a £3,000 annual subscription. Later, Skanska was among eight businesses who launched the Construction Workers Compensation Scheme in 2014, condemned as a "PR stunt" by the GMB union, and described by the Scottish Affairs Select Committee as "an act of bad faith". In December 2017, union Unite announced it had issued high court proceedings against four former chairmen of the Consulting Association, included Skanska's former director of industrial relations, Stephen Quant, alleging breach of privacy, defamation and Data Protection Act offences. Unite also said it was taking action against 12 major contractors including Skanska.

In December 2013, the Supreme Court of the Slovak Republic confirmed that Skanska DS a.s. participated in a bid rigging cartel of construction companies (together with companies of Strabag group and Mota-Engil group) in 2004. Illegal conduct was associated with the tender for the execution of works for the construction of the D1 highway from Mengusovce to Jánovce in eastern Slovakia.

On September 16, 2020, Skanska failed to secure 20 barges at and around their Pensacola Bay Bridge site in Florida ahead of the impending Hurricane Sally. Numerous barges made contact with the newly constructed bridge destroying large segments of it, leaving the bridge impassable and unsafe to drive on. This bridge is a crucial economic artery for the Pensacola-Gulf Breeze area; over 55,000 vehicles use the bridge daily. The inability for many individuals to commute to their jobs, homes, and businesses have had a detrimental impact on the area. Among the rogue barges, many washed ashore in residents yards and on roadways. As of September 22, Skanska has failed to address the disaster with the public.

== See also ==
- Road to the Greenland Ice Sheet
