= Peab =

Swedish construction company

Peab AB
- Type: Aktiebolag
- Traded as: Nasdaq Stockholm: PEAB B
- Industry: Construction
- Founded: Sweden (1959)
- Founder: Erik and Mats Paulsson
- Headquarters: Förslöv, Sweden
- Key people: Jesper Göransson (President and CEO); Göran Grosskopf (Chairman); Mats Paulsson (Vice Chairman, major shareholder)
- Revenue: SEK 50.395 billion
- Operating income: SEK 2.445 billion
- Net income: SEK 2.057 billion
- Total assets: SEK 32.276 billion
- Number of employees: 14 578
- Subsidiaries: Peab A/S; Peab OY; Peab sp. z o.o.
- Website: peab.se
- Footnotes; Annual Report 2013; Solid Info AB

Peab AB (originally Paulsson Entreprenad AktieBolag) is a construction and civil engineering company headquartered in Förslöv, Scania, listed on NASDAQ OMX Stockholm. It is the third largest construction company in Sweden and the Nordic region, with annual revenues exceeding SEK 50 billion. Peab has approximately 130 regional offices and 14,578 employees in Sweden, Norway and Finland.

== History ==
The foundation of Peab was laid in 1959 by the brothers Erik and Mats Paulsson, then aged 16 and 14 respectively, to help farmers with refuse collection and disposal. However, the current name wasn't used until 1967, when the brothers created the limited company Bröderna Paulsson Peab AB, shifting focus towards construction at the same time. The company expanded in southern Sweden by acquisitions throughout the '70s and '80s.

Peab finally reached national coverage in 1991, after a merger with the OTC-traded company Hallströms and Nisses AB; a company whose market was Stockholm and northern Sweden, supplementing Peab's market coverage. The first international expansion occurred in 1994, when Peab acquired Fagbygg A/S in Norway, which later merged with NOR Gruppen A/S, making it the fourth largest construction company in Norway. In 1999 the company entered the Finnish market, after acquiring Rakennus OY Leo Heinänen, which was complemented with Seicon and Vasa Betong in 2003.

In 2011, Mats Paulsson stepped down as CEO, moving into the position of Vice Chairman of the Board. Erik Paulsson with family sold their shares in Peab to Mats Paulsson and his family in 2014.

== Business areas ==
Peab is organized into four business areas, serving both external customers and internally, to other units in the company:

- Construction — Performs contract work for new construction, renovation and maintenance
- Civil Engineering — Offers civil engineering on infrastructure projects, as well as maintenance of roads
- Industry — Delivers material and equipment
- Project Development — Offers housing and commercial property development services

Construction is the largest business area, accounting for almost half of the operative net sales and share of employees in 2013. Approximately 80% of the sales were located in Sweden.

== Bribery scandals ==
PEAB has been involved in a number of bribery scandals during the construction of Strawberry Arena. A high level manager was bribed with a sailing boat by a subcontractor. In addition, founder Erik Paulsson was charged with bribery of city director Sune Reinhold of Solna city.

== Major projects ==
- 3Arena, Stockholm
- Strawberry Arena and the accompanying residential district Arenastaden, Solna
- Scandic Victoria Tower, Kista

== See also ==
- Skanska
- NCC AB
- Gotland
