= Norrviken Gardens =

Park in Båstad Municipality, Sweden

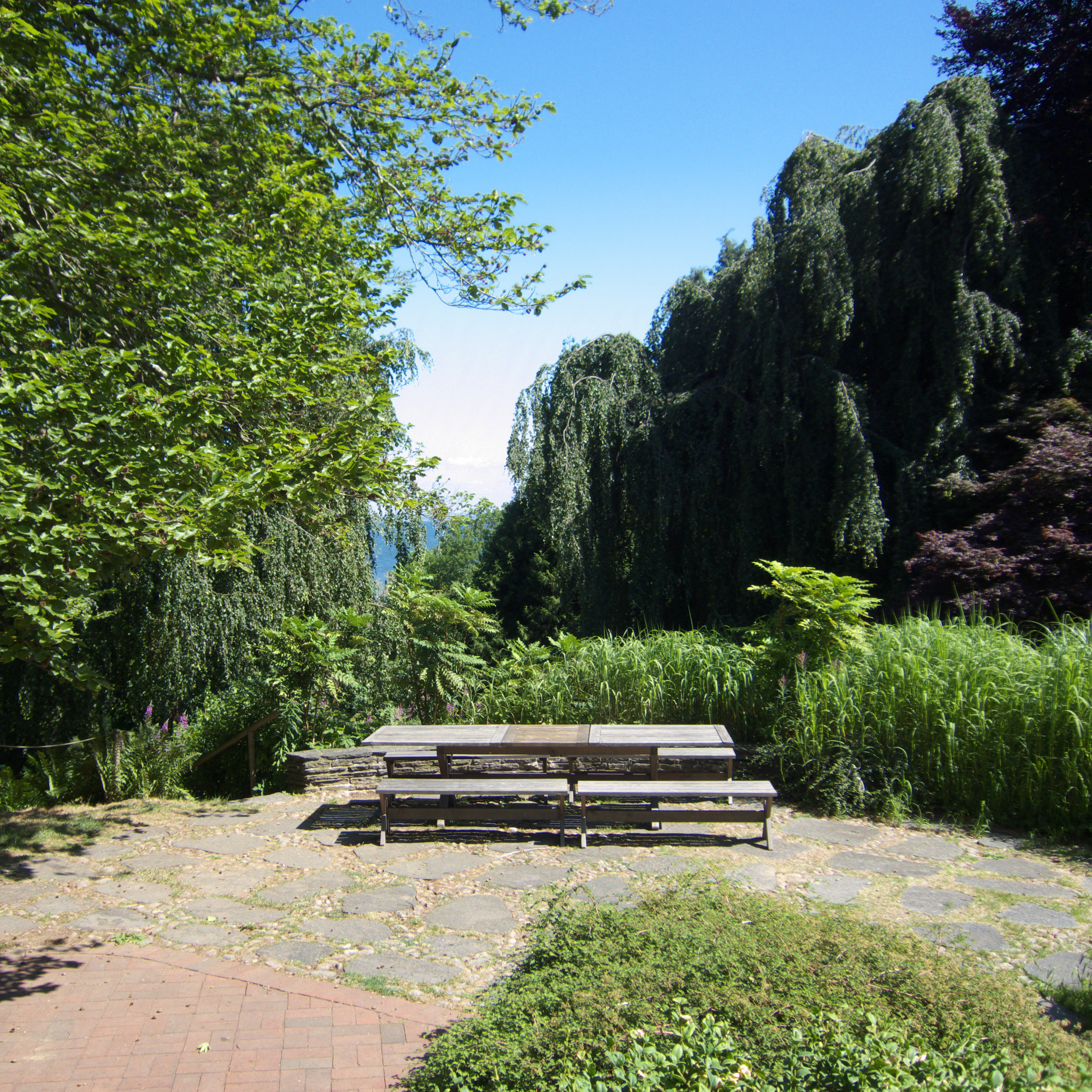
- Norrviken Gardens in July 2010
- Interactive map of Norrviken Gardens
- Location: Båstad Municipality, Sweden
- Coordinates: 56°27′0″N 12°47′30″E
- Founder: Rudolf Abelin
- Status: Open 1 May–29 August
- Website: norrvikenstradgardar.se

Norrviken Gardens (Swedish: Norrvikens trädgårdar) is a garden, located about 3 kilometers northwest of Båstad in Skåne County, Sweden. It was founded by horticulturist and pomologist Carl Rudolf Zacharias Abelin (1864-1961). Norrviken's gardens were started as an experimental garden and as a home for his family.

From 1986, Norrviken Gardens was run as a limited company with the Norrviken Gardens Foundation as a guarantee that the plant was maintained and developed in the spirit of Abelin. The garden was chosen as the most beautiful park in Sweden and the second most beautiful in Europe in 2006.

Due to financial issues the park has begun to fall into decline. Different interest groups are doing efforts to come up with new ways to fund the park, but disagreements between the groups have hampered the development of the park. In 2013, the Board of Directors of the Foundation decided that a bankruptcy application should be filed. In 2013, the gardens with its main building Villa Abelin were sold to the company, Lilla Båstad. Today Villa Abelin houses shops, a restaurant and a gallery.

== Gallery ==
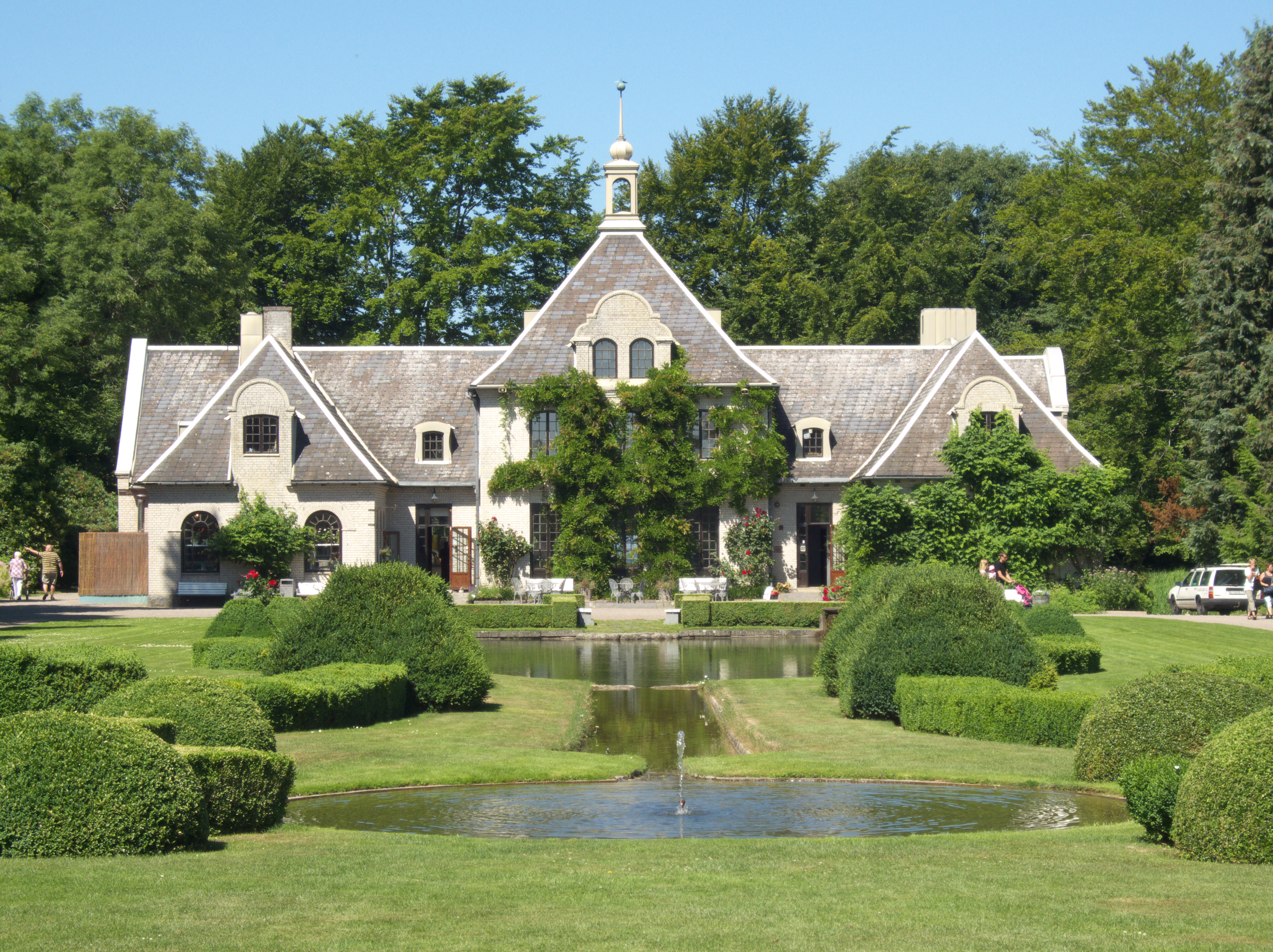
Villa Abelin

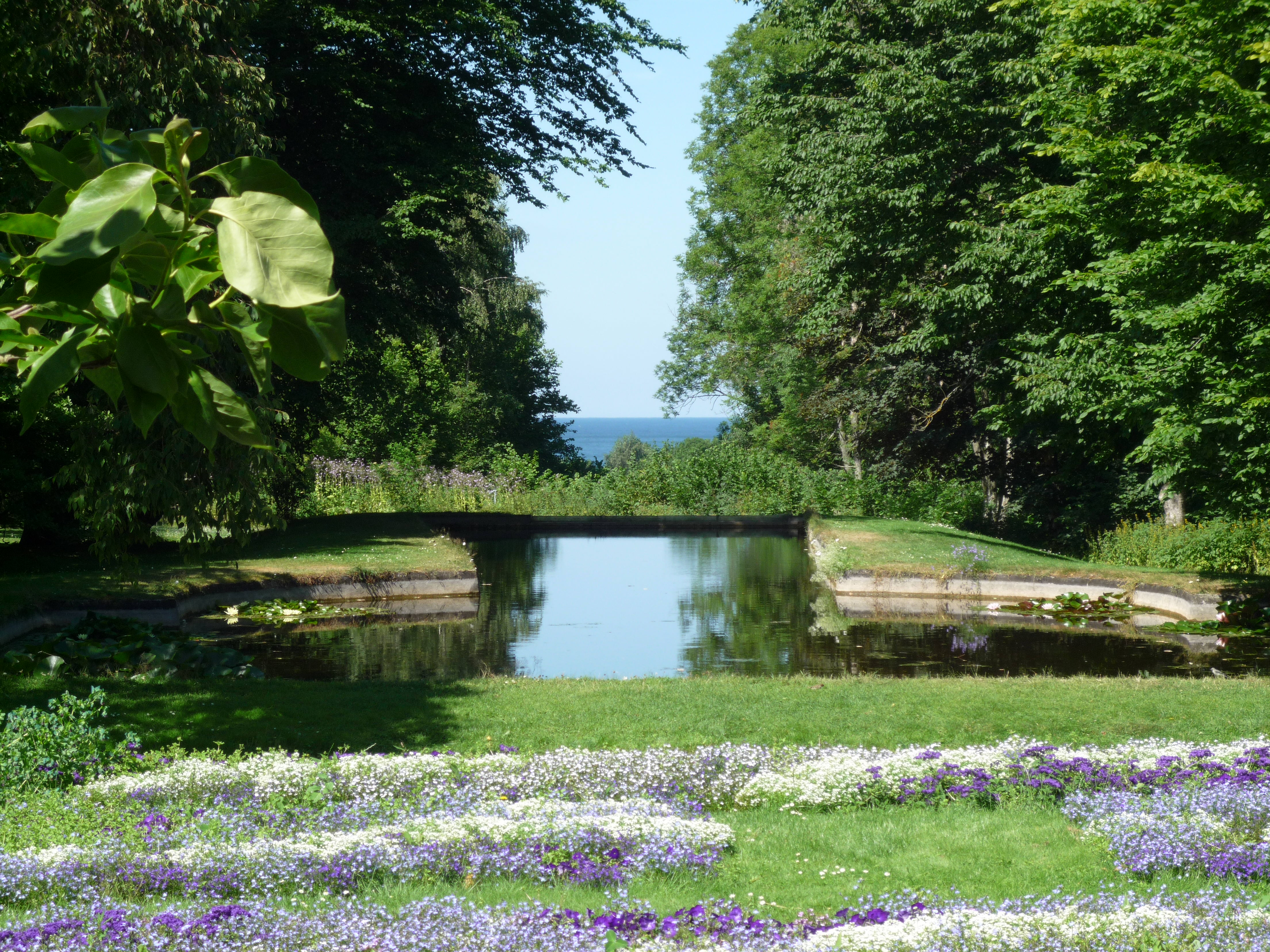
Pond

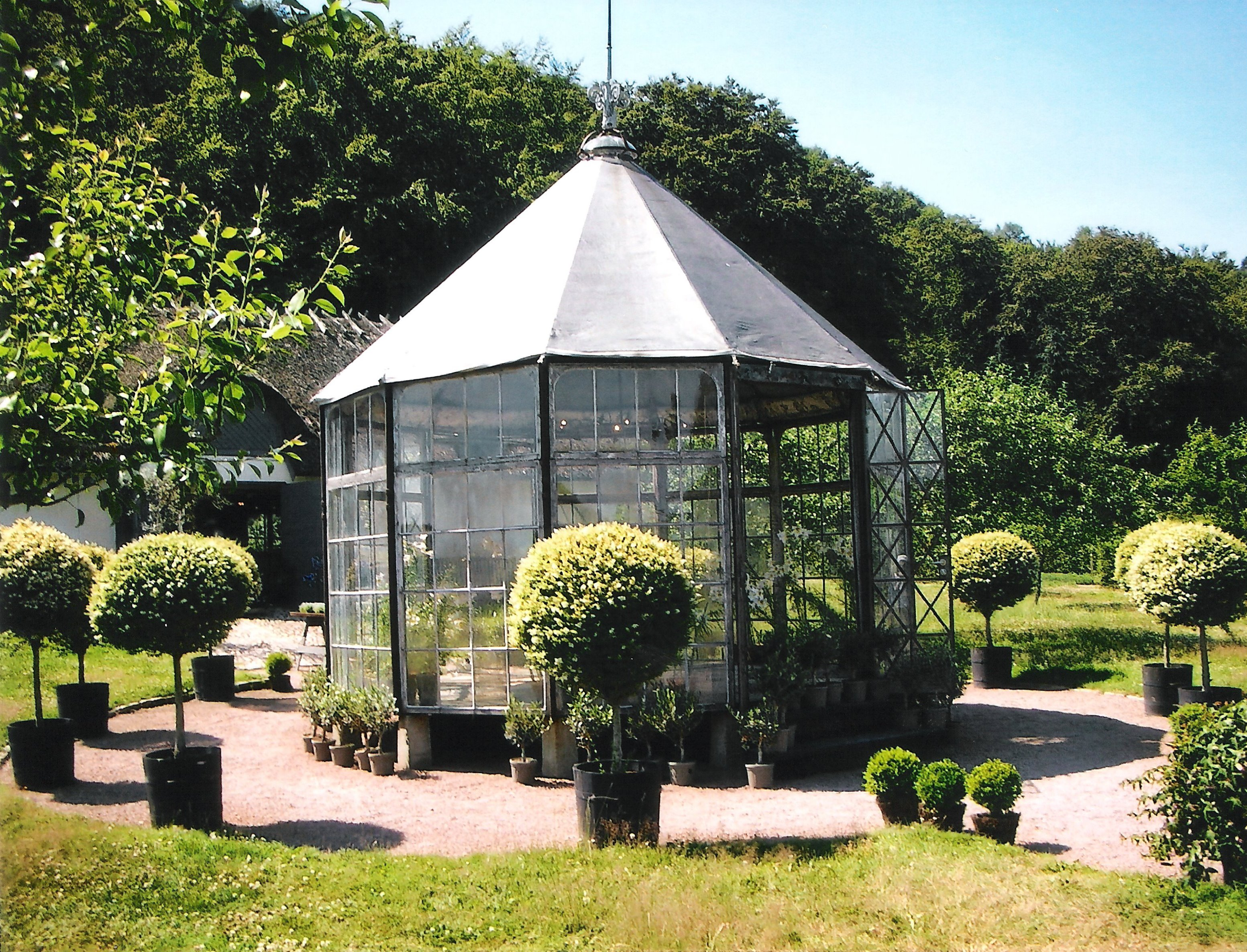
Bee House
