= Erik Paulsson =

Swedish businessman (1942–2025)

- Born: 31 January 1942
- Died: 29 October 2025 (aged 83)
- Occupation: Businessman
- Children: 4

Erik Paulsson (31 January 1942 – 29 October 2025) was a Swedish billionaire businessman who was the chairman of Skistar from 1977.

In 1957, aged 17, Paulsson and his younger brother Mats founded PEAB, initially waste management, before expanding into construction in 1970.

PEAB had 2014 revenue of over $5 billion, and employed more than 14,000 people.

Paulsson was married with four children, and lived in Båstad, Sweden. He died on 29 October 2025, at the age of 83.
