= Troentorp Clogs =

Wooden clogs made in Troentorp, Sweden

Troentorp Toffelfabrick
- Founded: 1907
- Founder: August Johannson
- Headquarters: Troentorp, Sweden
- Products: Shoes
- Website: troentorpclogs.com

Troentorp Clogs are wooden clogs handcrafted in Troentorp, Sweden, a small village approximately three kilometers from Båstad, Skåne in southern Sweden. Troentorp Clogs (formerly known as Båstad Clogs) have gained international recognition, especially during the 1970s when Swedish clogs became a widely popular footwear. The clogs have been made by Troentorp Toffelfabrick (Troentorp Clog Factory) in the same location since 1907 and continue to be produced with the original wood and leather design.

== History ==
August Johannson founded Troentorp Toffelfabrick in 1907. Johannson, a former apprentice cobbler from the Båstad area, began production at his factory by using a wind powered lathe to carve the wooden clogs. In 1949, Johannson's sons, Stig and Bjore, took over ownership. On July 24, 1979, the "Troentorp" clog became a registered trademark of Troentorp Toffelfabrick.

Troentorp Toffelnfabrik has remained in business for over 100 years. The hand-crafted, nailed, and wet-lasted clogs are unique to Troentorp. The footwear has been crafted continually in the same location, and factory visits are popular with tourists visiting the area. The clogs were known for many years as Båstad Clogs due to their regional origin. However, owners went back to the original brand name, Troentorp, in 1999. Although ownership has changed from the Johansson family, many of the craftsmen are still employed at the factory.
