= Yvonne Maria Werner =

Swedish historian and professor

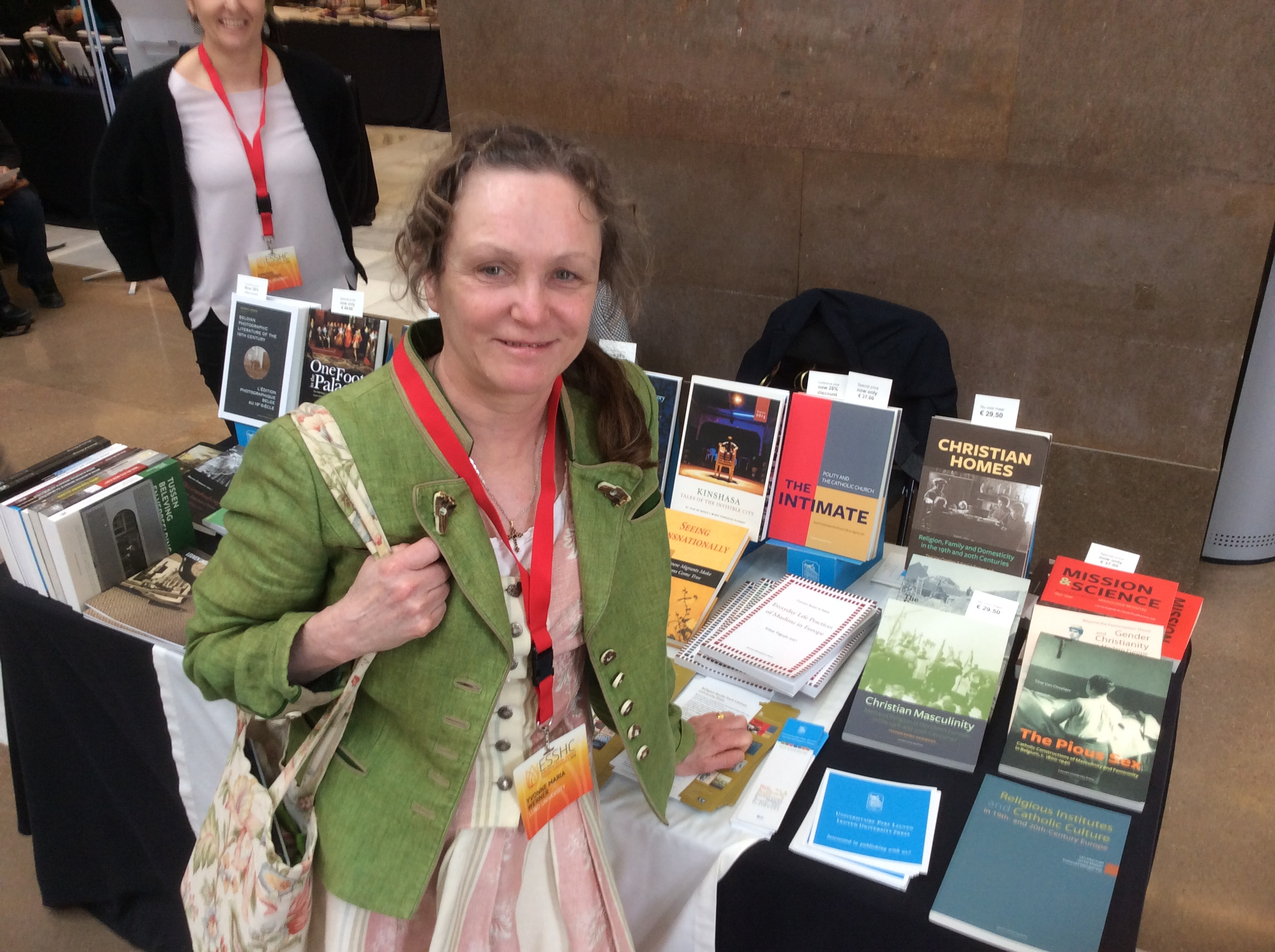
- Werner in 2016
- Born: Yvonne Karin Margaretha Brorsson; February 28, 1954 (age 72); Båstad, Skåne
- Known for: Historian, professor

Yvonne Maria Karin Margareta Werner (née Brorsson; born February 28, 1954) is a Swedish historian and professor. She currently works at Lund University.

== Biography ==
Brorsson was born in the town of Båstad in Kristianstad County. In 1989 she doctored at Lund University in Swedish-German relations around year 1900. She became a research assistant there in 1992, docent in 1999 and professor in 2008 at Lund University. Werner converted to Catholicism in 1987, and has especially researched the history of Catholicism in the Nordic countries during the 19th and 20th centuries. She has written numerous works in this area. In her research, she has investigated how moral values change over time and how they look in different societies, as well as how the moral values are conveyed to citizens and how the society reacts to ideological deviants.

Werner has participated in and facilitated several research projects, including the Nordic project The Women's Monastery Movement in the Nordic Region. A feminine counterculture in modern society, which ended in 2004, and Christian masculinity - a paradox of modernity: Men and religion in a Northern European context 1840-1940, which lasted until 2010. During the period 2005–2013, Werner was chairwoman of the Historical Society (Svenska Historiska Föreningen) at Lund. She has participated in the Swedish Research Council's Preparatory Group for Historical Sciences, Postdoctoral and Reorganization Panel in several rounds, and has also participated as a reviewer for other scientific councils and foundations in Sweden and in the Nordic region.

In addition to her work, Werner was employed as a tour leader for Catholic places in Italy, such as Assisi and Rome.

== Awards and honours ==
- 1997 – The New Society of Letters at Lund member (Ledamot av Vetenskapssocieteten i Lund, LVSL)
- 2002 - Royal Swedish History and Antiquity Academy: Uno Lindgren 's award for "outstanding and attentive insight into Catholic missionary history in Sweden".

== Bibliography (not complete) ==
- 1996 - Världsvid men främmande. Den katolska kyrkan i Sverige 1873–1929, Katolska bokförlaget
- 1998 - Den frivilliga döden. Samhällets hantering av självmord i historiskt perspektiv, red. Birgitta Odén, Bodil E. B. Persson, Yvonne Maria Werner, Cura förlag
- 2002 - Katolsk mission och kvinnlig motkultur: Sankt Josefsystrarna i Danmark och Sverige 1856–1936, Veritas förlag
- 2004 - Nuns and Sisters in the Nordic Countries after the Reformation. A Female Counter-Culture in Modern Society, ed. Yvonne Maria Werner, Studia Missionalia Svecana LXXXIX
- 2004 - Döden som katharsis. Nordiska perspektiv på dödens kultur och mentalitetshistoria, red. Yvonne Maria Werner, Almqvist & Wiksell
- 2005 - Kvinnligt klosterliv i Sverige och Norden: En motkultur i det moderna samhället, red. Yvonne Maria Werner, Catholica
- 2005 - Nordisk katolicism Katolsk mission och konversion i Danmark i ett nordiskt perspektiv, Makadam förlag
- 2008 - Kristen manlighet. Ideal och verklighet 1830–1940, red. Yvonne Maria Werner, Nordic Academic Press
- 2011 - Christian masculinity. Men and religion in northern Europe in the 19th and 20th century, ed. Yvonne Maria Werner, Leuven University Press
- 2013 - European Anti-Catholicism in a Comparative and Transnational Perspective, eds. Yvonne Maria Werner and Jonas Harvard, Brill
- 2014 - Katolsk manlighet. Det antimoderna alternativet. Katolska missionärer och lekmän i Skandinavien, Makadam förlag
- 2015 - "Den katolska faran': Antikatolicismen och den svenska nationella identiteten i ett nordiskt perspektiv": Scandia 81:1
- 2016 - "Katholische Männlichkeit in Skandinavien": Hg. Michaela Sohn-Kronthaler, Feminisierung oder (Re-)Maskulinisierung der Religion im 19. und 20. Jahrhundert?, Böhlau Verlag
- 2016 - "Liturgie und Männlichkeit in der katholischen Mission in Skandinavien": Hg. F. Franziska Metzger & E. Pahud de Mortanges, Orte und Räume des Religiösen im 19.–21. Jahrhundert, Ferdinand Schöningh Verlag
- 2017 - "Historiska perspektiv på den katolska kyrkan och demokratin." Signum: Katolsk orientering om kyrka, kultur, samhälle nr 4
