= Rhoca-Gil =

Sealant

Rhoca-Gil is a type of industrial sealant produced by Rhône-Poulenc, used in the construction of tunnels to block the passage of groundwater inside. The sealant begins as a liquid, then is injected into cavities which need to be sealed, and polymerises, causing it to harden.

== Process ==
Rhoca-Gil consists of two fluids, that are mixed, thinned out with water and then sprayed into cracks in the bedrock. One of the fluids contains acrylamide (a toxic substance) and methylolacrylamide. The mixed solution becomes a viscous fluid that penetrates cracks and holes in the rock, where the fluid reacts—polymerizes—to a tight plastic substance. When it is completely polymerized it is stable.

== Controversies ==
In 1992 construction of the Hallandsås tunnel in Sweden began, with opening plans for 1995. Groundwater leaking into the tunnel was however a major problem, slowing the progress, and Rhoca-Gil was used. In 1997, fish and local cattle started dying as a result of Rhoca-Gil in its liquid form leaking into the water supply, contaminating it with acrylamide, a known carcinogen, mutagen and neurotoxin. Furthermore, the contamination of the area led to a ban on agricultural products from the area, as well as a ban on using water from the area affecting local residents.

The main contractor, Skanska, along with Rhône-Poulenc and the Swedish Rail Administration had criminal charges brought against them. Some senior executives resigned. Construction was halted in late 1997. The main critique of the use of Rhoca-Gil was against Rhône-Poulenc for not pointing out the risks of using the sealant, as well as against Skanska for not informing local residents about the usage of Rhoca-Gil.

A similar incident occurred at the construction of Gardermobanen in Norway, leading to a ban of the substance in Norway in 1997.
