= A. Nattermann =

German pharmaceutical company

Coordinates: 50.9766753°N 6.8585631°E

A. Nattermann & Cie. GmbH
- Company type: Subsidiary
- Industry: Pharmaceutical
- Founded: c. 1906; 120 years ago
- Headquarters: Germany
- Parent: Sanofi
- Website: sanofi.com

A. Nattermann & Cie. GmbH is a German pharmaceutical company headquartered in Cologne-Bocklemünd (North Rhine-Westphalia), Nattermannallee 1.

== Foundation ==
The first mention of the company A. Nattermann & Cie. can be found in the Cologne People's Newspaper of January 21, 1906, under the section "Trade Register Entries". The company was established as a general partnership with two personally liable partners, August Nattermann and Rudolf Lappe.

August Nattermann (born March 29, 1861, in Cologne, died December 9, 1923, in Cologne) studied pharmacology in Cologne. Along with his wife Augusta Baur, he set up the "Augusta Drugstore" in Stephanstraße 13 (near St. Maria im Kapitol), which was next door to his father-in-law's house. Nattermann was familiar with the official drug catalog and had practical experience in pharmacy-appropriate drug preparation. At the age of 45, he utilized this knowledge to found a pharmaceutical company. His business partner was Rudolf Lappe (born April 17, 1878, in Wuppertal-Barmen, died February 27, 1954, in Cologne), a businessman who had just completed his commercial training at the Cologne drugstore Coenen & Dr. Schieffer.

Together, they began developing ready-made preparations with standardized medicinal content – a novelty that was successful in the market from the very start. In March 1909, Rudolf Lappe appeared as the sole owner in the trade register and continued the Nattermann company. August Nattermann remained a partner in the company and, in the meantime, collaborated with pharmacist and chemist Heinrich Schieffer. Starting in 1912, under the label "Dr. Schieffer", they distributed natural remedies such as metabolic salt, blood purification tea, and iron tincture. August Nattermann continued his research until 1923 and died at the age of 62 in Cologne.

== Pharmaceutical Company ==
August Nattermann's heirs and his partner Rudolf Lappe continued to run the company. In 1926, Nattermann built its first dedicated factory at Eupener Strasse 159a-161 for the research, development, and production of herbal medicines.

Initially, the company manufactured "non-ethical" products, meaning over-the-counter preparations. Later, they moved on to "ethical", prescription-required products; the company specialized in herbal medicine from an early stage. An early product from this factory was the blood cleansing tea "Nattermann".

The company established its own research department, which produced branded items:

- Biovital, a combination medicine with the longest tradition (patented in 1917);
- Ramend, a fat-dissolving metabolic tea (1934);
- Bronchicum, a cough medicine;
- Colagogum, a stomach and intestine medication;
- Lipostabil, a lipid-lowering drug.

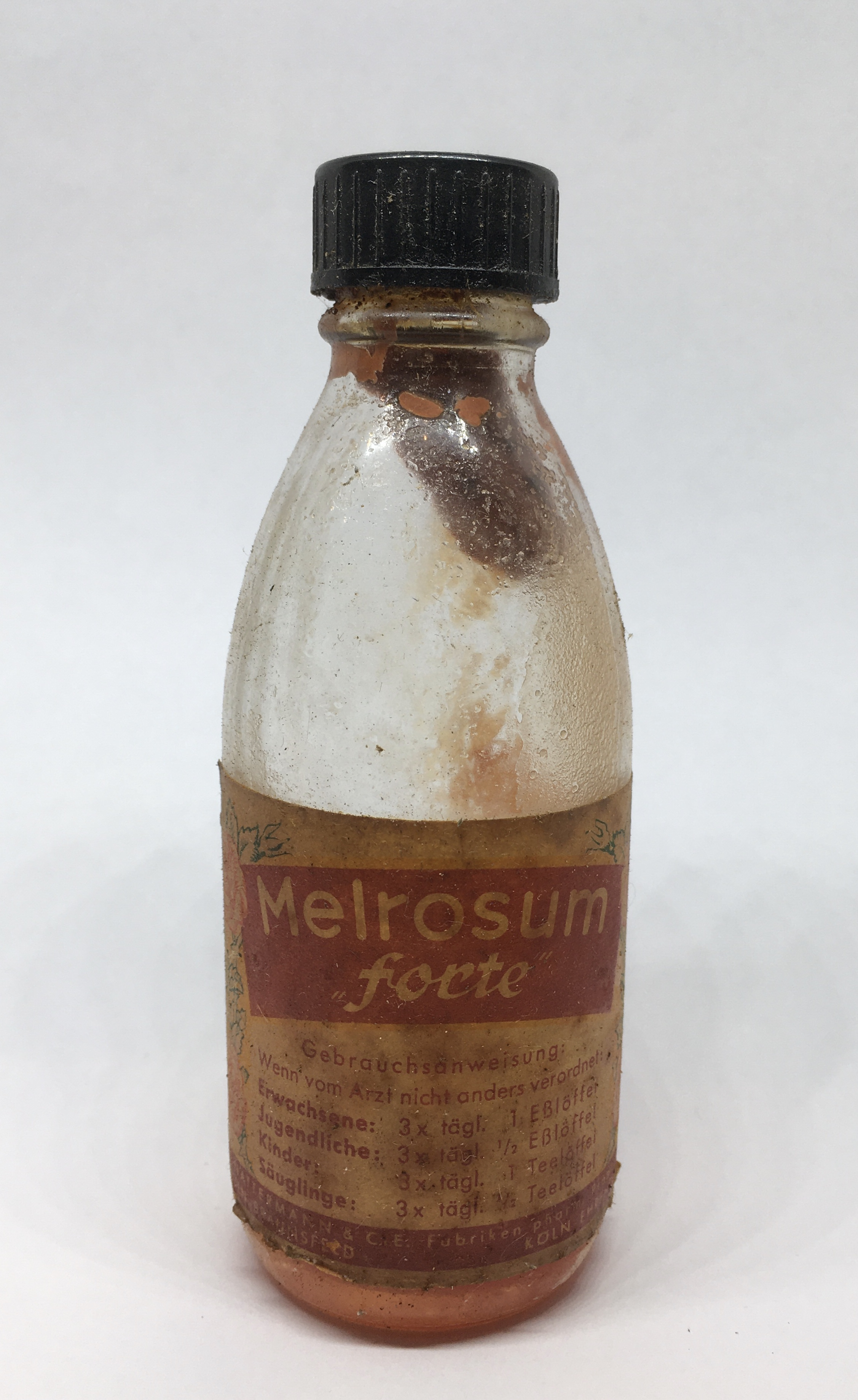
Cough syrup Melrosum forte by Nattermann

In 1950, the company generated 4.2 million Deutsche Mark (DM) in revenue with 284 employees. By 1964, with 654 employees, revenue had grown to 24.4 million Mark. By 1974, 2,495 employees were generating a worldwide turnover of 248 million Mark, and in 1980, approximately 2,000 employees contributed to a revenue of 315 million Mark.

Since 1952, "Dr. Schieffer Pharmaceuticals GmbH" was a part of the expanding Nattermann Group. The company's trademark, "Phytostandard Nattermann", was known for its consistent and precise formulation of active ingredients. It became a symbol of quality for modern natural medicine in 1956. Once physicians and initially hesitant pharmacists recognized the benefits, Nattermann's rise among German pharmaceutical manufacturers was unstoppable, eventually ranking 6th in the country.

In 1958, the company introduced the first tea preparations packaged in tubes to preserve the natural composition of medicinal plants.

In 1961, the company entered in co-operation with Spanish pharmaceutical company Industrial Farmacéutica de Zaragoza S.A. (INFAR) and a joint venture INFAR-Nattermann was established.

The new company headquarters was established in 1965 at Nattermannallee 1, in Cologne-Bocklemünd. The street was named after the company's founder, a common practice in Cologne. While constructing the new site, the northernmost Linear Pottery culture settlement dating from around 4200 BC was discovered and partially excavated. The new premises included a distinctive administrative building, production facilities, and an area for growing medicinal plants. The company moved into this new location in August 1967.

By 1972, the company had increased its turnover from 176 to 193 million DM, with global sales going from 227 million DM to 244 million DM. This was a period when Nattermann secured a strong market position in areas such as laxatives and respiratory medications.

In 1973, a pharmaceutical factory was built in Bocklemünd, consolidating parts of the company that were spread across Cologne. The co-founder's son, Rolf Lappe, served as the managing director until May 1980, after which he joined the supervisory board.

In 1973, the joint venture INFAR-Nattermann built pharmaceutical factory in Zaragoza, Spain.

In 1981, due to changes in the health sector's "negative list", Nattermann suffered losses for the first time. To counter this, the family-owned company acquired the US pharmaceutical manufacturer "Lemmon Company, Sellersville" for 20 million US dollars. However, the US subsidiary's losses pushed Nattermann further into the red, forcing the company to sell 40% of its property, including the main office in Cologne, in 1983. This sale, called a sale-lease-back, brought in 42 million DM. The profit of over 10 million DM in 1983 came largely from the reserves resulting from this transaction.

By January 1985, Nattermann had concentrated all manufacturing on the company grounds in Bocklemünd, incurring construction costs of 200 million DM since 1965.

In December 1985, the company was able to sell its loss-making US subsidiary, Lemmon, to Teva for 13 million US dollars, but this did not resolve Nattermann's financial difficulties. The family shareholders were unable to compensate for the accumulated losses.

== Company Sale ==
As a result, in September 1986 the family-owned Nattermann company was sold to the French chemical and pharmaceutical group Rhône-Poulenc. In December 1999, the latter merged with Hoechst AG to form a new company called Aventis, which in turn was acquired by Sanofi in December 2004. Since then, Nattermann has belonged to Sanofi. Under the direction of Sanofi, Nattermannallee today employs 440 people producing 100 million packages of medicines annually. Nattermann manufactures around 15% of its products for the German market, 85% are exported worldwide, especially to France.

The administrative building was transferred to the biotechnology park "BioCampus Cologne" in April 2002, where Nattermann continues to be headquartered. The former headquarters was renovated until January 2006.

The former joint venture INFAR-Nattermann in Spain was sold to Rhône-Poulenc in 1989. The factory in Zaragoza was sold to Bentley Corporation, later Bentley Pharmaceuticals Inc and was named as Laboratorios BELMAC S.A. in 1991. Teva acquired the Bentley Pharmaceuticals and it's Zaragoza facilities in 2008.
