= Båstad Church =

- St. Mary's Church
- Båstads kyrka, Mariakyrkan
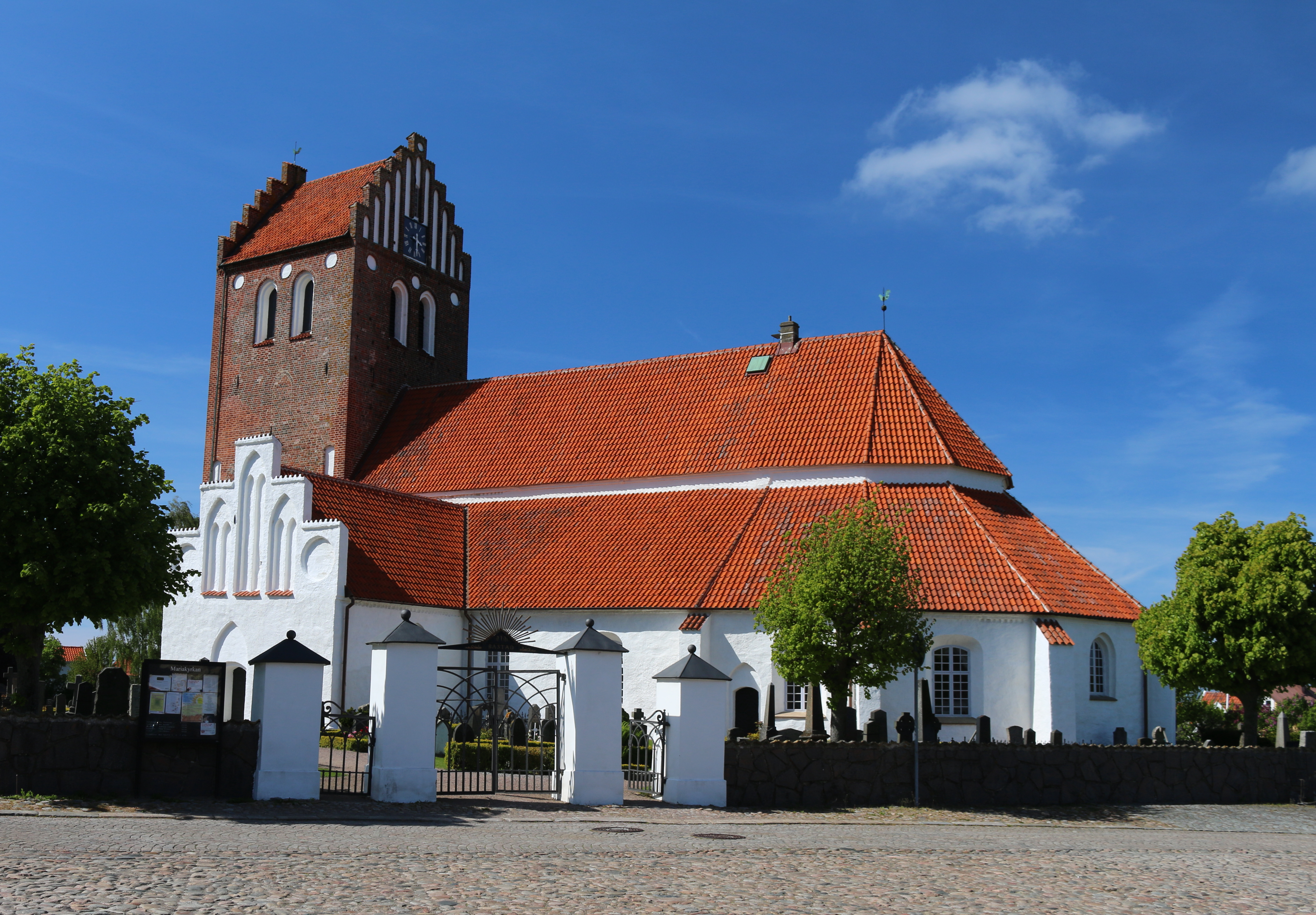
- Båstad Church in May 2015

- Location within Skåne Location within Sweden
- 56°26′1.41813″N 12°50′7.2863″E
- Location: Båstad, Skåne
- Country: Sweden
- Denomination: Church of Sweden

Administration
- Diocese: Diocese of Lund

Båstad Church (Swedish: Båstads kyrka), also known as St. Mary's Church (Mariakyrkan), is a medieval Lutheran church built in the Romanesque style. Located in Båstad, seat of Skåne County in southern Sweden, it belongs to the Diocese of Lund.

== History and architecture ==
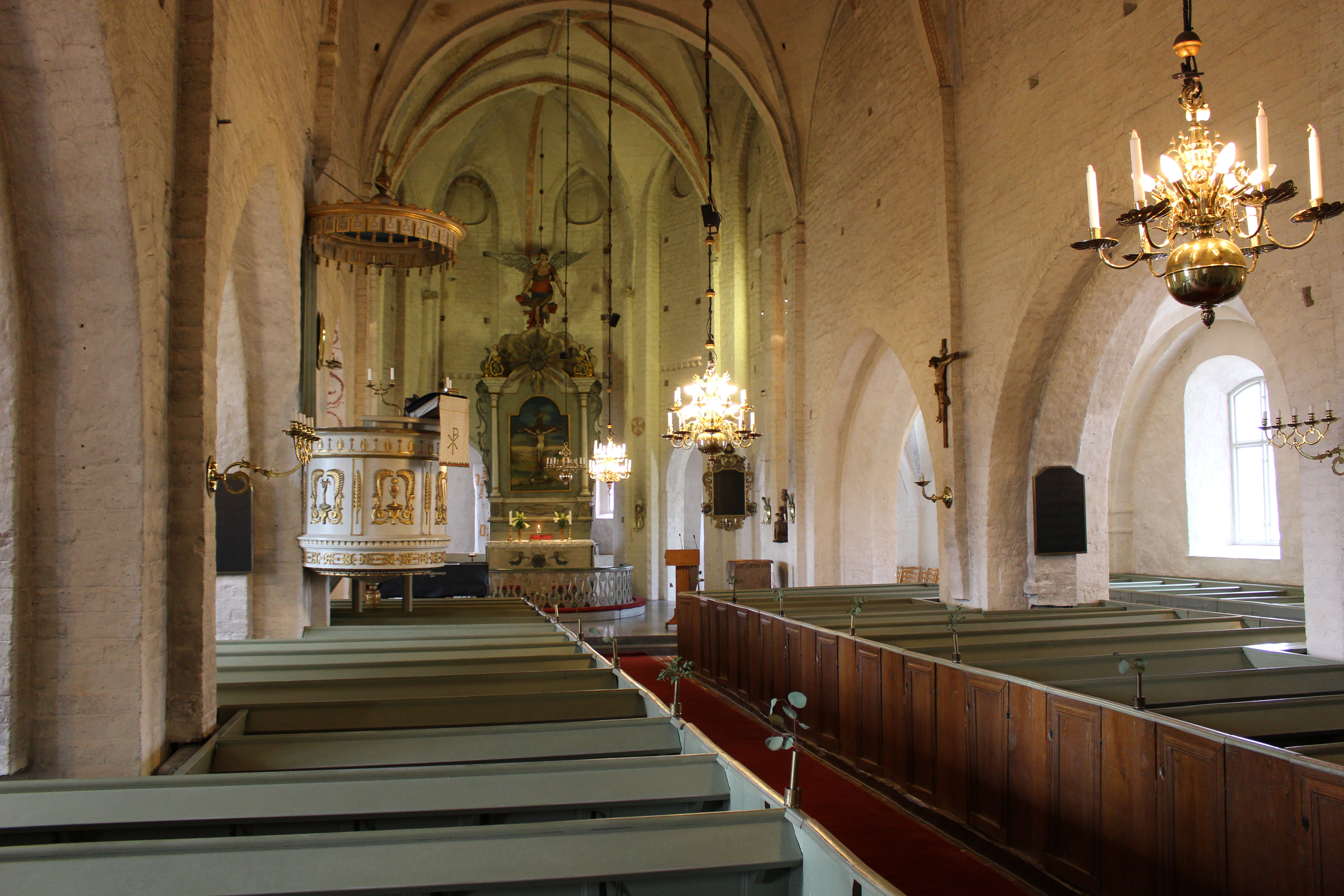
Interior, view towards the choir

The church was built in the Romanesque style in the 15th century. Remarkably large for its day, it consisted of a nave flanked on either side by aisles. The hexagonal choir wall at the eastern end of the building was completed in the 1470s and is reminiscent of that in St Mary's Church, Ystad. The brick tower was built around 1500, giving the church its present appearance.

== Interior ==
The font, inscribed with runes, perpetuates the memory of a certain Per Knudsen. The wooden Madonna, bearing the infant Jesus, dates from the church's establishment. The other old Danish furnishings, including the altar, pulpit and epitaphs, were destroyed during an attack.

== Murals ==
The church walls and vaults contain late Gothic murals painted by different 15th century masters. On the chancel wall, there is a painting of the martyrdom of Saint Erasmus with two executioners opening his stomach while God leads his soul into heaven. In the nave, the east vault displays three male heads while an arch to the south aisle has vestiges of Christ as a man of sorrow. In the sacristy, there are well preserved murals from the early 16th century depicting the emblems of the Evangelists.
