= Båstad =

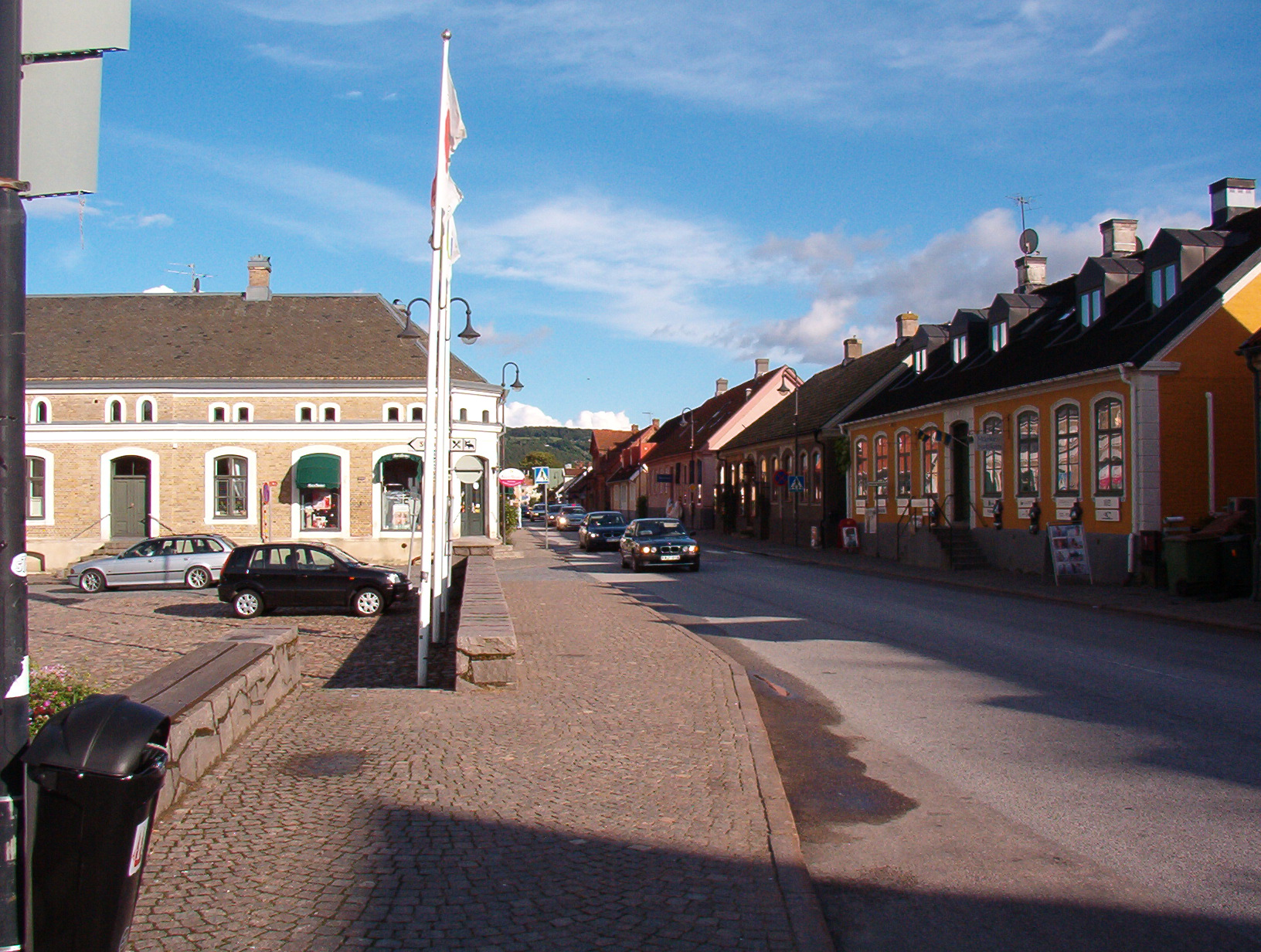
- A street adjacent to the central square

- Flag Coat of arms

- Location within Scania Location within Sweden Location within European Union
- Coordinates: 56°26′N 12°50′E
- Country: Sweden
- Province: Scania
- County: Scania County
- Municipality: Båstad Municipality

Area
  - Total: 6.27 km^{2} (2.42 sq mi)

Population (31 December 2023)
  - Total: 7,073
  - Density: 792/km^{2} (2,050/sq mi)
- Time zone: UTC+1 (CET)
  - Summer (DST): UTC+2 (CEST)
- Website: http://www.bastad.se

Båstad (Swedish pronunciation: [ˈbôːsta(d)]) is a locality and the seat of Båstad Municipality, Scania County, Sweden, with approximately 7,000 permanent residents. It is however one of Sweden's most typical summer resorts. The population is presumably more than twice as large between April and September, and even larger during July. Its municipality follows a similar pattern: some 15,000 permanent residents, but more than 30,000 during July. Some villages within the municipality are almost empty during the winter, but have more than 2,000 "summer guests" during July. Torekov is a good example of this.

Within Sweden, Båstad is well known for tennis. The largest centre court in Sweden is located in the town's centre, and can take more than 5,000 attendants. Several top national players, such as Björn Borg, Mats Wilander and Stefan Edberg, have played tennis in Båstad.

== Geography ==
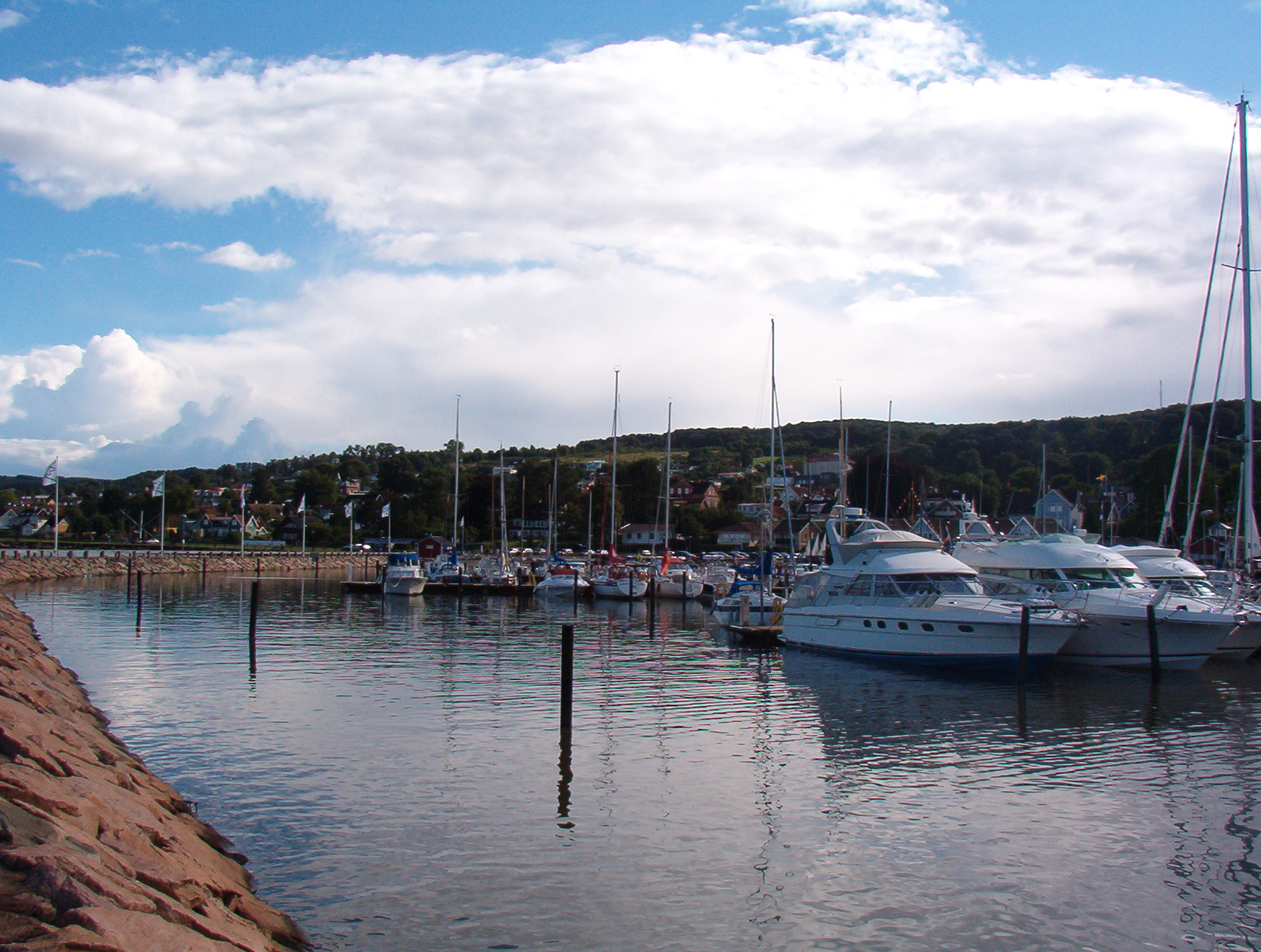
The marina; Hallandian ridge in background

The town of Båstad is located in a sheltered bay with the Hallandian ridge stretching behind it. The town borders the shore, whereafter the terrain raises until the dense vegetation of the ridge takes over.

== History ==
The first city privileges were granted in the 14th or 15th century, when the area belonged to Denmark. The first certain date is 1513 when it was re-granted. At the time, the name in print was Botstœdœ, which would translate to "Boat (landing) place".

In 1658, the area was conquered by Sweden, and Båstad was given new "special" privileges in 1664, because it was of too insignificant size to receive the full royal charter as one of Sweden's cities. The minor privilege allowed the town to be used for commerce, handicraft and hostelry. The minor privilege was in effect until 1858 when it got proper rights as a merchant town, or köping. It has been the seat of Båstad Municipality since 1971.

Båstad is known for its tennis tournament Swedish Open on the ATP Tour, held each summer since 1948. The tournament boasts the largest number of courts in the country, and has fostered many internationally successful tennis players, such as Magnus Larsson. It attracts some 20,000 visitors and puts the town in a festive mood for a few weeks. Since 2009, the women's WTA tournament, previously held in Stockholm, also is played in Båstad as part of the Swedish Open.

The city is also home of the Troentorp Clog, formerly known as Båstad Clogs. Troentorp Clogs have been handcrafted in Båstad since 1907 and continue to be produced with the original wooden design.

The botanist Carl Adolph Agardh was born in Båstad in 1785.

== Sights ==
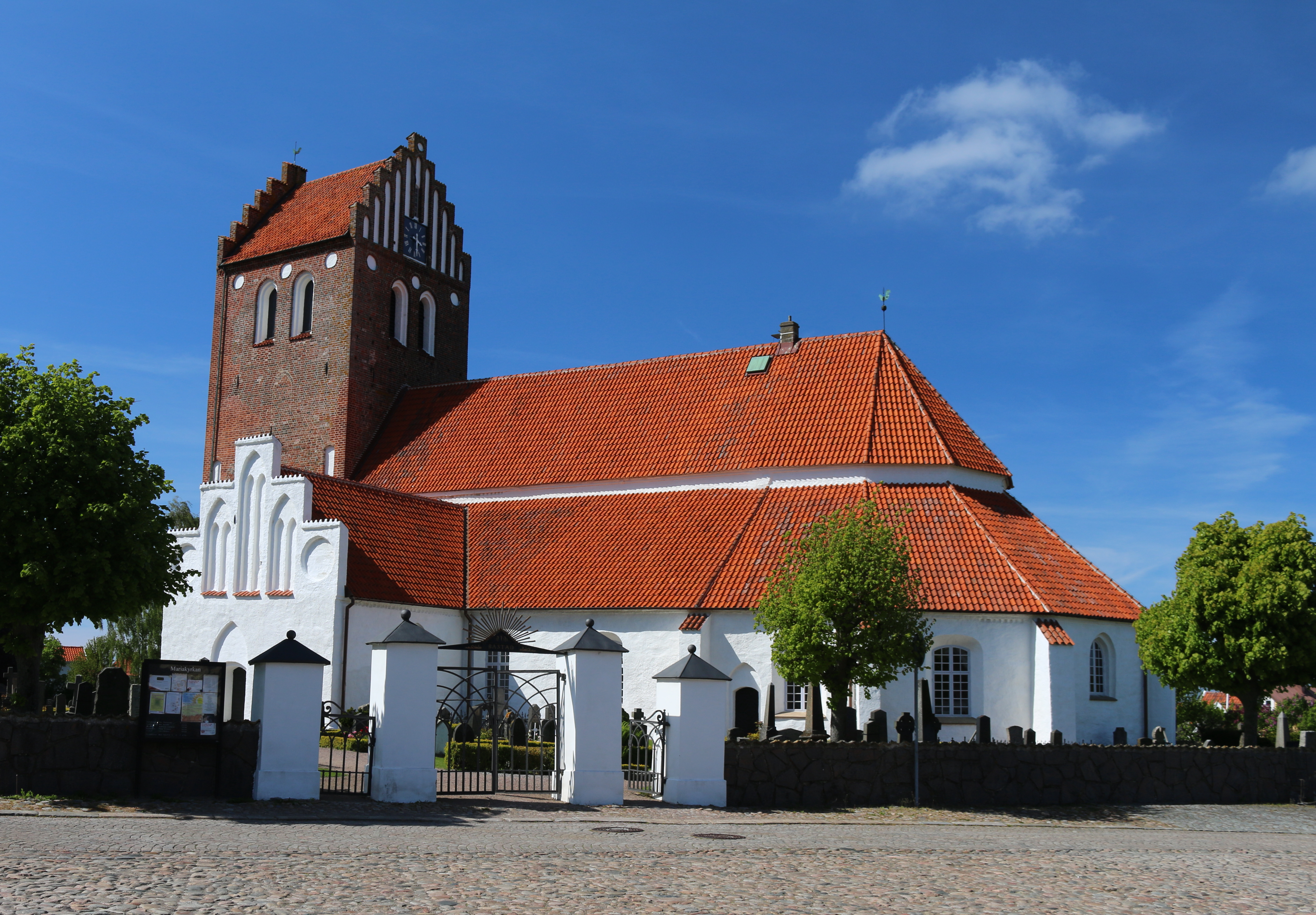
Båstad Church

The Church of Båstad or Saint Mary's Church is located in central Båstad. It was constructed in the 15th century. It is a Romanesque church, and contains several wall paintings from various centuries; a madonna image; and a Danish altarpiece, among other things.

A few kilometers outside of Båstad there is a large garden called Norrviken Gardens, which was founded by Rudolf Abelin in the 1900. It once had been chosen as the most beautiful park in Sweden, and the second most beautiful in Europe in 2006.

== Notable people ==
- Carl Adolph Agardh (1785–1859), botanist
- Mari Andersson (born 1986), former tennis player
- Arne Bjerhammar (1917–2011), geodesist notable for independently describing Moore–Penrose inverse in 1951
- Anders Järryd (born 1961), former tennis player
- Erik Paulsson (born 1942), billionaire businessman
- Anders Silwer (born 1959), former Swedish Air Force officer.
- Yvonne Maria Werner (born 1954), historian and professor

== See also ==
- Troentorp Clogs, formerly known as "Båstad Clogs"
