= Grevie =

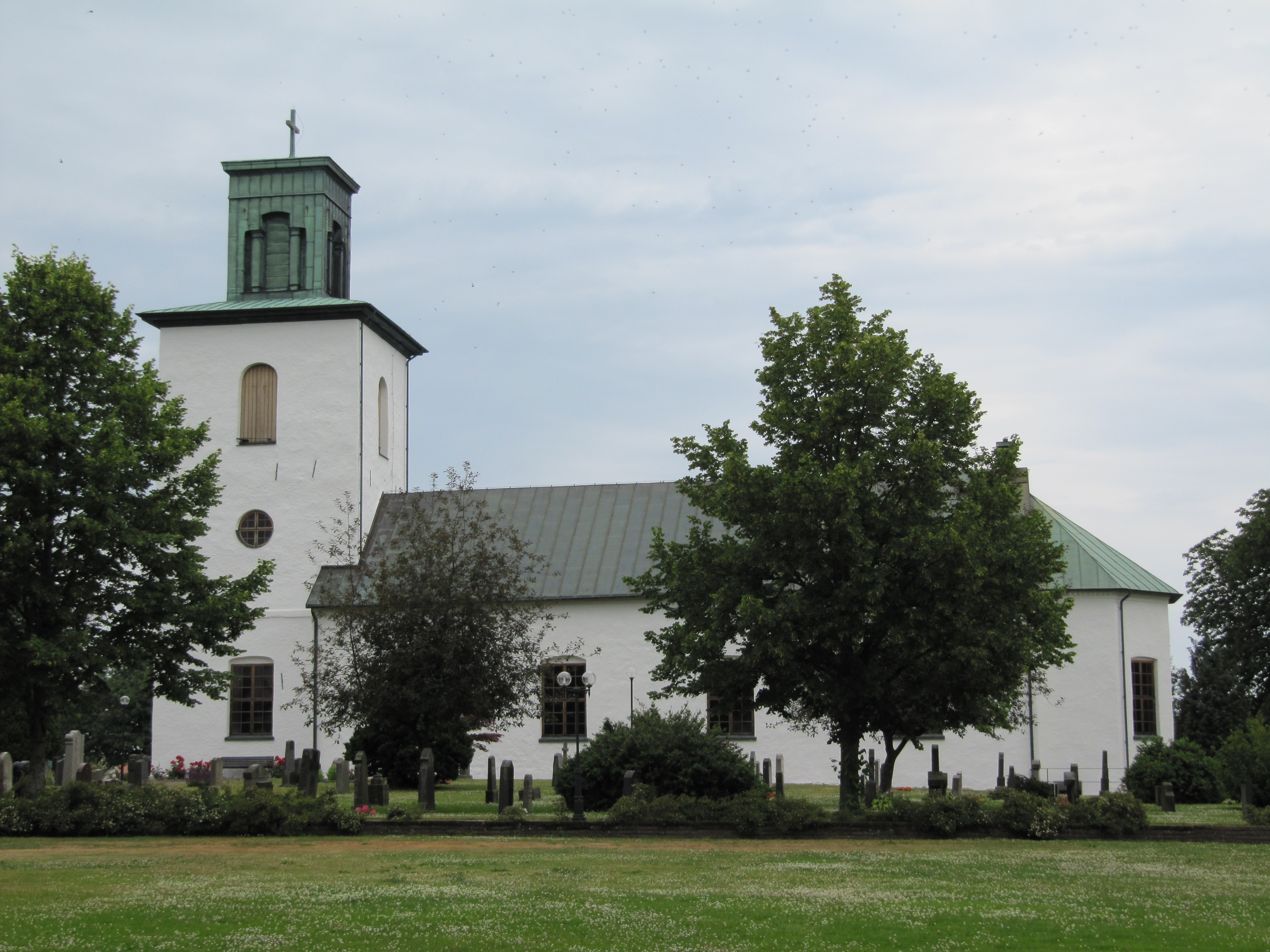
- Grevie Church

- Location within Skåne Location within Sweden
- Coordinates: 56°23′N 12°47′E
- Country: Sweden
- Province: Skåne
- County: Skåne County
- Municipality: Båstad Municipality

Area
  - Total: 1.18 km^{2} (0.46 sq mi)

Population (31 December 2010)
  - Total: 788
  - Density: 666/km^{2} (1,720/sq mi)
- Time zone: UTC+1 (CET)
  - Summer (DST): UTC+2 (CEST)

Grevie is a locality situated in Båstad Municipality, Skåne County, Sweden with 788 inhabitants in 2010.
