= Båstad Municipality =

Båstad Municipality Båstads kommun
- Municipality
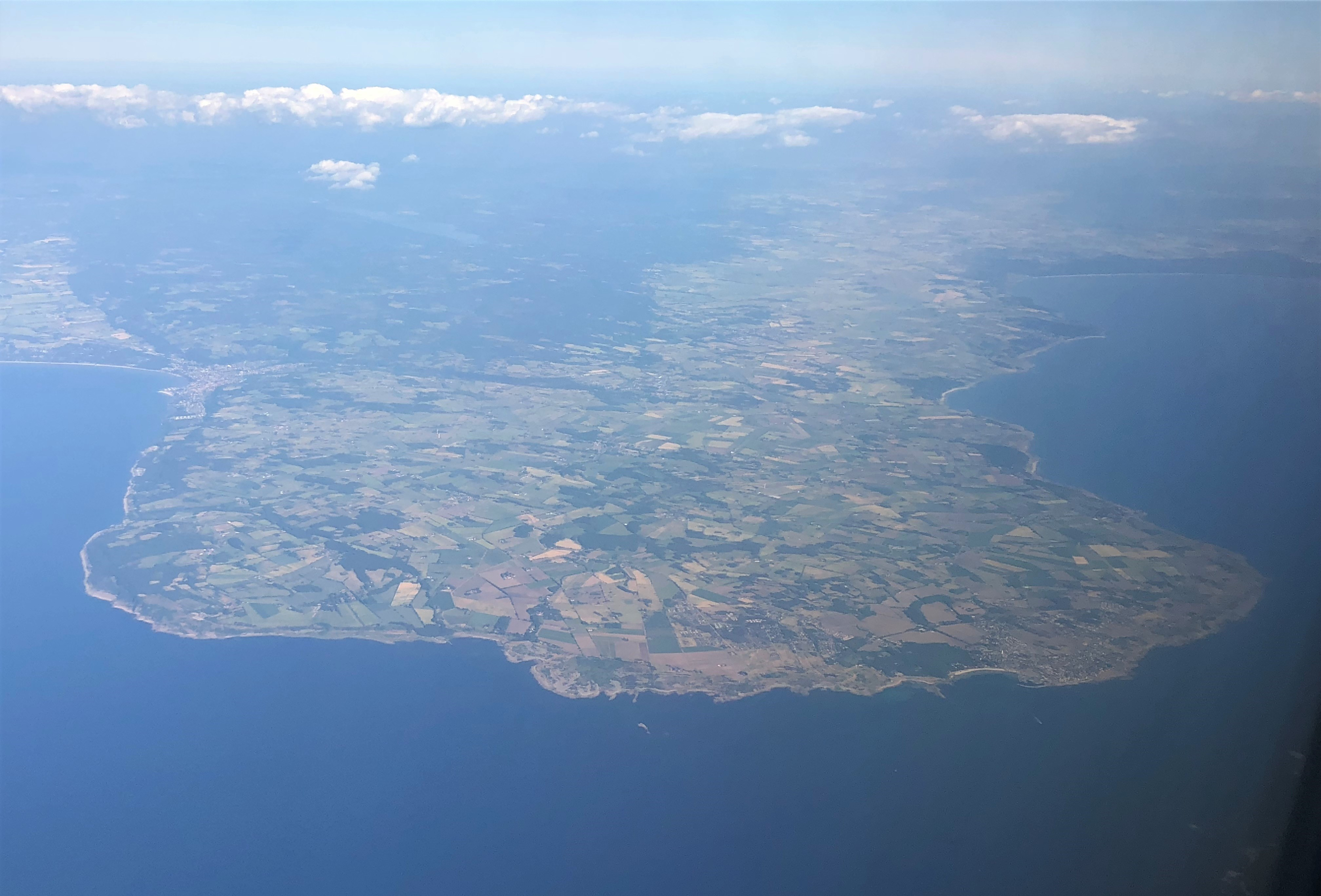

- Flag Coat of arms

- Coordinates: 56°26′N 12°50′E
- Country: Sweden
- National Area: South Sweden
- County: Skåne County
- Seat: Båstad

Area
  - Total: 881.9 km^{2} (340.5 sq mi)
  - Land: 209.79 km^{2} (81.00 sq mi)
  - Water: 672.11 km^{2} (259.50 sq mi)
- Area as of 1 January 2014.

Population (30 June 2025)
  - Total: 16,093
  - Density: 76.710/km^{2} (198.68/sq mi)
- Time zone: UTC+1 (CET)
  - Summer (DST): UTC+2 (CEST)
- ISO 3166 code: SE
- Province: Scania and Halland
- Municipal code: 1278
- Website: www.bastad.se

Båstad Municipality (Swedish: Båstads kommun) is a municipality in Skåne County in South Sweden, located in Sweden. Its seat is located in the town of Båstad.

The present municipality was established in 1971 when the market town (köping) Båstad was amalgamated with the surrounding rural municipalities. One parish was transferred from Halland County.

== Localities ==
There are 6 localities in Båstad Municipality.

In the table they are listed according to the size of the population as of December 31, 2005. The municipal seat is in bold characters.

#	Locality	Population
1	**Båstad**	4,793
2	Förslöv	1,998
3	Torekov	883
4	Grevie	769
5	Östra Karup	563
6	Västra Karup	556

== Demographics ==
This is a demographic table based on Båstad Municipality's electoral districts in the 2022 Swedish general election sourced from SVT's election platform, in turn taken from SCB official statistics.

In total there were 15,624 residents, including 12,600 Swedish citizens of voting age. 35.3% voted for the left coalition and 63.6% for the right coalition. Indicators are in percentage points except population totals and income.

Location	Residents	Citizen adults	Left vote	Right vote	Employed	Swedish parents	Foreign heritage	Income SEK	Degree
Location			%	%					
Båstad V	1,748	1,471	27.3	71.9	73	81	19	25,975	45
Båstad Ö	2,249	1,842	32.4	67.0	74	81	19	23,140	41
Förslöv V	1,632	1,245	42.9	55.7	80	81	19	25,483	37
Förslöv Ö	1,656	1,231	45.7	53.0	83	81	19	26,157	35
Grevie	1,983	1,506	40.5	58.3	84	83	17	26,289	41
Hemmerslöv-Riviera	1,780	1,531	30.3	69.0	84	90	10	29,650	53
Hov	747	616	34.1	64.4	82	87	13	25,714	43
Torekov	938	837	30.0	69.2	70	89	11	24,716	38
Västra Karup	1,712	1,389	36.1	62.7	81	85	15	25,831	42
Östra Karup	1,179	932	34.0	64.7	83	79	21	25,972	34
Source: SVT

== Elections ==
Below are the results since the 1973 municipal reform listed. Between 1988 and 1998 the Sweden Democrats' results were not published by the SCB due to the party's small size nationwide. "Turnout" denotes the percentage of the electorate casting a ballot, but "Votes" only applies to valid ballots cast.

=== Riksdag ===
Year	Turnout	Votes	V	S	MP	C	L	KD	M	SD	ND
1973	90.6	7,146	0.9	21.1	0.0	47.7	8.9	1.0	20.4	0.0	0.0
1976	92.5	7,849	0.7	18.8	0.0	45.9	9.7	0.8	23.2	0.0	0.0
1979	91.5	8,134	0.9	18.2	0.0	34.5	9.8	0.6	34.2	0.0	0.0
1982	92.0	8,458	0.8	19.1	1.9	29.6	6.9	0.9	40.1	0.0	0.0
1985	90.1	8,579	1.1	19.3	1.8	24.4	16.6	0.0	36.3	0.0	0.0
1988	86.7	8,462	1.0	21.3	5.9	23.8	13.6	1.8	32.3	0.0	0.0
1991	87.3	9,077	0.8	16.4	2.9	17.0	8.5	7.5	36.2	0.0	9.7
1994	86.1	9,167	1.6	22.8	4.5	17.0	6.7	4.5	40.1	0.0	2.2
1998	81.5	8,890	4.3	18.4	3.6	10.8	5.3	17.5	37.4	0.0	0.0
2002	79.7	8,799	3.0	21.3	3.6	11.3	15.3	14.9	27.1	2.5	0.0
2006	82.7	9,349	1.8	18.2	3.7	12.7	7.7	8.4	41.8	3.6	0.0
2010	85.3	9,769	1.9	15.3	5.5	12.1	7.4	7.2	44.1	5.6	0.0
2014	86.9	10,086	2.2	18.2	6.3	10.1	6.1	5.4	34.7	14.8	0.0

Blocs

This lists the relative strength of the socialist and centre-right blocs since 1973, but parties not elected to the Riksdag are inserted as "other", including the Sweden Democrats results from 1988 to 2006, but also the Christian Democrats pre-1991 and the Greens in 1982, 1985 and 1991. The sources are identical to the table above. The coalition or government mandate marked in bold formed the government after the election. New Democracy got elected in 1991 but are still listed as "other" due to the short lifespan of the party. "Elected" is the total number of percentage points from the municipality that went to parties who were elected to the Riksdag.

Year	Turnout	Votes	Left	Right	SD	Other	Elected
1973	90.6	7,146	**22.0**	77.0	0.0	1.0	99.0
1976	92.5	7,849	19.5	**78.8**	0.0	1.7	98.3
1979	91.5	8,134	19.1	**78.5**	0.0	2.4	97.6
1982	92.0	8,458	**19.9**	76.6	0.0	3.5	96.5
1985	90.1	8,579	**20.4**	77.3	0.0	2.3	97.7
1988	86.7	8,462	**28.2**	69.7	0.0	2.1	97.9
1991	87.3	9,077	17.2	**69.2**	0.0	13.6	96.1
1994	86.1	9,167	**28.9**	68.3	0.0	2.8	97.2
1998	81.5	8,890	**26.3**	71.0	0.0	2.7	97.3
2002	79.7	8,799	**28.0**	68.6	0.0	3.4	96.6
2006	82.7	9,349	23.7	**70.6**	0.0	5.7	94.3
2010	85.3	9,769	22.7	**70.8**	5.6	0.9	99.1
2014	86.9	10,086	**26.7**	56.3	14.8	2.2	97.8

== Hallandian ridge ==
Extending through the municipality, marking the border to the province Halland, is the ridge of Hallandia, or Hallandsåsen. It is one of the highest points in the otherwise flat-terrained Scania, with a height of 226 meters.

The ridge reached the public eye in 1997, when the construction of the Hallandsås Tunnel through the ridge caused fishes in the streams to die and cows grazing on the ridge to become paralyzed due to the poisonous substance acrylamide used by the digging company to counteract the high level of groundwater in the ridge.
