= Förslöv =

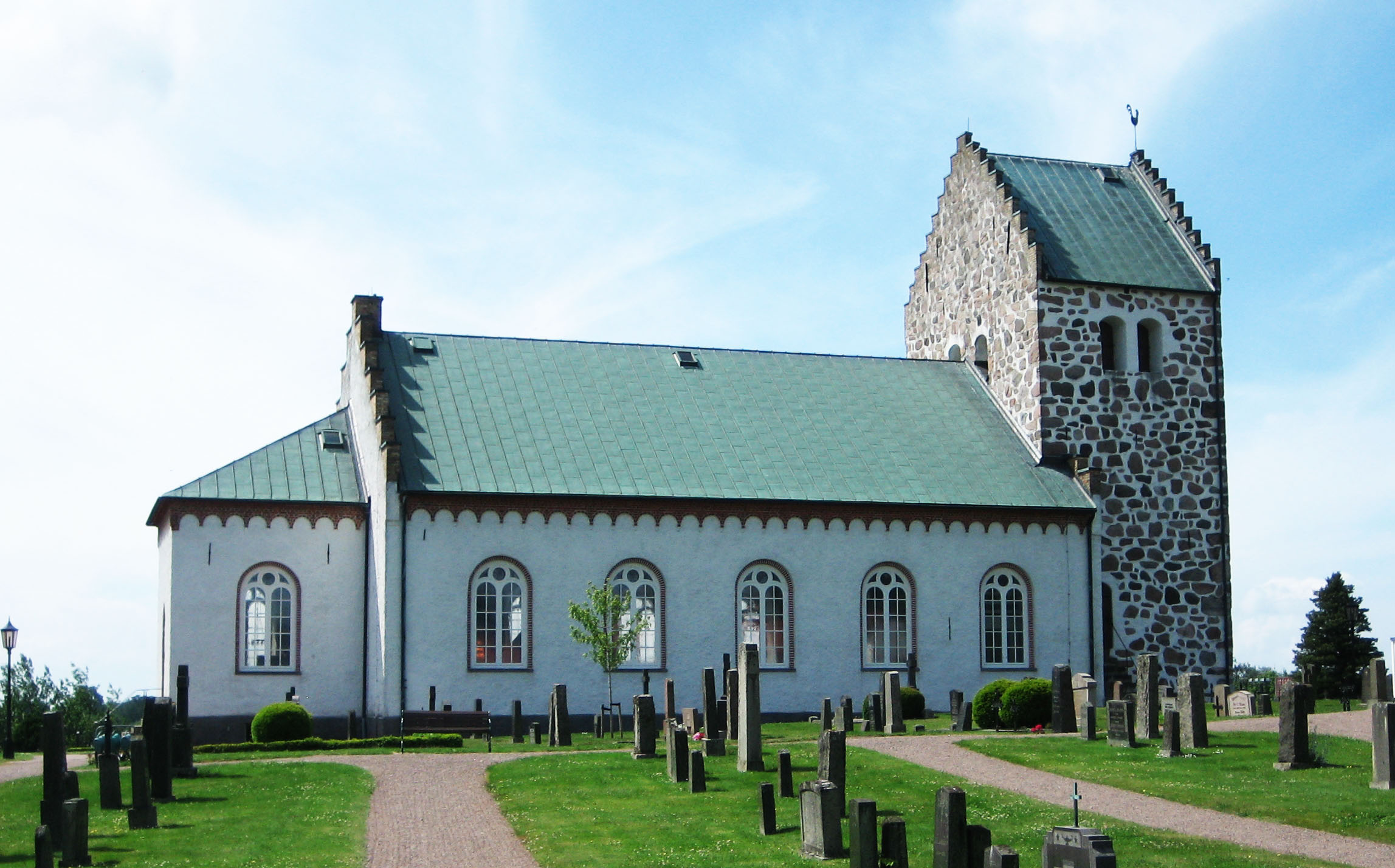
- Förslöv Church

- Location within Skåne Location within Sweden
- Coordinates: 56°21′N 12°49′E
- Country: Sweden
- Province: Skåne
- County: Skåne County
- Municipality: Båstad Municipality

Area
  - Total: 1.84 km^{2} (0.71 sq mi)

Population (31 December 2010)
  - Total: 2,085
  - Density: 1,133/km^{2} (2,930/sq mi)
- Time zone: UTC+1 (CET)
  - Summer (DST): UTC+2 (CEST)

Förslöv is a locality situated in Båstad Municipality, Skåne County, Sweden with 2,085 inhabitants in 2010.
