= Oslo Airport, Gardermoen =

International airport serving Oslo, Norway

Oslo Airport Oslo lufthavn

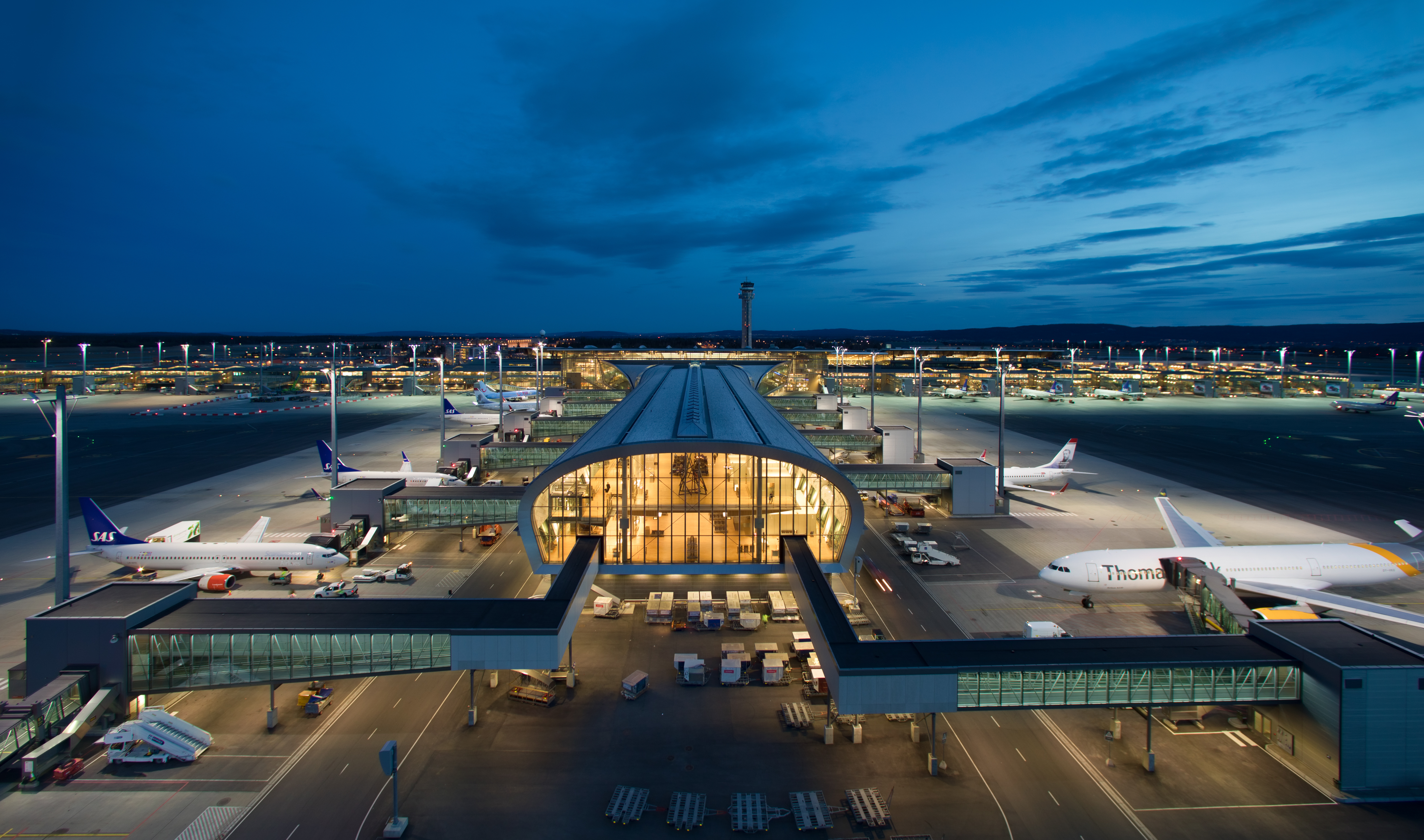
- IATA: OSL; ICAO: ENGM; WMO: 01384

Summary
- Airport type: Public / military
- Owner: Ministry of Transport
- Operator: Avinor
- Serves: Greater Oslo Region
- Location: Gardermoen, Norway
- Opened: 8 October 1998; 28 years ago
- Hub for: Scandinavian Airlines
- Operating base for: Norse Atlantic Airways; Norwegian Air Shuttle; Widerøe
- Elevation AMSL: 208 m (682 ft)
- Coordinates: 60°12′10″N 011°05′02″E
- Website: www.osl.no

Maps
- Airport map

- Location in Akershus county Location of Akershus in Norway OSL/ENGM (Norway)

Runways
Direction	Length		Surface
Direction	m	ft	Surface
01L/19R	3,600	11,811	Asphalt
01R/19L	2,950	9,678	Asphalt

Statistics (2025)
- Passengers: 27,068,787
- International: 15,965,065
- Domestic: 11,103,722
- Aircraft movements: 224,416
- Cargo (t): 170,343

Oslo Airport (IATA: OSL, ICAO: ENGM), alternatively referred to as Oslo Gardermoen Airport or simply Gardermoen, is an international airport serving Oslo, the capital and most populous city of Norway. The airport is the second largest in Scandinavia and the Nordics. It is a hub for Scandinavian Airlines and an operating base for Norwegian Air Shuttle, Norse Atlantic Airways and Widerøe. As of 2025, it was connected to 31 domestic and 164 international destinations.

The airport is located 19 nautical miles (35 km; 22 mi) northeast of Oslo, at Gardermoen at the border of municipalities Nannestad and Ullensaker, in Akershus county. It has two parallel roughly north–south runways measuring 3,600 metres (11,811 ft) and 2,950 metres (9,678 ft) and 71 aircraft stands, of which 50 have jet bridges. The airport is connected to the city center by the high-speed railway Gardermoen Line served by mainline trains and Flytoget. The percentage of passengers using public transport to get to and from the airport is one of the highest in the world at nearly 70%. The ground facilities are owned by Oslo Lufthavn AS, a subsidiary of the state-owned Avinor. Also at the premises is Gardermoen Air Station, operated by the Royal Norwegian Air Force. An expansion with a new terminal building and a third pier opened in late April 2017.

The airport location was first used by the Norwegian Army from 1940, with the first military airport facilities being built during the 1940s. The airport remained a secondary reserve and airport for chartered flights to Oslo Airport, Fornebu, until 8 October 1998, when the latter was closed, and an all-new Oslo Airport opened at Gardermoen, costing NOK11.4 billion. In 1998, the airport code was changed from "GEN" to "OSL".

Oslo is also served by the much smaller Sandefjord Torp Airport, which is situated 119 km (74 mi) to the south of downtown Oslo and primarily used by leisure and low-cost carriers.

== History ==
=== Military and secondary ===
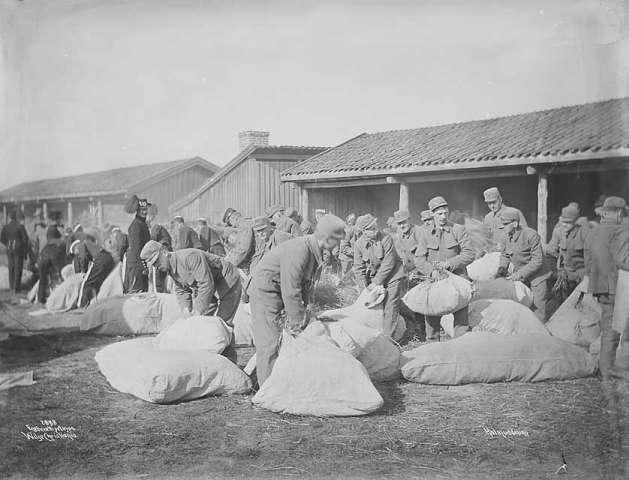
Gardermoen in 1904, while it was still an army camp

The Norwegian army started using Gardermoen as a camp in 1740, although it was called Fredericksfeldt until 1788. It was first used by the cavalry, then by the dragoons and in 1789 by the riding marines. The base was also taken into use by the infantry from 1834 and by the artillery from 1860. Tents were solely used until 1860, when the first barracks and stalls were taken into use. Insulated buildings were built around 1900, allowing the camp to be used year-round. By 1925, the base had eleven camps and groups of buildings. The first flight at Gardermoen happened in 1912, and Gardermoen became a station for military flights.

During the occupation of Norway by Nazi Germany, the Luftwaffe took over Gardermoen, and built the first proper airport facilities with hangars and two crossing runways, both 2,000 metres (6,600 ft) long. After World War II, the airport was taken over by the Norwegian Air Force and made the main air station. Three fighter and one transport squadron were stationed at Gardermoen.

Braathens SAFE established their technical base at the airport in 1946, but left two years later. Gardermoen also became the reserve airport for Oslo Airport, Fornebu, when the latter was closed due to fog. From 1946 to 1952, when a longer runway was built at Fornebu, all intercontinental traffic was moved to Gardermoen. Gardermoen grew up as a training field for the commercial airlines and as local airport for general aviation. Some commercial traffic returned again in 1960, when SAS received its first Sud Aviation Caravelle jet aircraft, that could not use the runway at Fornebu until it was extended again in 1962. SAS introduced a direct flight to New York in 1962, but it was quickly terminated.

In 1972, capacity restraints forced the authorities to move all charter traffic from Fornebu to Gardermoen. However, SAS and Braathens SAFE were allowed to keep their charter services from Fornebu, so they would not have to operate from two bases. A former hangar was converted to a terminal building and in 1974 passenger numbers were at 269,000 per year. In 1978, SAS started a weekly flight to New York. In 1983, further restrictions were enforced, and also SAS and Braathens SAFE had to move their charter operations to Gardermoen, increasing passenger numbers that year to 750,000. Several expansions of runway were made after the war, and by the 1985-extension the north–south runway was 3,050 metres (10,010 ft).

=== Localization debate ===
The first airports to serve Oslo were Kjeller Airport which opened in 1912 and Gressholmen Airport which served seaplanes after its opening in 1926. Norway's first airline, Det Norske Luftfartrederi, was founded in 1918 and the first scheduled flights were operated by Deutsche Luft Hansa to Germany with the opening of Gressholmen. In 1939, a new combined sea and land airport opened at Fornebu. It was gradually expanded, with a runway capable of jet aircraft opening in 1962 and a new terminal building in 1964. But due to its location on a peninsula about 8 kilometres (5.0 mi) from the city center and close to large residential areas, it would not be possible to expand the airport sufficiently to meet all foreseeable demands in the future. Following the 1972 decision to move charter traffic to Gardermoen, politicians were forced to choose between a "divided solution" that planners stated would eventually force all international traffic to move to Gardermoen, or to build a new airport.

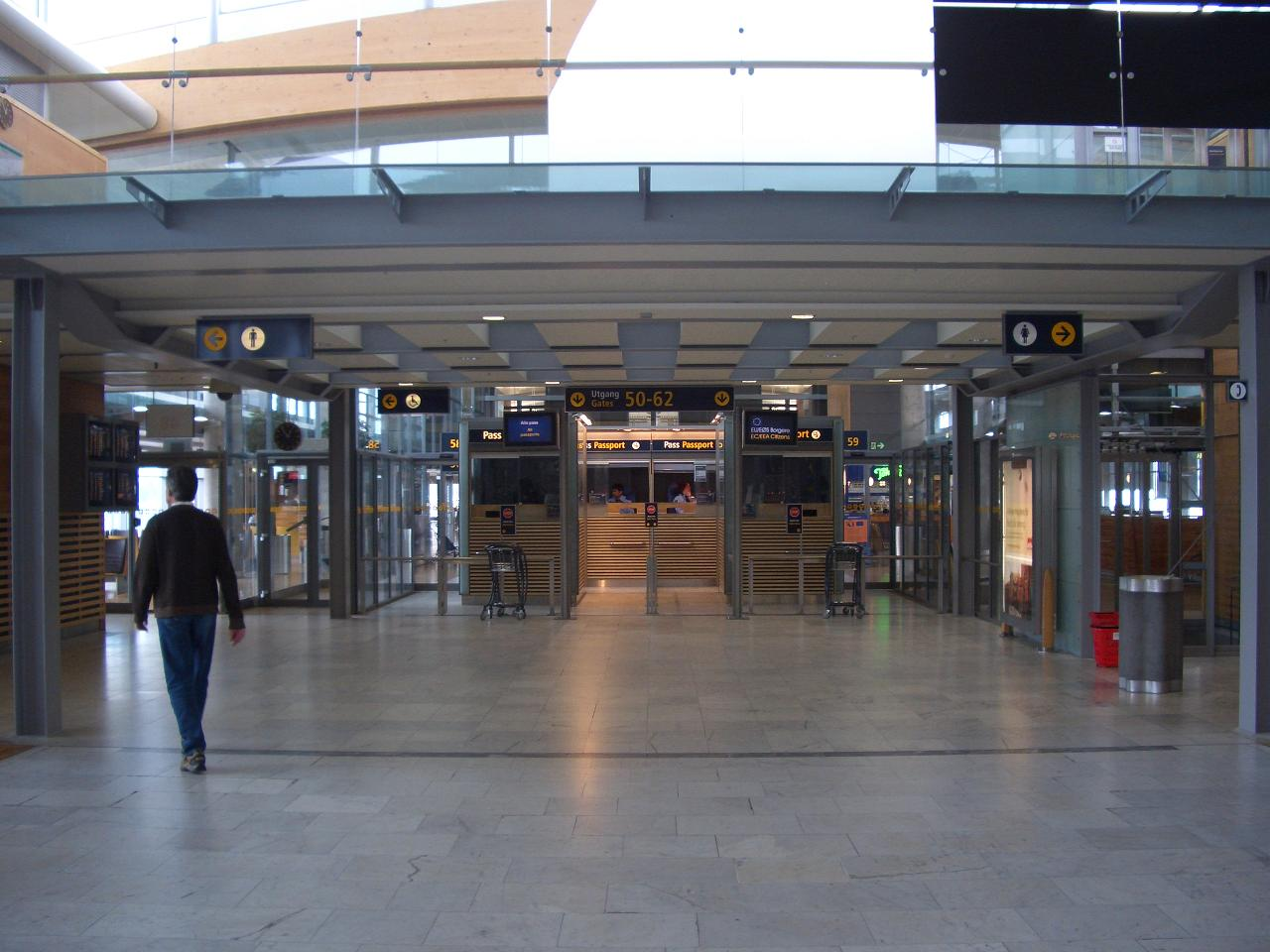
Passport control

Gardermoen had been proposed as the main airport for Oslo and Eastern Norway as early as 1946, both by the local newspaper Romerikes Blad and by Ludvig G. Braathen, who had just founded Braathens SAFE. In 1970, a government report recommended that a new main airport be built at Hobøl, but stated that the time was still not right. The areas were therefore reserved. During the 1970s, it became a political priority by the socialist and center parties to reduce state investments in Eastern Norway to stimulate growth in rural areas. In 1983, parliament voted to keep the divided solution permanently and expand Fornebu with a larger terminal.

By 1985, traffic had increased so much that it became clear that by 1988 all international traffic would have to move to Gardermoen. The areas at Hobøl had been freed up, and a government report was launched recommending that a new airport be built at Gardermoen, although an airport at Hurum had also been surveyed. However, the report did not look into the need of the Air Force that was stationed at Gardermoen and was therefore rejected by the parliament the following year. In 1988, a majority of the government chose Hurum as their preferred location, and the Minister of Transport Kjell Borgen withdrew from his position. In 1989, new weather surveys from Hurum showed unfavorable conditions. There were large protests from meteorologists and pilots who stated that the surveys were manipulated. Two government committees were appointed, and both concluded that there were no irregularities in the surveys.

Since Hurum could no longer be used, the government again recommended Gardermoen as the location. The Conservative Party instead wanted to build at Hobøl, but chose to support the Labour Party government's proposal to get a new airport as quickly as possible. Parliament passed legislation to build the new main airport at Gardermoen on 8 August 1992. At the same time, it was decided that a high-speed railway was to be built to Gardermoen, so the airport would have a 50% public transport market share.

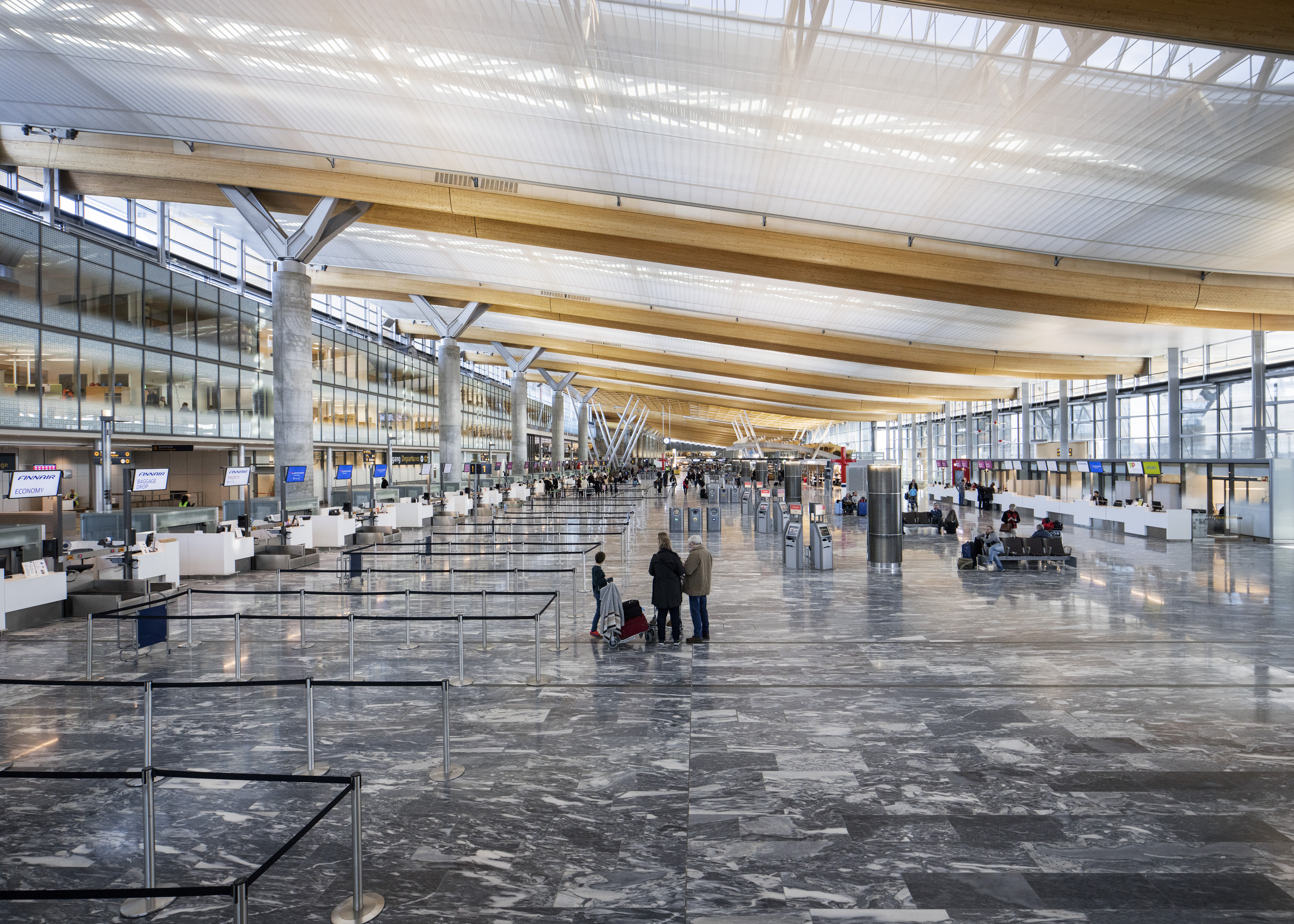
Check-in area

The choice of Gardermoen has spurred controversy, also after the matter was settled in parliament. In 1994, Engineer Jan Fredrik Wiborg, who claimed that falsified weather reports had been made, died after falling from a hotel window in Copenhagen. Circumstances about his death were never fully cleared up and documents about the weather case disappeared. The Standing Committee on Scrutiny and Constitutional Affairs held a hearing about the planning process trying to identify any irregularities. An official report was released in 2001.

=== Construction ===
To minimize the effect of using state grants to invest in Eastern Norway, parliament decided that the construction and operation of the airport was to be done by an independent limited company that would be wholly owned by the Civil Airport Administration (Avinor). This model was chosen to avoid having to deal with public trade unions and to ensure that the construction was not subject to annual grants. This company was founded in 1992 as Oslo Hovedflyplass AS, but changed its name in 1996 to Oslo Lufthavn. From 1 January 1997, it also took over the operation of Oslo Airport, Fornebu. The company was established with NOK 200 million in share capital. The remaining assets were NOK 2 billion from the sale of Fornebu and NOK 900 million in responsible debt. The remaining funding would come from debt from the state. Total investments for the airport, railways and roads were NOK 22 billion, of which Oslo Lufthavn would have a debt of NOK 11 billion after completion.

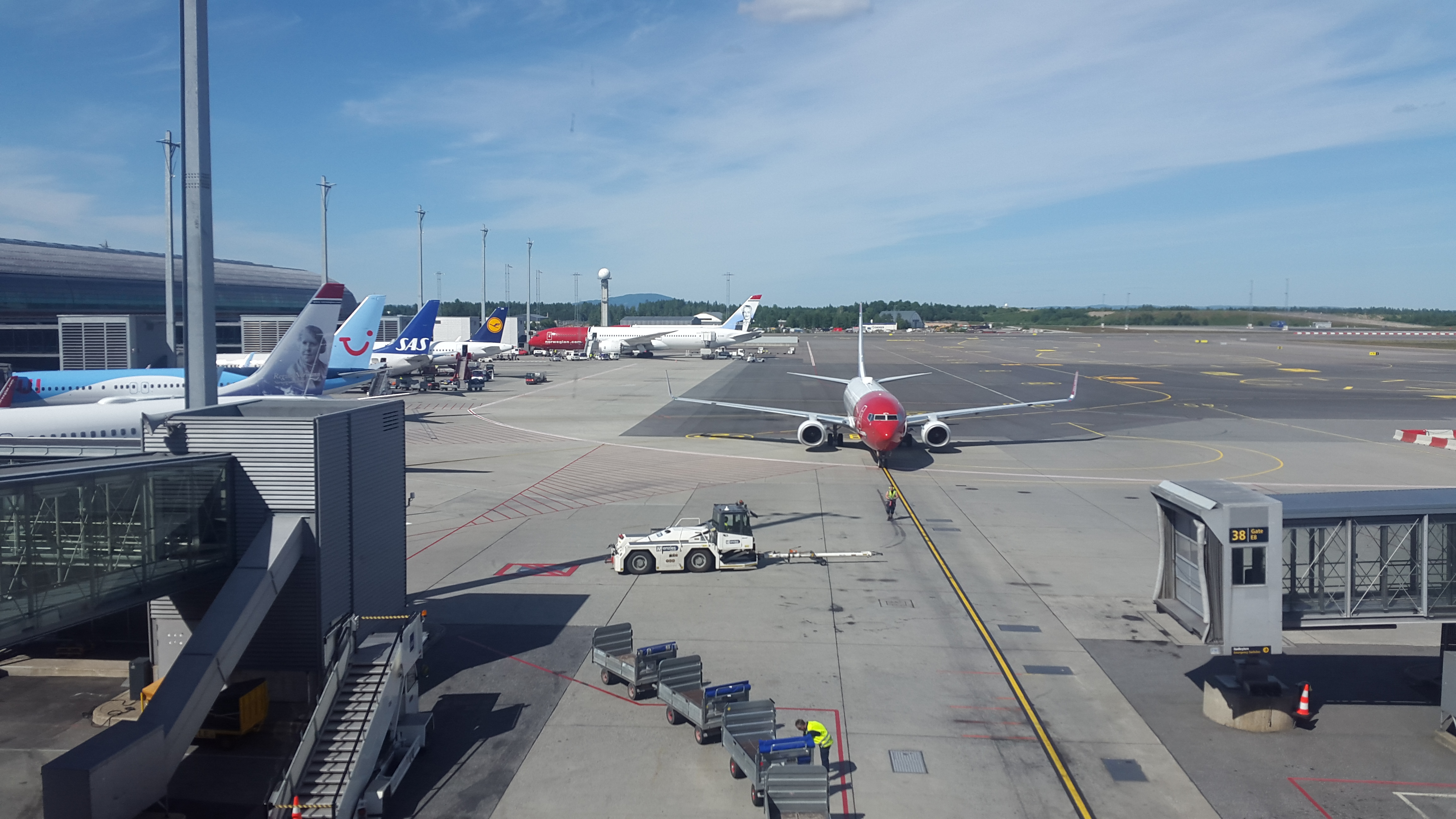
Aircraft parked at the North Pier

At Gardermoen there was both an air station and about 270 house owners that had their real estate expropriated following parliament's decision. NOK 1.7 billion were used to purchase land, including the Air Force. It was the state that expropriated and bought all the land and remained land owner, while Oslo Lufthavn leases the ground from the state. The first two years were used to demolish and rebuild the air station. This reduced the building area from 120,000 to 41,000 square metres (1,290,000 to 440,000 sq ft), but gave a more functional design.

Construction of the new main airport started on 13 August 1994. The western runway was already in place, and had been renovated by the Air Force in 1989. A new, eastern runway needed to be built. A hill at the airport was blown away, and the masses used to fill in where needed. The construction of the airport and railway required 13,000 man-years. 220 subcontractors were used, and working accidents were at a third of the national average, without any fatalities. The last flights to Fornebu took place on 7 October 1998. That night, 300 people and 500 truckloads transported equipment from Fornebu to Gardermoen. Oslo Airport was officially opened on 8 October 1998, with the name Gardermoen. Gardermoen is a compound of the farm name Garder and the finite form of mo 'moor; drill ground' (thus 'the moor belonging to the farm Garder'). The farm is first mentioned in 1328 (Garðar), and the name is the plural of Norse garðr 'fence'.

The airlines needed to build their own facilities at Gardermoen. SAS built a complex with 55,000 square metres (590,000 sq ft), including a technical base, cabin storage, garages and cargo terminals, for NOK 1.398 billion. This included a technical base for their fleet of Douglas DC-9 and McDonnell Douglas MD-80-aircraft for NOK 750 million. The cargo handling facility is 21,000 square metres (230,000 sq ft) and was built in cooperation with Posten Norge. SAS also built two lounges in the passenger terminal. Since Braathens had its technical base at Stavanger Airport, Sola, it used NOK 200 million to build facilities. This included a 9,000 square metres (97,000 sq ft) hangar for six aircraft for NOK 100 million.

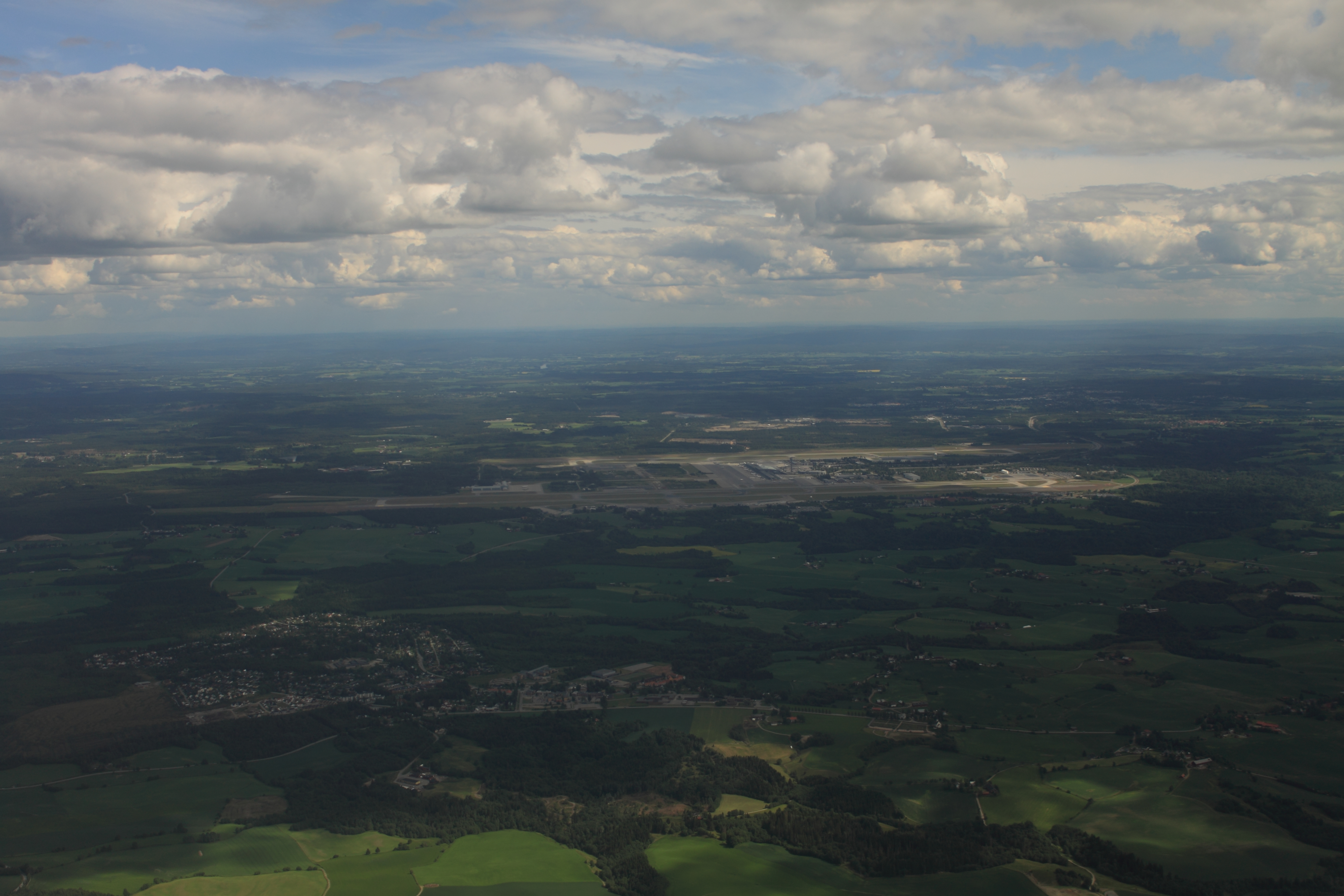
Oslo Airport seen on flyby

Parliament decided to build a high-speed airport rail link from Oslo to Gardermoen. The 64-kilometre (40 mi) Gardermoen Line connects Oslo Central Station (Oslo) to Gardermoen and onwards to Eidsvoll. This line was constructed for 210 kilometres per hour (130 mph) and allows the Flytoget train to operate from Oslo Central station to Gardermoen in nineteen minutes. Just like the airport, the railway was to be financed by the users. The Norwegian State Railways (NSB) established a subsidiary, NSB Gardermobanen, which would build and own the railway line, as well as operate the airport trains. The company would borrow money from the state, and repay with the profits from operation. During construction of the Romerike Tunnel, a leak was made that started draining the water from the lakes above. The time and cost to repair the leaks meant that the whole railway line budget was exceeded, and the tunnel would not be taken into use until 1 August 1999. Since the rest of the railway was finished, two trains (instead of the intended six), operated using more time from the opening of the new airport.

The main road corridor northwards from Oslo to Gardermoen is European Route E6. The E6 was widened to six lanes north to Hvam, and to four lanes north to Gardermoen. The E6 runs about 6 kilometres (3.7 mi) east of the airport, so 6 kilometres (3.7 mi) of Norwegian National Road 35 was widened to a four-lane motorway to connect the E6 to the airport. This connection cost NOK 1 billion. After the opening of the airport, National Road 35 was reconstructed west of the airport as a two-lane toll road. Also Norwegian National Road 120 and Norwegian National Road 174 were reconstructed.

=== Opening and growth ===
Gardermoen has had considerable problems with fog and freezing rain, and has several times had a complete close-down. This was also a problem at Fornebu, and reported to be at Hurum as well. On average, there is super cooled rain three times per month during the winter. The use of deicing fluids is restricted since the area underneath the airport contains the Tandrum Delta, one of the country's largest uncontained quaternary aquifers (underground water systems). On 14 December 1998, a combination of freezing fog and supercooled rain caused glaze at Gardermoen. At least twenty aircraft engines were damaged by ice during take-off, and five aircraft needed to make precautionary landings with only one working engine. On 18 January 2006, an Infratek deicing system was set up, that uses infrared heat in large hangar tents. It was hoped that it could reduce chemical deicers by 90%, but the technique has proved unsuccessful.

In 1999, Northwest Airlines briefly operated a flight between Oslo and Minneapolis/St. Paul, MN, United States, for several months, before the flight was cancelled due to poor load factors. Northwest had previously served the airport in 1987 with nonstop flights operated with McDonnell Douglas DC-10-40 wide body jetliners several days a week to New York - JFK with continuing direct service to Memphis International Airport (MEM) and Minneapolis–Saint Paul International Airport (MSP). In October 2001, the only remaining intercontinental flight, to Newark Airport (EWR), with Scandinavian Airlines (SAS) operated Boeing 767–300 aircraft, was discontinued, due to a slump in air travel following the 9/11 attacks. In 2004, Scandinavian Airlines and Continental Airlines (now United Airlines) resumed service on this route using Airbus A330 and Boeing 757-200 respectively. United Airlines suspended winter service on the route in 2015, then discontinued the service completely in 2017. Scandinavian Airlines also started a direct service from Oslo to Miami in 2016.

Also in 1999, Pakistan International Airlines (PIA) became the first Asian airline to touchdown in Oslo, commencing its first flights to the city to and from Karachi, Lahore and Islamabad. The return flights had a stopover at Copenhagen Airport before continuing onward to Pakistan.

Norwegian Air Shuttle launched flights to Bangkok, New York – JFK, Los Angeles, Fort Lauderdale, Oakland (San Francisco), and Orlando with Boeing 787 Dreamliner jetliners and Dubai, Agadir and Marrakech with Boeing 737-800 jets. Three more airlines began service. Thai Airways launched service to Bangkok, Qatar Airways to Doha, and Emirates to Dubai.

In 2012, the airport opened a new 650-square-meter (7,000 sq ft) VIP terminal exclusively used for the royal family, the prime minister and foreign heads of state and government. According to EUROCONTROL, Gardermoen had the most delays per flight of all airports in Europe in July 2012. As a consequence of the delays, which apparently were caused by a lack of air traffic controllers, several airlines received NOK 100 million in compensation from Avinor.

== Facilities ==
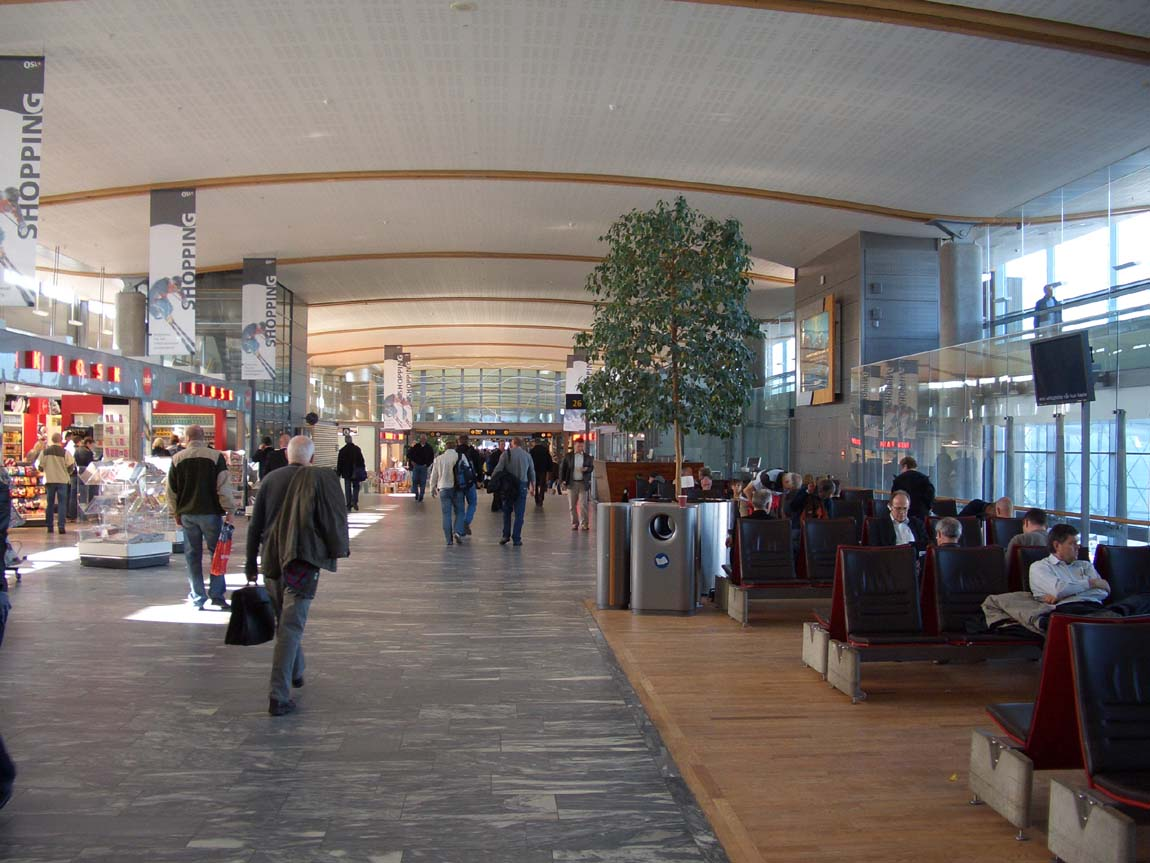
Terminal 1

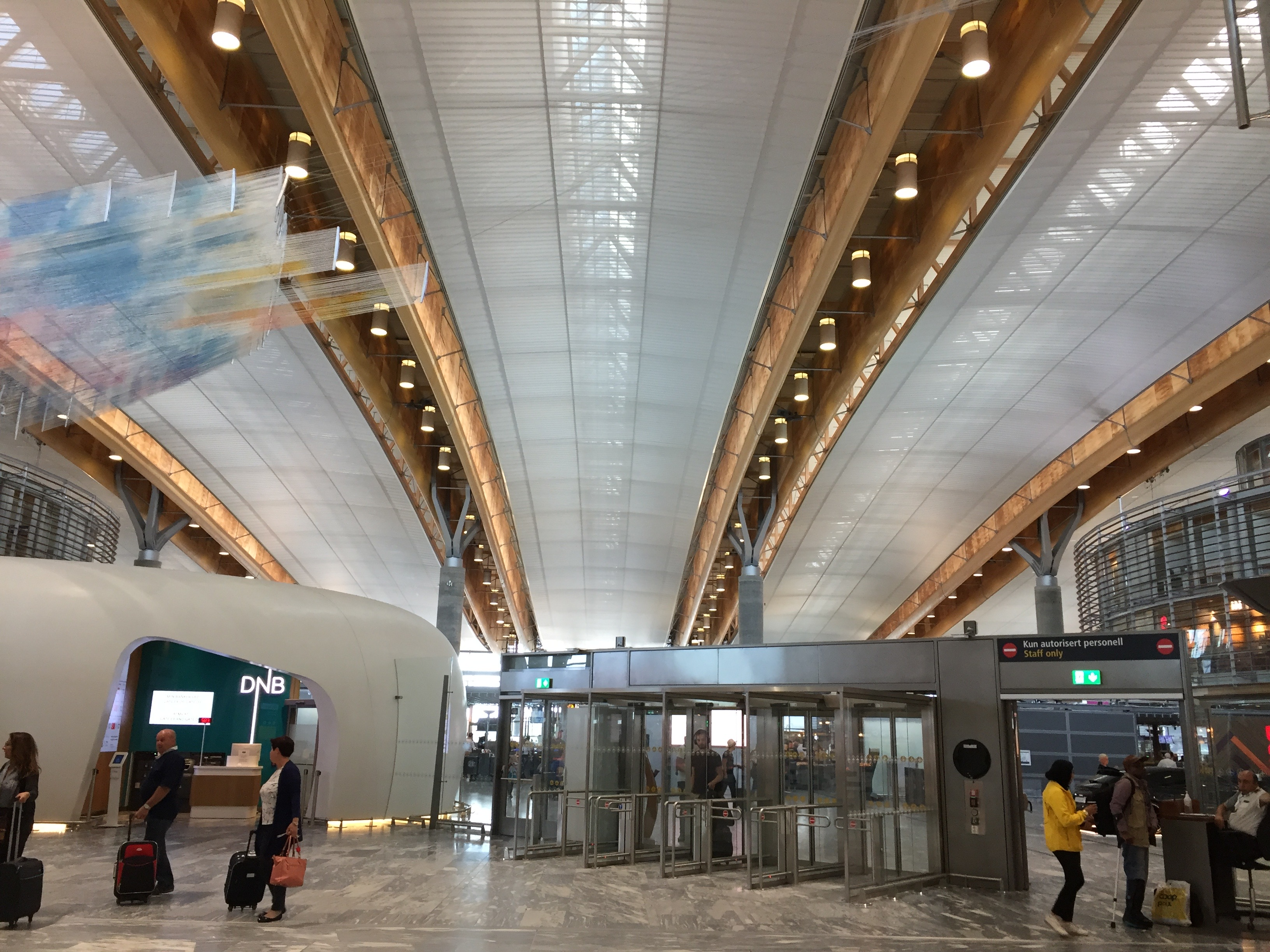
Interior

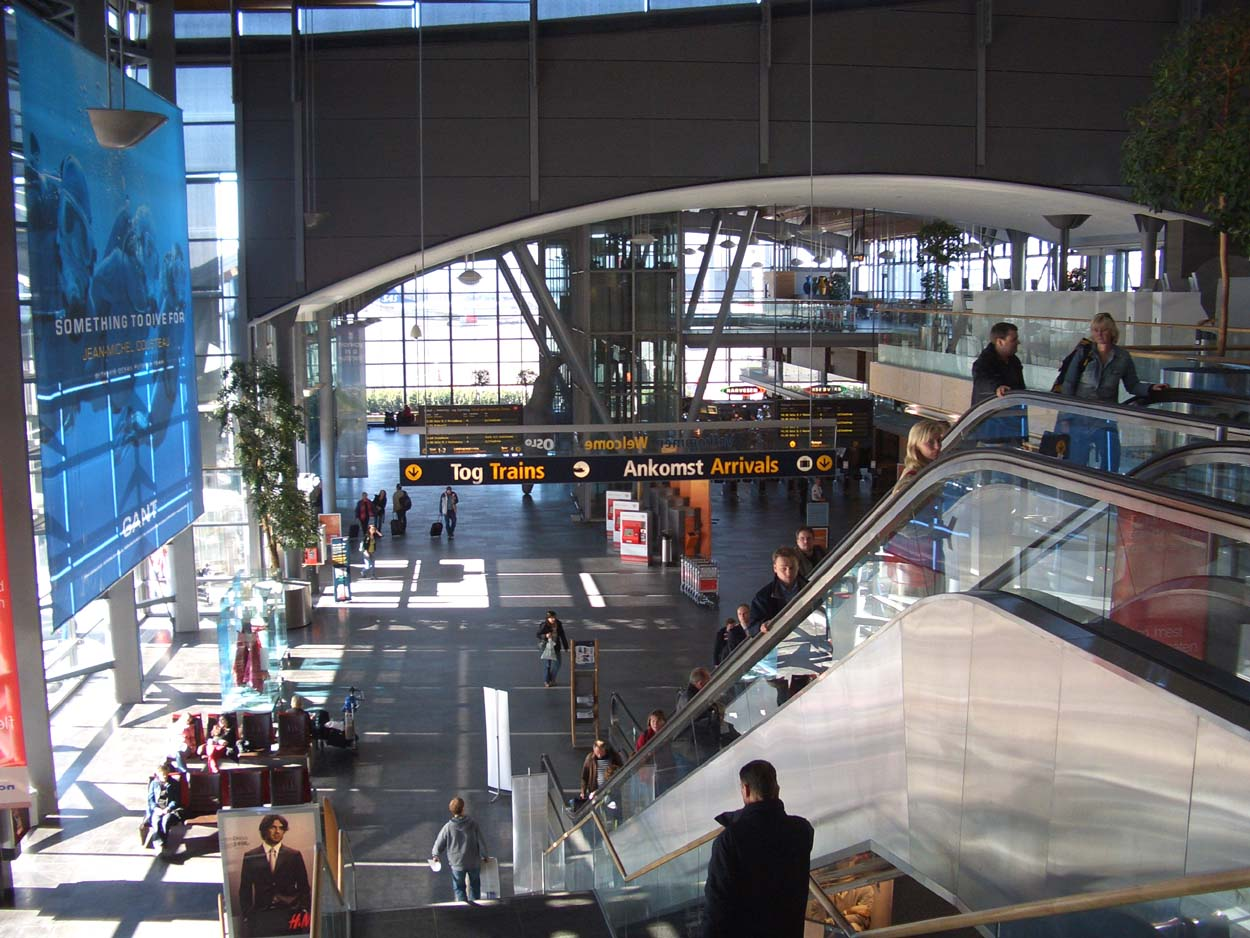
Arrival and train station

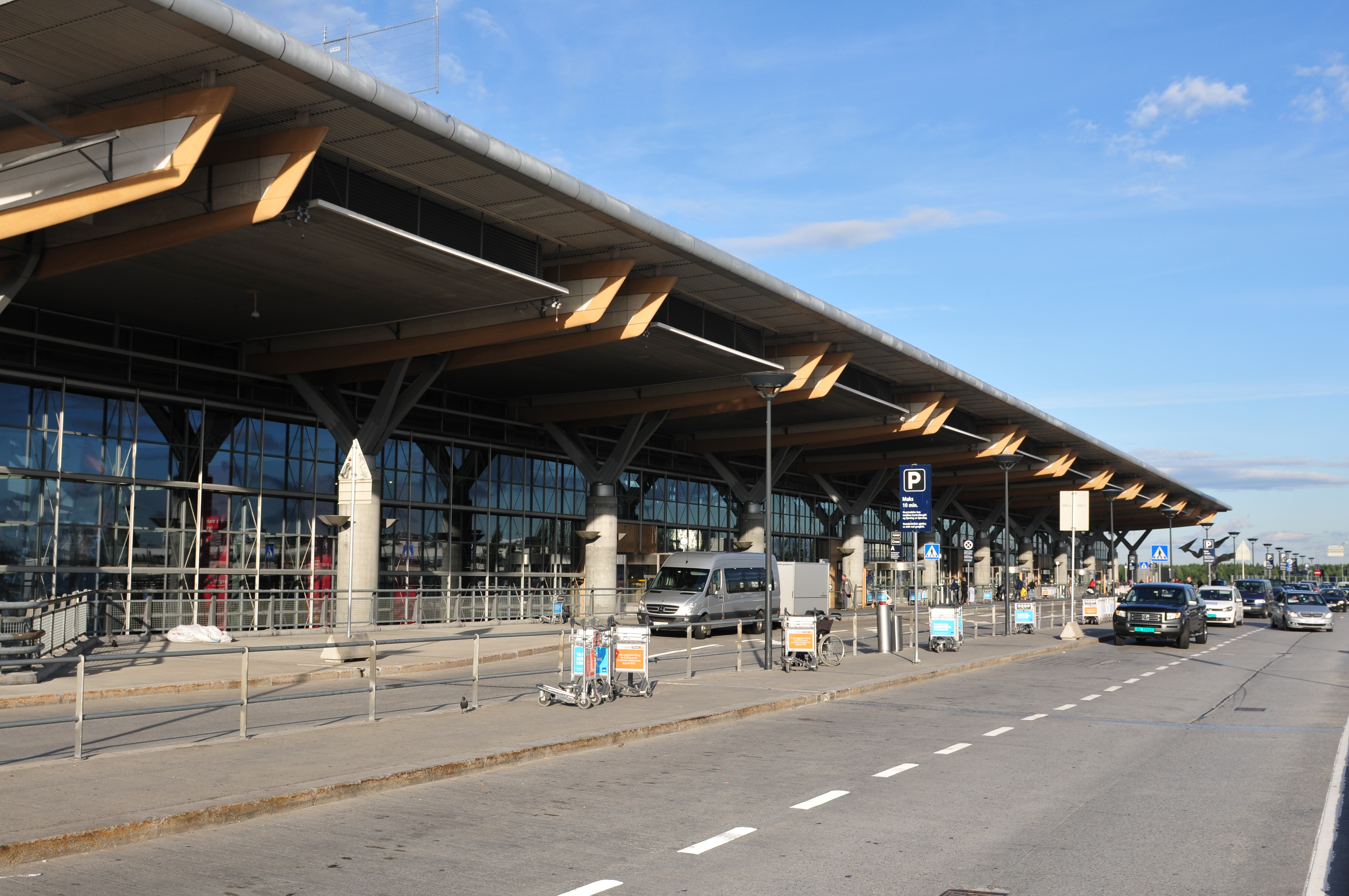
Terminal as seen from outside

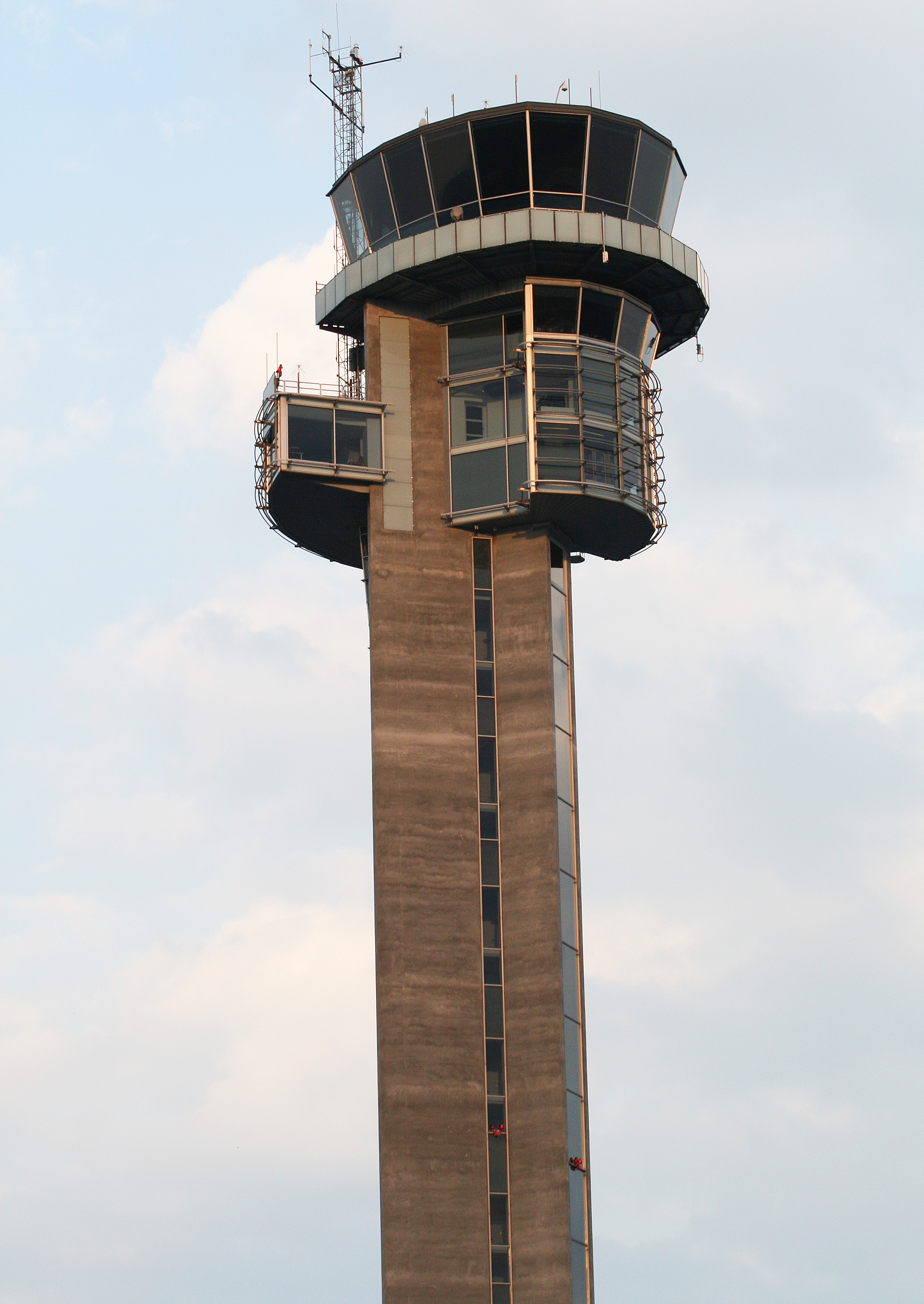
ATC tower

The airport covers an area of 13 square kilometres (5.0 sq mi) and is modeled partially on Hartsfield–Jackson Atlanta International Airport, with two parallel runways and a single terminal with two piers on a single line. Oslo Airport is located 19 nautical miles (35 km; 22 mi) north-northeast of Oslo city centre.

=== Terminal ===
The passenger terminal covers 265,000 square metres (2,850,000 sq ft). The airport has 72 gates, of which 44 are bridge-connected and 28 are remote stands.

The original west wing of the terminal contains the domestic A-gates. The west wing also connects to the south pier that contains the eight B-gates, all of which lack jet bridges. This south pier was constructed in 2012 to compensate for the gates lost while the north pier was being built, and was intended for demolition after five years, but in 2018 a moving walkway to the pier was installed and Avinor expressed its intention to make the pier permanent. In 2024, the airport started using the south pier for early morning international Schengen area flights. When configured for international flights, the gates are numbered G1 to G8 and accessed by shuttle bus from the international area of the terminal.

The north pier, containing 11 gates, was opened in 2017. It was also the first terminal in the world to receive an "excellent" BREEAM rating. This terminal uses recycled snow from the runways to recover energy for heating and cooling. Nine of the gates are configurable as either domestic C-gates or international Schengen area D-gates. The two northernmost gates are international D-gates only. Passengers using the north pier are directed to the top floor for domestic flights or the lower floor for international flights.

The east pier of the original terminal is for international flights. The gates for Schengen area flights are E-gates while the F-gates for the non-Schengen area are at the easternmost end of the terminal. An expansion to the non-Schengen end of the east pier was opened during the summer of 2022. Four gates near the end of the east pier are flexigates where doors can be opened or closed to switch between Schengen and non-Schengen flights. EU controllers have been somewhat skeptical of the Schengen/non-Schengen flexigates, and there were a few incidents where the wrong doors were opened so that passengers who should have gone through the border control did not.

A notable feature of the airport is that it is "silent", so announcements for flights are only made in the immediate vicinity of the gate.

Many international passengers connecting to domestic flights have to pick up their luggage, show it to customs and check in the luggage again. Some transit passengers avoid Oslo Airport and look for other routing options because of this. The process of clearing customs before connecting from an international to a domestic flight is not unique for Oslo Airport, as it is the same process used at international airports in the United States and some other countries. Most passengers whose inbound flight is with SAS, Norwegian or Widerøe and who are connecting on a through ticket can instead use the domestic transfer customs process that avoids this, although certain flight origins are excluded.

About half the airport operator's income is from retail revenue. There are 20 restaurants providing food or drink service, stores and other services including banks and a post office. In all, 8,000 square metres (86,000 sq ft) are used for restaurants, stores and non-aviation services. The departure duty-free shop is 1,530 square metres (16,500 sq ft) and the largest in Europe. The shop is located in front of the international concourse, taking up a large part of the terminal's width. The airport has attempted to funnel all passengers through the duty-free shop. Signs put up to hinder passengers from walking outside the duty-free were removed after criticism in 2008. Arriving passengers have access to a smaller duty-free shop in the baggage claim area.

In addition to the main terminal, the airport operates a VIP lounge for the Norwegian royal family, members of the Norwegian government and members of foreign royal families and governments. The General aviation terminal, located on the west side of the airport, services GA-aircraft, executive jets and ambulance aircraft. The cargo terminal is located just southwest of the main terminal and has seven gates for cargo aircraft.

=== Art and architecture ===
The airport's architects were Aviaplan, a joint venture between the agencies Nordic — Office of Architecture, Niels Torp, Skaarup & Jespersen and Hjellnes Cowi. The main architect was Gudmund Stokke. The terminal building has a light, modern roof that is held up by wooden reefers. The main construction materials are wood, metal and glass. The airlines were required to follow the same design rules for their buildings as the terminal. The new pier is cladded with oak from Scandinavian rainforests, and features low-carbon technologies such as district heating and natural thermal energy to improve sustainability.

The main art on the landside of the airport is Alexis, consisting of six steel sculptures in stainless steel created by Per Inge Bjørlo. On the airside, Carin Wessel used 30,000 metres (98,000 ft) of thread to make the impression of clouds and webs, named Ad Astra. Anna Karin Rynander and Per-Olof Sandberg cooperated in making two installations: The Marathon Dancers, located in the baggage claim area, is a set of two electronic boards that show a dancing person. Sound Refreshment Station, of which six are located in the departure areas, are sound "showers" that make refreshing sounds when a person is immediately under them. Sidsel Westbø etched the glass walls. In the check-in area, there are small boxes under the floor with glass ceilings that contain curiosities. As well as the custom-made art, several existing sculptures and paintings were bought. At the National Road 35 and European Route E6 junction, Vebjørn Sand built a 14-metre (46 ft) statue named the Kepler Star. It consists of two internally illuminated Kepler–Poinsot polyhedrons, appearing like a giant star in the sky after dark.

=== Runways and air traffic control ===
The airport has two parallel runways, aligned 01/19. The west runway 01L/19R is 3,600 by 45 metres (11,811 ft × 148 ft), while the east runway 01R/19L is 2,950 by 45 metres (9,678 ft × 148 ft). The configurations allows 80 air movements per hour. The runways are equipped with CAT IIIA instrument landing system and the airport is supervised by a 91-metre (299 ft) tall control tower. Once departing aircraft are 15 kilometres (9 mi) away from the airport, responsibility is taken over by Oslo Air Traffic Control Center, which supervises the airspace with Haukåsen Radar. The airport has two ground radars, on the far sides of each of the runways. Both at the gates and along the taxiways, there is an automatic system of lights that guide the aircraft. On the tarmac, these are steered by the radar, while they are controlled by motion sensors at the gate.

There are three deicing platforms. Both fire stations each have three fire cars, and is part of the municipal fire department. Meteorological services are operated by the Norwegian Meteorological Institute, which has 12 weather stations and 16 employees at the airport. This includes Norway's first aeronautic information service and a self-briefing room, in addition to briefings from professionals. Restrictions on air movements apply overnight from 23:00 to 06:00, although landing and taking off on the north side is permitted.

=== Air station ===
The Royal Norwegian Air Force has an air base at Gardermoen, located at the north side of the passenger terminal at Oslo Airport. The base dates from 1994 and houses the 335-Squadron that operates three Lockheed C-130 Hercules transport planes. The airbase also handles nearly all military freight going abroad. The Air Force has a compact 41,000 square metres (440,000 sq ft) building space. The station is built so that it can quickly be expanded if necessary, without having to claim areas used by the civilian section. The military also use the civilian terminals for their passenger transport needs, and send 200,000 people with chartered and scheduled flights from the main terminal each year. The station serves as the main entering point for VIPs and officials going to Norway.

== Organisation ==
The airport is owned by Oslo Lufthavn AS, a limited company wholly owned by Avinor, a state-owned company responsible for operating 46 Norwegian airports. In 2010, Oslo Lufthavn had a revenue of NOK 3,693 million, giving an income of NOK 1,124 million before tax. The profit from the airport is largely paid to Avinor, which uses it to cross-subsidise operating deficits from smaller primary and regional airport throughout the country. At the end of 2010, Oslo Lufthavn had 439 employees.

The company has a subsidiary, Oslo Lufthavn Eiendom AS, which is responsible for developing commercial real estate around the airport. It owns one airport hotel run by the Radisson Blu chain, the office building and conference center Flyporten, which along with the hotel features 60 conference rooms, and the employee parking lot. A second hotel, Park Inn, was opened in September 2010.

== Airlines and destinations ==
=== Passenger ===
Until 2020, Gardermoen had a relatively large increase in the number of long-distance routes. This growth was largely driven by Norwegian's investment in longer routes. When the coronavirus pandemic came to Norway in March 2020, Norwegian had to close down its long-haul fleets after a short time, because there was not a sufficient customer base. However, companies such as Qatar Airways and Emirates also contributed to the long-distance increase. In the spring of 2019, Hainan Airlines opened a direct route between Oslo and Beijing. As of 2019, a number of charter flights were also offered from Gardermoen under the auspices of various travel operators, distributed throughout the year. Among these operators were Ving, Apollo and TUI. During the summer months, destinations around the Mediterranean were best represented until 2020 (especially holiday destinations in Spain, Greece and Turkey), while in the winter, direct flights is offered to intercontinental destinations, for example Cuba, Gambia, Canary Islands, Cape Verde, Mexico and Thailand.

Airlines	Destinations
Aegean Airlines	Athens, Rhodes
Aer Lingus	Seasonal: Dublin
Air Cairo	Cairo (begins 21 December 2026), Hurghada (begins 22 December 2026)
Air Canada	Seasonal: Toronto–Pearson (begins 2 June 2027)
Air France	Paris–Charles de Gaulle
Air Serbia	Belgrade
airBaltic	Riga, Tallinn
Atlantic Airways	Vágar
Austrian Airlines	Vienna
British Airways	London–Heathrow
Brussels Airlines	Brussels
Croatia Airlines	Seasonal: Split
DAT	Florø, Røros, Stord, Ørland
Emirates	Dubai–International
Ethiopian Airlines	Addis Ababa
Finnair	Helsinki
Hainan Airlines	Beijing–Capital
Iberia	Madrid
Icelandair	Reykjavik–Keflavík
KLM	Amsterdam
LOT Polish Airlines	Gdańsk, Warsaw–Chopin
Lufthansa	Frankfurt, Munich
Luxair	Luxembourg
Norse Atlantic Airways	Seasonal: Bangkok–Suvarnabhumi, Phuket
Norwegian Air Shuttle	Ålesund, Alicante, Alta, Amsterdam, Antalya, Barcelona, Bardufoss, Belgrade, Bergen, Berlin, Billund, Bodø, Bucharest–Otopeni, Budapest, Copenhagen, Dublin, Düsseldorf, Edinburgh, Faro, Funchal, Gdańsk, Geneva, Gran Canaria, Hamburg, Harstad/Narvik, Haugesund, Helsinki, Kirkenes, Kraków, Kristiansand, Lakselv, Larnaca, London–Gatwick, Longyearbyen, Madrid, Málaga, Manchester, Milan–Malpensa, Molde, Munich, Nice, Palanga, Paris–Charles de Gaulle, Prague, Pristina, Riga, Rome–Fiumicino, Stavanger, Stockholm–Arlanda, Tallinn, Tenerife–South, Tromsø, Trondheim, Vienna, Vilnius, Warsaw–Chopin; Seasonal: Agadir, Ajaccio, Andøya, Athens, Bari, Basel/Mulhouse, Bergamo, Bilbao, Bodrum, Bologna, Bordeaux, Brussels, Burgas, Catania, Chania, Cluj-Napoca, Corfu, Dubai–Al Maktoum, Dubrovnik, Gazipaşa, Heraklion, Hurghada, Ibiza, Istanbul, Kefalonia, Lamezia Terme, Lanzarote, Lisbon, Lyon, Malta, Montpellier, Naples, Olbia, Palermo, Palma de Mallorca, Pisa, Porto, Preveza/Lefkada, Pula, Reykjavík–Keflavík, Rhodes, Salzburg, Santorini, Sarajevo, Seville (begins 20 March 2027), Skopje, Sofia, Split, Tangier, Thessaloniki, Tirana, Tivat, Toulouse, Valencia, Varna, Venice, Verona, Zürich
Pegasus Airlines	Istanbul–Sabiha Gökçen
Qatar Airways	Doha
Ryanair	Katowice, London–Stansted, Vilnius
Scandinavian Airlines	Aalborg, Aarhus, Ålesund, Alicante, Alta, Amsterdam, Barcelona, Bergen, Billund, Bodø, Brussels, Copenhagen, Dublin, Düsseldorf, Gran Canaria, Hamburg, Harstad/Narvik, Haugesund, Kirkenes, Kristiansand, Kristiansund, Larnaca, London–Heathrow, Longyearbyen, Málaga, Manchester, Milan–Malpensa, Newark, Nice, Paris–Charles de Gaulle, Reykjavík–Keflavík, Stavanger, Stockholm–Arlanda, Tromsø, Trondheim, Zürich; Seasonal: Antalya, Athens, Berlin, Catania, Chania, Faro, Florence, Gazipaşa, Geneva, Munich, New York–JFK, Palermo, Palma de Mallorca, Pula, Rhodes, Rome–Fiumicino, Split, Stuttgart, Tenerife–South, Tivat
Sunclass Airlines	Charter: Gran Canaria, Tenerife-South; Seasonal charter: Burgas, Gazipaşa, Kos, Phuket
SunExpress	Seasonal: Izmir
Swiss International Air Lines	Geneva, Zürich
TAP Air Portugal	Lisbon
Thai Airways International	Bangkok–Suvarnabhumi
Transavia	Nantes (begins 30 March 2027), Paris–Orly
TUI Airways	Seasonal: Birmingham (begins 13 December 2026), London–Gatwick, Manchester
Turkish Airlines	Istanbul
Vueling	Barcelona
Widerøe	Bergen, Bodø, Brønnøysund, Førde, Molde, Sandane, Sogndal, Trondheim, Ørsta-Volda; Seasonal: Leknes, Sandnessjøen, Stavanger, Svolvær, Tromsø
Wizz Air	Bratislava, Budapest, Gdańsk, Kraków, Palanga, Rome–Fiumicino, Szczecin, Warsaw–Radom (begins 30 March 2027)

=== Cargo ===
Airlines	Destinations
PopulAir	Trondheim
Beijing Capital Airlines	Chengdu–Tianfu
Challenge Airlines IL	Liège, Tel Aviv
Ethiopian Airlines Cargo	Brussels, Liège, Seoul–Incheon, Hanoi
Hong Kong Air Cargo	Hong Kong
Korean Air Cargo	Seoul–Incheon, Vienna
Martinair	Amsterdam
Qatar Airways Cargo	Doha, Liège
SF Airlines	Ezhou
Silk Way West Airlines	Baku
SprintAir	Bodø, Longyearbyen, Tromsø
Suparna Airlines	Shanghai
Turkish Cargo	Helsinki, Istanbul

== Statistics ==
Oslo Airport has a catchment area of 2.5 million people, including most of Eastern Norway and 0.3 million people in Sweden. In 2017, Oslo Airport served 27,482,315 passengers, 181,265 tonnes (178,402 long tons; 199,810 short tons) of cargo and 242,555 aircraft movements. In 2017, Oslo Airport was ranked the 19th busiest airport in Europe. It is the second-busiest Nordic airport after Copenhagen Airport. The busiest route is to Trondheim, with over 2 million passengers. Along with the domestic routes to Bergen and Stavanger, and the international routes to Copenhagen and Stockholm, Oslo Airport serves five of the 25 busiest routes in the EEA, all with more than one million passengers.

=== Annual traffic ===
Annual passenger traffic
Year	Passengers	% Change
2010	19,091,036	Steady
2011	21,103,623	▲10.5%
2012	22,080,433	▲4.6%
2013	22,956,540	▲4%
2014	24,269,235	▲5.7%
2015	24,678,195	▲1.7%
2016	25,787,691	▲4.5%
2017	27,482,315	▲6.6%
2018	28,516,220	▲3.8%
2019	28,592,619	▲0.3%
2020	9,021,729	▼68.4%
2021	9,398,133	▲4.2%
2022	22,467,510	▲139.1%
2023	25,147,914	▲11.9%
2024	26,440,015	▲5.1%
2025	27,072,860	▲2.4%

=== Busiest domestic routes ===
Top 10 busiest domestic routes from/to Oslo (2021)
Rank	City / country	Airport	Passengers
1	Trondheim	Trondheim	1,005,572
2	Bergen	Bergen	991,026
3	Stavanger	Stavanger	785,475
4	Tromsø	Tromsø	722,576
5	Bodø	Bodø	480,661
6	Harstad	Harstad/Narvik	403,916
7	Ålesund	Ålesund	273,986
8	Haugesund	Haugesund	191,441
9	Kristiansand	Kristiansand	177,735
10	Molde	Molde	134,924

=== Busiest European routes ===
Top 20 busiest European routes from/to Oslo (2023)
Rank (2023)	Change %	Airport	Passengers	Airline(s)
1	Steady	Copenhagen	1,339,246	Norwegian Air Shuttle, Scandinavian Airlines
2	Steady	Stockholm–Arlanda	1,142,662	Ethiopian Airlines, Norwegian Air Shuttle, Scandinavian Airlines
3	Steady	Amsterdam	671,995	KLM, Norwegian Air Shuttle, Scandinavian Airlines
4	Steady	London–Heathrow	649,170	British Airways, Scandinavian Airlines
5	Steady	Paris–Charles de Gaulle	470,512	Air France, easyJet, Norwegian Air Shuttle, Scandinavian Airlines
6	Steady	Frankfurt	443,972	Lufthansa
7	Steady	Alicante	389,785	Norwegian Air Shuttle, Scandinavian Airlines
8	▲1	London–Gatwick	371,642	Norwegian Air Shuttle
9	▲1	Munich	367,367	Lufthansa, Norwegian Air Shuttle, Scandinavian Airlines
10	▲1	Helsinki	321,564	Finnair, Norwegian Air Shuttle, Scandinavian Airlines
11	▼3	Málaga	318,762	Norwegian Air Shuttle, Scandinavian Airlines
12	Steady	Gran Canaria	291,159	airBaltic, Norwegian Air Shuttle, Scandinavian Airlines
13	▲2	Kraków	281,881	Norwegian Air Shuttle, Wizz Air
14	▼1	Barcelona	262,301	Norwegian Air Shuttle, Scandinavian Airlines, Vueling
15	▼1	Berlin	256,337	Norwegian Air Shuttle, Scandinavian Airlines
16	Steady	Reykjavík–Keflavík	248,725	Icelandair, Norwegian Air Shuttle, Scandinavian Airlines
17	Steady	Brussels	241,886	Brussels Airlines, Scandinavian Airlines
18	▲2	Riga	225,109	airBaltic, Norwegian Air Shuttle
19	Steady	Zürich	223,295	Scandinavian Airlines, Swiss International Air Lines
20	▼2	Gdańsk	214,724	Norwegian Air Shuttle, Wizz Air

10 busiest intercontinental routes to and from Gardermoen (2017)
Rank	City / country	Airport(s)	Passengers	Change 2016–2017
1	New York	New York–JFK; Newark	281,000	▼8.5%
2	Bangkok	Suvarnabhumi	243,000	▲2.5%
3	Dubai	Dubai–International	193,000	▲16.4%
4	Doha	Doha	136,000	▼8.4%
5	Los Angeles	Los Angeles	58,000	▲17.5%
6	Miami	Miami	56,000	▲154.3%
7	Fort Lauderdale	Fort Lauderdale	55,000	▲2.2%
8	Boston	Boston	35,000	▲22.9%
9	Oakland	Oakland/San Francisco	34,000	▼1.3%
10	Orlando	Orlando–MCO	29,000	▲1.0%

== Ground transportation ==
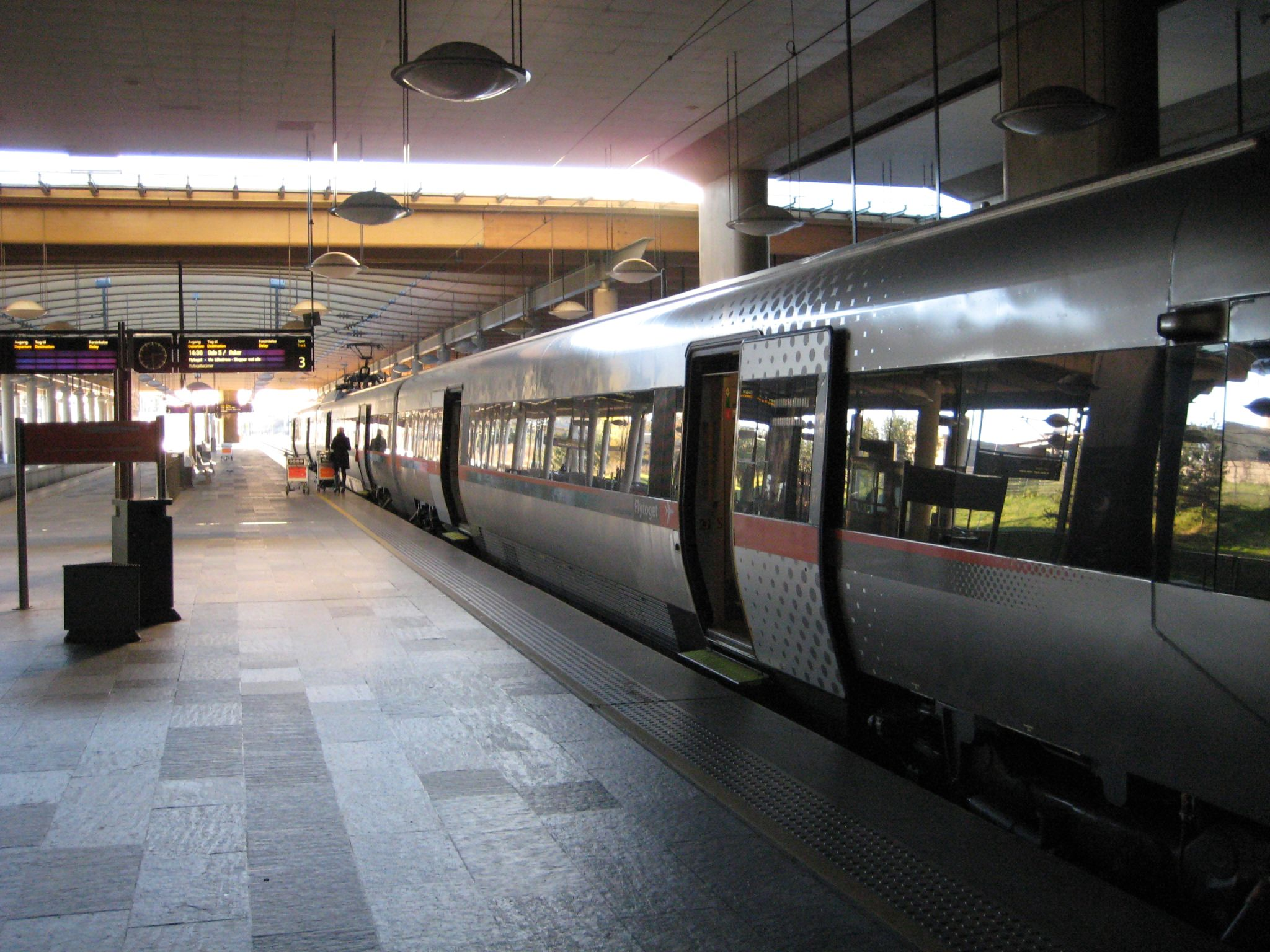
Class 71 Airport Express Train at Oslo Airport Station

Situated about 47 kilometres (29 mi) from the city center, Oslo Airport offers extensive public transport services. The airport has one of the world's highest levels of public transport usage, with a share of nearly 70%.

The 64 kilometres (40 mi) Gardermoen Line opened the same day as the airport, and runs in a tunnel below the airport facilities, where Gardermoen Station is located. The Flytoget airport express train operates to Oslo Central Station six times per hour in 19 to 22 minutes, with three services continuing onwards via five intermediate stations to Drammen Station. On Saturdays and Sundays, the trains run three times an hour. The Airport Express Train has a 34% ground transport share.

Vy also operates from the airport, both a commuter train service to Eidsvoll and Kongsberg, and a regional service north to Innlandet and south to Vestfold og Telemark. Both offer services to Oslo, and the latter allows direct service to Sandefjord Airport, Torp. Five daily express trains operated by SJ Norge to Trondheim stop at the airport, including one night train.

The Oslo Airport Express Coach serves the airport, from Oslo, Fredrikstad, Sarpsborg, Ski and Gjøvik. In addition, most express buses from other parts of Norway stop at the airport. The local transport authority, Ruter, operates a number of services to Oslo Airport from nearby places.

The airport is located 2 kilometres (1.2 mi) from European Route E16, and 6 kilometres (3.7 mi) from the European Route E6 and connect to them as a four-lane motorway. The E6 runs south with four lanes to Oslo, and northwards with four lanes towards Oppland, Hedmark and Central Norway. E16 connects with two lanes westward towards Buskerud and eastward towards Sweden. All these directions are toll roads, at least in part. There are 11,400 parking spaces at the airport, as well as taxi stands and rental car facilities.

Taxi

There are several companies providing services at Oslo Airport. In order to check companies, rates and book a taxi, the passenger must go to the information desk at the arrivals hall of the airport.

== Plans ==
Oslo Airport has experienced rapid increases in passenger numbers during the last decade, already exceeding its original capacity limit of 17 million passengers. As a result, the Norwegian Air Transport Authority, Avinor, approved plans on 19 January 2011, for an expansion of OSL with Terminal 2 (North Pier). Finished in Spring 2017, the expansion involved construction of a new pier located directly after security checkpoint with eleven new air bridges, six remote stands, a new arrivals and departure hall, and a new baggage handling system. The expansion doubled the size of the terminal from 148,000 square meters to 265,000 square meters. OSL can now handle 32 million passengers annually, which was 19 million before the expansion. Yet, before the North Pier was finished, OSL invested further plans to expand the international terminal with six new wide-body airliner gates for more direct flights to destinations outside of Europe. The expansion began in 2017 and was finished in 2022. Once the intercontinental expansion is finished, the airport will be able to accommodate the double-decker Airbus A380. This fixed the major issue where Norwegians were traveling to larger hub airport Europe in order to reach their final destination, because OSL (both the market and airport's size) was to handle a global flight network, so many passengers had to use connecting flights. Another phase will be added later on to bring the total capacity to 35 million passengers annually through the T2-project. If passenger traffic continues to grow and if the capacity will be surpassed beyond the capabilities, OSL and Avinor will call out for a master phase (as situated in the Master Plan 2012–2050), including extension of the North Pier by another 100 meters, adding a third runway with a free-standing pier between it and the existing Eastern runway, as well as a new terminal to the southeast area of the current international terminal (by where Park Inn is located).

The Government of Oslo has debated if a third runway in the future will be reliable. If they approve, the runway will not be finished until 2030 at the earliest. Avinor has discovered the existing runway capacity will be saturated by 2030, but critics have pointed out that larger hubs such as Heathrow in London only operate with two runways. However, such airports tend to suffer from major delays and have chaotic schedules. Oslo had 253,542 movements against 474,087 at Heathrow in 2017. Former Minister of Transport, Liv Signe Navarsete (Center), has stated that spreading the traffic between the two airports (RYG is closed on permanent basis) will result in inconvenience for passengers and a massive need for inter-airport ground transportation, but has announced she is opposed to a third runway. Avinor is facing large costs of extending short runways in rural locations or replacing such airports during the 2020s decade, so a third runway at Oslo is less prioritized. However, as of December 2017, construction of a nearby city directly to the east of OSL has been officially approved, nicknamed "the Gate to Europe", in which a third runway and a third terminal are part of the project.

Norwegian CEO Bjørn Kjos has announced that the airline has ambitions to evolve Gardermoen into a major global hub between North America and South Asia. Kjos stated; "We could have received tons of traffic from all around the world. Oslo could have been one of the largest hubs in Europe, and could have competed against the large ones in the Middle East" (DXB and DOH). He guarantees the transatlantic routes will be significantly shorter via Northern Europe, which will lead to increased efficiency and satisfaction for the travelers and for the economy. Norwegian is currently disallowed to fly direct over Russian territory by their Air Traffic Authorities, meaning that negotiation is the only solution.

== Accidents and incidents ==
- On 28 December 2024, KLM Flight 1204, a Boeing 737-800 sustained damage to its landing gear during takeoff from Oslo, and made an emergency landing at nearby Sandefjord Airport. All 182 occupants were uninjured, and were kept on board until stairs for disembarking were in place. As of July 2025, the incident is under investigation by the Norwegian Safety Investigation Authority.

== Climate ==
Climate data for Gardermoen 1991–2020 (202 m)
Month	Jan	Feb	Mar	Apr	May	Jun	Jul	Aug	Sep	Oct	Nov	Dec	Year
Mean daily maximum °C (°F)	−1.6 (29.1)	−0.8 (30.6)	3.9 (39.0)	9.6 (49.3)	15.5 (59.9)	19.3 (66.7)	21.5 (70.7)	20.3 (68.5)	15.3 (59.5)	8.3 (46.9)	2.9 (37.2)	−0.7 (30.7)	9.5 (49.0)
Daily mean °C (°F)	−4.4 (24.1)	−4.1 (24.6)	−0.5 (31.1)	4.6 (40.3)	10.1 (50.2)	14.1 (57.4)	16.5 (61.7)	15.1 (59.2)	10.6 (51.1)	5 (41)	0.5 (32.9)	−3.4 (25.9)	5.3 (41.6)
Mean daily minimum °C (°F)	−7.3 (18.9)	−7.6 (18.3)	−4.3 (24.3)	0.1 (32.2)	4.8 (40.6)	9.2 (48.6)	11.7 (53.1)	10.7 (51.3)	6.8 (44.2)	2.1 (35.8)	−1.9 (28.6)	−6.3 (20.7)	1.5 (34.7)
Average precipitation mm (inches)	65.2 (2.57)	46.7 (1.84)	45.5 (1.79)	49.8 (1.96)	67.3 (2.65)	78.4 (3.09)	80.9 (3.19)	101.4 (3.99)	80.5 (3.17)	94.4 (3.72)	89.5 (3.52)	67 (2.6)	866.6 (34.09)
Average precipitation days (≥ 1.0 mm)	12	8	7	8	10	10	10	11	9	11	12	11	119
Source: National Oceanic and Atmospheric Administration

== See also ==
- Oslo-Rygge Airport
- Oslo-Torp Airport
- Gardermoen Police Station (Oslo Airport)
- List of airports in Norway
- Kjeller Airport
