= Haukåsen Radar =

Air traffic control radar in Oslo, Norway

Coordinates: 59°54′14″N 10°53′48″E

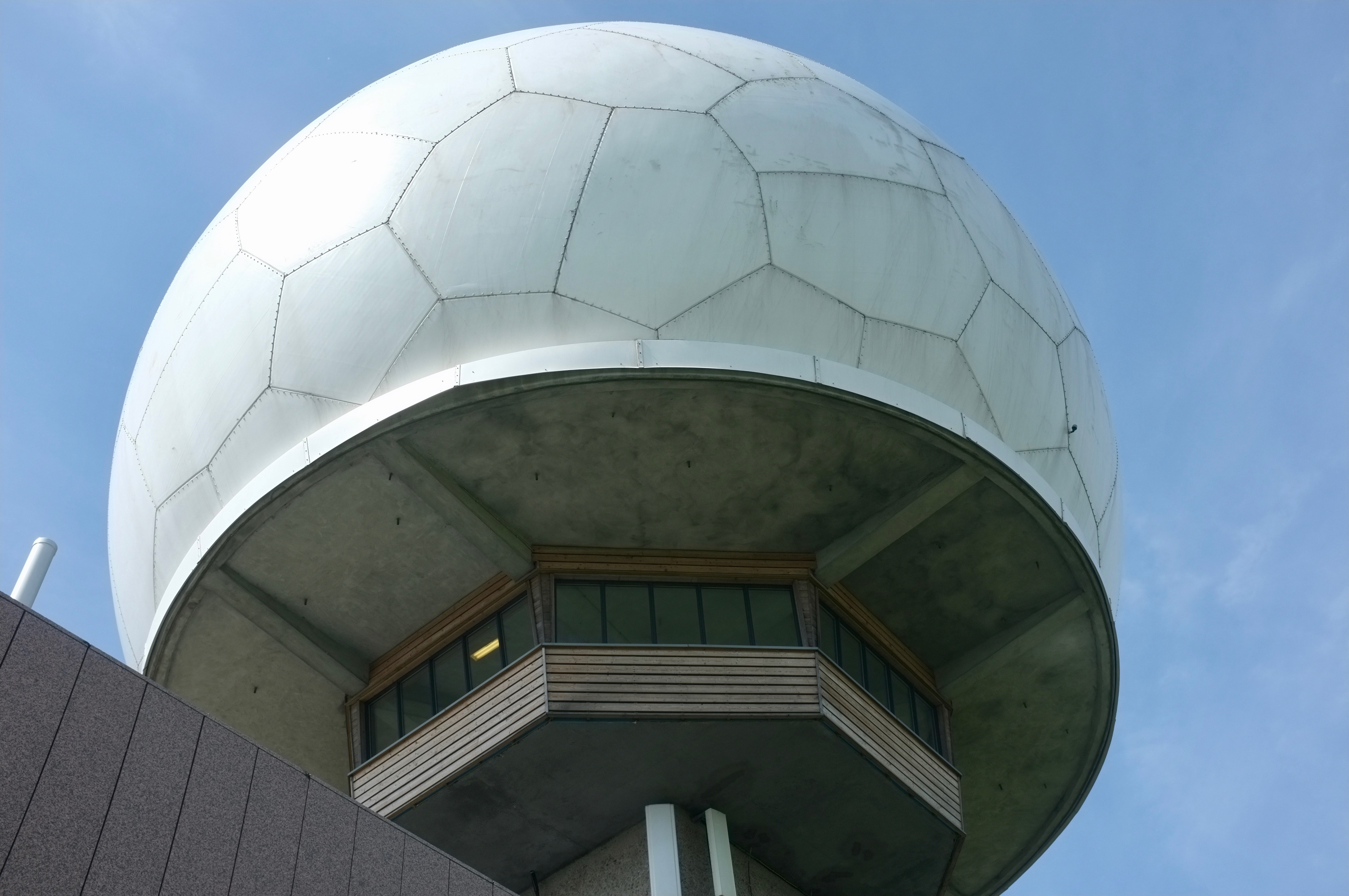
Haukåsen Radar (May 2018)

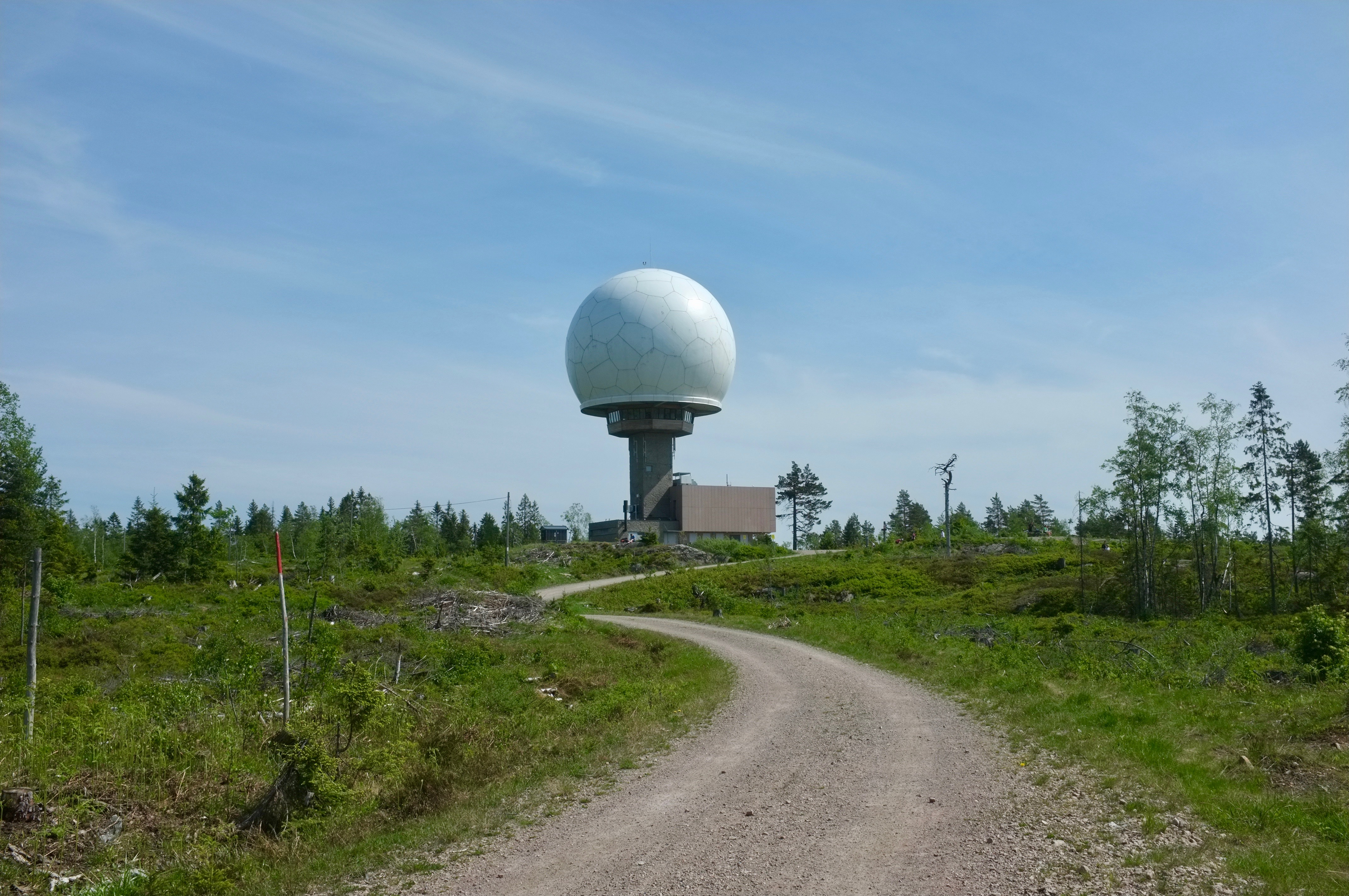
Haukåsen Radar with surroundings.

Haukåsen Radar is one of two air traffic control radars serving Oslo's Gardermoen Airport, the other being the airport radar itself. The radar is a landmark structure visible from most of Oslo and its surroundings, located inside a white radome on the hillcrest Haukåsen in Østmarka, elevation 357 meters above sea level, south-east of the suburb of Haugerud in the Grorud Valley. The first radar to be built here in 1964, is exhibited at the National Aviation Museum in Bodø in Northern Norway. The radar is unmanned and remotely operated by Oslo ATCC (the Area Control Center at Røyken south of Oslo) and is owned by Avinor. The radar itself, rotating at a cycle of about 4 seconds, can be peeked through a grate when standing directly below the dome. The radiation from the antenna is reported by geocachers to render GPS equipment in its vicinity inoperable.
