= Stavanger Air Traffic Control Center =

Coordinates: 58°53′13″N 5°37′50″E

Western Norway

Stavanger Air Traffic Control Center or Stavanger ATCC (Norwegian: Stavanger kontrollsentral) is responsible for the controlled airspace above Western Norway. The area control center is located at Stavanger Airport, Sola. The Control Center is owned and operated by the state enterprise Avinor. In 2006, Avinor's board had projected the closure of Oslo ATCC in 2012, transferring its responsibilities to Stavanger ATCC. However, this decision was revoked, and the air traffic distribution among ATCCs remains unchanged.
