= Oslo Air Traffic Control Center =

Coordinates: 59°44′12″N 10°22′15″E

Oslo Air Traffic Control Center or Oslo ATCC (Norwegian: Oslo Kontrollsentral) is responsible for the controlled airspace above Eastern Norway. The area control center is located in Røyken, between Oslo and Drammen. The Control Center is owned and operated by Avinor Flysikring, a subsidiary of the state enterprise Avinor. Avinor's board had originally decided to close Oslo ATCC in 2008, transferring its responsibilities to Stavanger ATCC and a planned new terminal control center at Oslo Airport, Gardermoen. However, new management first postponed the actual closing, by redefining Oslo ATCC as an approach control with surrounding feeder sectors. In 2013 Avinor decided to create Norway ACC, consisting of the centres in Bodø, Stavanger and Røyken, billed as one ATC unit with three separate locations.

Oslo ATCC is served by, amongst others, Haukåsen radar, Vardåsen radar, the airport radar at Oslo Airport, Gardermoen, the new Torp radar and Evje radar. Several other radar feeds are available from radars along the west coast of Norway, and central Norway.

The operation consists of one regular office building above ground. The control center itself where the air traffic controllers work is located in a large subterranean mountain hall built to cold war specifications. The hall has several work stations that each can control one or more air traffic control sectors.
