= Norwegian National Road 226 =

Road in Norway

Coordinates: 59°50′04″N 11°08′52″E

National Road 120
- Bokmål: Riksvei 120; Nynorsk: Riksveg 120

Route information
- Length: 3.9 km (2.4 mi)

Location
- Country: Norway

Highway system
- Roads in Norway; National Roads; County Roads

Riksvei 226 (Rv226) runs between Skedsmovollen and Mosesvingen, Lillestrøm. Formerly known as Rv120, the road number was changed to 226 in 2019.

Prior to 1 January 2010 the road ran between Hurdal and Moss, see fylkesvei 120.
