= Flytoget =

Express train from Oslo to Oslo Airport, Gardermoen

Flytoget AS
- Type: State owned
- Industry: Rail transport
- Founded: 24 November 1992
- Founder: Norges Statsbaner
- Headquarters: Oslo, Norway
- Area served: Greater Oslo
- Key people: Philipp Engedal (CEO); Endre Skjørestad (Chair)
- Products: Airport rail link
- Revenue: NOK 1,019.1 million (2024)
- Operating income: ▲NOK 65.1 million (2024)
- Net income: ▲NOK 34.6 million (2024)
- Number of employees: 343 (end of 2024)
- Parent: Vygruppen AS
- Website: flytoget.no

Previous logo

Flytoget (English: The Airport Express Train) is an airport railway service connecting Oslo Airport to Oslo Central Station. Run by Flytoget AS (formerly NSB Gardermobanen AS), it operates on the Gardermoen Line using sixteen GMB Class 71 electric trains. Normal service frequency is once every ten minutes, with five of the services each hour continuing westwards beyond Oslo Central. The journey takes nineteen minutes, with extended services serving nine stops within Greater Oslo and taking up to 60 minutes.

Flytoget transported 5.4 million passengers in 2007, a 34-percent market share of airport ground transport. The service, which has a top speed of 210 kilometres per hour (130 mph), is the only high-speed rail service in Norway. Construction started in 1994 and high-speed trains began serving Gardermoen Airport from the date of its opening on 8 October 1998, although full operation using the 14.5-kilometre-long (9.0 mi) Romerike Tunnel had to wait another ten and a half months after severe leaks caused by the tunnel's construction led to the partial depletion of two lakes.

Formed in 1992 as a subsidiary of Norwegian State Railways, the company has been owned since 2001 by the Norwegian Ministry of Trade and Industry.

== History ==
=== Decision for a new airport connection ===
When the Parliament of Norway on 8 October 1992 decided to build a new central airport for Eastern Norway, they also decided that the main mode of ground transport should be by rail. While the previous airport, Oslo Airport, Fornebu, was located just outside the city limits, the new airport, Oslo Airport, Gardermoen, would be located 50 kilometres (31 mi) north of the city, outside the reach of existing public transport. The principle of the airport construction was that it was not to be footed by the tax payers; the entire airport would be built with borrowed money through Oslo Lufthavn AS, a subsidiary of the Norwegian Airport Administration. The same principle was chosen for the airport rail link—the Norwegian State Railways (NSB) creating the limited company subsidiary NSB Gardermobanen AS, founded on 24 November 1992, to perform the construction of the line. It would be able to charge train operators using the line, channeling the payments to cover down payments and interest of the debt used to build the railway. Profit margin was estimated to 7.5%.

=== Construction ===
Oslo Airport, Gardermoen, is not on the Trunk Line that runs north from Oslo. With heavy traffic and many small stops until Lillestrøm, and continuing north as single track, the Trunk Line would have to be supplemented by a parallel double track from Oslo, with a new route north of Kløfta to Eidsvoll, the 16 kilometres (10 mi) north of the airport allowing trains operating on the Dovre Line to Lillehammer and Trondheim to access the airport. The 64-kilometre (40 mi) line was named the Gardermo Line.

The Gardermo Line was the second attempt to build high-speed rail in Norway, after the 35-kilometre (22 mi) line from Ski to Moss on the Østfold Line. But no operation speeds exceeding 160 kilometres per hour (99 mph) are achieved there due to short distances and limitations to rolling stock, making Gardermobanen the first real high-speed railway line in Norway. Due to the domination of single track in Norway, the opening of the Gardermo Line increased the total length of double track in the kingdom by two-thirds.

Construction started in 1994. An agreement for purchase of sixteen three-car electric multiple units was signed with Adtranz on 23 February 1995. Parliament decided on 1 October 1996 that the construction company would also operate the new train service. The trains were delivered between 19 September 1997 and 30 January 1998, costing NOK 1.4 billion.

=== Challenges ===
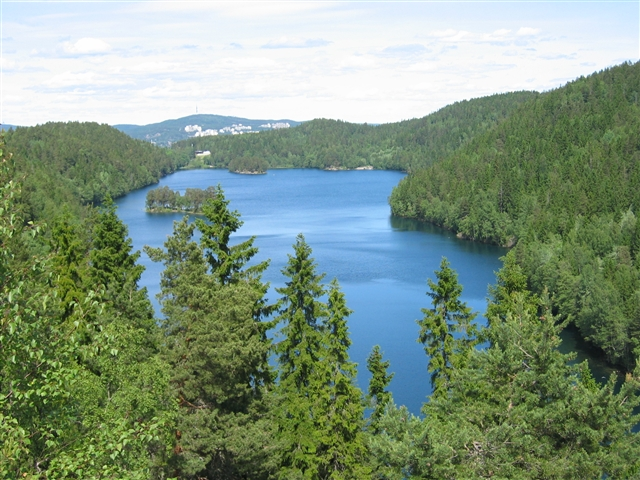
Lake Lutvann was partially drained due to construction problems during the digging of the Romerike Tunnel

The greatest challenge was the need to build the 14,580-metre (47,830 ft) Romerike railway tunnel – Norway's longest – beneath the geologically highly unstable Østmarka area between Etterstad, close to Oslo Central Station, and Lillestrøm. During construction, in 1997, the water level in some lakes above the tunnel, including Lutvann and Nordre Puttjern, sank dramatically. After the leaks were discovered on 3 February 1997, sanctions were imposed by the Norwegian Water Resources and Energy Directorate requiring the elimination of all leakages. At its worst, the tunnel was leaking 3,000 litres (660 imp gal) of water per minute.

Rhoca-Gil sealant was used in an attempt to fix the leaks, but failed to work properly. Not only did it not polymerise, and therefore failed to staunch the leaks, but it also poisoned its surroundings with acrylamide. Manual fixing with concrete became necessary; the fixing and cleaning up of the toxin delayed the building of the tunnel by one year. Further complications arose due to conflicts between NSB Gardermobanen and the construction company, Scandinavian Rock Group, with the latter at one instance stopping work for three weeks while the parties quarrelled in court.

Reports have shown a lack of inspection and reporting procedures during incidents that should have been addressed – but were never taken seriously – in 1995. Construction of the tunnel caused damage to around sixty houses and an evaluation by the Ministry of Transport and Communications showed that NOK 500 million was spent on fixing the leaks and claimed that this was to a large extent an unnecessary expenditure which more efficient engineering procedures would have avoided. The report also criticised the administrative planning and organisation of the overall construction of the railway.

Airport Express Trains began operating as soon as the new airport (and the Lillestrøm to Gardermoen stretch of the new high-speed line) opened on 8 October 1998; however, for more than ten months they had to use the old Hovedbane (Trunk Line) between Oslo S and Lillestrøm, which restricted their frequency to just two trains per hour. Regular operations at full capacity, using the Romerike Tunnel, did not commence until 22 August 1999.

=== Reorganisation ===
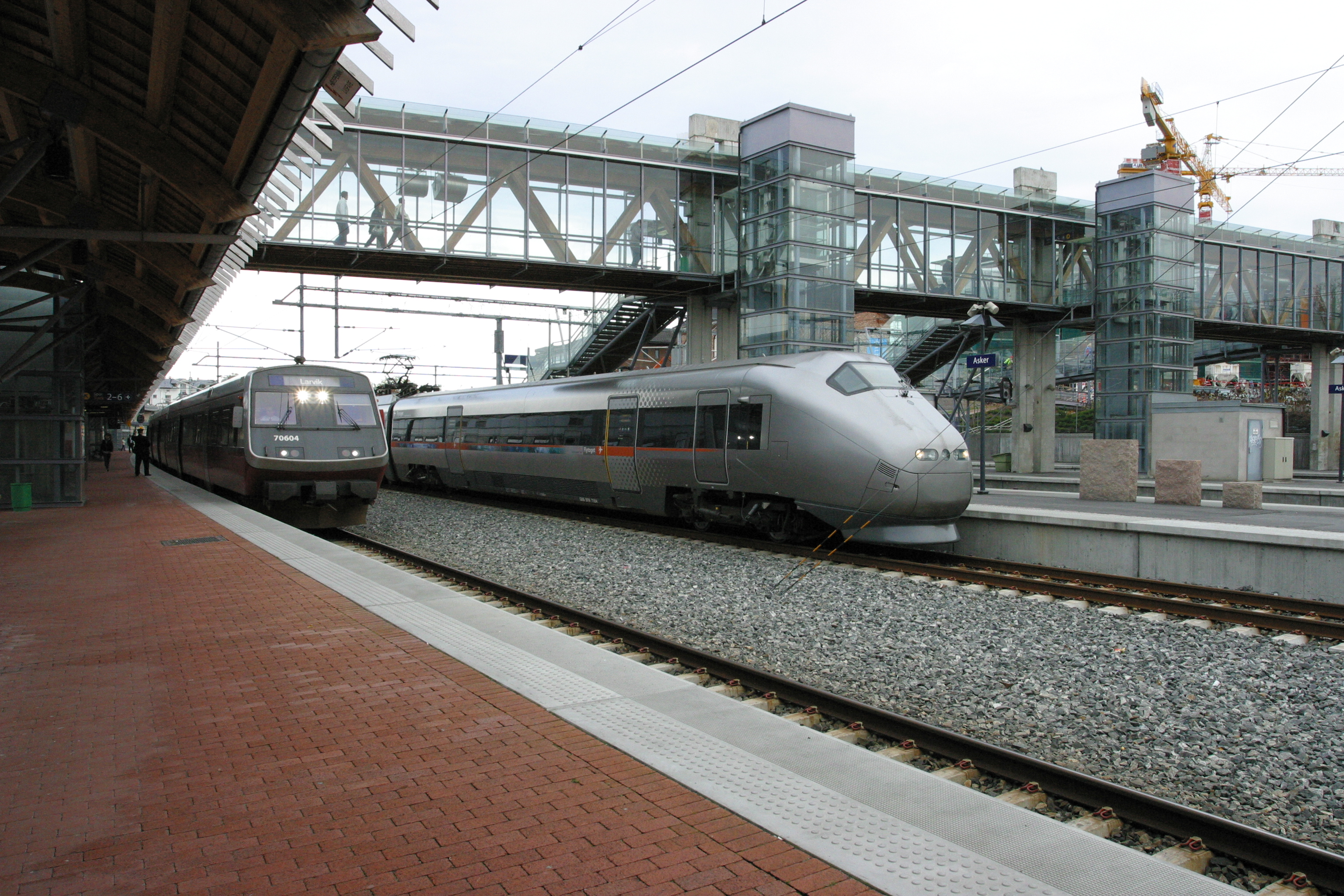
A Class 71 unit beside a Class 70 unit at Asker Station

Estimates for the project costs were NOK 4.3 billion, ±20%, but by completion they had ended at NOK 7.7 billion, of which NOK 1.3 billion were related to the leakages. The rest of the line had a cost exceedings of NOK 0.4 billion. The company had acquired financial costs of NOK 0.9 billion, so the company owed NOK 10.0 billion by 1999, including money spent on the new trains.

The first steps of organisational restructure were taken 29 June 2000, when the CEO of NSB, Osmund Ueland, was fired due to several incidents related to the operations of NSB—not just the Gardermo Line. Einar Enger took over as new CEO on 26 February 2001.

The debt in NSB Gardermobanen had become unmanageable, and in April 2000 parliament accepted that it would not be possible to make the Gardermo Line—with the current structure—the profitable venture predicted in 1992. From 1 January 2001, the company changed name to Flytoget AS, retaining ownership of the trains and operations and kept as a subsidiary of NSB. The tracks and infrastructure were transferred to the Norwegian National Rail Administration (Jernbaneverket), who owns the rest of the Norwegian railway network. All debt was restored and covered by the state, and a vehicle excise duty was implemented on the Gardermo Line to cover the management and maintenance of the line, to be paid by all users.

On 9 December 2002, parliament decided that Flytoget AS would become a separate railway company from 1 January 2003, owned directly by the Ministry of Transport and Communications. One year later the ownership was transferred to the Ministry of Trade and Industry as part of a cleanup of political overhaul between the departments. As part of the process, a new CEO, Thomas Havnegjerde, was appointed in June 2002, and in January 2003 the new chair, Endre Skjørestad—who took over the position form NSB's director Einar Enger. Havnegjerde announced on 6 August 2008 that he would retire from his job before the end of the year. He was replaced by Linda Bernander Silseth on 10 November 2008. On 30 August 2009, two of three services to Asker were extended to Drammen. This followed upgrades to the Drammen Line, including the Lieråsen Tunnel, and a new parking lot at Drammen Station, in total costing NOK 20 million.

=== Discontinuation ===
In February 2026, the Norwegian government announced that Flytoget services would cease in December 2027, the offer being integrated into the regional train network.

== Operations ==
Departures operate every ten minutes from Oslo Central Station (Oslo S) to the airport - i.e. six trains per hour. Half of the trains originate in Drammen, making five intermediate stops before Oslo S, and again at Lillestrøm. One starts from Oslo S and goes directly to Gardermoen without intermediate stops. Two start from Stabekk with stops at Lysaker, Skøyen, Nationaltheateret and Oslo S. On Saturdays, Sunday mornings and during most of July, Flytoget does not operate the direct trains from Oslo S or Stabekk — only the 20-minute headway all-stop trains. While the services northeast from Oslo S to the airport use the high-speed Gardermo Line, those westwards towards Asker use the Drammen Line built in 1870–72 and the Asker Line; so while the 48 kilometres (30 mi) from Oslo S to the airport can be done in 19 minutes, the 24 kilometres (15 mi) from Asker to Oslo S takes 26 minutes. The latter does however include stops at five stations: Nationaltheatret, Skøyen, Lysaker, Sandvika and Asker.

Service	From	To	Trains pr. hour
FLY1	Drammen	Oslo Airport, Gardermoen	3
FLY2	Stabekk/Oslo S	Oslo Airport, Gardermoen	3

Competition is offered from other means of ground transport and by Vy who operate trains from and to the airport. This includes one hourly departure with line R12 of the Oslo Commuter Rail north to Eidsvoll and south to Oslo, Drammen and Kongsberg; two regional trains (line RE10 and RE11) hourly north to Eidsvoll and Lillehammer and south to Drammen and Vestfold; and five daily express trains to Dombås and Trondheim calling Oslo Airport Station, including one night train (although the express trains to Trondheim do not accept passengers only travelling between Oslo and Gardermoen).

The price of a ticket to Oslo is NOK 230, though higher if departing from Sandvika, Asker and Drammen. Reduced fares with 50% discount are offered to senior citizens, children, youth under 21 years, students, benefit recipients and military personnel. Flytoget tickets are not valid on Vy trains, and vice versa. Vy tickets are generally cheaper, though not for some groups with reduced fare; for instance students are granted a greater discount with Flytoget than with Vy. Ticket can either be bought at vending machines or as e-tickets; there is no seat reservation.

Flytoget transported 5.4 million passengers in 2007, a 34% market share of airport ground transport. Flytoget boasts a high service quality, with 96% of departures arriving within 3 minutes of schedule and only 0.4% of departures canceled. Part of this is due to the airport express trains receiving priority over other trains in the limited capacity around Oslo. Flytoget was announced to have the most satisfied, and the fourth most loyal customers of all Norwegian companies in 2008, by the customer satisfaction survey conducted by the Norwegian School of Management. The same year Flytoget was declared the best place of work in Norway by Great Place to Work. During the 2007 recruitment half of the newly educated train drivers chose Flytoget over Vy, mostly due to higher wages.

=== Stations ===
Station	Distance	Time	Fare	Reduced fare
Oslo Airport	0.00 km	0 min	n/a	n/a
Lillestrøm	30.90 km	12 min	NOK 140	NOK 70
Oslo Central Station	48.07 km	19 / 22 min	NOK 180	NOK 90
Nationaltheatret	49.50 km	27 min	NOK 180	NOK 90
Skøyen	52.43 km	32 min	NOK 180	NOK 90
Lysaker	55.07 km	34 min	NOK 180	NOK 90
Stabekk	57.06 km	32 min	NOK 180	NOK 90
Sandvika	62.24 km	42 min	NOK 210	NOK 105
Asker	71.93 km	48 min	NOK 210	NOK 105
Drammen	100.96 km	60 min	NOK 260	NOK 130

=== Incidents ===
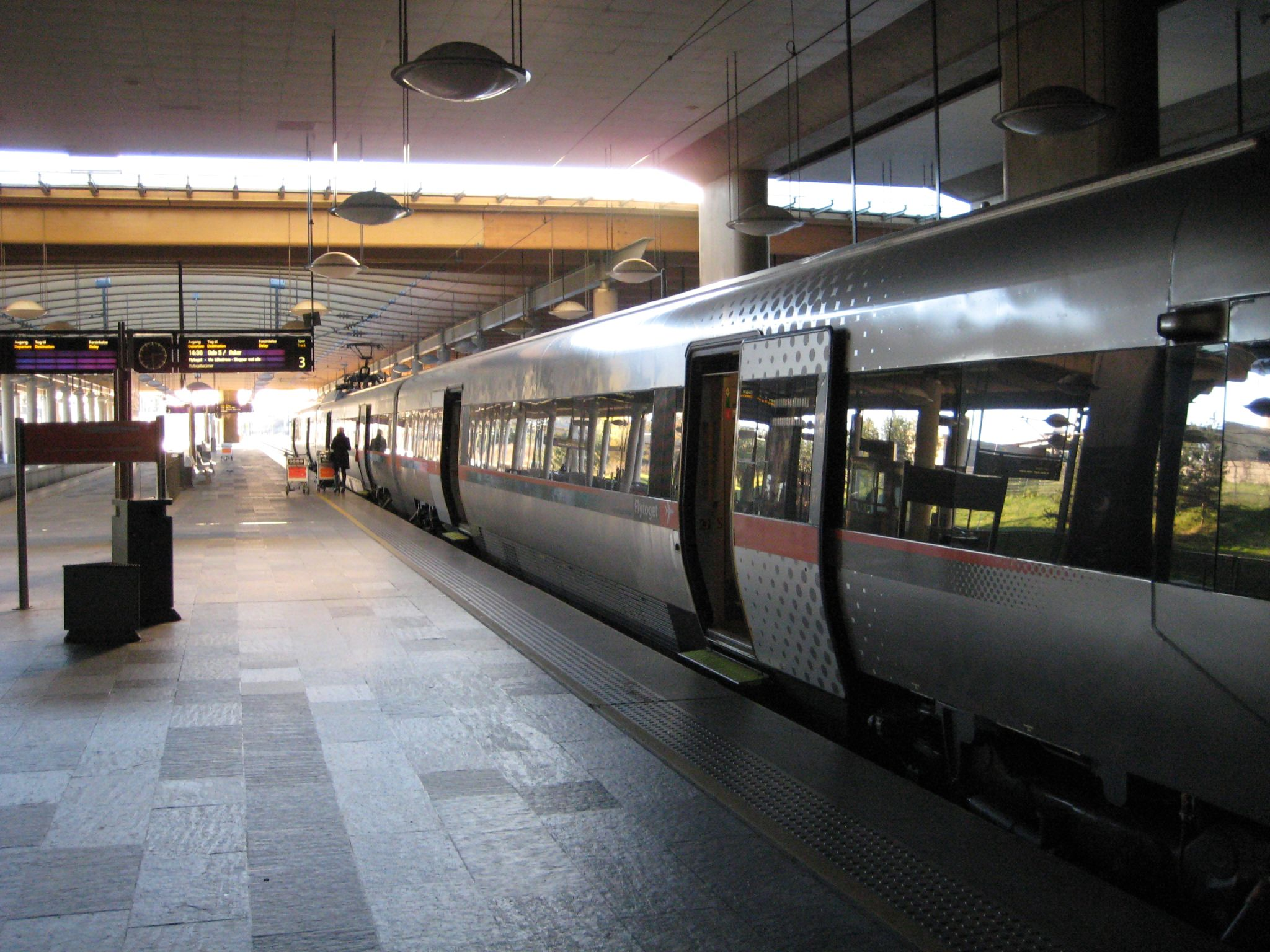
Train awaiting departure from Oslo Airport Station

Several deaths have taken place on the route, but only one due to an accident. In 1999, an employee of the National Rail Administration was killed by a train because it was operating at 160 kilometres per hour (99 mph) instead of the temporarily reduced limit of 80 kilometres per hour (50 mph); Flytoget was fined for not informing the engineer of the speed limit reduction. Several other deaths on the line have been classified as suicides, and so are not in the accident statistics; they do however cause delays on all services for hours after the incident takes place.

In 2000–01, Flytoget experienced three derailments with empty trains at Gardermoen; one caused by the engineer falling asleep and two by the train passing a red light. No more such accidents occurred after automatic Train Control was installed in 2001.

Delays have been experienced many times by travelers due to technical problems on the infrastructure. In particular the old line west of Oslo causes much delay, and the National Rail Administration performed during 2008 a NOK 100 million upgrade to the Oslo Tunnel to ensure better performance. But problems also incur on the new sections, regularly delaying service or capacity, and forcing Flytoget to operate fewer departures. In total 96% of departures arrived within 3 minutes of schedule and 0.4% of departures were canceled in 2007.

Pickpocketing has been a problem since the start; even the Chief of Police in Oslo has been robbed on the train. The train has also been the target of sabotage, and embezzlement for NOK 1 million by an employed ticket salesman, who found a way to print two tickets with the system only charging for one, by turning off and on the ticket printer.

When Al Gore came to Oslo to receive his Nobel Peace Prize on 7 December 2007, he used the Airport Express Train to make his journey as environmentally friendly as possible. The company has initiated a program to ensure better diet for the employees; this had made several lose weight and has reduced the level of sick leave from 12 to 8%. In 2005–07, a program to reduce the energy use of the trains through smarter operation reduced energy consumption by 15%.

During the 2010 volcano air travel disruption, the Gardermoen airport was closed for a period, and the Flytoget trains were used by NSB instead, to give extra train capacity for long-distance routes.

== Rolling stock ==
=== Class 71 ===
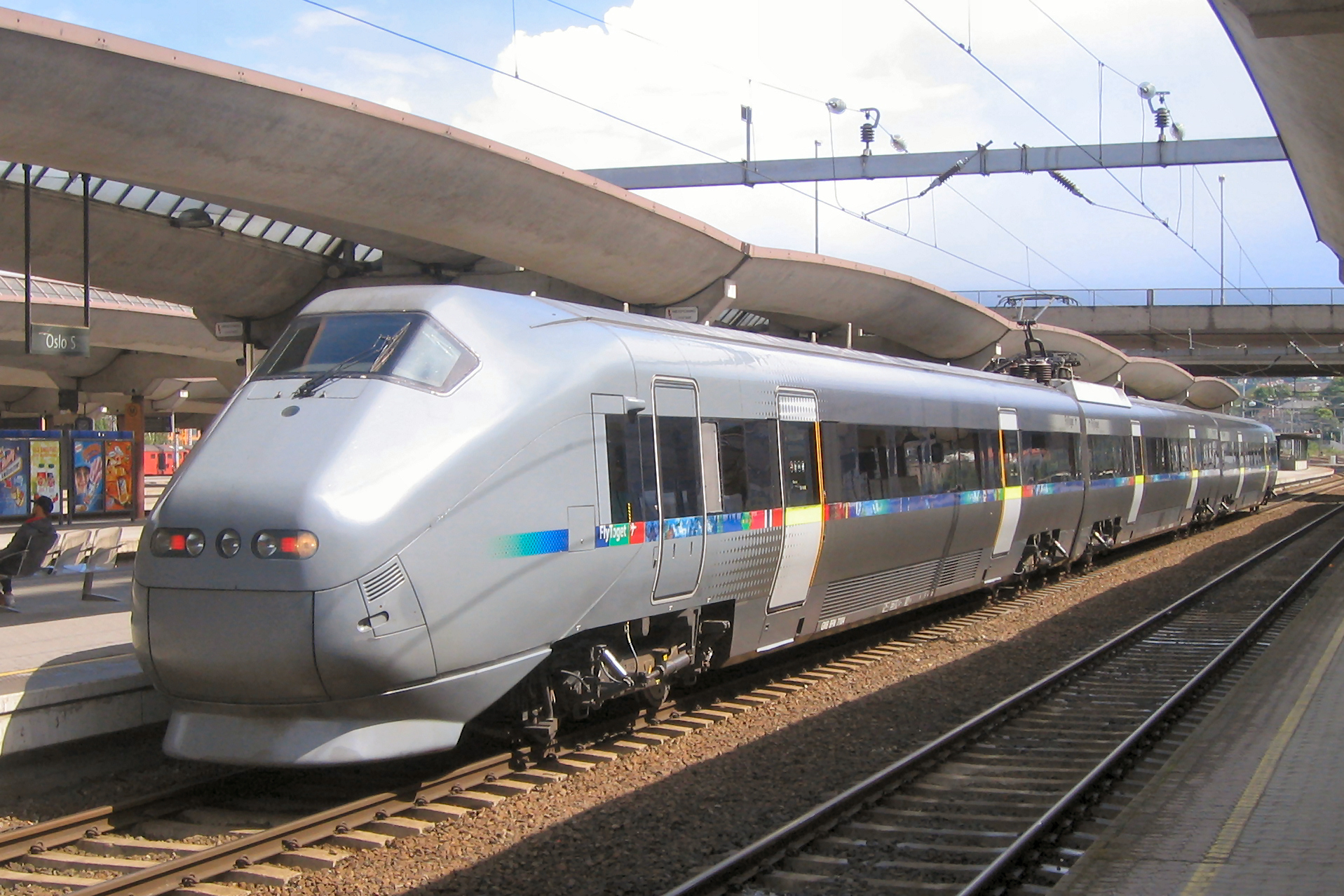
A Class 71 Airport Express Train ready for departure from Oslo S

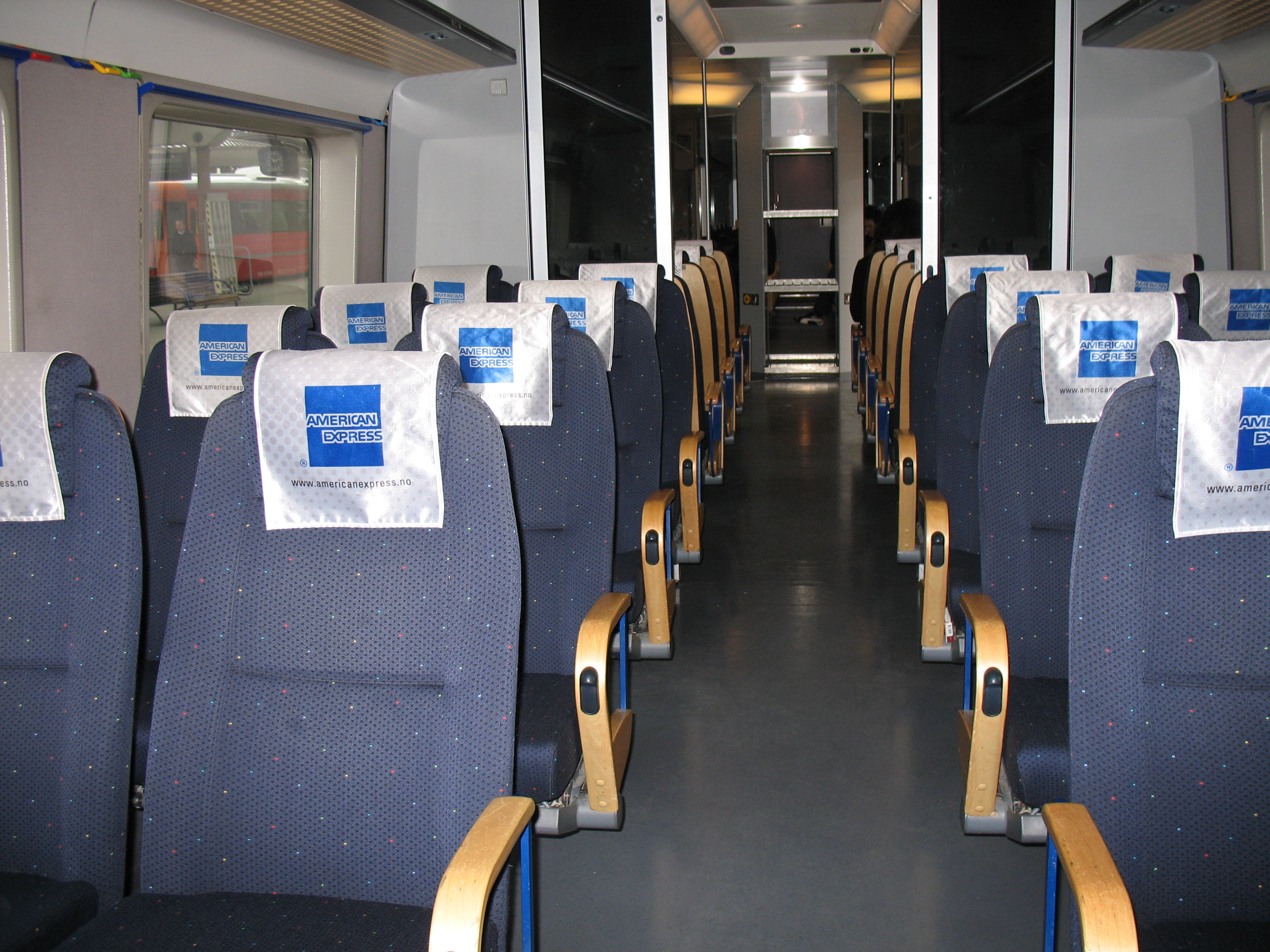
Interior of the Class 71 Airport Express Train

The company operates sixteen Class 71 three-car electric multiple units delivered in 1997–98, and built domestically by Adtranz at Strømmen based on carbodies built in Adtranz factory in Kalmar. They are based on the Swedish X2 operated by SJ in their X 2000 intercity service, and developed by Kalmar Verkstad during the 1980s. The Class 71 are nearly identical to the NSB Class 73, save the 71-series lacking one car and tilting mechanism, and a different interior. Both have chosen to not use the original locomotive design, instead installing one powered bogie in each car. The 71-series is built for a maximum operating speed of 210 kilometres per hour (130 mph), but has achieved higher speeds in test runs.

Among the features are pressure-tight cabins to allow comfortable travel through tunnels at high speeds, and step-free access to the cars. Instead, steps are inside the trains; this has been criticized to be in non-conformance with public accessibility policy. The multiple units can only operate in fixed sets of three cars, but up to three sets can be run in multiple. Flytoget regularly uses double sets to create six-car trains. In 2008–09, all units will be refit with an additional middle car by Bombardier Transportation, increasing capacity by 40% to 244 seats.

Unlike the Class 71, the sister trains in service with NSB were prone to trouble, having to operate on hundred-year-old infrastructure on cross-mountain services; the Class 71 has more lenient operating conditions thanks to better infrastructure. The only incident to ground all the BM71 trains occurred on the 17 June 2000 at Nelaug when a Class 73 train operated by NSB derailed because of stress on the axle. Unlike the NSB trains, the airport express trains were back in service the next day, while the 73-series had to wait another month. On 24 January 2004 a unit had to be taken out of service due to smoke from a stressed bearing—within days the bearings were replaced on all units.

=== Class 78 ===
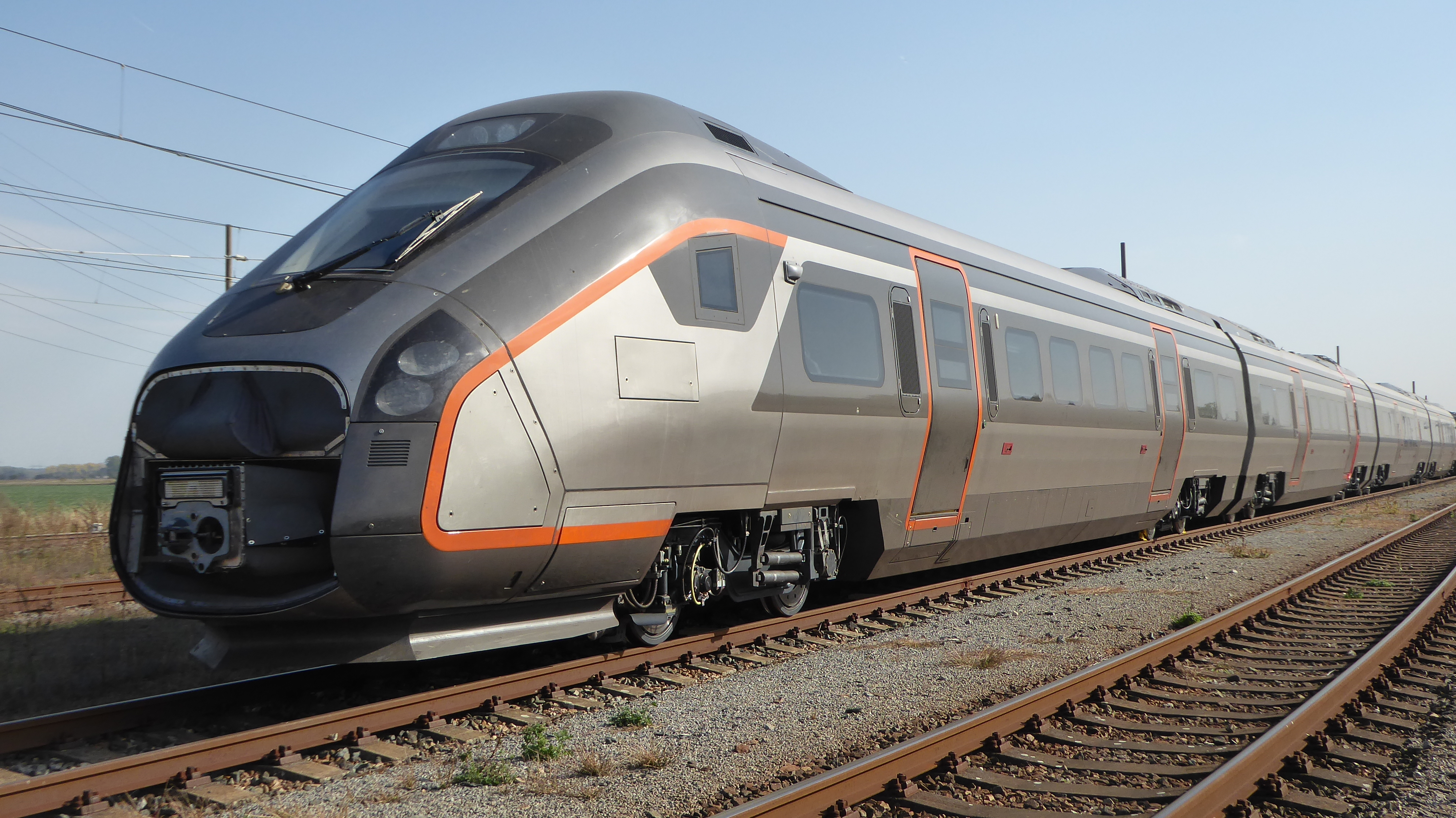
Class 78 train at the Velim railway test circuit

Flytoget purchased eight new 4-car CAF Oaris EMUs from the Spanish manufacturer CAF. They started operation in June 2021. Even though the EMU's maximum speed is 245 kilometres per hour (152 mph), the infrastructure limits the speed to 210 kilometres per hour (130 mph). The trainsets delivered to Flytoget were withdrawn from service after 19 days of operation due to discovery of cracks in the chassis. In January 2023, the trainsets resumed operation.
