= Lindeberg, Oslo =

Area in the borough Alna in Oslo, Norway

Coordinates: 59.93°N 10.87°E

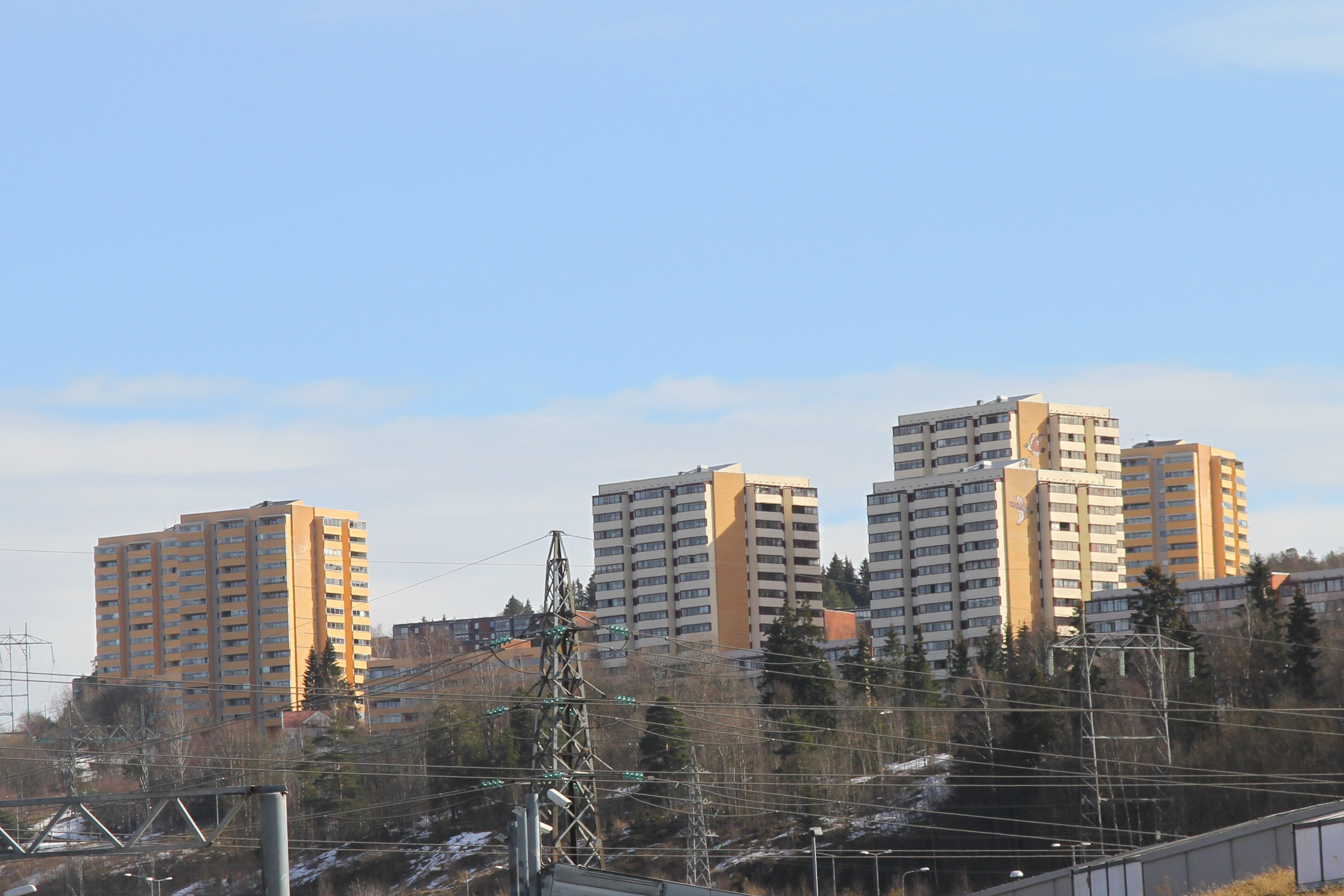
Lindeberg seen from Alnabru

Lindeberg is an area in Oslo, located in Groruddalen southwest of Furuset. The habitation in the area is a mixture of apartment buildings and townhouses. Lindeberg is divided into several housing cooperatives, including Ospa, Furua, Bjørka, Asken, Heggen, Pilen (all USBL) and Lindebergskogen, Søndre Lindeberg and Østre Lindeberg- Kløfterhagen (all OBOS). And Lutvannkollen housing cooperative.

Lindeberg is located close to Østmarka and gives the residents close contact with forests and fields, and walking distance to Lutvann. In 2017 Lindebergparken was completed, with a hiking trail, training area and play and ballroom.

Lindeberg has its own centre, the Lindeberg Centre. The nearby centre is characterized by a polar bear sculpture that has stood there for many years. The centre includes a grocery store (Kiwi), pharmacy, hair salon, Turkish kitchen (restaurant), body care salon, health centre, medical centre and dental offices. In 2011/2012, a café (Kunst, Kaffe og Innramming) was established at the centre square. This was replaced by offices for the Lindeberg area lift through the Groruddals initiative in 2013, called "Lindeberglokalet". Lindeberg is now in permanent operation and is operated by the Alna district in cooperation with the Waste Management and Recycling Authority. Lindeberglokalet is a mini-recycling station, a lending facility for volunteering, and an important meeting place for the locals.

There are three schools at Lindeberg, Skjønnhaug Elementary School, Lindeberg School, One Elementary and Middle School and Jericho Elementary School, as well as several kindergartens. The local youth club is located on a hilltop towards Skjønnhaug school. At Lindeberg there is a corps called Lindebergskolenes Musikkorps. There are also school choirs such as : Skjønnhaug and Lutvann pikekor, Lindeberg skolekor and Jeriko school choir. At Lindeberg there is a sports club called Lindeberg sports club. There is also an association called Lindeberg culture friends, such as blah. is doing theatre, street dance, cultural evenings and the Lindeberg Cultural Festival.
