= Karen Cudrio =

Norwegian businessperson

Karen Cudrio (1716-1797) was a Norwegian businessperson. She was a major wood merchant trader in Østmarka, having inherited the trade as a widow in 1765. She was a well known historical figure and became the subject of legends and local folklore.
