= Romerike Tunnel =

Norwegian railway tunnel

Coordinates: 59°54′20.25″N 10°47′40.00″E

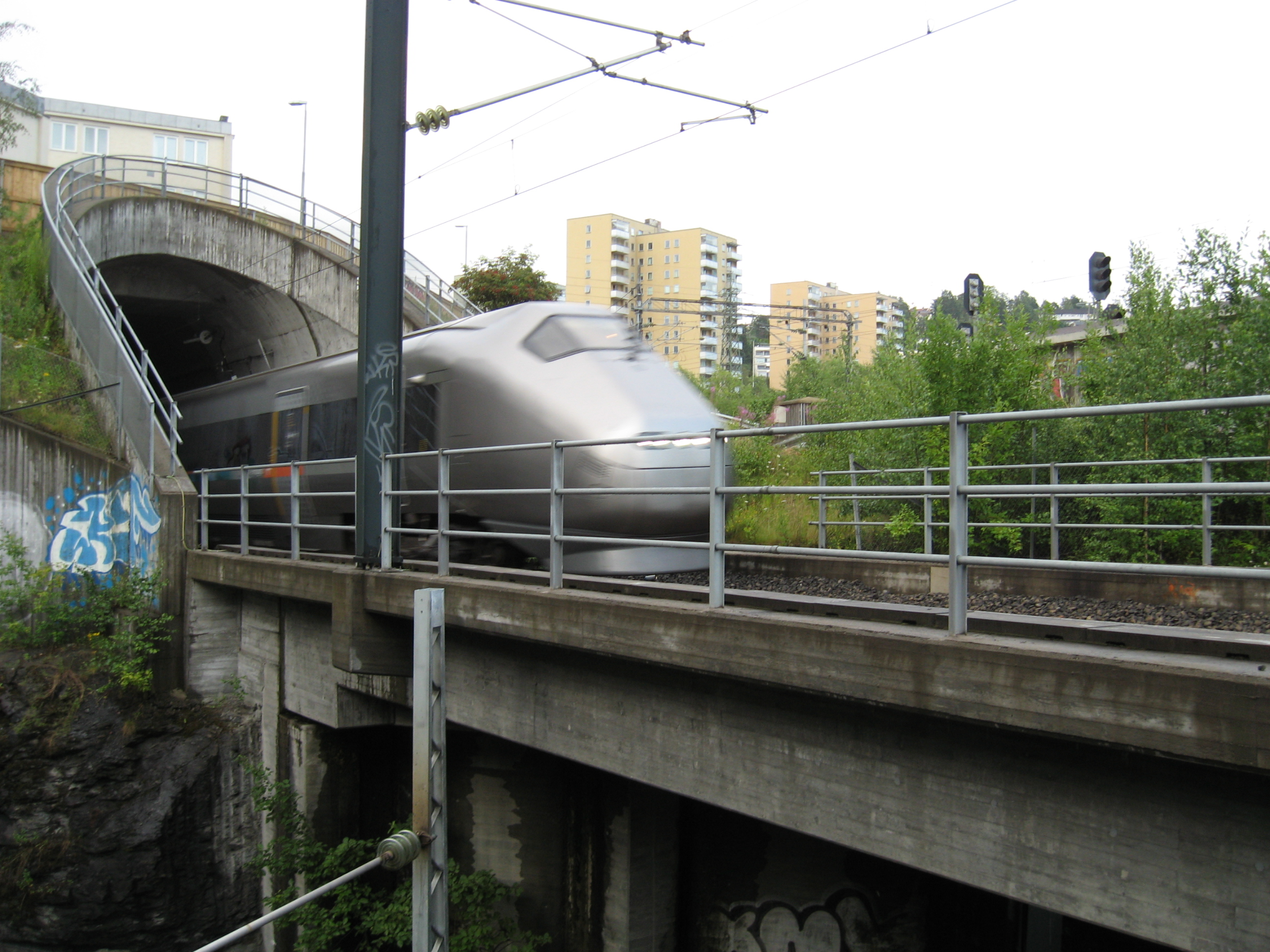
- Flytoget Airport Express Train at Etterstad
- Interactive map of Romerike Tunnel

Overview
- Line: Gardermoen Line
- Location: Østmarka, Norway
- System: Norwegian railways
- Start: Etterstad
- End: Lillestrøm

Operation
- Opened: 22 August 1999
- Owner: Bane NOR
- Operator: Flytoget; SJ; SJ Norge; Vy; Vy Tåg

Technical
- Line length: 14.580 km (9.060 mi)
- No. of tracks: Double
- Track gauge: 1,435 mm (4 ft 8 1/2 in)
- Electrified: 15 kV 16.7 Hz AC
- Operating speed: 210 km/h (130 mph)

The Romerike Tunnel (Norwegian: Romeriksporten) is a 14.580-kilometre (9.060 mi) railway tunnel in Norway between Oslo and Lillestrøm. It is the second longest railway tunnel in Norway after the Blix Tunnel opened in 2022, and forms the first section of the Gardermoen Line. It is double track and electrified, permitting speeds of 210 kilometres per hour (130 mph).

Construction started in 1994, with plans to open with the rest of the Gardermoen Line and Oslo Airport, Gardermoen on 8 October 1998. Due to serious leakage from Lutvann and several other lakes, it did not open until 22 August 1999. The leaks increased the cost of the tunnel from 0.5 billion kr to NOK 1.8 billion. The main contractor was Scandinavian Rock Group. The tunnel was originally owned by NSB Gardermobanen, then the Norwegian National Rail Administration, and now owned by Bane NOR. The tunnel allows long-distance, regional and Flytoget Airport Express Trains to bypass the old Hoved Line, reducing journey times between Oslo and Lillestrøm from 16-18 minutes down to 10 minutes.

== Background ==
The tunnel was constructed as part of the high-speed Gardermoen Line which runs from Oslo to Eidsvoll via Oslo Airport, Gardermoen. The tunnel makes up most of the 18-kilometre (11 mi) section between Oslo Central Station and Lillestrøm Station and was built to bypass the meandering Trunk Line which dates from 1854. Despite the older line being double track, capacity had reached its limit due to a combination of some trains making many stops and others none until Lillestrøm. The Romerike Tunnel would also be straighter and allow higher through speeds, decreasing travel time from 29 to 12 minutes. The decision to build the Gardermoen Line and Romerike Tunnel was taken by the Norwegian Parliament on 8 October 1992, with the opening planned for six years later on 8 October 1998.

An alternative airport site to Gardermoen was proposed at Hurum, south-west of Oslo. Had Hurum been chosen, the Gardermoen Line would not have been necessary for the airport express train, but the planning documents recommended that construction still proceed to ease traffic congestion north of Oslo. The tunnel is used by all trains on the Gardermoen Line, including the Flytoget airport express, and the regional and express trains which continue via the Dovre Line. Local trains on the Hoved Line and Kongsvinger Line to the north also use the tunnel. Use of the Hoved Line is limited to freight trains and commuter trains which make stops along the route.

== Construction ==
Construction started in August 1994, after a tender had been won by Scandinavian Rock Group (SRG), a collaboration between Målselv Anlegg, Nor Entreprenør and Peab. The original contract price was NOK 541 million. An average of 388 man-years were expended during construction, and the work involved the removal of 1.62 million tonnes of rock. There were three excavation points (headings), located at Bryn, Starveien on the Oslo–Lørenskog border, and at Stalsberg, outside Lillestrøm.

The tunnel is 14.580 kilometres (9.060 mi) long with a 105 m^{2} (1,130 sq ft) cross-section, making it the longest tunnel in Norway when it opened, and the second longest since the opening of the Lærdal road tunnel. It allows speeds of 210 km/h (130 mph), with a slope of 0.2–0.4% slanting upwards towards Lillestrøm. This provides a natural updraft in the direction of Lillestrøm, but a horizontal ventilation system was needed to work in the opposite direction. This is supplemented with vertical ventilation shafts at Bryn and Starveien. The tunnel is between 6 metres (20 ft) and 120 metres (390 ft) below ground, being at its deepest in the vicinity of Bryn. Trains using the tunnel must be capable of a minimum speed of 160 kilometres per hour (99 mph). The tunnel has overhead wires with 15 kV AC railway electrification (16 2/3 Hz).

=== Leakages ===
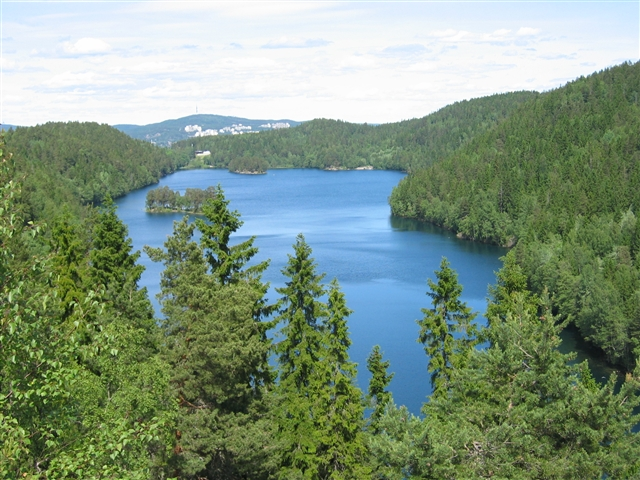
Lake Lutvann was severely depleted by problems that arose during the construction of the tunnel.

The tunnel needed to pass under Østmarka, a recreational area east of Oslo. The geology of this area is unstable, and was not ideal for tunnel boring. Pressure for its completion to coincide with the opening of the new airport resulted in tunnel excavation proceeding at maximum speed, without adequate measures to exclude water, which resulted in leaks. Houses above the route of the tunnel in Hellerud were damaged and the water levels of many lakes in Østmarka were reduced, including lakes Lutvann and Nordre Puttjern.

After the damage was discovered on 3 February 1997, legal actions were initiated by the Norwegian Water Resources and Energy Directorate requiring remedial measures to halt the leakage. At its worst, the rate of leakage into the tunnel was 3,000 litres (660 imp gal; 790 US gal) of water per minute. The Rhoca-Gil proprietary sealant process was used to stop the leaks. On investigation, Rhoca-Gil was revealed to contain a toxic substance called acrylamide, which caused health problems for the tunnel workers. The removal of Rhoca-Gil and its replacement with concrete resulted in additional delays. In addition, an extensive permanent pumping system was installed to restore and maintain lake levels in Østmarka.

Curing the leaks and cleaning up the contamination delayed the tunnel's completion by a year, and it was finally opened on 22 August 1999. The entire process was further complicated by conflicts between NSB Gardermobanen and the Scandinavian Rock Group. Retrospective surveys showed a lack of control and reporting procedures during the incidents, which should have been addressed in 1995, but were never taken seriously. Compensation was paid for approximately 60 houses which were damaged as a result of tunnel construction. An evaluation by the Ministry of Transport and Communications showed that NOK 500 million was spent fixing the leaks, but the report claimed that this was to a large extent a waste of money, resulting from inefficient engineering procedures. The same report criticized the planning and organization of the construction of the entire railway. In total the extraordinary additional costs for the tunnel totaled NOK 1.3 billion.

=== Delay ===
When the new airport opened on 8 October 1998 the Flytoget airport express trains started operating immediately, as did the Gardermoen Line from Lillestrøm to the airport and onwards to Eidsvoll. Because the tunnel was not finished, trains were required to use the old Trunk Line from Oslo Central Station to Lillestrøm. After this diversion the express trains switched to the completed section of the new Gardermoen Line between Lillestrøm and Oslo Airport. Regular operations using the Romerike Tunnel started on 22 August 1999.

== See also ==
- Hallandsås Tunnel
- List of longest tunnels
