= Thomas Havnegjerde =

Norwegian businessman

Thomas Havnegjerde (born 13 February 1962) is a Norwegian businessperson and since 2002 CEO of Flytoget.

== Biography ==
Havnegjerde is educated as a siviløkonom in 1987 from the Norwegian School of Economics and Business Administration. He worked in Scandinavian Airlines System until 2001, where he had various positions. He was hired as commercial director of Flytoget in October 2001, and became CEO in July 2002. He became chief executive of Barnebygg Gruppen in 2008.
