= Endre Skjørestad =

Norwegian politician

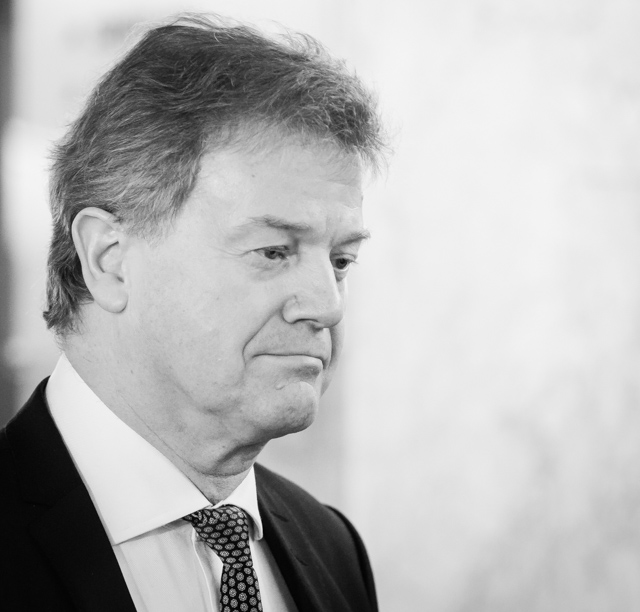
Endre Skjørestad

Endre Skjørestad (born 2 May 1953) is a Norwegian lawyer and politician for the Centre Party. He is Chair of the railway company Flytoget since 2003. He is also Chair of Nofima, deputy chair of the Financial Supervisory Authority of Norway, a board member of Gassnova and a partner in the law firm Haver. Skjørestad served as a deputy representative to the Norwegian Parliament during the terms 1993–1997, 1997–2001 and 2001–2005.

Skjørestad was educated as a lawyer with the cand.jur. degree in 1978. He worked as an assistant from 1979 to 1981, before working as an assistant judge in Ryfylke from 1982 to 1983. He started in the law firm Wyller, Pedersen og Haver in 1983, becoming a partner in 1985. He sat in Sandnes municipal council in 1984 to 1995, serving the last two years as deputy mayor. From 1997 to 2000, during the first cabinet Bondevik, he was appointed state secretary in the Ministry of Finance.
