= Nordre Puttjern =

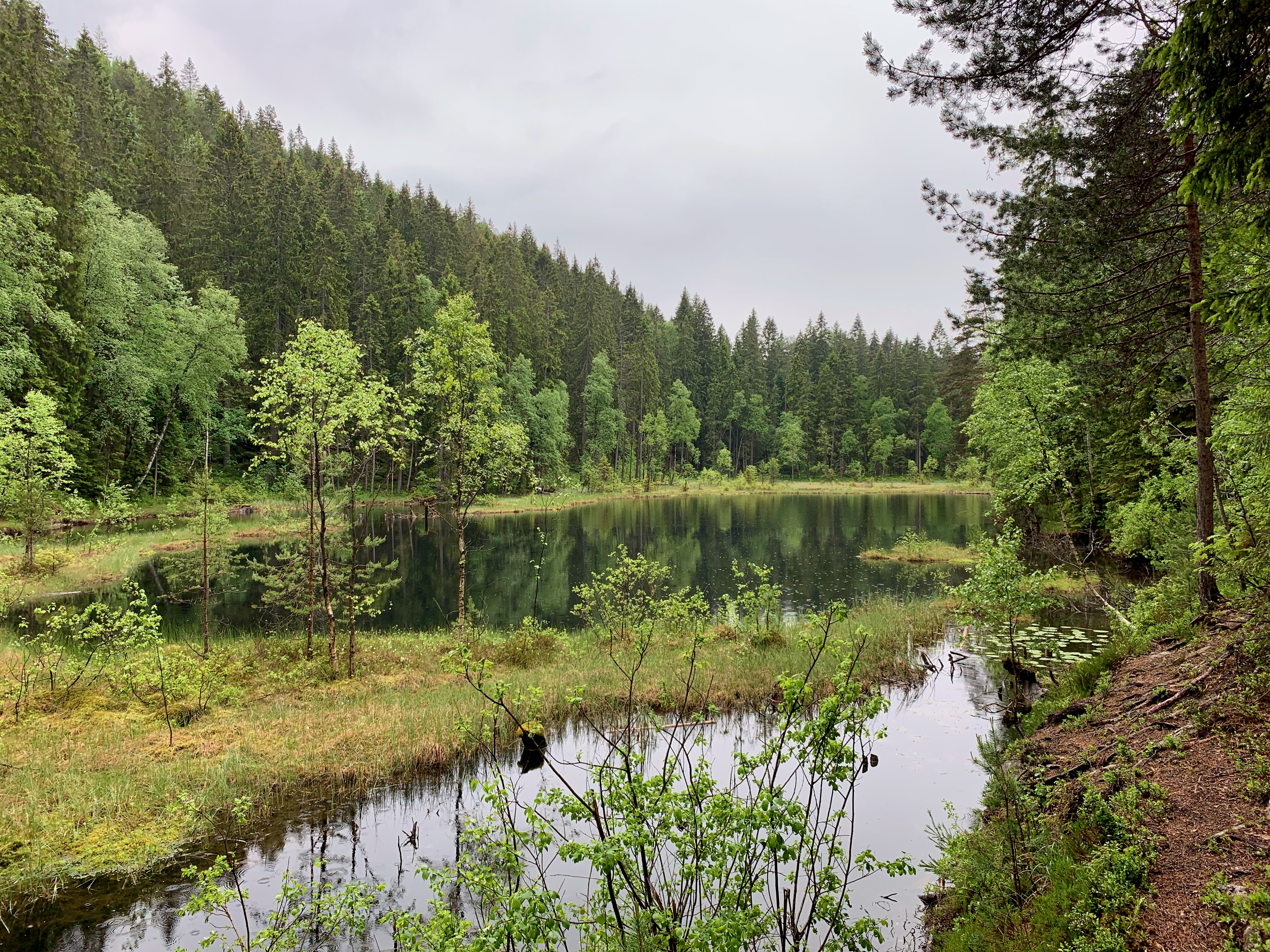

- Location within Norway Location within Europe
- Location: Østmarka, Oslo, Norway
- Coordinates: 59°55′14″N 10°53′30″E
- Type: lake

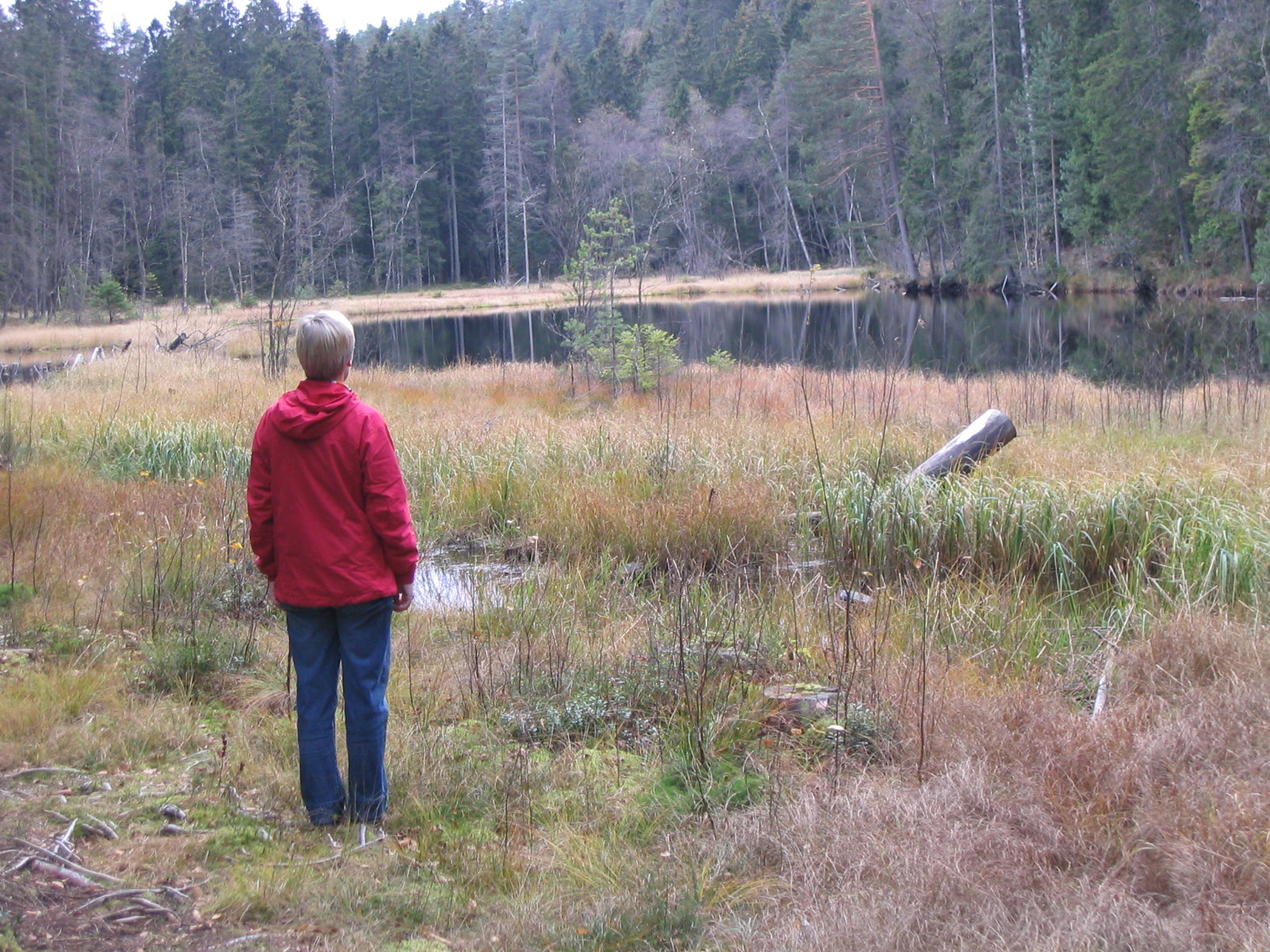
Nordre Puttjern in 2007, after the drainage was recovered

Nordre Puttjern is a lake located west of Puttåsen in the northern part of Østmarka in Oslo municipality, Norway.

Together with Søndre Puttjern lake right nearby, it was almost entirely dried up in 1997 due to a leak during the construction of the railway tunnel Romeriksporten. The water level in Nordre Puttjern dropped 6 metres, so that the depth was reduced from 9 to 3 metres.
