= Lutvann =

Lake in Oslo, Norway

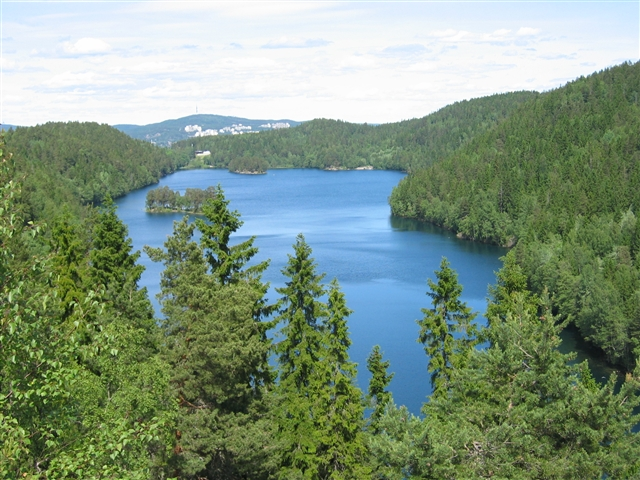
- seen from south

- Location within Norway
- Location: Oslo, Norway
- Coordinates: 59°54′45″N 10°52′38″E
- Basin countries: Norway
- Surface area: 0.39 km^{2} (0.15 sq mi)
- Max. depth: 53 m (174 ft)
- Shore length^{1}: 3.95 km (2.45 mi)
- Surface elevation: 205 m (673 ft)
- ^{1} Shore length is not a well-defined measure.

Lutvann is a lake in the recreational area Østmarka in Oslo, Norway. It covers an area of 0.39 km², at 205 m elevation.

Located just outside the capital city, it is a popular site for recreation, including swimming and fishing during summer, with brook trout in the lake. In the winter there are ski trails along and on the lake. The lake is also used by the Church of Jesus Christ of Latter-day Saints for baptism. In 2001 activists from the Youth of the Progress Party were charged for cutting down a tree in the preserved area in order to protest the fact that building in the area is prohibited.

== Romeriksporten ==
As part of the construction of the Romerike Railway Tunnel during 1994–1999, there was a leak in the tunnel that caused up to 1,000 litres per minute to leak into the tunnel from the lake above. Though the leakages had started in 1995, it was not until after they were discovered on February 3, 1997 sanctions were initiated by the Norwegian Water Resources and Energy Directorate requiring leakage removals in the tunnel.

To solve the problem, the chemical Rhoca-Gil was used to try to remove the leaks, but due to inappropriate techniques used during the utilization, the compound did not correctly polymerize, and instead started polluting the area in and around Lutvann with acrylamide and methylolacrylamide. At the same time, since the compound did not settle it did not either tighten the cracks in the bedrock, and so the leakages did not stop. It took more than one year to fix the leaks, costing about NOK 500 million. To not completely drain the lake for water about 200 litres per minute of water was pumped into Lutvann from other lakes. Lutvann was not as seriously affected by the drainage of Nordre Puttjern. During the entire process lasting about a year the two lakes leaked about two million litres of water through the tunnel.

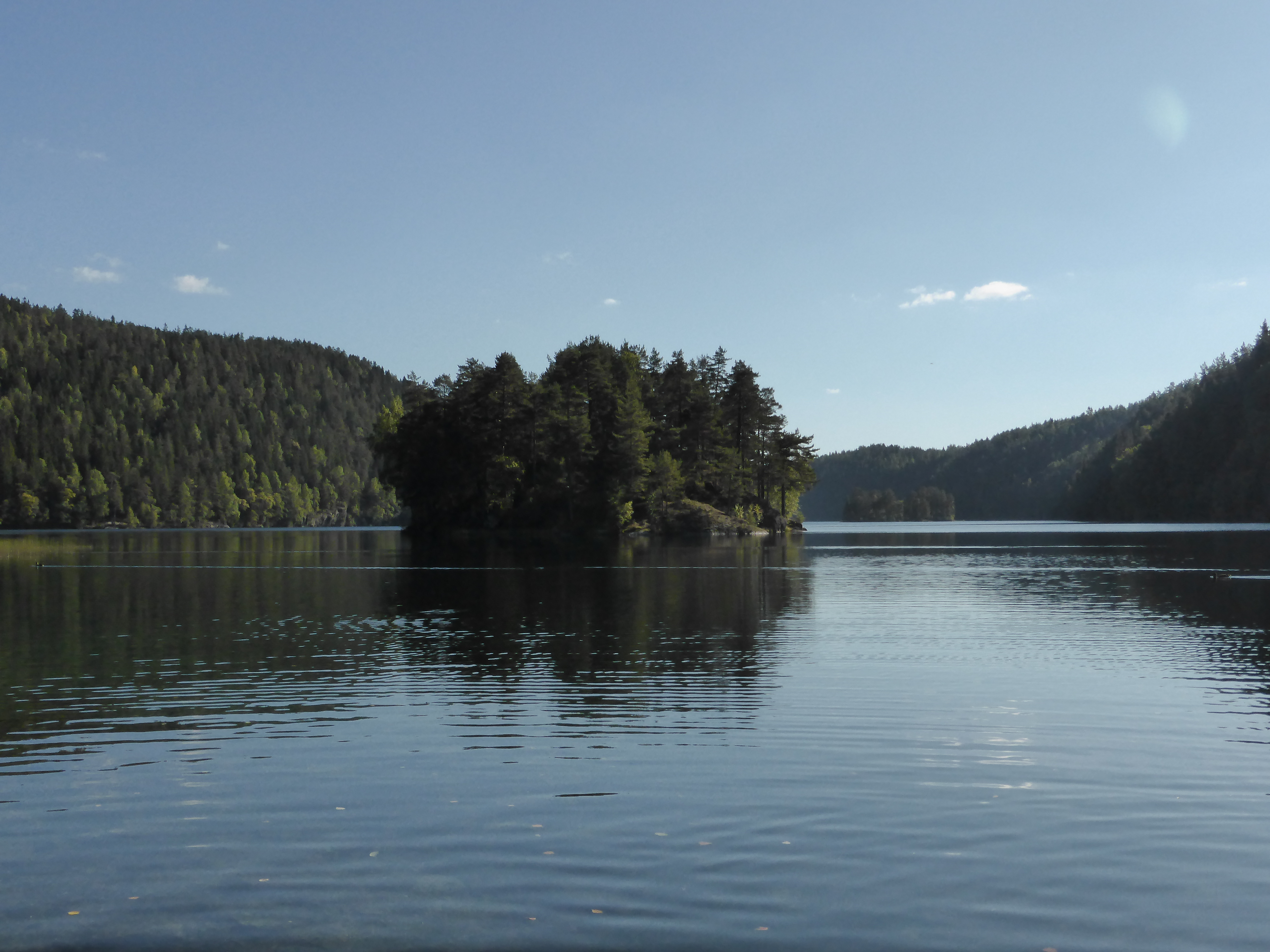
Lutvann from north

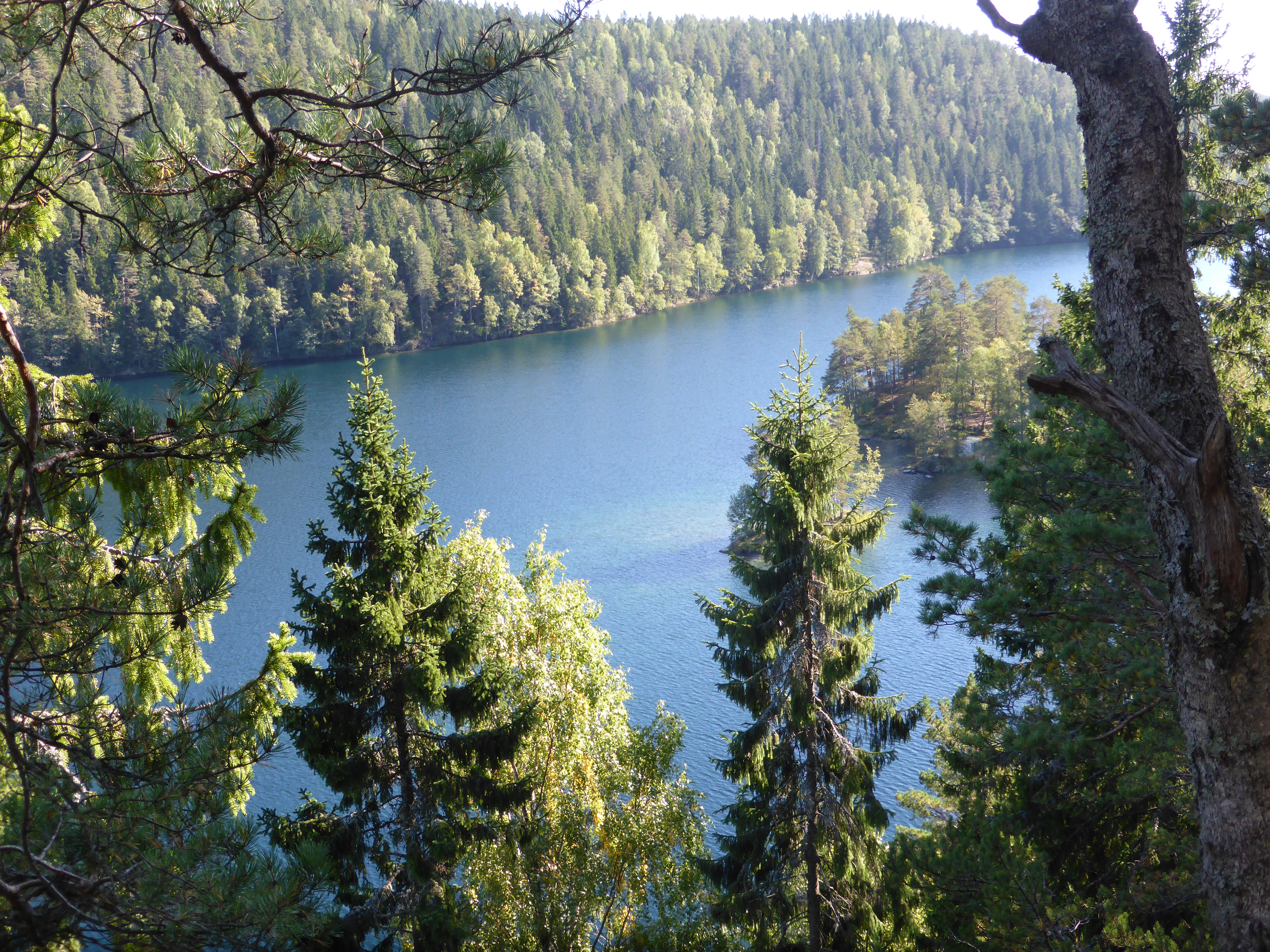
Lutvann from south
