= Østmarka =

Forested area near Oslo, Norway

Coordinates: 59°51′7.41″N 10°57′59.09″E

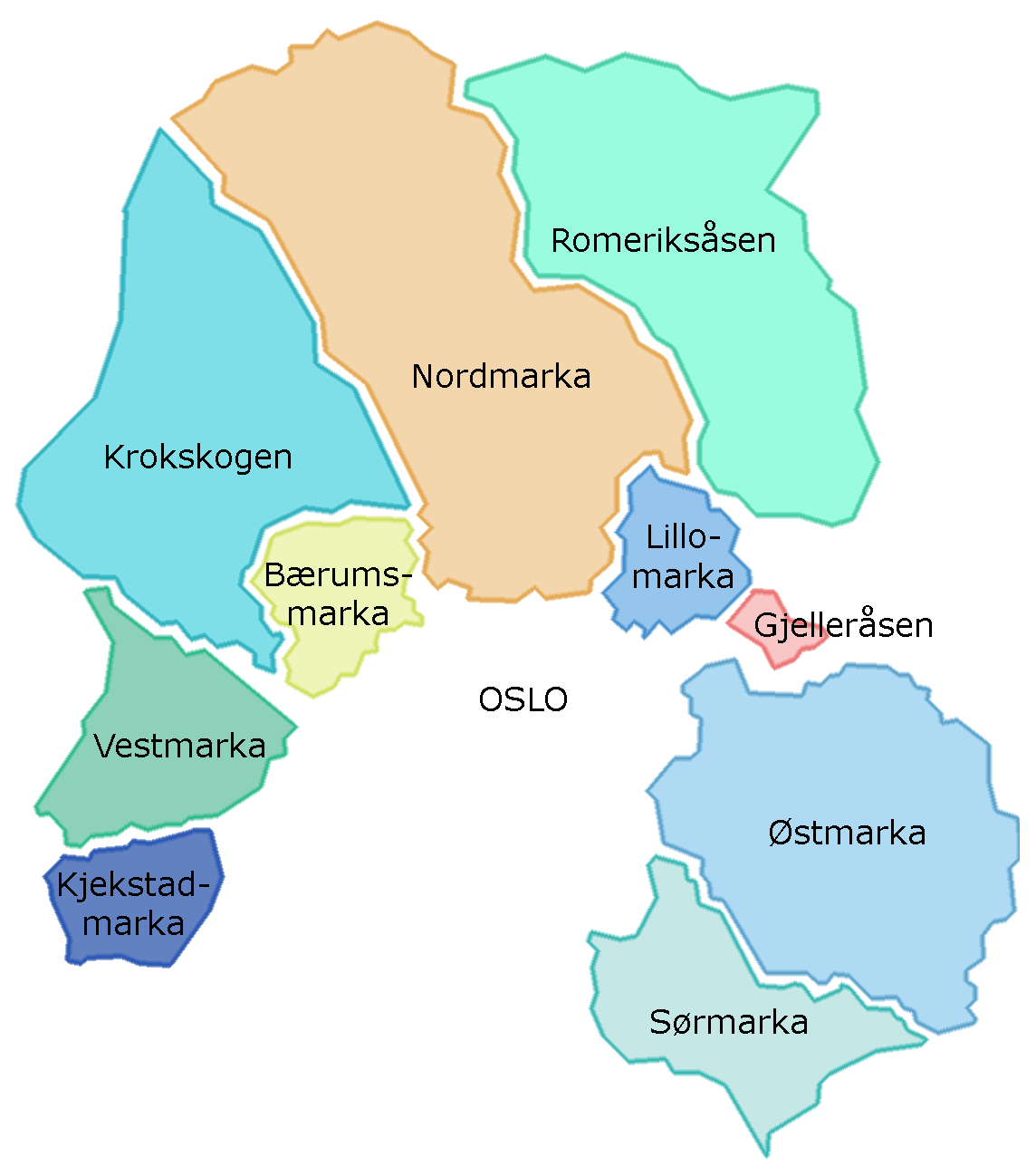
Map of Oslomarka

Østmarka is a forested area to the east of Oslo and part of the congregation of woodland areas known as Oslomarka. The area is situated within the municipalities Oslo, Lørenskog, Rælingen, Ski and Enebakk. Østmarka is delimited to the west by populated areas of Oslo, to the north of communities of Skårer, Lørenskog and Rælingen and to the east by the lake Øyeren, to the south-east lies Enebakk and to the south-west Sørmarka, another forested area.

The change from Østmarka to Sørmarka takes place at the lake Langen. Østmarka is marked by its location on top of basement rock (more than 1 billion years old) containing easy-to-see folds that make up valleys and hills in the north-south direction. For this reason the terrain has a lot of hills, no matter where one goes.

Along the upper marine border (about 210 meters) the ice of the last ice age has left large amounts of gravel and sand. Sand, Sandbakken ("Sandy Hill"), Sandbekken ("Sandy Creek") and Grusbakken ("Gravel Hill") are all on about the same elevation. The sand mines at Ødegården have been left there by the ice. Beach snails have been found at Lutvann at an elevation of 200 meters.

== Nature reserve ==
Østmarka nature reserve has an area of 18 square kilometers. It received its status in 1990 and was expanded in 2002. The purpose of the protection is the conservation of a substantial, relatively untouched coniferous forest along with plant and animal life typical for this part of Oslomarka, and which has particular scientific and educational significance. The bulk of the reserve is located in Rausjømarka and is owned by the municipalities Oslo, Lørenskog and Rælingen.

== Farms, cabins and restaurants in Østmarka ==
- Mariholtet
- Østmarkskapellet
- Rustadsaga
- Skullerudstua
- Sandbakken
- Vangen
- Losby
- Larsbråten
- Skjelbreia
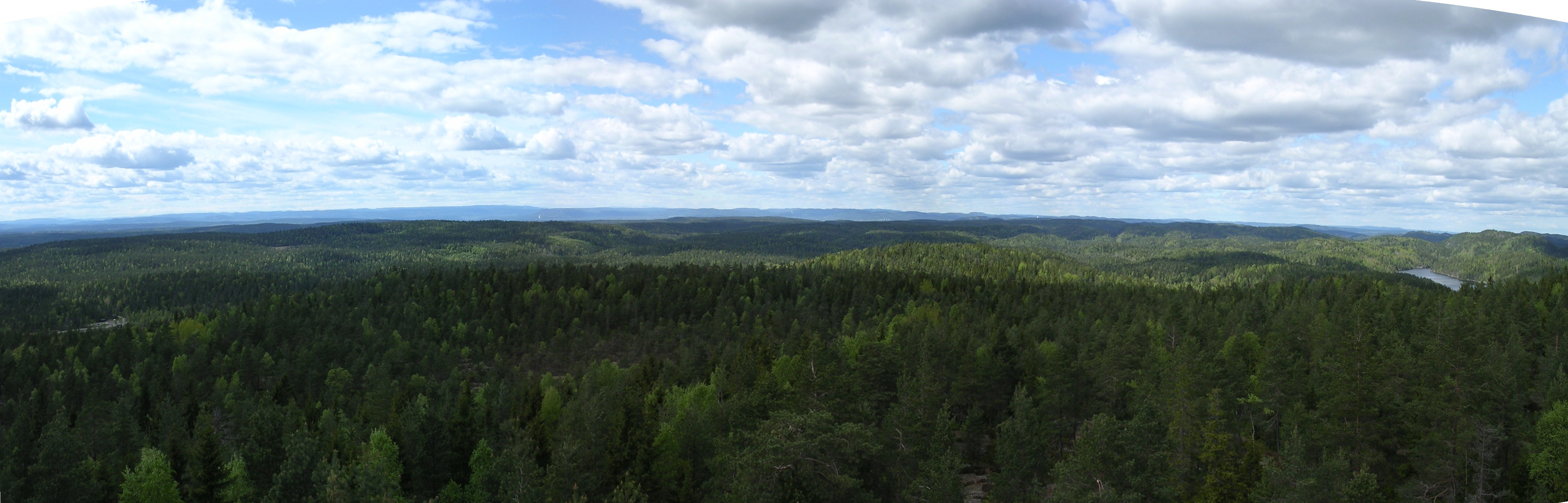
Østmarka seen from Kjerringhøgda looking north

== Highest peaks ==
Rank	Name	Elevation (MASL)
1	Barlindåsen Rælingen	398
2	Bjørnåsen (Bjønnåsen) • Rælingen	396
3	Ramstadslottet • Rælingen	394
4	Hektnerhøgåsen • Rælingen	377
5	Vardåsen • Enebakk	374
6	Fageråsen • Enebakk	373
7	Marikollen Rælingen	370
8	Tonekollen • Enebakk	368
9	Puttåsen • Oslo	363
10	Svartåsen (•) Lørenskog	361
11	Tronfjellet (•) Lørenskog	359
11	Skarpdunderen Lørenskog	359
13	Hengeberget • Enebakk	358
13	Mortvassåsen • Lørenskog	358
15	Haukåsen Oslo	357
16	Haugerkollen • Lørenskog	353
17	Snellås • Rælingen	350
18	Kjerringhøgda • Enebakk	349
18	Lisæterkollen • Lørenskog	349
20	Langmyråsen Rælingen	346
20	Mønekollen Lørenskog	346
22	Linfjellet • Lørenskog	345
22	Pipåsen • Enebakk	345
22	Grinderkollen • Enebakk	345
25	Sæterkollen Lørenskog	344
26	Svartåsen • Enebakk	343

(•) signifies that the trigonometric point is not situated on the peak's highest point.

== Largest lakes ==
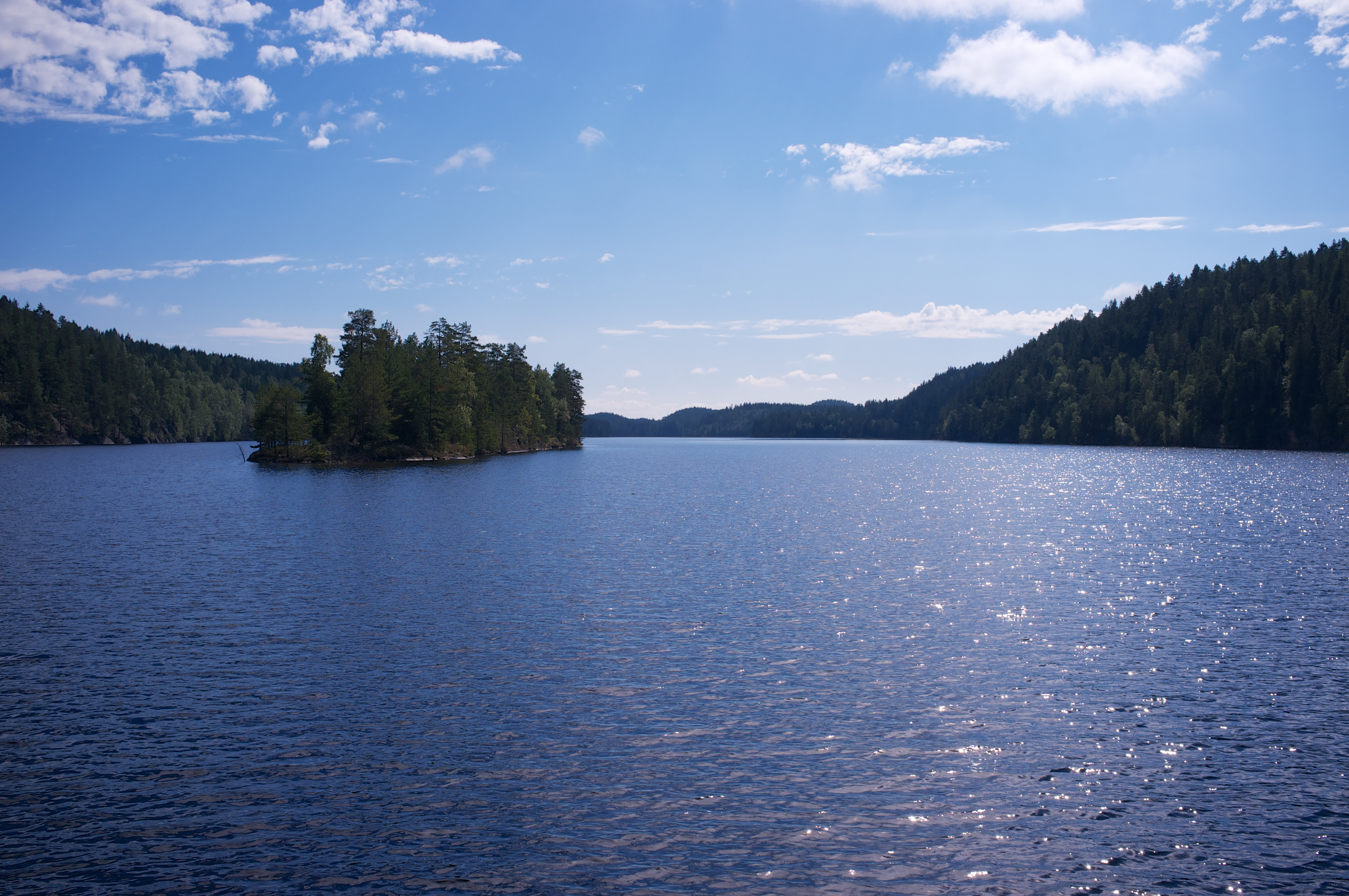
Nord-Elvåga

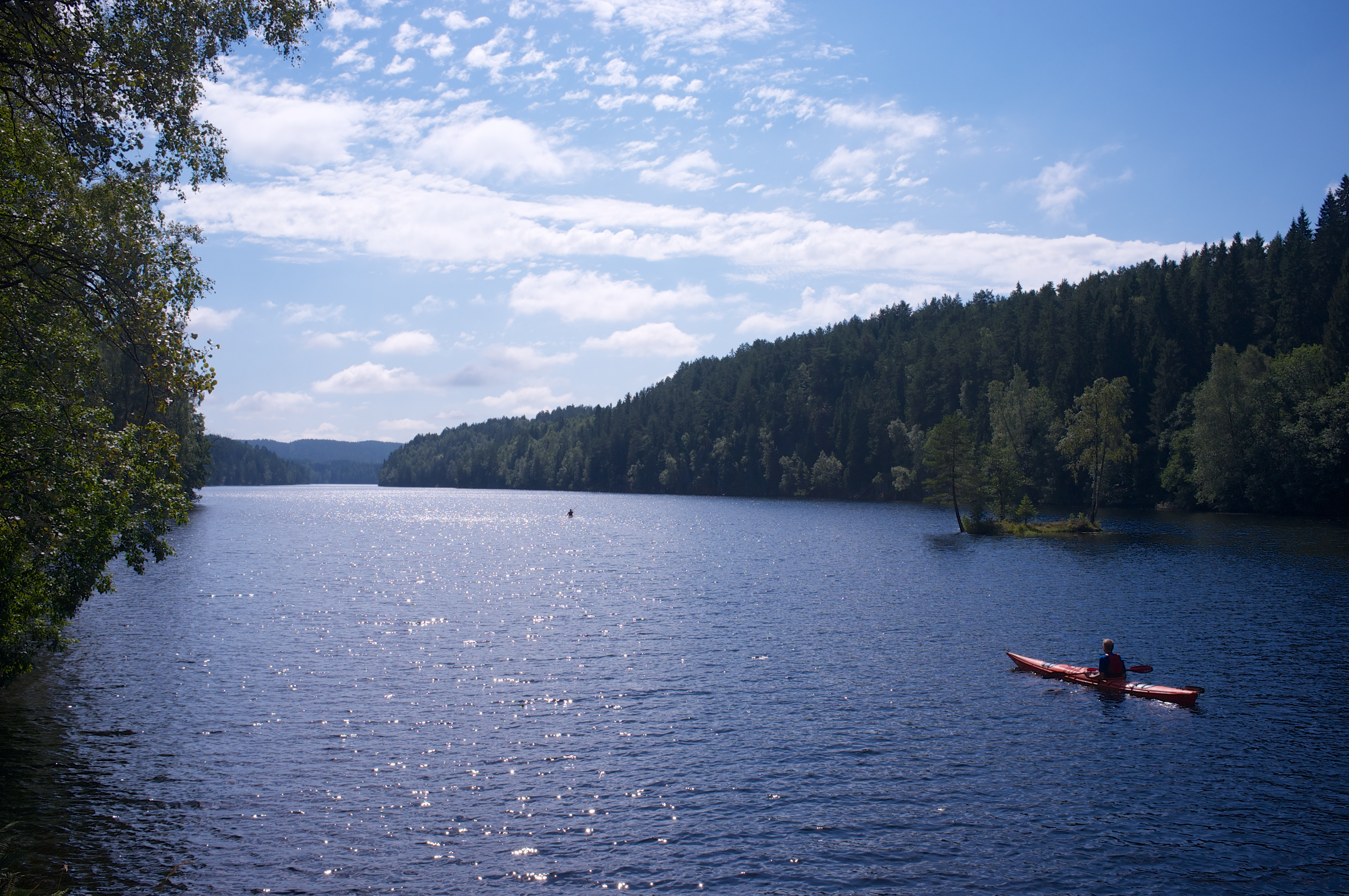
Nøklevann

Name	Area (km^{2})
Børtervann	2.58
Langen	1.49
Nord-Elvåga	1.39
Nøklevann	0.79
Nordbysjøen	0.75
Bindingsvannet	0.61
Mosjøen	0.55
Sværsvann	0.47
Lutvann	0.41
Geitsjøen	0.36
Skålsjøen	0.32
Gjeddevannet	0.29
Halsjøen	0.28
Ramstadsjøen	0.27
Mønevann	0.26
Nordre Krokvannet	0.22
Søre Krokvannet	0.22
Tonevann	0.21
Røyrivann	0.17
Morterudvann	0.16
Tappenbergvannet	0.15
Åmotdammen	0.15
Myrdammen	0.07
Steinsjøen	0.07
Motre Krokvannet	0.03

== Plank Road ==
During the period when small sawmills were being increasingly used throughout the forests of Oslomarka and the timber export became a substantial industry - from ca 1750 and well into the 19th century - this engendered a big need for transportation. In Østmarka alone there were over 2,000 drivers and 4-5000 horses occupied with moving planks between Øyeren and Kristiania (today Oslo). It was too long to drive from Enebakk via Øyeren and Strømsveien to get to Kristiania. This is why the Plank Road was built. The Plank Road starts at Eikeberg and Børter in Enebakk - it crosses the ice on Børtervann and moves up to Rausjø and turns up towards Vangen and Skjelbreia, further over Eriksvann, Søndre Skytten, Elvåga, across to Nøklevann, Rustadsaga, Østensjøvannet and down to the city. The Plank Road is today open and tagged as a ski track.

== See also ==
- Haukåsen radar

== Other sources ==
- Østmarka fra A til Å, by Even Saugstad, ISBN 82-995415-0-6.
