= Vakås Station =

Railway station in Asker, Norway

Vakås
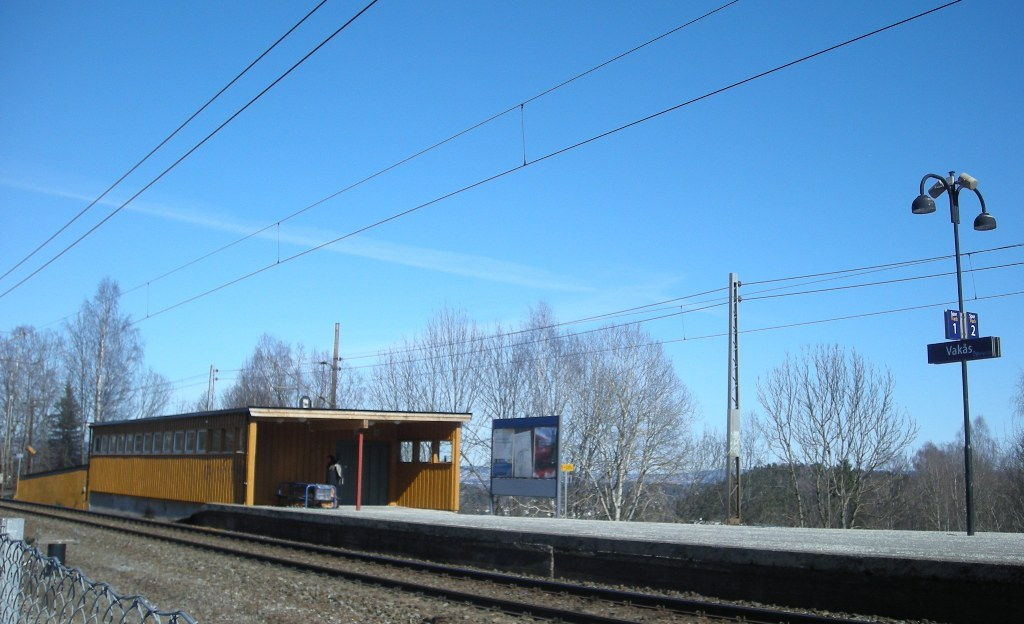

General information
- Location: Vakåsveien; Vakås, Asker; Norway
- Coordinates: 59°50′59″N 10°28′3″E
- Owner: Bane NOR
- Operator: Vy
- Line: Drammen Line
- Distance: 21.23 km (13.19 mi) from Oslo S
- Platforms: 1 island platform
- Tracks: 2

Construction
- Parking: 34 places
- Cycle facilities: Yes

Other information
- Fare zone: 2V

History
- Opened: 1 July 1957

Passengers
- 2012: 155,000 (annually)
Location
- Location within Akershus

Vakås Station (Norwegian: Vakås holdeplass) is a railway station on the Drammen Line located at Vakås in Asker, Norway. Situated 21.23 kilometers (13.19 mi) from Oslo Central Station, it consists of an island platform and serves the L1 line of the Oslo Commuter Rail operated by Vy. The station served 155,000 passengers in 2012. The station was opened on 1 July 1957 as part of the doubling of the Drammen Line.

== History ==
The Drammen Line past Vakås opened on 7 October 1872. In 1916, during the process of electrifying the line, the route was rearranged from Vakås past Hvalstad, with the new route located slightly east of the old route. This was to give a good curvature to avoid the wooden viaduct at Hvalstad. From 1953 to 1958 the section of the line between Sandvika Station and Asker Station was converted to double track. Proposals for a station at Vaksås were launched as part of this work, although it was not approved by Parliament until 1954. As part of doubling work, Vakås Station was opened on 1 July 1957.

The line past the station received automatic train stop and centralized traffic control on 12 and 14 December 1993, respectively. The station received axle counters instead of track circuits in 2012.

== Facilities ==
Vakås Station is situated on the Drammen Line, 21.23 kilometers (13.19 mi) from Oslo Central Station. The line past the station featured double track and is equipped with a 220-meter (720 ft) long and 60-centimeter (24 in) tall island platform with two tracks and a shed. The station has parking for 34 cars on the north side of the tracks and a bicycle stand. There were as of 2008 2,200 people living within 1.0 kilometer (0.62 mi) of the station and 600 jobs.

== Service ==
Vy serves Vakås with line L1 of the Oslo Commuter Rail. L1 calls at all stations, running from Spikkestad Station along the Spikkestad Line to Asker Station and past Vaksås to Oslo Central Station. It then continues along the Trunk Line to Lillestrøm Station. Slependen has two trains per direction per hour, which is scheduled to increase to four in late 2014. The station had about 500 daily passengers in 2008, and 155,000 annual passengers in 2012. Travel time to Oslo Central Station is 28 minutes.

== Bibliography ==
- Bjerke, Thor; Holom, Finn (2004). Banedata 2004 (in Norwegian). Hamar / Oslo: Norsk Jernbanemuseum / Norsk Jernbaneklubb. ISBN 82-90286-28-7.

Preceding station			Following station
Høn	Drammen Line		Hvalstad
Preceding station	Local trains		Following station
Høn	L1	Spikkestad–Oslo S–Lillestrøm	Hvalstad
