= Høn Station =

Railway station in Asker, Norway

Høn
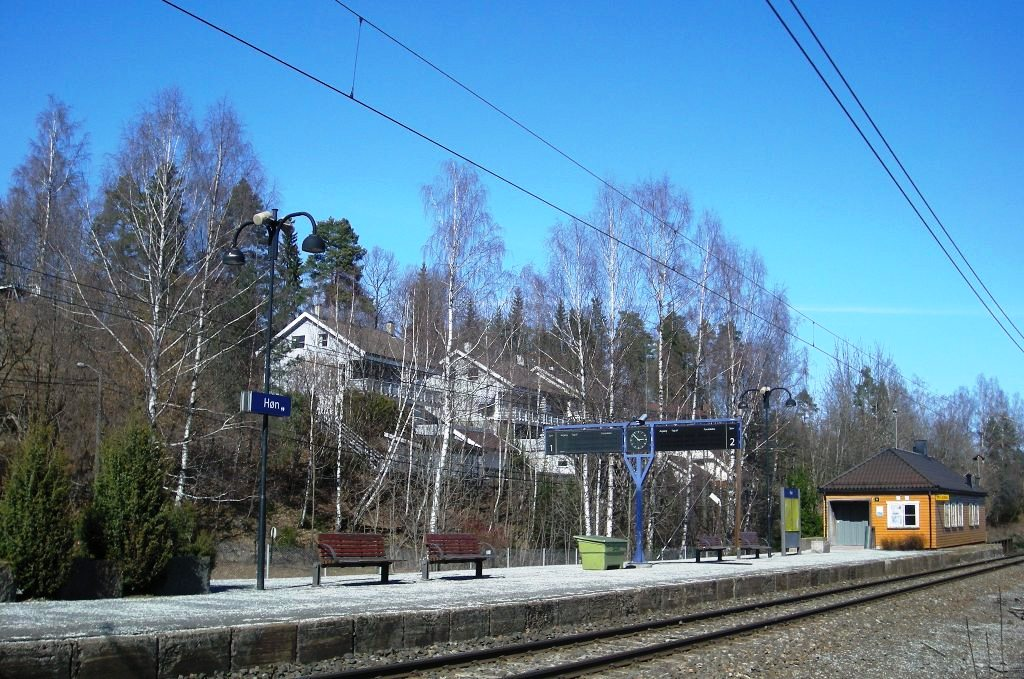

General information
- Location: Hønsveien; Høn, Asker; Norway
- Coordinates: 59°50′37″N 10°27′22″E
- Elevation: 87.0 m (285.4 ft)
- Owner: Bane NOR
- Operator: Vy
- Line: Drammen Line
- Distance: 22.17 km (13.78 mi) from Oslo V
- Platforms: 1 island platform
- Tracks: 2

Construction
- Parking: 25 places
- Cycle facilities: Yes

Other information
- Fare zone: 2V

History
- Opened: 10 December 1930

Passengers
- 2012: 130,000 (annually)
Location
- Location within Akershus

Høn Station (Norwegian: Høn stoppested) is a railway station on the Drammen Line located at Høn in Asker, Norway. Situated 22.17 kilometers (13.78 mi) from Oslo Central Station, it consists of an island platform and serves the L1 line of the Oslo Commuter Rail operated by Vy. The station served 130,000 passengers in 2012. The station opened on 10 December 1930 and received double track in 1955. It became unstaffed in 1971.

== History ==
The Drammen Line past Vakås opened on 7 October 1872. Høn Station opened as a staffed station on 10 December 1930, receiving a small station building. A new station building, designed by NSB Arkitektkontor, was completed in 1948 and was taken into use in 1951. From 1953 to 1958 the section of the line between Sandvika Station and Asker Station was converted to double track. The section from Høn Station and 1.0 kilometer (0.62 mi) towards Asker was given a new route as part of the works. This was to allow for the line to run to Asker through the Asker Tunnel. The first new track past Høn Station was taken into use on 6 September 1954 and the second on 29 November 1955.

Høn became unstaffed on 1 January 1971. The line past the station received automatic train stop and centralized traffic control on 12 and 14 December 1993, respectively. The station received axle counters instead of track circuits in 2012.

== Facilities ==
Vakås Station is situated on the Drammen Line, 22.17 kilometers (13.78 mi) from Oslo Central Station, at an elevation of 87 meters (285 ft) above mean sea level. The line past the station features double track and is equipped with a 220-meter (720 ft) long and 50-centimeter (20 in) tall island platform with two tracks and a shed. The station has parking for 25 cars and a bicycle stand. The platform is only accessible by stairs. There were as of 2008 3,100 people living within 1.0 kilometer (0.62 mi) of the station and 400 jobs.

== Service ==
Vy serves Høn with line L1 of the Oslo Commuter Rail. L1 calls at all stations, running from Spikkestad Station along the Spikkestad Line to Asker Station and past Høn to Oslo Central Station. It then continues along the Trunk Line to Lillestrøm Station. Høn has two trains per direction per hour, which is scheduled to increase to four in late 2014. The station had about 900 daily passengers in 2008, and 130,000 annually in 2012. Travel time to Oslo Central Station is 30 minutes.

== Bibliography ==
- Bjerke, Thor; Holom, Finn (2004). Banedata 2004 (in Norwegian). Hamar / Oslo: Norsk Jernbanemuseum / Norsk Jernbaneklubb. ISBN 82-90286-28-7.

Preceding station			Following station
Asker	Drammen Line		Vakås
Preceding station	Local trains		Following station
Asker	L1	Spikkestad–Oslo S–Lillestrøm	Vakås
