= Slependen Station =

Railway station in Bærum, Norway

Slependen
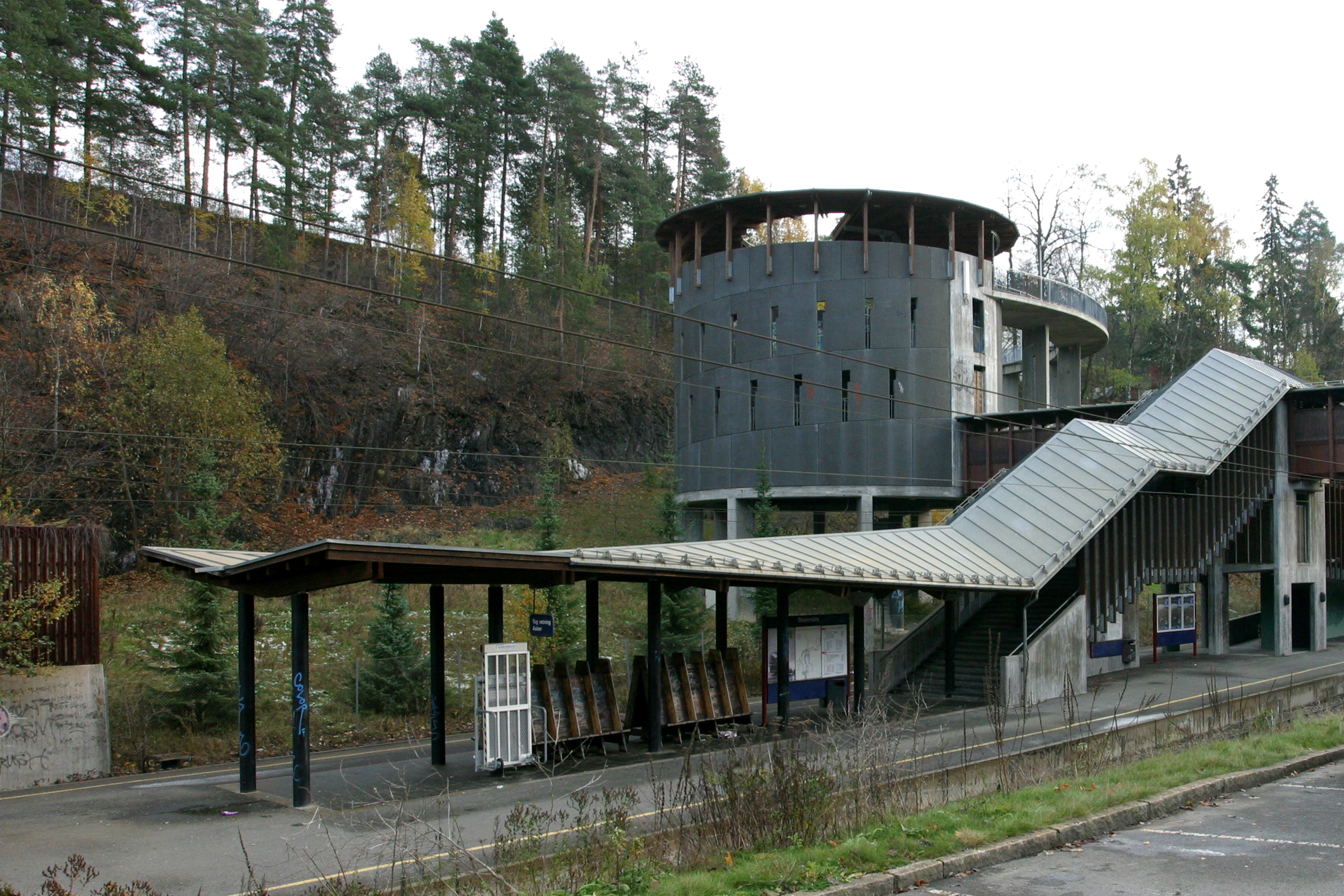

General information
- Location: Slependveien; Slependen, Bærum; Norway
- Coordinates: 59°53′7″N 10°30′10″E
- Owner: Bane NOR
- Operator: Vy
- Line: Drammen Line
- Distance: 15.82 km (9.83 mi)
- Platforms: 1 island platform
- Tracks: 2

Construction
- Parking: 80 places
- Cycle facilities: Yes
- Architect: Ina Backer (1959); Arne Henriksen (1993)

Other information
- Fare zone: 2V

History
- Opened: 11 September 1873
- Rebuilt: 1959, 23 May 1993
- Electrified: 30 August 1922

Passengers
- 2008: 900 (daily)
Location
- Location within Akershus

Slependen Station (Norwegian: Slependen holdeplass) is a railway station on the Drammen Line located at Slependen in Bærum, Norway. Situated 15.82 kilometers (9.83 mi) from Oslo Central Station, it consists of an island platform and serves the L1 line of the Oslo Commuter Rail operated by Vy. It had 900 daily passengers in 2008.

The first station at Slependen was located 270 meters (890 ft) further west and opened on 11 September 1873, a year after the Drammen Line. It was variously known as Slæbenden and Slæbende until it took its present name in 1921. A new station building was erected in 1916 and demolished in 1960. With the doubling of the Drammen Line, Slependen was rebuilt 90 meters (300 ft) to the east, still on a curve, as an elevated station. This station was designed by Ina Backer. That station and the one to the east, Jong Station, were closed on 23 May 1993 and replaced by the current station, designed by Arne Henriksen.

== History ==
The Drammen Line through Slependen opened as a narrow gauge railway on 7 October 1872. The area was at first served by Sandvika Station, but the station, initially known as Slæbenden, was opened on 11 September 1873. A year later the name was changed to Slæbende, from April 1894 as Slæbenden and received its current name in April 1921. The original station was situated 15.15 kilometers (9.41 mi) from Oslo West Station. The second station, at the same location, opened in 1916. It was demolished in 1960.

The third station at Slependen was constructed as part of the double-tracking of the Drammen Line between Sandvika and Asker. As the first of four phases, the double track past Slependen opened on 9 November 1958. Along with Billingstad Station and Hvalstad Station, Slependen was built as an elevated station. Designed by Ina Becker of NSB Arkitektkontor, it receive an island platform and was built over a road, from where the access to the station came. The station building filled the entire width of the platform and was therefore located at the end. Like the original location, Slependen was located in a curve, resulting in a cuneate shape. The polished concrete building featured a flat roof and slate cornice. The new station was situated 90 meters (300 ft) further Sandvika than the first two stations. Jong Station, situated between Slependen and Sandvika, opened in 1959. From that year Slependen Post Office moved into the station, where it remained until 1993.

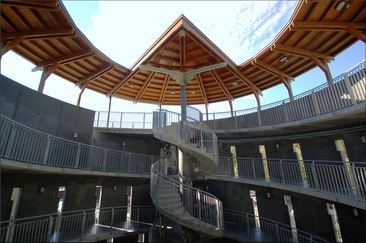
Interior of the rotunda

By the late 1980s both Slependen and Jong Stations were in poor shape and in need for modernization. In particular, the platforms were less than 170 meters (560 ft) long. NSB had just ordered new center cars for their Class 69 commuter trains and a double set would therefore exceed the platform length. Both stations were located in curves. NSB therefore proposed merging the two station, located 790 meters (2,590 ft) apart, and instead building a new station between them. This was estimated to cost 8.4 million Norwegian krone in 1986. This involved moving the station 360 meters (1,180 ft) towards Sandvika. The new station, designed by Arne Henriksen, opened on 23 May 1993, the same day the old station and Jong were closed. The old station was demolished in 1996.

== Facilities ==
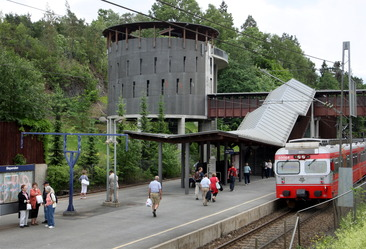
NSB Class 69 train at the station

Slependen Station is situated on the Drammen Line, 15.82 kilometers (9.83 mi) from Oslo Central Station. The line past the station featured double track and is equipped with a 220-meter (720 ft) long and 57-centimeter (22 in) tall island platform with two tracks. It is situated in a mostly residential area next to a steep slope. Access to the platform from the steep side is via a rotunda, which features a circular ramp and stairs. This is connected to the staircase on the platform via an overpass, as is access from the other side of the tracks. These are built in untreated concrete, although ceilings and walls are clad in pine. The station has parking for 80 cars.

== Service ==
Vy serves Slependen with line L1 of the Oslo Commuter Rail. L1 calls at all stations, running from Spikkestad Station along the Spikkestad Line to Asker Station and past Slependen to Oslo Central Station. It then continues along the Trunk Line to Lillestrøm Station. Slependen has two trains per direction per hour, which is scheduled to increase to four in late 2014. The station had about 900 daily passengers in 2008. Travel time to Oslo Central Station is 21 minutes.

Preceding station			Following station
Billingstad	Drammen Line		Sandvika; Jong
Preceding station	Local trains		Following station
Billingstad	L1	Spikkestad–Oslo S–Lillestrøm	Sandvika
