= Ringerike Line =

Proposed high-speed railway line between Hønefoss and Sandvika, Norway

Coordinates: 59.8917°N 10.5222°E

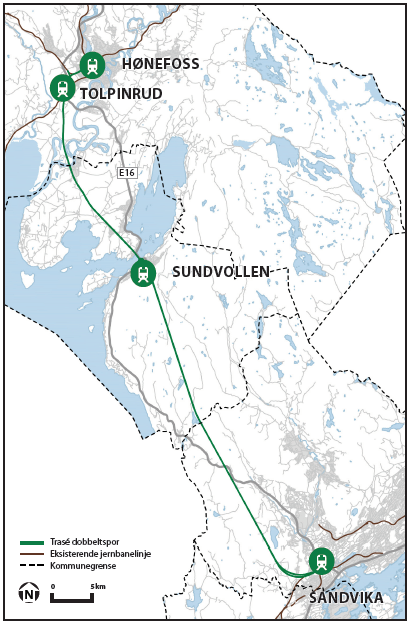
- Draft of Ringeriksbanen from 2016. Simplified version of the route adopted by the Storting.

Overview
- Native name: Ringeriksbanen or Ringeriksbana
- Status: Proposed
- Owner: Bane NOR
- Locale: Ringerike, Norway
- Termini: Sandvika Station; Hønefoss Station
- Stations: 3 (Tolpinrud station is not included in the approved centrally prepared zoning plan)

Service
- Type: Railway
- System: Norwegian railway network

History
- Planned opening: Unknown (Late 2030s to early 2040s if construction begins in the next 5 years)

Technical
- Line length: 40 kilometres (25 mi)
- Number of tracks: Double
- Character: Mixed
- Track gauge: 1,435 mm (4 ft 8 1/2 in)
- Electrification: 15 kV 16.7 Hz AC
- Operating speed: 250 km/h (155 mph)

The Ringerike Line (Bokmål: Ringeriksbanen, Nynorsk: Ringeriksbana) is a proposed 40-kilometre (25 mi) extension of the Bergen Line from Jong, Sandvika to Hønefoss, Norway. In 2022, the project was postponed; the government has no commitment to any timeframe (as of Q1 2026). Regional authorities and political groups continue to advocate for the project, which is fully planned but lacks funding and a construction start. If construction eventually begins, it is estimated to take 10–12 years to complete due to extensive tunnelling and civil works.

The proposed line would reduce travel from Oslo to Bergen by 60 kilometres (37 mi) and 50 minutes. Currently trains from the Bergen Line to Oslo must run via Drammen on the Randsfjord Line and the Drammen Line, or via Roa on the Roa–Hønefoss Line and the Gjøvik Line.

The project was presented as part of the original proposal of the Bergen Line when approved by Parliament in 1894, but due to the narrow gauge on the Drammen Line at the time, a temporary solution via Roa was chosen instead. Later proposals have been launched, and parliament has voted over it in 1954, 1978, 1984 and 1992; only the last being passed, but not followed up by funding, and Bane NOR has not allocated any date to start construction; detailed plans have however been produced.

== Route ==
The line would branch off from the Asker Line just west of Sandvika Station, and continue mostly in tunnel to Hønefoss Station, with an intermediate station at Sundvollen. Originally it was planned to build only single track, sufficient passing loops every six to eight kilometers, each at 750 metres (2,460 ft), allowing 600 metres (2,000 ft) long freight trains. Capacity would have been eight trains per hour operating at 200 km/h (125 mph). Current plans are to build the line as double track for a speed of 250 km/h, permitting both freight and passenger trains through 22.5 tonne axle load and maximum 1.2% gradient; electrification would be at the Norwegian standard 15 kV 16.7 Hz AC. In 2002 a route over Åsa was preferred to a route over Kroksund by parliament; despite less passenger potential for local traffic and NOK 700 million more expensive, this would give a smaller environmental impact. Travel time for the quickest trains from Hønefoss to Oslo would be 30 minutes, compared to 60 minutes by bus or 95 minutes by current trains.

The Norwegian National Rail Administration has proposed a number of upgrades to the Bergen Line that would allow total travel time between the termini to reduce to four and a half hours. The Ringerike Line is seen as the hallmark of this attempt, that was first launched by the director of NSB in 1954; sixty years later travel time remains at six and a half hours. The project was in 2007 estimated to cost NOK 7 billion, of which NOK 4 billion would be for the line. As of 2018 the project including a parallel motorway is estimated to cost NOK 26 billion This includes a train speed raised to 250 km/h and a 23 km long railway tunnel, and a permitted road speed raised to 110 km/h.

Prior to 1989 there were four local trains in each direction from Oslo to Hønefoss; followed by one rush hour service each, but this single service has since been terminated; mainly due to quicker travel times by coaches. The Ringerike Line would allow the Oslo Commuter Rail once again to serve Ringerike; other places served usually have one hourly service, with additional services in rush hour. Reducing travel time from Hønefoss to Oslo to 30 minutes would probably cause larger population growth in Ringerike.

A problem is that the train traffic in the Oslo Tunnel between Skøyen and Oslo is already at maximum capacity, and there is not room for the trains on the Ringerike Line. A new tunnel at that place is suggested, but it would be expensive and make the cost for the Ringerike Line and its needed additions be more unfeasible.

== History ==
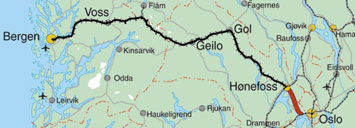
Map of the Bergen Railway. The proposed Ringerike Line.

Initial proposals for the Bergens Line route went from Hønefoss via Sandvika to Oslo Vestbanestasjon (Oslo V), but the proposal met technical and political restrictions. At the time Norway had two rail gauges: 1,435 mm (4 ft 8 1/2 in) standard gauge and narrow gauge 3 ft 6 in (1,067 mm). The former was taking predominance over the latter, with among others the Voss Line, the initial stage of the Bergen Line from Bergen to Voss, being converted from narrow to standard gauge. Drammenbanen, that connected Sandvika to Oslo, was narrow gauge, as was most of the rest of the western network, including the Vestfold Line; hundreds of kilometers of railway would have to be converted.

On the other side of Oslo, the North Line (now named the Gjøvik Line) was being built as standard gauge; it was considered the new mainline northwards, and was to be connected to the mainline through Gudbrandsdalen. By building a branch line from Roa to Hønefoss, the Bergens Line could be connected to Nordbanen, allowing standard gauge trackage all the way to Oslo Østbanestasjon (Oslo Ø). This also gave another advantage, as Oslo Ø was seen as superior to Oslo V; the latter only served limited commuter routes west of town while Oslo Ø was the main station for long-distance trains to Trondheim, as well as Gothenburg and Stockholm in Sweden, with whom Norway was in a union with at the time. Only by terminating at Oslo Ø would direct transfer to trains to other parts of the country be possible.

When parliament passed the building of the Bergen Line in 1894, the Roa–Hønefoss branch line was made part of the plans; but the line was given a separate name indicating that the Bergen Line would continue from Hønefoss to Oslo in a more direct route. But after the finish of the Bergen Line, other important mainline routes, in particular the Dovre Line, Sørland Line and Nordland Line, combined with the effort to convert narrow gauge line, took precedence. Ideas for the additional construction of the Ringerike Line were pressed by commercial interests in Ringerike in both 1890 and 1906, but failed both times.

In 1955 the Bergen businessperson Fritz Rieber launched an idea for the shortening of Bergensbanen; the Ulriken Tunnel through the Bergen mountains, electrification from Voss to Bergen, and the construction of the Ringerike Line. Private financing would be provided through a dedicated limited company taking a surcharge on tickets, equal to the reduction in fare induced by the shorter line; within twenty years the debt would be covered. Passed by parliament in 1955, a year later they had changed their minds and only the investments around Bergen were supported; removing the support for Ringerike. Prime Minister Trygve Bratteli commented that private debt financing would have to compete with the debt taken up by the government on other railway projects, since politicians had to see the national economy as a whole, and that private financing would not allow more lines to be built. The cost was estimated at NOK 100 million.

New proposals were debated in parliament in 1978, and again in 1984, but failing to be passed. The final decision to build the line was taken in 1992 as part of a political swap between the Labour Party and the Socialist Left Party; the Labour Party would support the line if the Socialist Left Party would support building European route E16 via the Lærdal Tunnel and Valdres, instead of via Hol Municipality or Eidfjord Municipality. Initially the agreement involved the completion of the Ringerike Line in 1997, but as of 2008 no date or funding has been set. Director of the Rail Administration, Steinar Killi, stated in 2008 that the period 2010-19 would be a natural time for completion, but only if more overall funding for railway infrastructure is provided. As either an alternative or supplement to the line, expansion of European Road E16 from Sandvika to Hønefoss has been proposed. It would involve increasing from two to four lanes on the first 17 kilometres (11 mi) from Bjørum to Hvervenmoen, estimating to cost NOK 3.5 billion; local politicians have suggested toll road financing.

=== 2000s and 2010s ===
The Ministry of Transport and Communications started an evaluation of the Ringerike Line, carried out by the National Rail Administration, in 2006. The first edition was completed in 2009, but was found to be insufficient, resulting in the process being restarted. A new report was published in June 2011. In September 2012, the ministry concluded that also the second report was insufficient and that it would be discarded. There were two main concerns with the report. Firstly, it was based on a single-track line which would not be built to the standards of high-speed rail. The ministry stated that all new railway plans in Norway were to have double track and be optimized for high-speed rail. Secondly, the report had a simplified economic analysis which was not sufficient to be used for political evaluation. The evaluation were based on the directives given to them and rules valid at the time, but the evaluations of the evaluations showed that the directives had to be updated. The result of the discards was that the planning of E16 was no longer tied to the planning of the railway. In 2015 the railway planning was re-tied to the northern half of the E16 road upgrade which was also delayed.

=== 2020s ===
Local municipalities and regional stakeholders continue to emphasize the line’s importance. In late 2025, the Ringerike Regional Council, along with members of Parliament and organizations such as Forum Nye Bergensbanen and the RingHall Alliance, called for urgent action, noting that the project is “ready for construction” but lacks start-up funding and political prioritization. Regional representatives cited resistance from national railway authorities, limited political engagement, and insufficient public pressure as key reasons for delays. Efforts are ongoing to increase visibility, coordinate support across municipalities, and secure initial funding through the national budget.

If construction eventually begins, independent planning documents and regional reports estimate Ringeriksbanen could take approximately 10–12 years to complete due to extensive tunnelling and civil works required along the 40 km route.
