= Hvalstad Station =

Railway station in Asker, Norway

Hvalstad
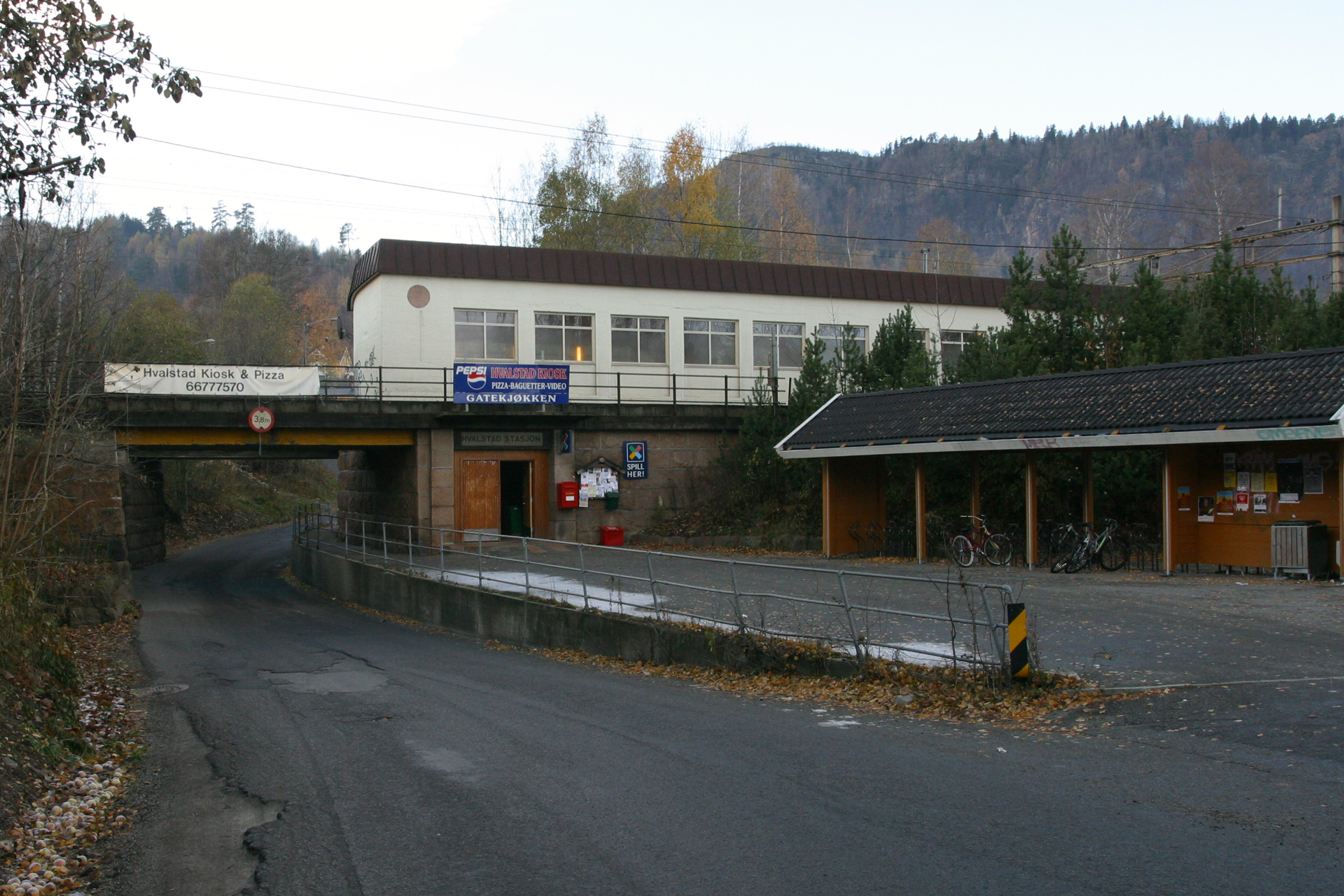
- Kristiansen's elevated station is the third station building at Hvalstad

General information
- Location: Hvalstadveien; Hvalstad, Asker; Norway
- Coordinates: 59°51′32″N 10°27′43″E
- Elevation: 64.0 m (210.0 ft)
- Owner: Bane NOR
- Operator: Vy
- Line: Drammen Line
- Distance: 20.19 km (12.55 mi) from Oslo S
- Platforms: 1 island platform

Construction
- Structure type: Elevated
- Parking: 33 places
- Architect: Georg Andreas Bull (1872); Jens Flor (1916); Julia Kristiansen (1957)

Other information
- Fare zone: 2V

History
- Opened: 7 October 1872
- Rebuilt: 1915, 1957
- Electrified: 30 August 1922

Passengers
- 2012: 233,000 (annually)
Location
- Location within Akershus

Hvalstad Station (Norwegian: Hvalstad stasjon) is a railway station of the Drammen Line located at Hvalstad in Asker, Norway. Situated 20.19 kilometers (12.55 mi) from Oslo Central Station, it consists of an island platform and serves the L1 line of the Oslo Commuter Rail operated by Vy. The station served 233,000 passengers in 2012.

The line opened at the same time as the Drammen Line on 7 October 1872. The first station building was a wooden structure designed by Georg Andreas Bull. The station was moved in 1915 to its current location. This resulted in another wooden station building, designed by Jens Flor. The third station building, designed by Julie Kristiansen, was completed in 1957. This resulted in the station being raised to an elevated structure. Bull's building has been demolished, while Flor's and Kristiansen's have been listed as heritage sites.

== History ==
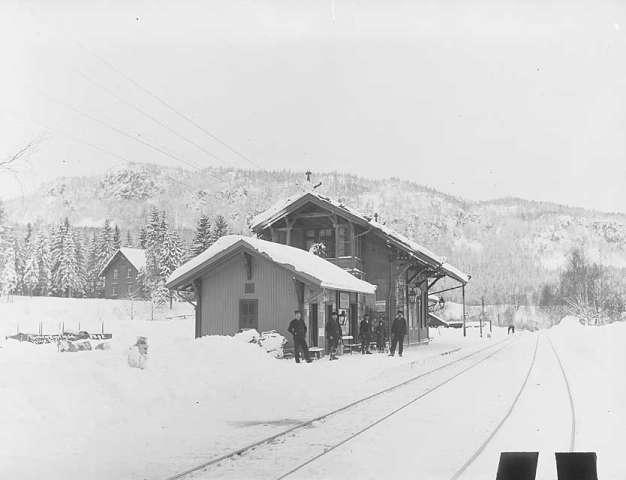
Bull's original station building in 1904

Hvalstad was along with Asker Station the only stations to be opened along with the Drammen Line on 8 October 1872. The first station building was a simple wooden structure designed by Georg Andreas Bull. It was a stable design, which was seen on several low-traffic stations along the Randsfjorden Line, the Drammen Line and the Jæren Line. Near the station there was a wooden viaduct, the 176-meter (577 ft) Hvalstad Viaduct. It was the largest of its kind in Northern Europe and became a tourist attraction. The station became the natural center for the area and soon both residences and shops.

In the mid-1910s, the Norwegian State Railways decided to replace Hvalstad Viaduct. This required the rebuilding of 1.2 kilometers (0.75 mi) of the Drammen Line past Hvalstad. It also required the moving of the station, about 200 meters (660 ft) parallel to the tracks to the southwest. This also involved the construction of a tunnel on each side of the new station, the 29-meter (95 ft) Hvalstad 2 Tunnel to the north and the 130-meter (430 ft) Hvalstad 3 Tunnel. The new station received a new station building, designed by Jens Flor of NSB Arkitektkontor. The new segment of track opened on 14 June 1915 and the old viaduct was demolished in 1916.

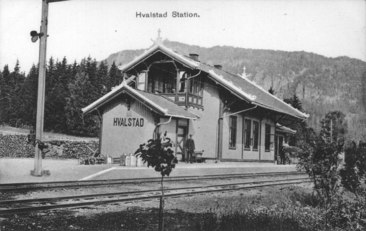
Bull's original station building

The line past Hvalstad was electrified on 30 August 1922, and the station received an interlocking system on 20 September 1929. The line between Sandvika Station and Asker Station was doubled between 1953 and 1958. This resulted in a new tunnel being built south of Hvalstad Station for both tracks, replacing the old tunnel. The segment of double track between Billingstad and Hvalstad opened on 24 July 1953 and the segment from Hvalstad to Asker Tunnel opened on 29 November 1955.

NSB Arkitektkontor carried out the design of the new station and Julie Kristiansen was the architect for Hvalstad. Similar to Billingstad and Slependen, Hvalstad was rebuilt as an elevated station with an underpass for traffic and access from below. The new station was taken into use in 1957. It was used both for ticket sales and had a Narvesen kiosk. Bull's original station was demolished in 1960. From the 1960s there was a substantial construction of residences in the station's catchment area.

The line past the station received automatic train stop and centralized traffic control on 12 and 14 December 1993, respectively. The station received a renovation in 2011, including receiving axle counters instead of track circuits in 2012. Akershus County Municipality has looked into the possibility for building additional parking places at the station to allow it to become a park and ride complex. A survey from 2010 showed that 25 of 40 people parking at the station lived within 1-kilometer (0.62 mi) of the station.

== Facilities ==
Hvalstad Station is situated on the Drammen Line, 21.23 kilometers (13.19 mi) from Oslo Central Station, at an elevation of 64.0 meters (210.0 ft) above mean sea level. Located on a segment of double track, the station features a 220-meter (720 ft) long and 60-centimeter (24 in) tall island platform with two tracks and a shed.

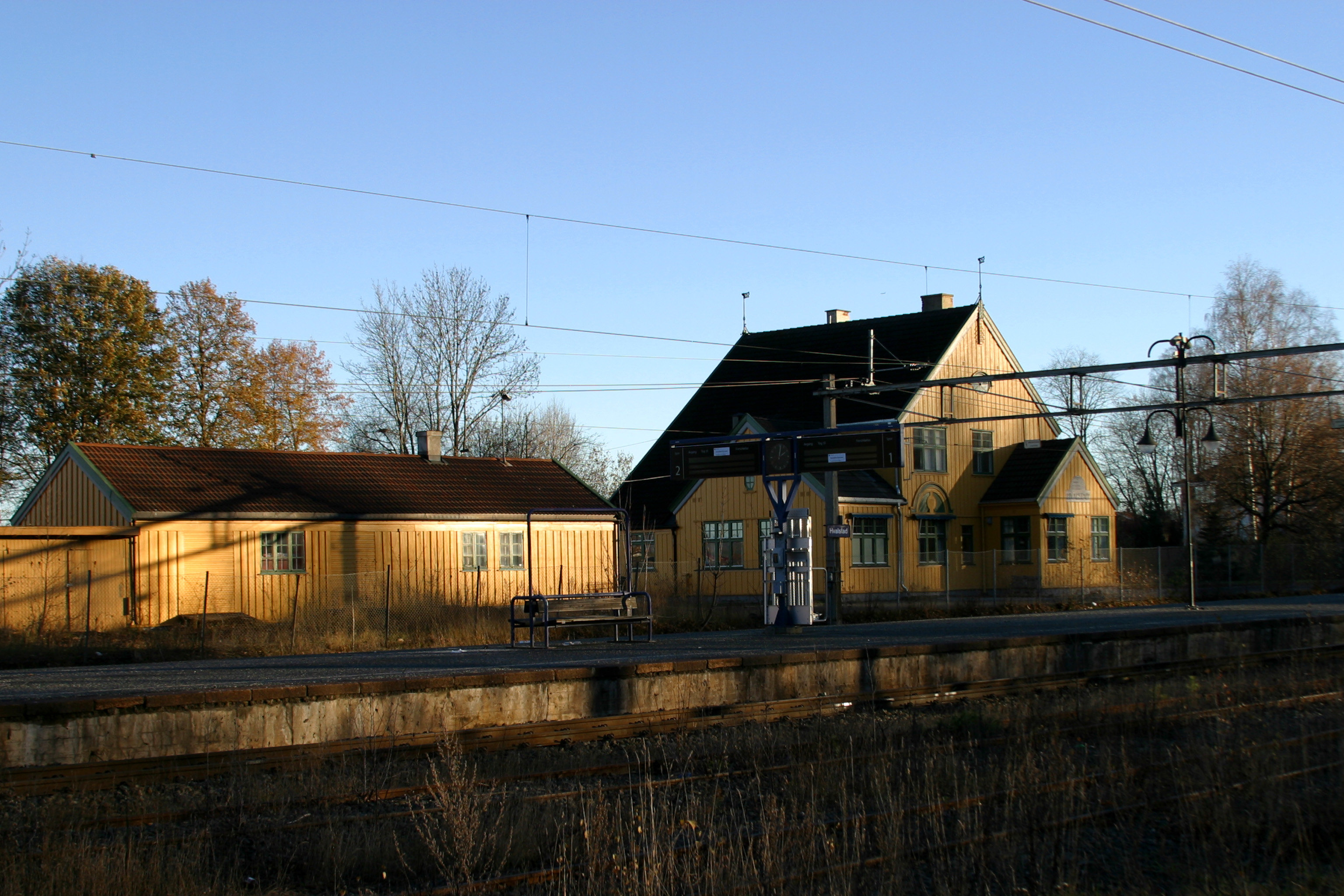
Flor's station building from 1915 has been listed as a heritage site

The station is elevated with an underpass over the road and access from below. Kristiansen's station building is made of polished concrete and square in shape. Because it covers the entire width of the platform, it was located at the end. It was built to solely serve local traffic and lacks any cargo or other advanced features. Next to the station is Flor's wooden station building. It features detailed wooden decors over the oval gable windows and doors. It is now used as a residence and veterinary clinic. Both have been listed as heritage sites. Flor's because of its intricate and aesthetic design, while Kristiansen has been listed as a representative of the simple, concrete elevated stations built during the 1950s. In addition, they vicinity and contrast were decisive in determining their protection status.

The station has parking for 33 cars and a bicycle stand. Hvalstad is primarily a residential area. Within 1.0 kilometer (0.62 mi) there are, as of 2008, 2,200 residents and 600 jobs.

== Service ==
Vy serves Hvalstad with line L1 of the Oslo Commuter Rail. L1 calls at all stations, running from Spikkestad Station along the Spikkestad Line to Asker Station and past Slependen to Oslo Central Station. It then continues along the Trunk Line to Lillestrøm Station. Hvalstad has two trains per direction per hour, which is scheduled to increase to four in late 2014. The station had about 900 daily passengers in 2008, and 230,000 annually in 2012. Travel time to Oslo Central Station is 26 minutes.

== Bibliography ==
- Bjerke, Thor; Holom, Finn (2004). Banedata 2004 (in Norwegian). Hamar / Oslo: Norsk Jernbanemuseum / Norsk Jernbaneklubb. ISBN 82-90286-28-7.
- Hartmann, Eivind; Mangset, Øistein; Reisegg, Øyvind (1997). Neste stasjon (in Norwegian). Gyldendal. ISBN 82-05-25294-7.

Preceding station			Following station
Vakås	Drammen Line		Billingstad
Preceding station	Local trains		Following station
Vakås	L1	Spikkestad–Oslo S–Lillestrøm	Billingstad
