= Billingstad station =

Railway station in Asker, Norway

Billingstad
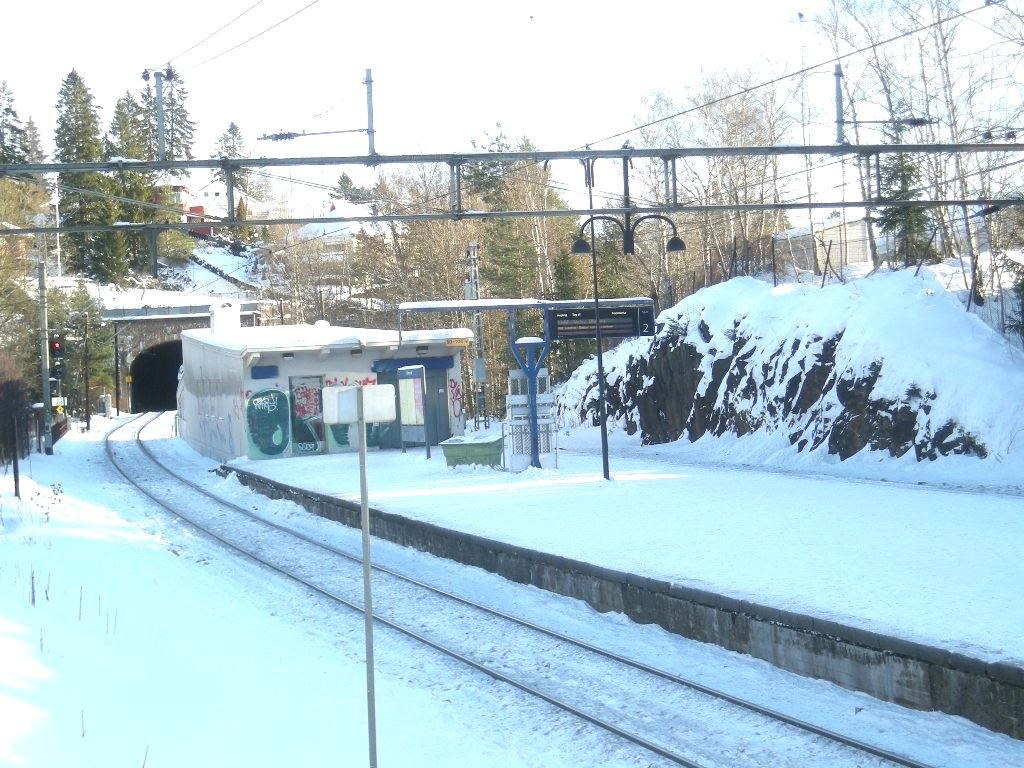
- Larsen's station building with the Billingstad Tunnel behind

General information
- Location: Stasjonsveien; Billingstad, Asker; Norway
- Coordinates: 59°52′30″N 10°29′2″E
- Elevation: 41.2 m (135 ft)
- Owner: Bane NOR
- Operator: Vy
- Line: Drammen Line
- Distance: 17.62 km (10.95 mi) from Oslo S
- Platforms: 1 island platform
- Tracks: 2

Construction
- Structure type: Elevated
- Parking: 48 places
- Cycle facilities: Yes
- Architect: Torolf Larsen

Other information
- Fare zone: 2V

History
- Opened: 3 March 1919
- Rebuilt: 1959
- Electrified: 30 August 1922

Passengers
- 2012: 250,000 (annually)
Location
- Location within Akershus

Billingstad Station (Norwegian: Billingstad stasjon) is a railway station of the Drammen Line located at Billingstad in Asker, Norway. Situated 17.62 kilometers (10.95 mi) from Oslo Central Station, it consists of an island platform and serves the L1 line of the Oslo Commuter Rail operated by Vy. The station served 255,000 passengers in 2012. It opened on 3 March 1919; it received a rebuilt in 1958, becoming an elevated station on a section of double track.

== History ==
The Drammen Line past Billingstad opened on 7 October 1872. Inga Falsen Gjerdrum was the main enthusiast to establish a station at Billingstad, and a street near the station is named in her honor. Billingstad opened as a staffed station on 3 March 1919. A year later it received a used station building from Skøyen Station. The line was electrified on 30 August 1922 and an interlocking system was installed on 18 October 1924.

The section of the Drammen Line between Sandvika Station and Asker Station was doubled between 1953 and 1958. As part of this work two sections of track were rerouted, including the segment just east of Billingstad Station. There the 372-meter (1,220 ft) Billingstad Tunnel was built. The double track from Billingstad to Hvalstad Station was the first to open, on 24 July 1953. The tunnel opened with one track on 6 September 1954 and the second on 29 November 1955. However, the segment of double track from Billingstad to Sandvika was not taken into regular use until 9 November 1958.

NSB Arkitektkontor carried out the design of the new station and Torolf Larsen was the architect for Billingstad. Similar to Hvalstad and Slependen, Billingstad was rebuilt as an elevated station with an underpass for traffic and access from below. The new station was taken into use in 1958.

The line past the station received automatic train stop and centralized traffic control on 12 and 14 December 1993, respectively. The station received axle counters instead of track circuits in 2012.

== Facilities ==
Billingstad Station is situated on the Drammen Line, 17.62 kilometers (10.95 mi) from Oslo Central Station at an elevation of 41.2 meters (135 ft) above mean sea level. The line past the station features double track. The station consists of a 220-meter (720 ft) long and 60-centimeter (24 in) tall island platform with two tracks and a shed. The station is elevated and situated over an underpass for road traffic, with access from below. The station building is built in polished concrete and covers the entire width of the platform – and is therefore located at the end. The location on a curve has given it the building a cuneate shape and a lean-on roof.

Billingstad is a mixed residential and commercial area. There are both areas of single dwellings and condominiums within the station's catchment area. In addition the area features a large commercial and industrial site, including an IKEA outlet and its Norwegian headquarters. As of 2008, there were 4,300 people living within 1.0-kilometer (0.62 mi) of the station and 3,600 jobs within the same area. The station has parking for 48 cars and a bicycle stand. There is a ticket vending machine and a taxi stand at the station.

== Service ==
Vy serves Billingstad with line L1 of the Oslo Commuter Rail. L1 calls at all stations, running from Spikkestad Station along the Spikkestad Line to Asker Station and past Slependen to Oslo Central Station. It then continues along the Trunk Line to Lillestrøm Station. Billingstad has two trains per direction per hour, which is scheduled to increase to four in late 2014. The station had about 900 daily passengers in 2008, and 250,000 annual passengers in 2012. Travel time to Oslo Central Station is 23 minutes.

== Bibliography ==
- Bjerke, Thor; Holom, Finn (2004). Banedata 2004 (in Norwegian). Hamar / Oslo: Norsk Jernbanemuseum / Norsk Jernbaneklubb. ISBN 82-90286-28-7.
- Hartmann, Eivind; Mangset, Øistein; Reisegg, Øyvind (1997). Neste stasjon (in Norwegian). Gyldendal. ISBN 82-05-25294-7.

Preceding station			Following station
Hvalstad	Drammen Line		Slependen
Preceding station	Local trains		Following station
Hvalstad	L1	Spikkestad–Oslo S–Lillestrøm	Slependen
