= Jong Station =

Railway station in Bærum, Norway

Jong

General information
- Location: Jong, Bærum; Norway
- Coordinates: 59°53′21″N 10°30′12″E
- Owner: Norwegian State Railways
- Line: Drammen Line
- Distance: 15.39 km (9.56 mi)
- Platforms: 2 side platforms
- Tracks: 2

Construction
- Structure type: At-grade

History
- Opened: 31 May 1959
- Closed: 23 May 1993
Location
- Location within Akershus

Jong Station (Norwegian: Jong holdeplass) was a railway station on the Drammen Line, located at Jong in Bærum, Norway. It served as a station for the Oslo Commuter Rail between 31 May 1959 and its closing on 23 May 1993. The station, situated 15.39 kilometers (9.56 mi) from Oslo Central Station, consisted of two side platforms.

Demands for a station were first articulated in the 1930s. During construction there arose a disagreement regarding the name, with the local residents' association preferring Jongsbru. In 1988 the railway proposed merging Jong with the old Slependen Station, with a new Slependen Station be built between the two.

== History ==
The Drammen Line past the site of Høvik Station opened as a narrow gauge railway on 7 October 1872. The area of Jong was at first served by Sandvika Station and from 1873 also by Slependen Station. The need for a station serving Jong was first articulated during the early 1930s by the manager of Fru Hjorts Pleiehjem, who served 300 patients and 60 employees at the nursing home. The residents' association for Jongåsen joined in on the effort through a letter to the Norwegian State Railways (NSB) in April 1935. They argued that some passengers taking the bus would switch to the train. They met with NSB' director the following year, without success. NSB responded that this would increase travel time for the trains, that it would be difficult to stop because of the hill and that it would be difficult to fit into the schedule.

The plans were revitalized during the 1950s. The naming of the station caused controversy, with the residents' association wanting the station to be called Jongsbru and NSB wanting it to be called Jong. The decision fell on the latter. Jong Station opened on 31 May 1959. Jong was located on the inner part of the Drammen Line and was served every half-hour by the Oslo Commuter Rail.

In 1988 NSB proposed merging the old Slependen Station and the station at Jong and replacing it with a new station in between. Both stations were in need of modernization. Among other issues, they were both 50 meters (160 ft) shorter than the norm of 220-meter (720 ft) platforms, and they were both situated in curves hindering sight lines. The merger would also make the line run faster. The new station was estimated to cost NOK 8.4 million. The new station was opened and Jong Station closed on 23 May 1993. The new station was located 430 meters (1,410 ft) from Jong Station.

== Facilities ==
Jong Station was located on the Drammen Line, 14.42 kilometers (8.96 mi) from Oslo West Station and 15.39 kilometers (9.56 mi) from Oslo Central Station. The line past the station featured double track and was equipped with two side platforms. It was situated in a mostly residential area. Jong Station was 790 meters (2,590 ft) from the old Slependen Station and 1,250 meters (4,100 ft) from Sandvika Station.

| Preceding station | | Following station |
|---|---|---|
| Slependen | Drammen Line | Sandvika |
