= Slependen =

Coordinates: 59°52′58″N 10°30′21″E

- Urban area
- Interactive map of Slependen
- Country: Norway
- City: Bærum
- County: Akershus

Area
  - Total: 15–19 km^{2} (5.8–7.3 sq mi)

Population (2012)
  - Total: 7 200
  - Density: 480/km^{2} (1,200/sq mi)
- Post Code: 1341

Slependen is a relatively large area in Bærum, Norway. On Slependen there is significant villa settlement, as well as considerable office and commercial activities. As of 2025, it has an approximate population of 7,940 residents.

== Building development ==
Slependen posed originally as an area across large parts of Asker and Bærum. In 1927, the area was split due to the different priorities of the two municipalities in terms of financial support. The area that belonged to Bærum, where the two larger farms Gyssestad and Hilton held to, was given the name Øvre Slependen Vel (Upper Slependen Well area). Gyssestad farm was bought and taken over by the municipality of Bærum in 1950, but is today completely downsized.

The original municipal boundary was a stream of Åsløkka in Hilton hill that ran out in Slependbukta.

Road construction in the area has taken a lot of the earth and residential construction started early. A popular area is Åsløkkveien, from where there are views of Oslofjorden.

After one of the stations on the Drammen Line was named Slependen, the name has been linked to an increasingly bigger area. From a historical perspective, today's Slependen Station can hardly be said to lie on Slependen, or serve the area which is traditionally called Slependen.

== Business and industry ==
Along with Billingstadsletta in Asker, which partly is considered to be a part of Slependen, Slependen is one of Asker and Bærum most business-influenced places. It has also, in recent years, become a hot spot for restaurants due to its proximity to Sandvika.

== Culture ==
By Slependen station it is a lime kiln for calcination from 1914. The oven's exterior was restored in 1982 and the interior in 1994. The oven is open for tours and exhibition, "Lime Burning in Asker and Bærum". Lime burning was a significant source of income in Bærum and Asker in the past, and a lime kiln are therefore illustrated in Bærums coat of arms.

The Norwegian Royal Palace was built with limestone from Bærum, which probably originates from Slependen. This is also the case with Akershus fortress and the medieval churches at Tanum and Haslum.
