= Sandvika Station =

Railway station in Bærum, Norway

Sandvika
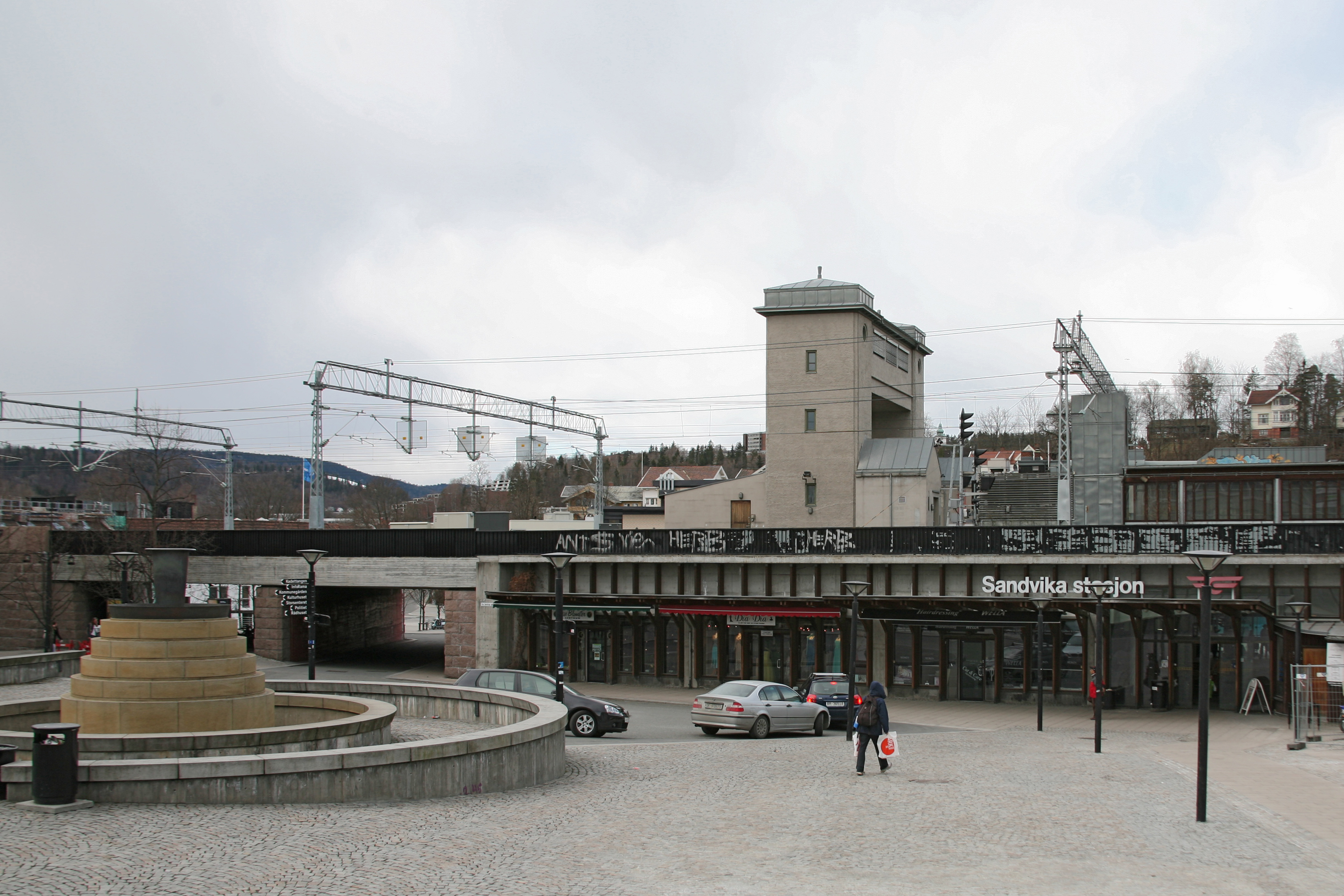

General information
- Location: Folangerveien; Sandvika, Bærum; Norway
- Coordinates: 59°53′34″N 10°31′32″E
- Elevation: 12.0 m (39.4 ft)
- Owner: Bane NOR
- Operator: Airport Express Train; Go-Ahead Norge; Vy
- Lines: Asker Line; Drammen Line
- Distance: 14.14 km (8.79 mi) from Oslo S
- Platforms: 2 island platforms
- Tracks: 4
- Connections: Bus: Ruter

Construction
- Structure type: Elevated
- Parking: Yes
- Cycle facilities: Yes
- Architect: Georg Andreas Bull (1872); Gudmund Hoel (1919); Arne Henriksen (1994)

Other information
- Station code: SV
- Fare zone: 2V

History
- Opened: 7 October 1872
- Rebuilt: 1919, 1993

Passengers
- 2008: 7,000
Location
- Location within Akershus

Sandvika Station (Norwegian: Sandvika stasjon) is a railway station located at Sandvika in Bærum, Norway. Situated on the Drammen Line, 14.14 kilometers (8.79 mi) from Oslo S, it also an intermediate station of the Asker Line. Vy serves the station with local and regional, with about 7,000 passengers using the station daily. It is also served by the Airport Express Train and serves as the main bus terminal for the town. The station is elevated and has two island platforms and four tracks.

The station opened along with the Drammen Line on 7 October 1872, until 1922 being named Sandviken. The original station building was designed by Georg Andreas Bull in Swiss chalet style. The station underwent a renewal from 1917 to 1922, receiving gauge conversion to standard gauge, electrification. A new station building designed by Gudmund Hoel opened in 1919. The tracks east of the station were doubled in 1922, the line westwards in 1958. A new, four-track station building opened in 1994, designed by Arne Henriksen. The Asker Line opened in two stages, in 2005 and 2011.

== History ==
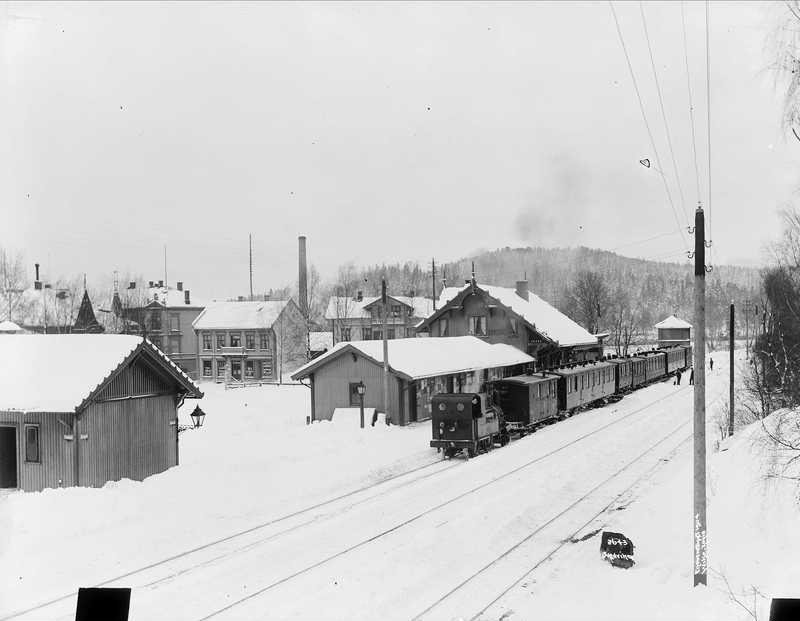
Sandvika Station in 1904

Construction of the Drammen Line was passed by Parliament on 16 June 1869. As one of the municipalities through which the railway was to run, Bærum was expected to buy shares in the railway company. Of the total cost of 1.6 million Norwegian speciedaler, the municipalities had to buy for 260,000. Bærum bought shares for 2000 speciedaler, but was unable to pay all its dues. It therefore borrowed the money from its midwife fund and issued a new tax of 8 shillings per house to finance it.

Bærum Municipal Council was asked where it wanted the station placed. There was consensus to establish one in Sandvika, although there was disagreement regarding the placement of the other. The council finally voted in favor of building Lysaker Station. To build the station the former shop of Shoemaker Jakobsen had to be demolished. The railway paid 254 specidaler in expropriation. A station building was built, designed by Georg Andreas Bull. Originally named Sandviken Station, it and the Drammen Line opened on 7 October 1872, as a narrow gauge railway. Travel time from Sandvika to Oslo West Station (Oslo V) was originally 27 minutes.

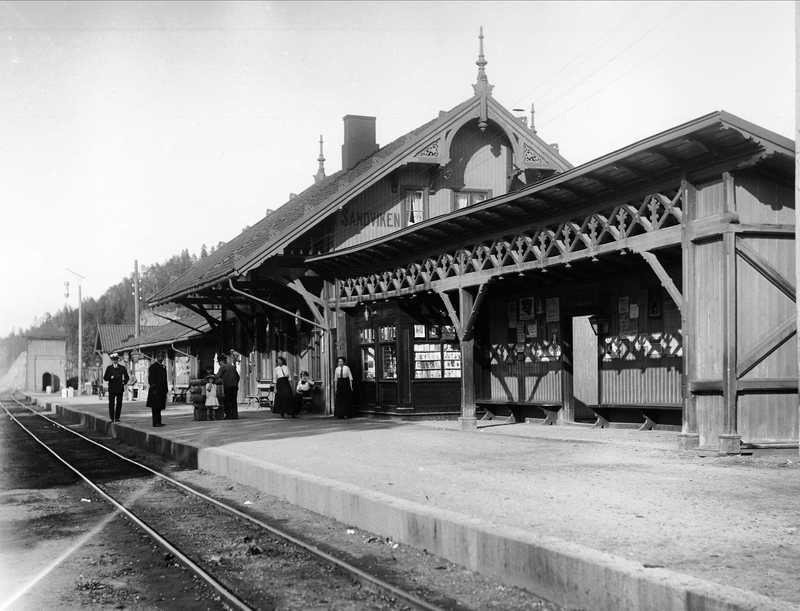
Sandvika Station in 1912

The arrival of the railway had a dramatic impact on Sandvika. First of all is spurred the centralization of many commercial activities in Sandvika, with the subsequent increase to population. Secondly the line cut through the town. This creased a social divide, with workers and craftsmen settling north of the station, and the bourgeois settling on the south side, along the fjord. The railway also brought some tourism with people on day trips from Oslo.

The line from Sandvika to Oslo was substantially upgraded between 1917 and 1922. As part of this a new station building was built, designed by Gudmund Hoel at NSB Arkitektkontor. The new station was designed in Baroque Revival architecture and opened in 1919. The two-story building featured a waiting room with benches along the walls, a ticket office, a freight office, a kiosk and washrooms. The upper floor was an apartment for the station master. The building had details in natural stone.

The old station building became a residence and a freight-handling facility. All–standard gauge operations commenced on 9 February 1920, although the dual gauge was not removed until 1922. Electric traction started operation on 30 August 1922. An interlocking system was installed on 6 October 1924. From 1922 a half-hour headway was introduced on local trains between Sandvika and Oslo. The station took its current name on 1 October 1922.

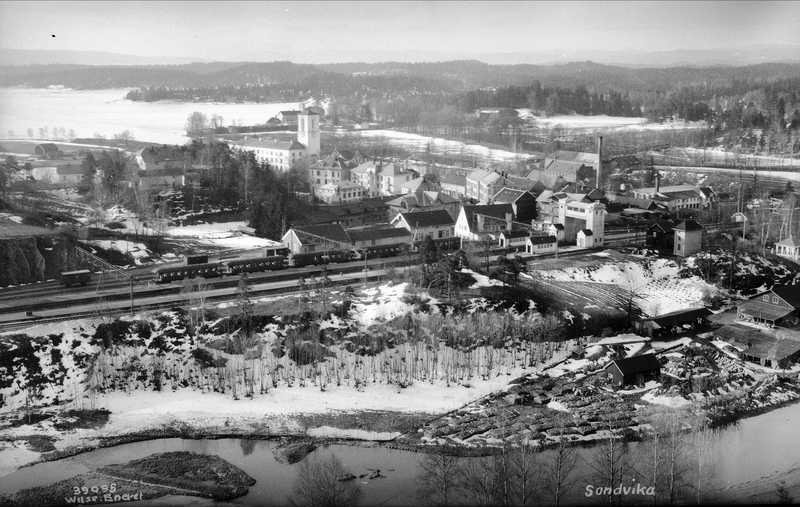
Sandvika Station in 1933

The segment of the Drammen Line between Sandvika and Asker was converted to double track between 1955 and 1958, with the section from Billingstad Station to Sandvika completed on 9 November 1958. As part of this work new tracks were built at Sandvika and the cargo division expanded. A new building for ticket sales and a waiting room was erected between tracks 3 and 4 in 1961. From 1981, with the opening of the Oslo Tunnel, most trains serving Sandvika started running through the Oslo Tunnel to Oslo Central Station. In December 1988 the municipality bought the old cargo facility at Kjøbo for 27 million Norwegian krone. The structure was demolished and made way for a new bus terminal as part of the new station project. The line past the station received centralized traffic control and automatic train stop on 3 December 1992.

In 1991 NSB decided to build a new station in Sandvika and chose Arne Henriksen's design. The station saw the tracks raised through Sandvika, allowing the town to be freed from the bonds of a railway running through it. Work was combined with the construction of a new bus terminal and a parking garage. In addition to increasing capacity, the goal was also to make Sandvika a more attractive site to travel through. NSB hoped that the new station would contribute to make Sandvika "softer". This saw the road past the station closed for traffic, shorter transfer distance between trains and buses. Construction commenced in late 1991. A controversy arose over the fate of Hoel's station building. Several locals wanted to preserve the building, but it was in the way for the design of the new station. Both it and the platform building from 1961 were demolished. The Airport Express Train started services on 27 September 1998.

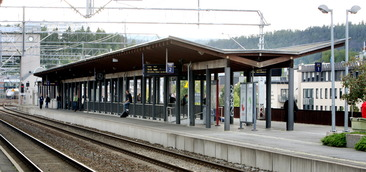
Platform superstructure

The Asker Line was built to allow regional trains to bypass local trains on the Drammen Line, increasing both capacity, speed and regularity through the West Corridor. The first segment was the section from Asker to Sandvika, which started in 2001 and was opened on 27 August 2005. Construction of the second stage, from Sandvika to Lysaker, commenced in 2007 and it was opened on 26 August 2011. The Asker Line allows trains to bypass all intermediate stations along the Drammen Line between Asker and Lysaker, while still stopping at Sandvika. In addition to faster travel times, it allows the West Corridor eleven more departures per direction per hour.

== Facilities ==
Sandvika Station is situated on the Drammen and Asker Lines, at a distance of 14.14 kilometers (8.79 mi) from Oslo Central Station at an elevation of 12.0 meters (39.4 ft) above mean sea level. The outer tracks at the station are connected to the Asker Line and the inner tracks to the Drammen Line. However, there are switches allowing crossover. To the west of the station the four tracks run parallel over a bridge. At about the site of the closed Jong Station the Asker Line runs into each their own tube of the Tanum Tunnel while the Drammen Line continues at grade. To the east a similar track arrangement is followed allowing the Asker Line access to the Bærum Tunnel. The Asker Line has a speed limit of 160 kilometers per hour (99 mph), but this speed is limited to 80 km/h (50 mph) past Sandvika because of a curve in the arrangement west of the station.

The station is elevated and located centrally in Sandvika. The station building is built under the tracks and acts as a common waiting room for both bus and train passengers. Also part of the facility is a parking garage with place for 300 cars. The station has two island platforms and four tracks. The platforms are 230 and 240 meters (750 and 790 ft) long, respectively, and 70 centimeters (28 in) tall. The platforms are universally accessible from street level, but the platforms are 7 centimeters (2.8 in) too low to allow step-free access to the trains. Track 1 is to the north and 4 to the south, with eastbound trains stopping at the island platform with tracks 3 and 4. Tracks 1 and 4 normally serve trains along the Asker Line, while track 2 and 3 serve trains along the Drammen Line.

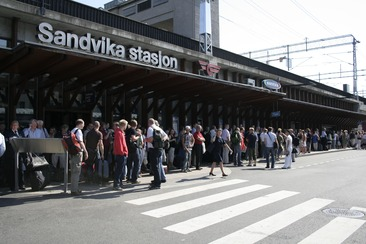
Entrance from the square

Akershus Kollektivterminaler operates a bus terminal at the station. The station is not staffed, but is equipped with ticket vending machines and features and indoor waiting room and kiosk. All platforms are covered. The station features locked bicycle parking, a taxi stand, and nearby parking garage.

The original station building had an unusual design in that it had a common entrance for passengers from the port side through a door situated below an veranda. It further featured a lean-on roof held up with console-supported columns. The wooden building was detailed with intricate carpentry work. The ground floor consisted of a first and second-class waiting room and associated offices for the railway. Bull's station is preserved and listed as a heritage site along with the interlocking building from 1923. The latter was designed by Bjarne F. Baastad and is unique in Norway in that it was building upon two towers with a central section over the tracks. The concrete building is now used for elevators.

== Services ==
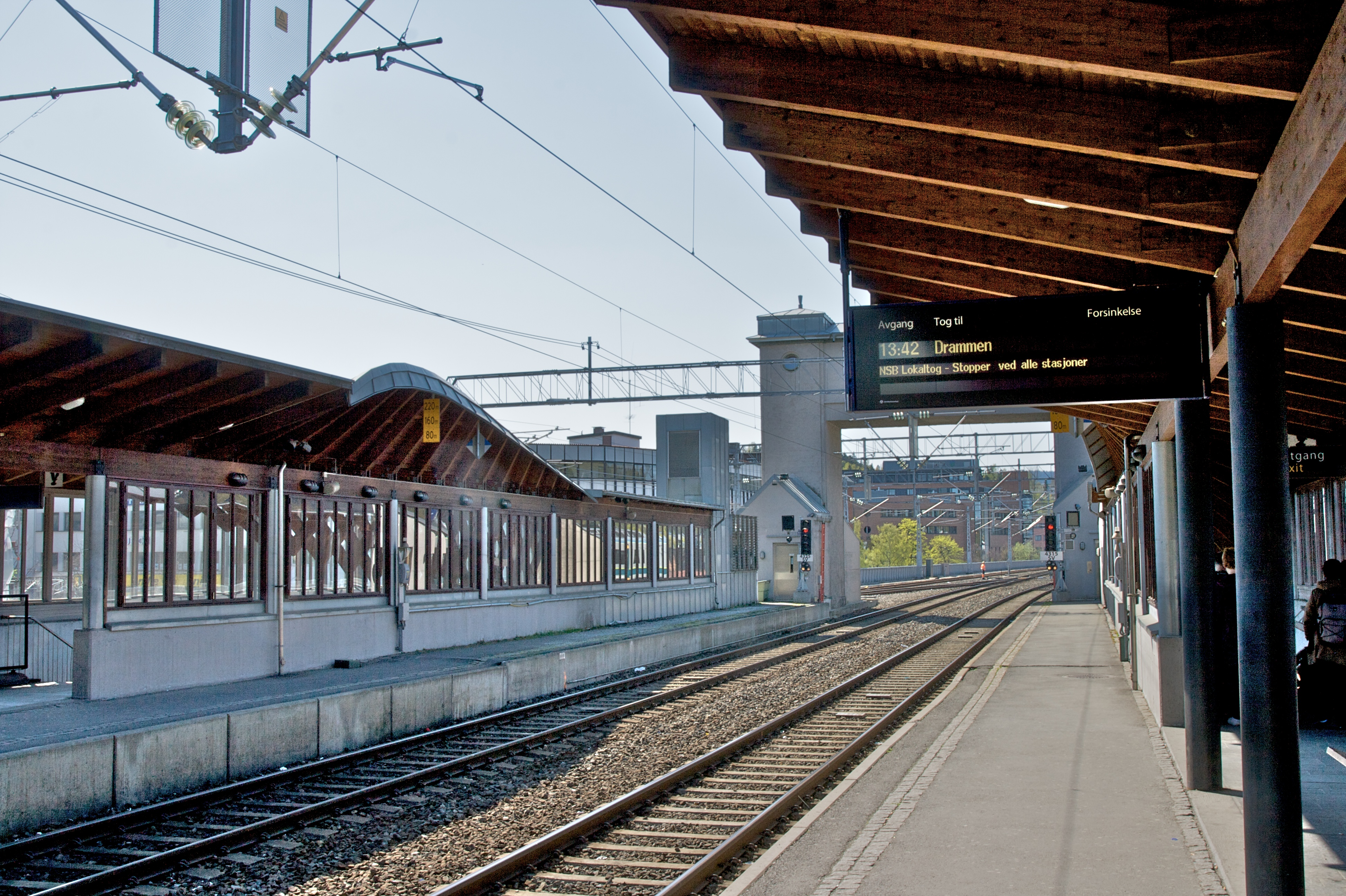
The platforms

Vy serves Asker Station both with Oslo Commuter Rail trains as well as regional trains. The commuter L1 service runs from Spikkestad Station past Sandvika on the Drammen Line and onwards to Oslo S and to Lillestrøm Station, calling at all stations. There are NSB services which run along the Asker Line to Oslo S: L12, L13, L14 and R10. These variously continue eastwards along the Gardermoen Line, the Trunk Line and the Kongsvinger Line. Westwards they run to Drammen Station, some continuing on the Vestfold Line and others on the Sørlandet Line. Travel time to Oslo S is 15 minutes along the Asker Line. NSB had 7,000 an average daily passengers to and from Sandvika in 2008.

The Airport Express Train runs every 20 minutes to Oslo Airport, Gardermoen. Local transport is organized by Ruter, who has Sandvika in fare zone 2A. Sandvika Station acts as the main bus terminal for Sandvika.

== Future ==
The government is working on plans to build the Ringerike Line, a 40-kilometer (25 mi) extension of the Bergen Line from Hønefoss which is planned to connect to the Asker Line at Sandvika Station. It would allow 50 minutes shorter travel time between Hønefoss and Sandvika. The Kolsås Line of the Oslo Metro runs through Bærum, terminating at Kolsås. There are plans to extend this line to Rykkinn and possibly a branch to Sandvika Station.

== Bibliography ==
- Bjerke, Thor; Holom, Finn (2004). Banedata 2004 (in Norwegian). Hamar / Oslo: Norsk Jernbanemuseum / Norsk Jernbaneklubb. ISBN 82-90286-28-7.
- Hartmann, Eivind; Mangset, Øistein; Reisegg, Øyvind (1997). Neste stasjon (in Norwegian). Gyldendal. ISBN 82-05-25294-7.
- Jacobsen, Jacob (1979). Sandvika – i Bærum (in Norwegian). Bærum: Kulturstyret i Bærum.
- Sars, Michael; Nordheim, Reidar (1974). Stabekk – En historikk (in Norwegian). Bærum: Vestre Stabekk Vel.
- Wisting, Tor (2002). Høvik Vel 100 år (in Norwegian). Bærum: Høvik Vel.
- Wøllo, Knut (1996). 100 år i Sandviken. Bærum: Selskabet til Sandvikens Vel.
- Wøllo, Knut (2006). Sandvika – fra tettsted til by – en billedkavalkade. Bærum: Selskabet til Sandvikens Vel. ISBN 978-82-303-0619-2.

Preceding station	Express trains		Following station
Asker	F4	Bergen–Oslo S	Oslo S
Preceding station	Regional trains		Following station
Asker	RE10	Drammen–Oslo S–Lillehammer	Lysaker
Asker	RE11	Skien–Oslo S–Eidsvoll	Lysaker
Preceding station	Flytoget		Following station
Asker towards Drammen		FLY1	Lysaker towards Oslo Airport, Gardemoen
Preceding station	Local trains		Following station
Slependen	L1	Spikkestad–Oslo S–Lillestrøm	Blommenholm
Asker	R12	Kongsberg–Oslo S–Eidsvoll	Lysaker
Asker	R13	Drammen–Oslo S–Dal	Lysaker
Asker	R14	Asker–Oslo S–Kongsvinger	Lysaker
