= Akershus Kollektivterminaler =

Norwegian bus operator

Akershus Kollektivterminaler FKF
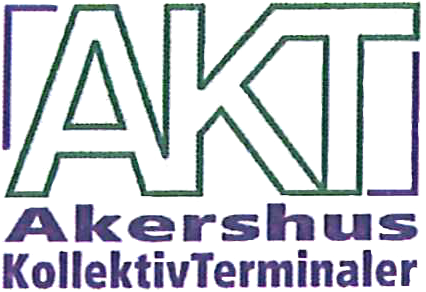

Agency overview
- Formed: 1999
- Jurisdiction: Akershus
- Headquarters: Lillestrøm, Norway
- Annual budget: 35 million kr
- Website: www.akt.as

Akershus Kollektivterminaler FKF is a county agency responsible for owning and operating major bus terminals in Akershus, Norway. It is a subsidiary of Akershus County Municipality, and operates 19 bus terminals, in addition to some adjacent park and ride facilities. The agency is responsible for all bus terminals with seven or more bus stops, and those in conjunction with railway stations. Smaller terminals and bus stops are operated by the Norwegian Public Roads Administration. The largest terminal is Oslo Bus Terminal, located in the heart of the city center, and owned by the subsidiary Vaterland Bussterminal. The agency has an annual revenue of 35 million kr.

== Terminals ==
Image	Terminal	Municipality	Connection
	Asker	Asker	Regional- and express trains Oslo Commuter Rail; Airport Express Train
	Bekkestua	Bærum	Oslo Metro
	Eidsvoll Verk	Eidsvoll	Oslo Commuter Rail
	Eidsvoll	Eidsvoll	Oslo Commuter Rail
	Gardermoen	Ullensaker	Oslo Airport, Gardermoen; Regional- and express trains Oslo Commuter Rail; Airport Express Train
	Kløfta	Ullensaker	Oslo Commuter Rail
	Lillestrøm	Skedsmo	Regional- and express trains Oslo Commuter Rail; Airport Express Train
	Leirsund	Skedsmo	Oslo Commuter Rail
	Lysaker	Bærum	Oslo Commuter Rail; Airport Express Train
	Nannestad	Nannestad	
	Nesodden	Nesodden	Nesodden–Bundefjord Dampskipsselskap
	Oslo	Oslo	Oslo Central Station; Jernbanetorget (tramway and T-bane)
	Sandvika	Bærum	Regional- and express trains Oslo Commuter Rail; Airport Express Train
	Ski	Ski	Regional- and express trains Oslo Commuter Rail
	Solheim	Lørenskog	
	Sørumsand	Sørum	Oslo Commuter Rail
	Strømmen	Skedsmo	Oslo Commuter Rail
	Årnes	Nes	Oslo Commuter Rail
	Ås	Ås	Oslo Commuter Rail
