= Arne Henriksen =

Norwegian architect (born 1944)

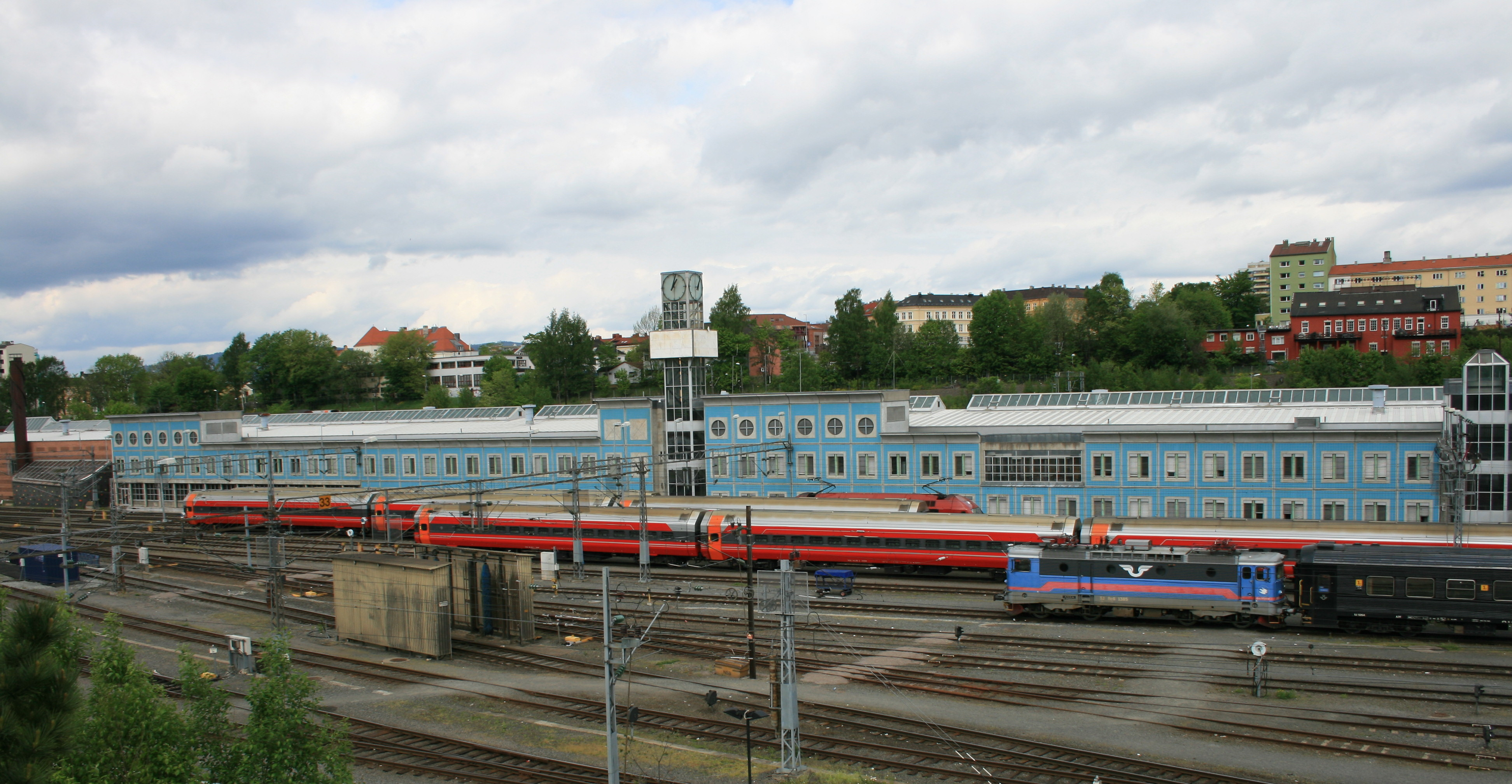
- Railway carriage shed at Lodalen, Oslo
- Born: 26 February 1944 (age 82); Søndre Land Municipality, Oppland
- Occupation: Architect

Arne Henriksen (born 26 February 1944) is a Norwegian architect who has designed many Norwegian railway stations. He worked at NSB Arkitektkontor from 1975 til 1989, and thereafter in private practice. He is a three-time winner of the Houen Fund Certificate for outstanding architecture, awarded by the National Association of Norwegian Architects.

== Stations he designed ==
- Holmlia Station (1982)
- Frognerseteren Station (1993)
- Slependen Station (1993)
- Lillestrøm Station (1998)
