= Billingstad =

- Village
- Location in Akershus
- Coordinates: 59°52′29″N 10°28′59″E
- Country: Norway
- Region: Østlandet
- County: Akershus
- Municipality: Asker
- Time zone: UTC+01:00 (CET)
  - Summer (DST): UTC+02:00 (CEST)

Billingstad is a village in Asker municipality, Akershus county, Norway. It is close to the border of Bærum and Vestmarka and is 18 km west of Oslo. It has 2,349 residents (2006).

The area is both residential and commercial. It is served by the Oslo Commuter Rail at Billingstad Station, and hosts the world's first IKEA outside Sweden. Both Budstikka and Varner-Gruppen have their head offices at Billingstad.
