= Drammen Station =

Railway station in Buskerud, Norway

Drammen
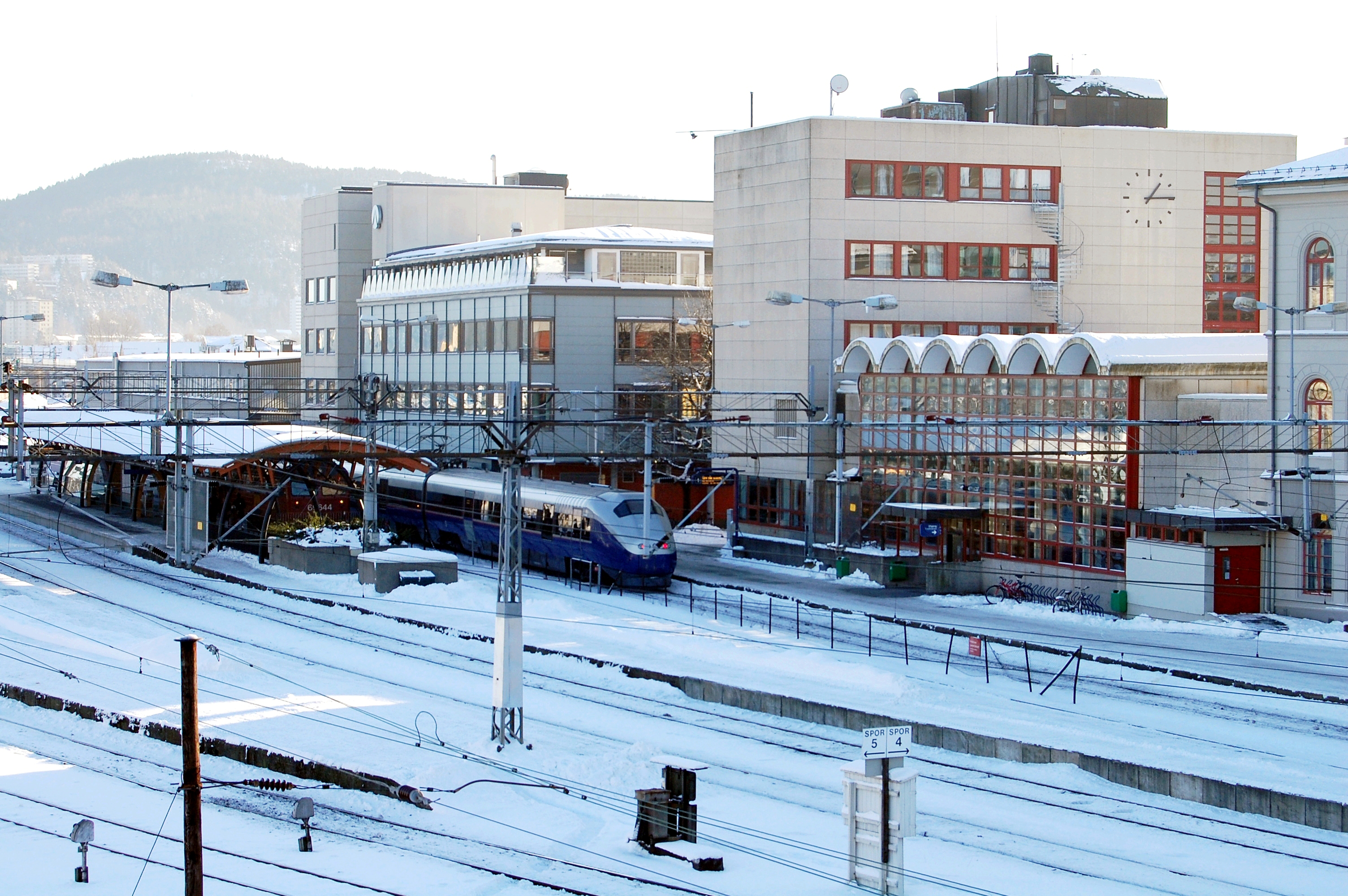
- Drammen Station with a Class 73 unit

General information
- Location: Downtown, Drammen; Norway
- Coordinates: 59°44′24″N 10°12′16″E
- Elevation: 2.2 m (7 ft 3 in)
- Owner: Bane NOR
- Operator: Flytoget; Go-Ahead Norge; Vy
- Lines: Drammen Line; Sørlandet Line; Vestfold Line
- Distance: 52.86 km

Construction
- Architect: Georg Andreas Bull

Other information
- Station code: DRM

History
- Opened: 15 November 1866
Location

Drammen Station (Drammen stasjon) is a railway station located in downtown Drammen in Buskerud, Norway.

== History ==
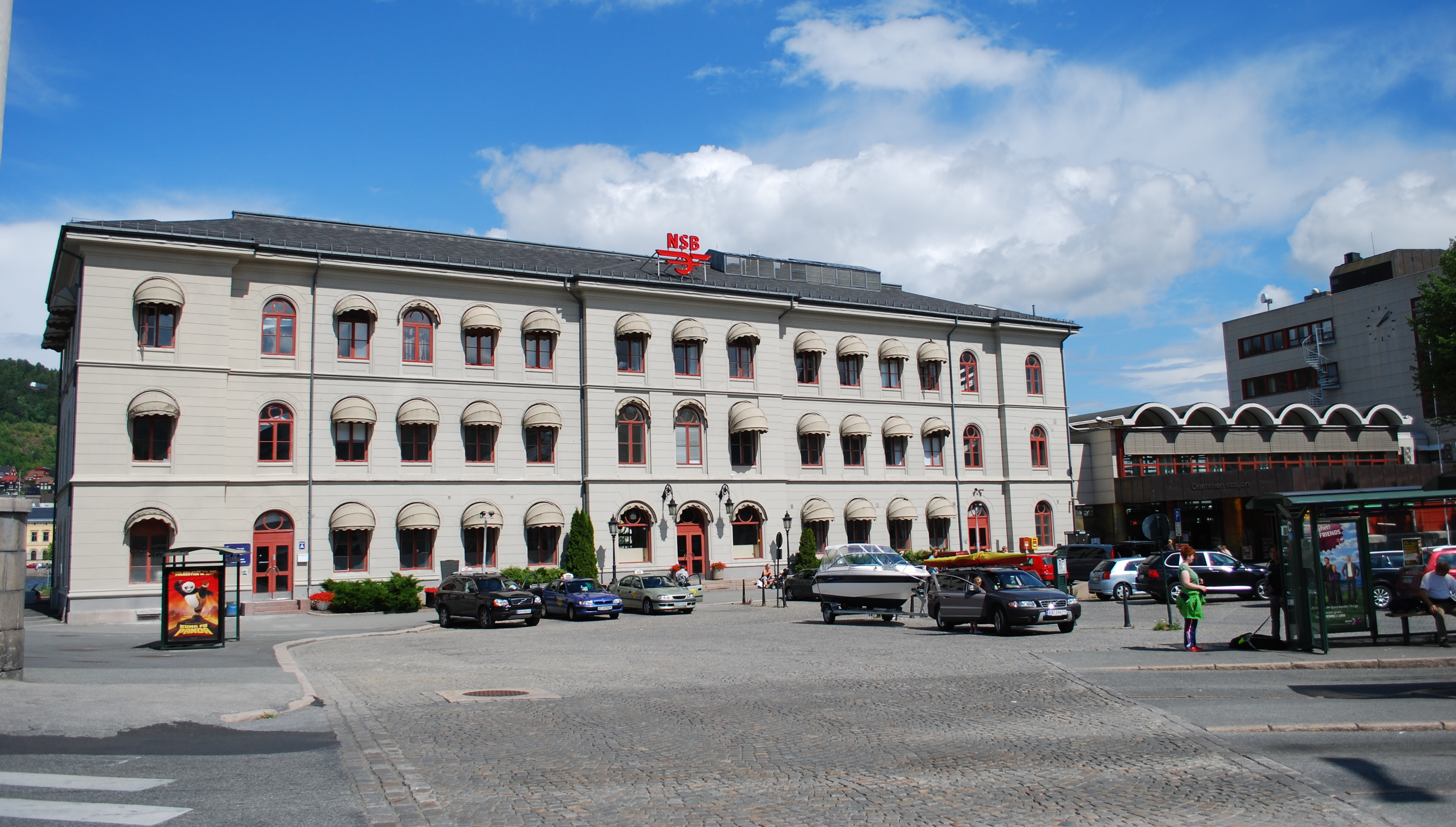
Drammen Station

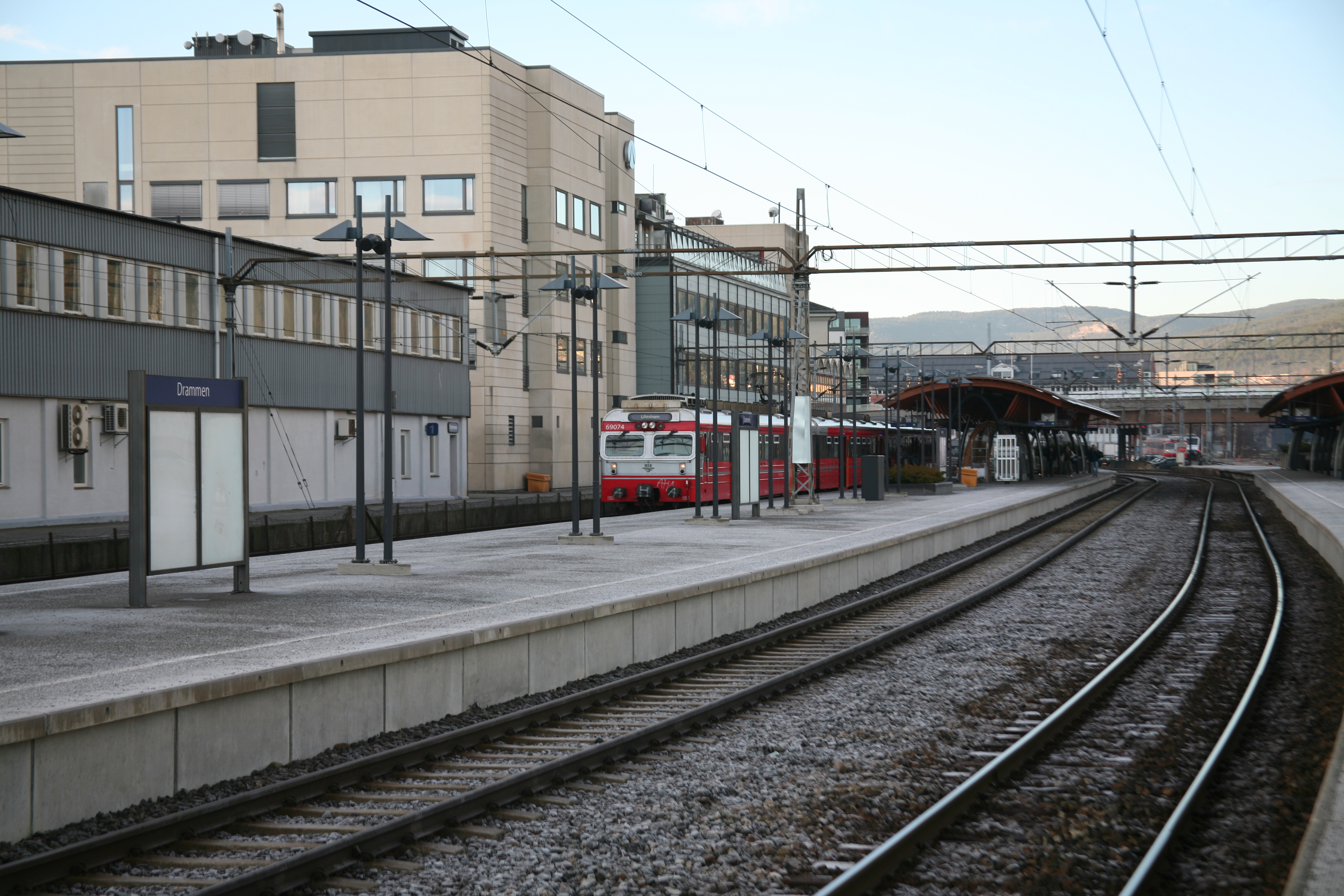
Class 69 train at Drammen Station

Drammen Station was first opened in 1866 in Conjunction with the opening of the Randsfjorden Line. The station is the terminus of the Sørlandet Line, the Drammen Line and the Vestfold Line.

The station is served by the Oslo Commuter Rail to Oslo, Kongsberg and Eidsvoll, regional trains on the Vestfold Line and express trains to Bergen on the Bergen Line and to Kristiansand on the Sørlandet Line. From 20 August 2009, the station became the terminus of the Airport Express Train.

Preceding station	Express trains		Following station
Hokksund	F4	Bergen–Oslo S	Asker
Kongsberg	F5	Stavanger-Kristiansand–Oslo S	Asker
Preceding station	Regional trains		Following station
—	RE10	Drammen–Oslo S–Lillehammer	Asker
Sande	RE11	Skien–Oslo S–Eidsvoll	Asker
Preceding station	Flytoget		Following station
Terminus		FLY1	Asker towards Oslo Airport, Gardemoen
Preceding station	Local trains		Following station
Gulskogen	R12	Kongsberg–Oslo S–Eidsvoll	Asker
—	R13	Drammen–Oslo S–Dal	Brakerøya
