= Asker station =

Railway station in Asker, Norway

Asker
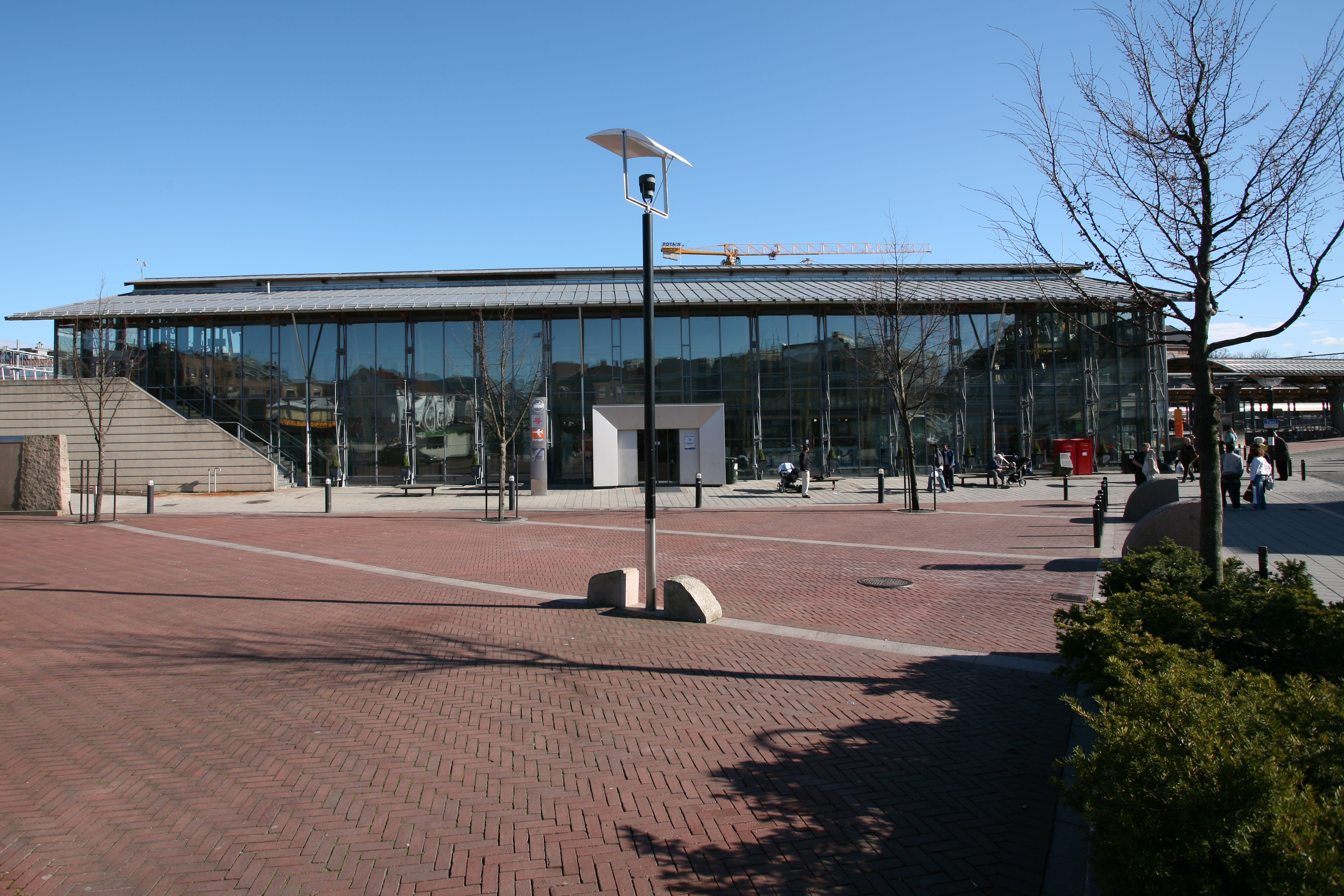

General information
- Location: Torvveien 4, Asker; Norway
- Coordinates: 59°50′1″N 10°26′4″E
- Elevation: 104.6 m (343 ft)
- Owner: Bane NOR
- Operator: Flytoget; Go-Ahead Norge; Vy
- Lines: Asker Line; Drammen Line; Spikkestad Line
- Distance: 23.83 km (14.81 mi)
- Platforms: 2 island, 2 side
- Tracks: 6
- Connections: Bus: Ruter 75, 280, 270, 281,275, 260, 285, 291, 293, 294, 296, 297

Construction
- Parking: 544 places
- Accessible: yes

Other information
- Station code: ASR
- Fare zone: 2V

History
- Opened: October 7, 1872

Passengers
- 2008: 8,400 (daily)
Location
- Location within Akershus

Asker Station (Norwegian: Asker stasjon) is a railway station located in downtown Asker, Norway. Situated on the Drammen Line, 23.83 kilometers (14.81 mi) from Oslo Central Station, it also serves as the terminus of the Asker Line and the Spikkestad Line. The station is located just southwest of the Asker Tunnel and the Skaugum Tunnel, and just northeast of the Lieråsen Tunnel. Vy serves the station with local, regional and intercity trains. It is also served by the Airport Express Train and serves as the main bus terminal for the town. The station has six tracks and four platforms, consisting of two island platforms and two side platforms. The station had 8,400 daily passengers in 2008.

The station opened along with the Drammen Line on 7 October 1872. The original station building was designed by Georg Andreas Bull in Swiss chalet style. The station underwent a renewal from 1917 to 1922, receiving gauge conversion to standard gauge, electrification and a new station building designed by Ragnvald Utne. Double track was laid from 1955 to 1958, including building the Asker Tunnel just northeast of the station, and a new station building opened in 1960. The Lieråsen Tunnel opened in 1973, cutting the distance to Drammen, and resulted in the old line becoming the Spikkestad Line. The station received an overhaul in 1998 and again in 2006. The latter was in conjunction with the construction of the Asker Line.

== History ==
=== Construction and initial station ===
The first public transport between Asker and Christiania (Oslo) commenced in 1866, when a ferry would was started up. The decision to build the Drammen Line was taken by Parliament on 16 June 1869. Ground on the farm of Fusdal was selected for the station to serve Asker.

The first station building was designed by Georg Andreas Bull. Known as the Asker Class, a similar design was used for another eleven train stations on the Drammen- and Randsfjorden Lines. The original station building was among the most spacious and elaborate for its size category. Built in Swiss chalet style, it featured a saddle roof and was split between a public area and a residence for the station master. Unusual for stations at the time the residential door was on the front, rather than the side, of the building. The station was decorated in fretsaw ornaments in organic and Gothic styles.

The line and Asker Station opened on 7 October 1872. From 1875 Asker Station had four employees: a station master, a telegraphist and two carriers. The station served 17,466 passengers that year, rising to 33,851 in 1900. Travel time from Asker to Oslo West Station was about an hour. The arrival of the railway in Asker resulted in city dwellers buying or renting holiday homes in Asker. There was at first little settlements around the station, but as it generated traffic the interest for the area grew through the 1870s. Soon the neighborhood's general store moved to the vicinity of the station. A Narvesen kiosk opened at the station at about the turn of the century. Growth was gradual. From 1910 Statistics Norway registered Asker Station as a settlement, with 20 building and 184 residents.

=== Standard gauge ===
The traffic on the line rose quickly. Within a few decades the Drammen Line was serving the Vestfold Line, the Randsfjorden Line and the Sørlandet Line. The line was soon found to be underdimensioned and delays were common. To meet the higher traffic levels, a major upgrade of the Drammen Line was carried out from 1917 to 1922. For Asker this involved gauge conversion from narrow to standard gauge and electrification. The segment from Asker to Sandvika was converted to dual gauge on 15 December 1918. This arrangement of a mix of standard and narrow gauge rolling stock lasted until 13 November 1922, from which time only standard gauge stock was used. Meanwhile, the line was also electrified, which was taken into use on 26 November 1922.

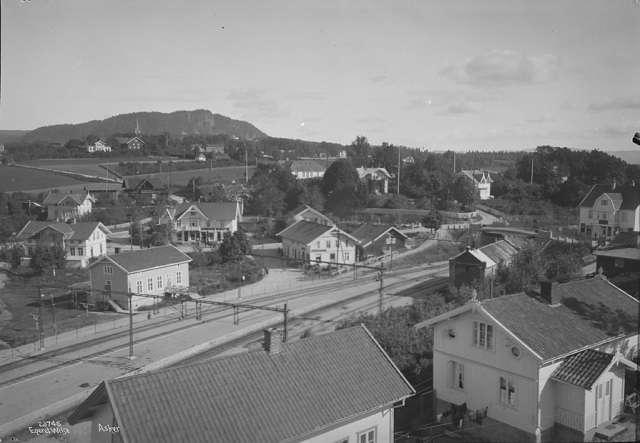
Asker Station in 1923

As part of the upgrade to the line an all-new station building was built at Asker. Designed by Ragnvald Utne at NSB Arkitektkontor, it was completed in 1921. During the first decades of the twentieth century the number of commuters into Oslo grew rapidly. In 1890 there were only five people with month or yearly passes commuting to Oslo, while this rose to 432 in 1930. By 1939 there were two bus services corresponding with the trains at Asker: one to Slemmestad and one to Dikemark and no:Vardåsen.

Construction of double track between Asker and Sandvika was carried out between 1953 and 1958. The second segment, from a point north of the Asker Tunnel to Hvalstad Station opened on 29 November 1955. The new Asker Tunnel, located immediately northwest of the station, opened on 8 December 1958, completing the new segment of double track. The tunnel was taken into use in two steps: the one track on 8 October and the second on 8 December. In conjunction with this a new station was built, designed by NSB Arkitektkontor and opened in 1960.

=== Tunnels ===
The Lieråsen Tunnel was built to allow double track to Drammen and cut the route west of Asker by 12.4 kilometers (7.7 mi). Construction started in 1963, but the tunnel was delayed due to geological challenges and opened on 3 June 1973. The old section of track from Asker to Spikkestad was kept and became the Spikkestad Line. With the opening of the tunnel the local train routes were rearranged, so that there were two trains from Asker to Oslo each hour and one train each hour to Spikkestad and Drammen, respectively. These served all stations from Asker to Sandvika and then ran directly to Oslo.

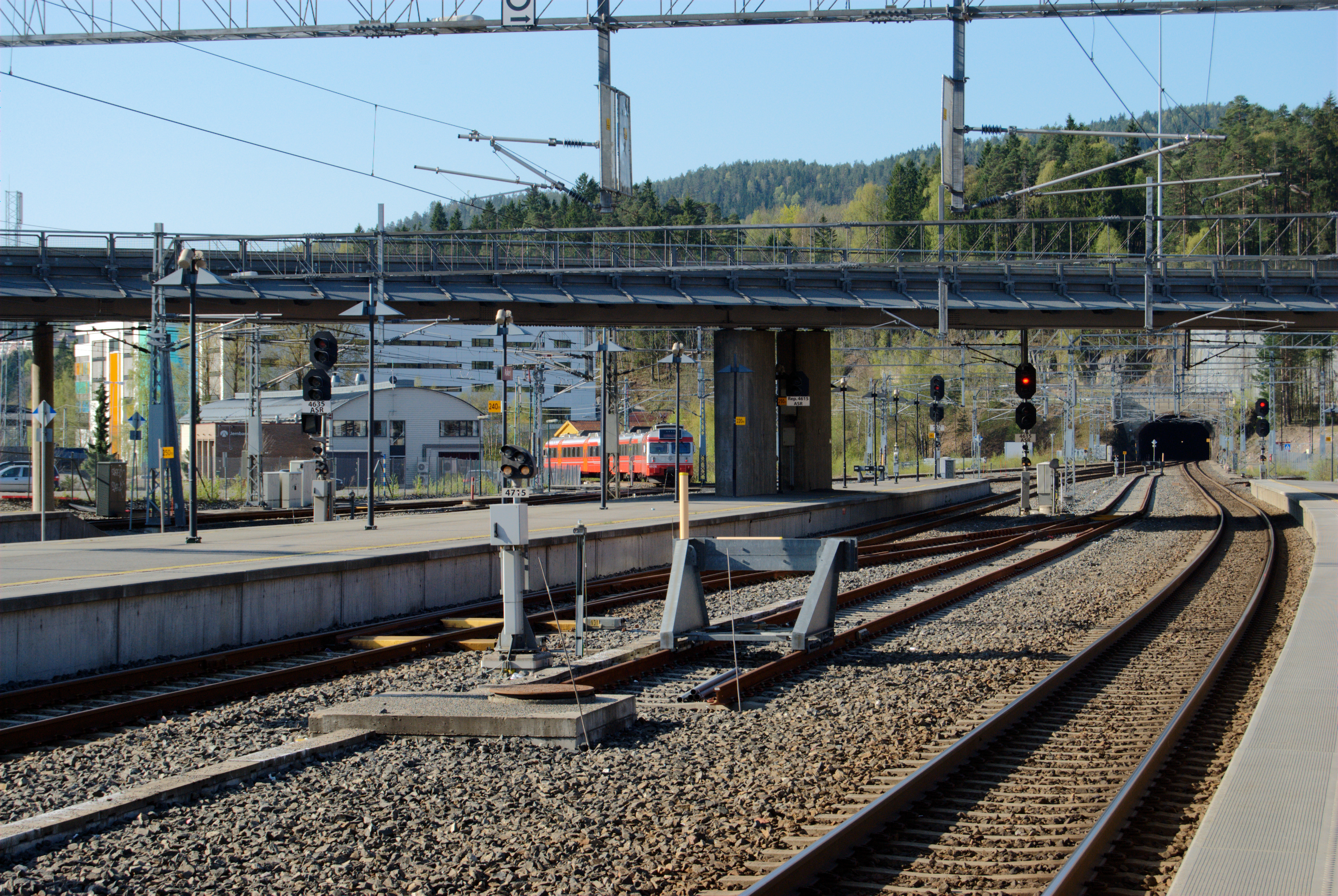
Class 69 train heading off on the Spikkestad Line, with the Lieråsen Tunnel to the right

Stor-Oslo Lokaltrafikk took over operations of the bus routes in Asker from 1 January 1975 and started to feed the bus services to Asker Station rather than drive directly downtown. From mid 1984 NSB terminated express train stops at Asker, but these returned the following year. The old station at Asker burned down on 24 June 1992. The section from Asker to Drammen received centralized traffic control with the opening of the Lieråsen Tunnel, while the section from Asker to Sandvika did not receive this until 14 December 1993. Automatic train stop was introduced from Asker to Drammen on 1 June 1987, while the segment from Asker to Sandvika received it on 12 December 1993.

Planning of a new station design started in the early 1990s, originally with focus on developing it as a renewal project to make the town center in Asker more attractive. It kept the existing station building, but it was significantly upgraded in a design by Niels Torp. The underpass was closed and replaced with an overpass, and the new station received five tracks. The upgrades were timed to allow the station to act as the terminus for the Airport Express Train, which commenced services that year. The work also saw the construction of a new parking house.

The Asker Line was built to allow regional trains to bypass local trains on the Drammen Line, increasing both capacity, speed and regularity through the West Corridor. The first segment was the section from Asker to Sandvika, which started in 2001 and was opened on 27 August 2005. Upgrades of Asker Station were carried out from 2002. It involved both upgrades to the station itself and construction of a 130-meter (430 ft) culvert acting as the entrance to the Skaugum Tunnel. The station was rebuilt from five to six tracks. Construction was carried out in such a way that four tracks were at any time kept in operation, starting from the east and working westwards.

== Facilities ==
Asker Station is situated on the Drammen Line, at a distance of 23.83 kilometers (14.81 mi) from Oslo Central Station at an elevation of 104.6 meters (343 ft) above mean sea level. The station is the terminus of two other lines: it is the southwestern terminus of the double-tracked Asker Line and the northeastern terminus of the single-tracked Spikkestad Line. To the northeast of the station all tracks run into a twin-tubed tunnel, one tube which is the 416-meter (1,365 ft) Asker Tunnel on the Drammen Line. The other is the 3.5-kilometer (2.2 mi) Skaugum Tunnel of the Asker Line. To the southwest the main tracks on the Drammen Line run into the Lieråsen Tunnel, while the Spikkestad Line branches off to the south.

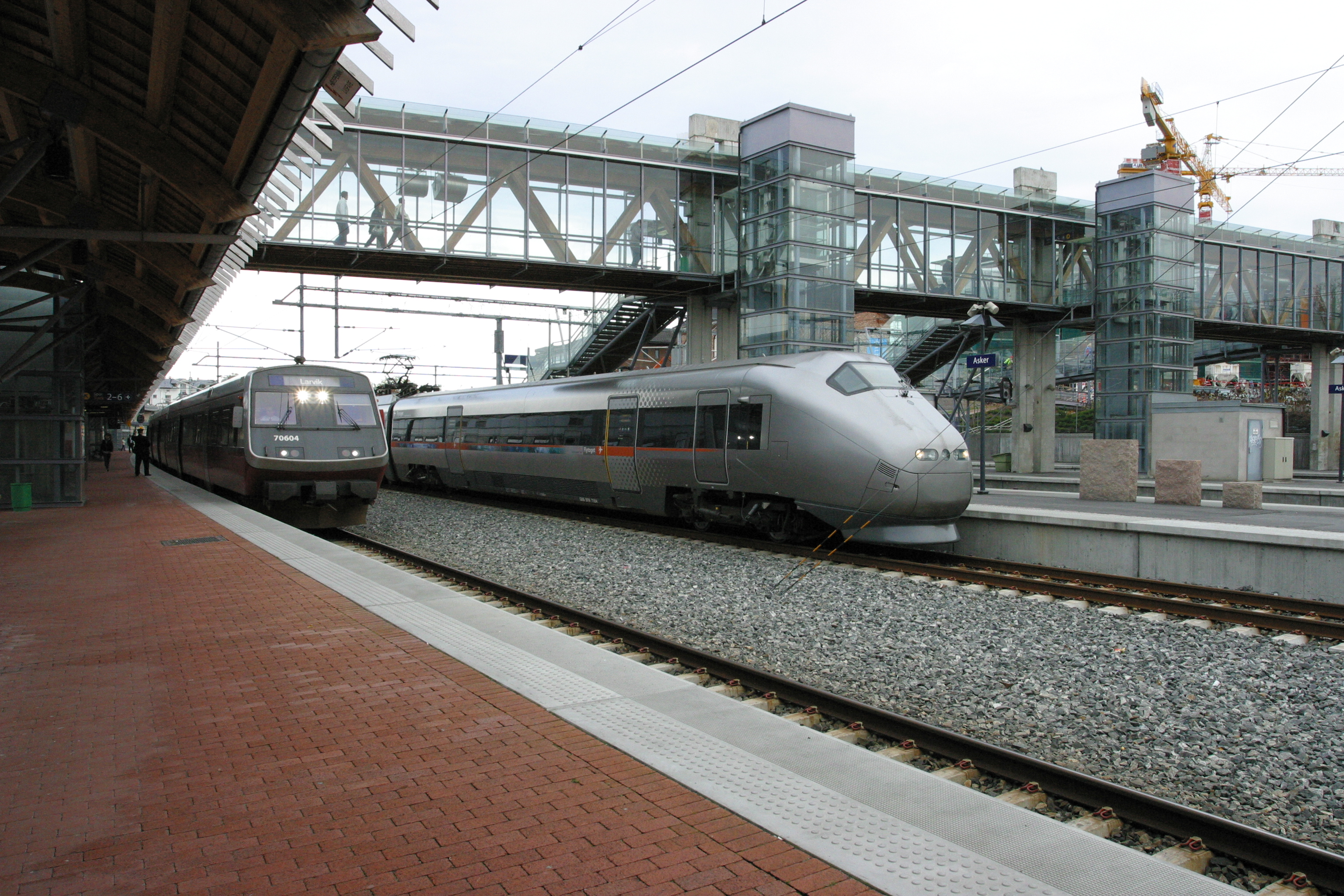
A regional Class 70 train (left) and an Airport Express Train

The station has six tracks, served by two island platforms and two side platforms. They are numbered 1 through 6, with track 1 closest to the town. It is located at a bus terminal, operated by Akershus Kollektivterminaler. The station is not staffed, but is equipped with ticket vending machines and features and indoor waiting room and kiosk. All platforms are covered. The station features locked bicycle parking, a taxi stand, and 544 parking spaces.

The station is located next to the town square in Asker. The station has been built to give a monumental impression, with the platforms, bus terminal and walkways built with a common style, using untreated concrete, untreated wood, glass, steel and zinc roofs. The walkways have been built with massive, visible wooden girders. The underpass has been decorated by artists Sven Påhlsson and Erik Wøllo. It includes LED-lights aimed along the concrete walls which vary their colors and a sound track playing electronic music.

An estimated 4,500 people live within one kilometer (0.6 mi) from the station, and 8,900 people within two kilometers (1.2 mi). There are about 4,500 jobs within one kilometer (0.6 mi) of the station. Asker is one of four transit hubs located outside Oslo on the Drammen Line, along with Drammen Station, Sandvika Station and Lysaker Station. It is, just marginally, the busiest of these, with about 8,400 passengers per day in 2008.

== Services ==
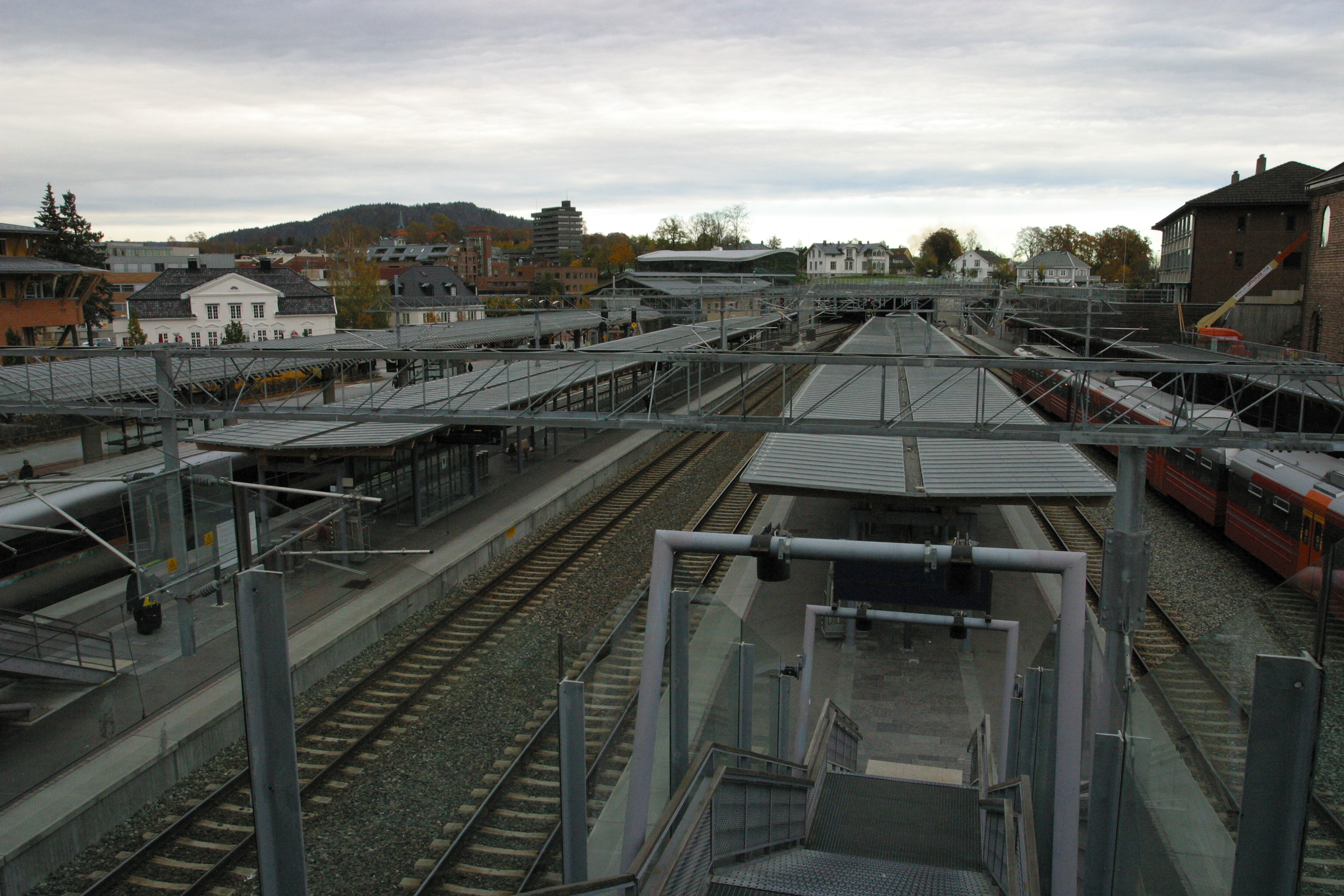
The station's six tracks seen from the walkway

Vy serves Asker Station both with Oslo Commuter Rail trains as well as regional trains. Regarding the former, L1 trains, which run northwards along the Drammen Line and southwards along the Spikkestad Line, run every half-hour. L12 to Kongsberg and Eidsvoll runs every hour, while L14, which runs along the Kongsvinger Line, runs hourly and terminates at Asker. These and regional trains run along the Asker Line. There is an hour regional train service from the Vestfold Line, R10. Each of these trains may have additional rush-hour services. and up to five daily express trains along the Sørlandet Line and the Bergen Line. Travel time for a local or regional train running to Oslo Central Station via the Asker Line is about X minutes.

The Airport Express Train runs every 20 minutes to Oslo Airport, Gardermoen. Ruter uses Asker Station as the main bus terminal for Asker. Asker Station is in fare zone 2V and is served by bus routes 71, 75, 280, 270, 281,275, 260, 285, 291, 293, 294, 296, 297. All routes except for route 75 is operated by Ruter. Route 75 is operated by Brakar but Ruter tickets for zone 2V are still valid

== Bibliography ==
- Bjerke, Thor; Holom, Finn (2004). Banedata 2004 (in Norwegian). Hamar / Oslo: Norsk Jernbanemuseum / Norsk Jernbaneklubb. ISBN 82-90286-28-7.
- Hartmann, Eivind; Mangset, Øistein; Reisegg, Øyvind (1997). Neste stasjon (in Norwegian). Gyldendal. ISBN 82-05-25294-7.
- Mamen, Hans Chr. (1963). Askers historie (in Norwegian). Asker: Asker skolestyre.
- Thue, Lars (1984). Askers historie 1840–1980 (in Norwegian). Oslo: Universitetsforlaget. ISBN 82-00-06345-3.
- Torp, Niels (1997). Niels Torp arkitekter MNAL. Oslo: Andresen & Butenschøn.

Preceding station	Express trains		Following station
Drammen	F4	Bergen–Oslo S	Sandvika
Drammen	F5	Stavanger-Kristiansand–Oslo S	Sandvika
Preceding station	Regional trains		Following station
Drammen	RE10	Drammen–Oslo S–Lillehammer	Sandvika
Drammen	RE11	Skien–Oslo S–Eidsvoll	Sandvika
Preceding station	Flytoget		Following station
Drammen Terminus		FLY1	Sandvika towards Oslo Airport, Gardemoen
Preceding station	Local trains		Following station
Bondivann	L1	Spikkestad–Oslo S–Lillestrøm	Høn
Drammen	R12	Kongsberg–Oslo S–Eidsvoll	Sandvika
Lier	R13	Drammen–Oslo S–Dal	Sandvika
—	R14	Asker–Oslo S–Kongsvinger	Sandvika
