= Jong, Norway =

- Village
- Location in Akershus
- Coordinates: 59°53′25″N 10°30′08″E
- Country: Norway
- Region: Østlandet
- County: Akershus
- Municipality: Bærum
- Time zone: UTC+01:00 (CET)
  - Summer (DST): UTC+02:00 (CEST)

Jong is a district in the municipality of Bærum, Norway. Mainly a residential area, the population in 2007 was 4,778.

This residential area is located west of the city Sandvika, on top of the hill Jongsåsen.

The district has a primary school, Jong skole. The traffic is low compared to other local residential areas.
