= Drammen Line =

Norwegian railway line between Oslo and Drammen

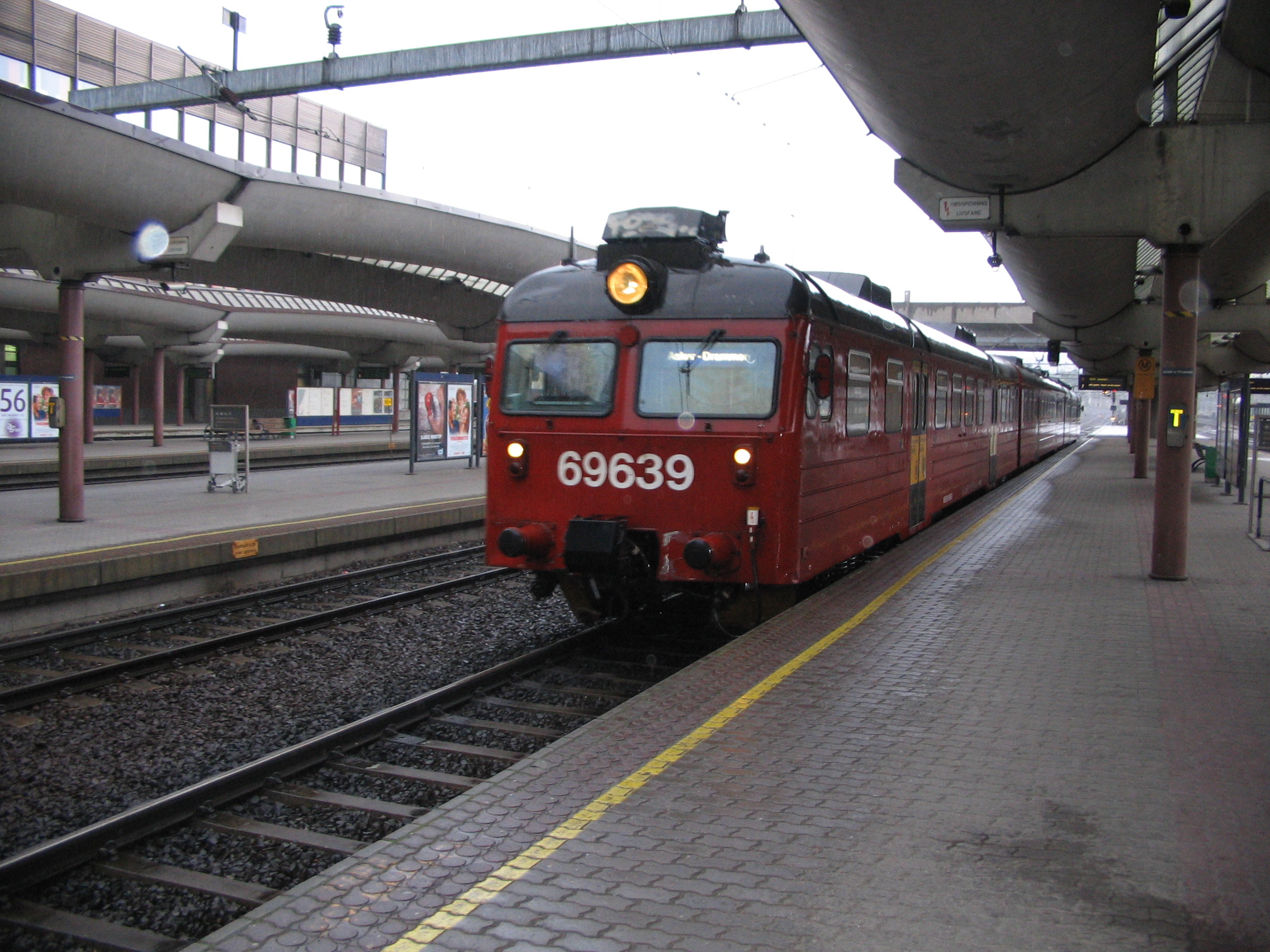
- NSB Class 69 local train units are used on the Drammen Line, here shown at Oslo S, the terminus of the line.

Overview
- Native name: Drammenbanen
- Owner: Bane NOR
- Termini: Oslo S; Drammen
- Stations: 17

Service
- Type: Railway
- Operator(s): Vy; Flytoget; CargoNet
- Rolling stock: Class 69, Class 70, Class 71, Class 72, Class 73

History
- Opened: 7 October 1872

Technical
- Line length: 52.86 km (32.85 mi)
- Number of tracks: Double
- Track gauge: 1,435 mm (4 ft 8 1/2 in)
- Old gauge: 1,067 mm (3 ft 6 in)
- Electrification: 15 kV 16.7 Hz AC
- Operating speed: Max. 160 kilometres per hour (99 mph)

The Drammen Line (Norwegian: Drammenbanen) is a 52.86-kilometre (32.85 mi) railway line between Oslo and Drammen, Norway, which was opened on 7 October 1872. It serves all trains west of Oslo Central Station and is owned by Bane NOR.

The line opened as a 1,067 mm (3 ft 6 in) narrow gauge railway, and was rebuilt to standard gauge between 1913 and 1922. In 1922, it became the first line on the national network to be electrified. The Lieråsen Tunnel shortened the line in 1973, and in 1980 the Oslo Tunnel was built, allowing the line to connect to the new Oslo Central Station. The Asker Line runs parallel to the Drammen Line, mostly in tunnels.

At Drammen, the Vestfold Line branches off to the south while the Bergen Line and the Sørlandet Line continue together to Hokksund along the Randsfjorden Line. The entire line has double track due to the heavy traffic on the line. The longest Norwegian railway bridge is just before Drammen where the line crosses the Drammen river. That bridge is 454 metres long.

== History ==
Both Drammen and Oslo were important ports serving Eastern Norway, and both had by the 1870s their own railway lines. Oslo was connected to Romerike by the Hoved Line and to Sweden by the Kongsvinger Line, while Drammen was connected to Ringerike by the Randsfjorden Line. The most important use of the lines were shipment of lumber to the respective ports for export, but the lines also saw an increasing passenger traffic. Due to the cheap and quick construction method propagated by NSB at the time, the Randsfjord Line was built in narrow gauge; the lines connecting to Oslo were on the other hand built in standard gauge, to ensure compatibility with the Swedish railway network. There was a considerable feeling of rivalry between the two cities at the time, and particularly in Drammen there was skepticism of building a line that could dilute the cities regional influence on behalf of the capital.

Radical forces eventually succeeded in changing the tide of opinion, and Drammen politicians allowed the construction of the line. The rail gauge issue still created a problem, as did the location of the railway station in Oslo; Oslo East Station was located at the then east end of the city, and a line from Drammen—located to the west of Oslo—would either have to take the long trip around the north of the city, or terminate at a separate station on the west end. The latter solution was chosen, and Oslo West Station was opened along with the new line.

=== Electrification and double track ===
Built as a narrow gauge railway, the Drammen Line was converted to a dual gauge railway between 1917 and 1920. On 13 November 1922 the dual gauge was removed. The line from Oslo V to Brakerøya was electrified on 26 November 1922 while the line from Brakerøya to Drammen was electrified on 6 May 1930. The Drammen Line was the second railway line in Norway to be rebuilt to double track. The line from Oslo V to Sandvika was opened with double track on 26 November 1922 while the line from Sandvika to Asker was extended in three steps: Billingstad–Hvalstad on 24 July 1953, Hvalstad–Asker on 29 November 1955 and Sandvika–Billingstad on 9 November 1958. Double track further to Brakerøya in Drammen opened with the Lieråsen Tunnel, while the last part over the bridge into Drammen Station was finished in 1996.

=== Lieråsen Tunnel ===
The most significant shortening of the line came with the opening of the 10.7-kilometre (10,700 m) long Lieråsen Tunnel on 3 June 1973, part of a new 15.2-kilometre (9.4 mi) line from Asker to Brakerøya. This concluded the double track to Brakerøya in Drammen, and shortened the railway by 12,438 metres (40,807 ft). Part of the old line, from Asker to Spikkestad, has been kept as the single-tracked Spikkestad Line, used by commuter trains.

=== Oslo Tunnel ===
After decades of planning, the 3,632-metre (11,916 ft) Oslo Tunnel opened in 1980, extending the Drammen Line from Skøyen to the new Oslo Central Station, that replaced Oslo East Station. The former terminus of Oslo West Station was closed, and has since been converted into the office of the Nobel Peace Prize. The railway from Skøyen to Oslo V has been reclassified to the Skøyen–Filipstad Line, and is used for freight trains serving the Oslo Port. The former Port Line that connected the east and west stations was removed.

=== Asker Line ===
The Asker Line is a partially completed line that supplements the Drammen Line between Oslo and Asker. Construction started in 2001, with the first section from Asker to Sandvika opening in 2005. The section from Sandvika to Lysaker opened in 2011. The construction of the last section in the original plans, from Lysaker to Skøyen, was first postponed until after 2020, but in 2020, new planning started for a longer project extending all the way to Oslo Central Station, bypassing Skøyen to the north on the preferred route. The line only serves Asker, Sandvika and Lysaker (the planned extension will add Nationaltheatret and Oslo Central), and allowed the capacity west of Lysaker to increase from 12 to 26 trains per hour. The Asker Line, allowing speeds at 160 kilometres per hour (99 mph), is used by express and regional trains, along with the Airport Express Train. It is also used by freight trains at night.

== See also ==
- Narrow gauge railways in Norway
