= Lillestrøm Station =

Railway station in Skedsmo, Norway

Lillestrøm
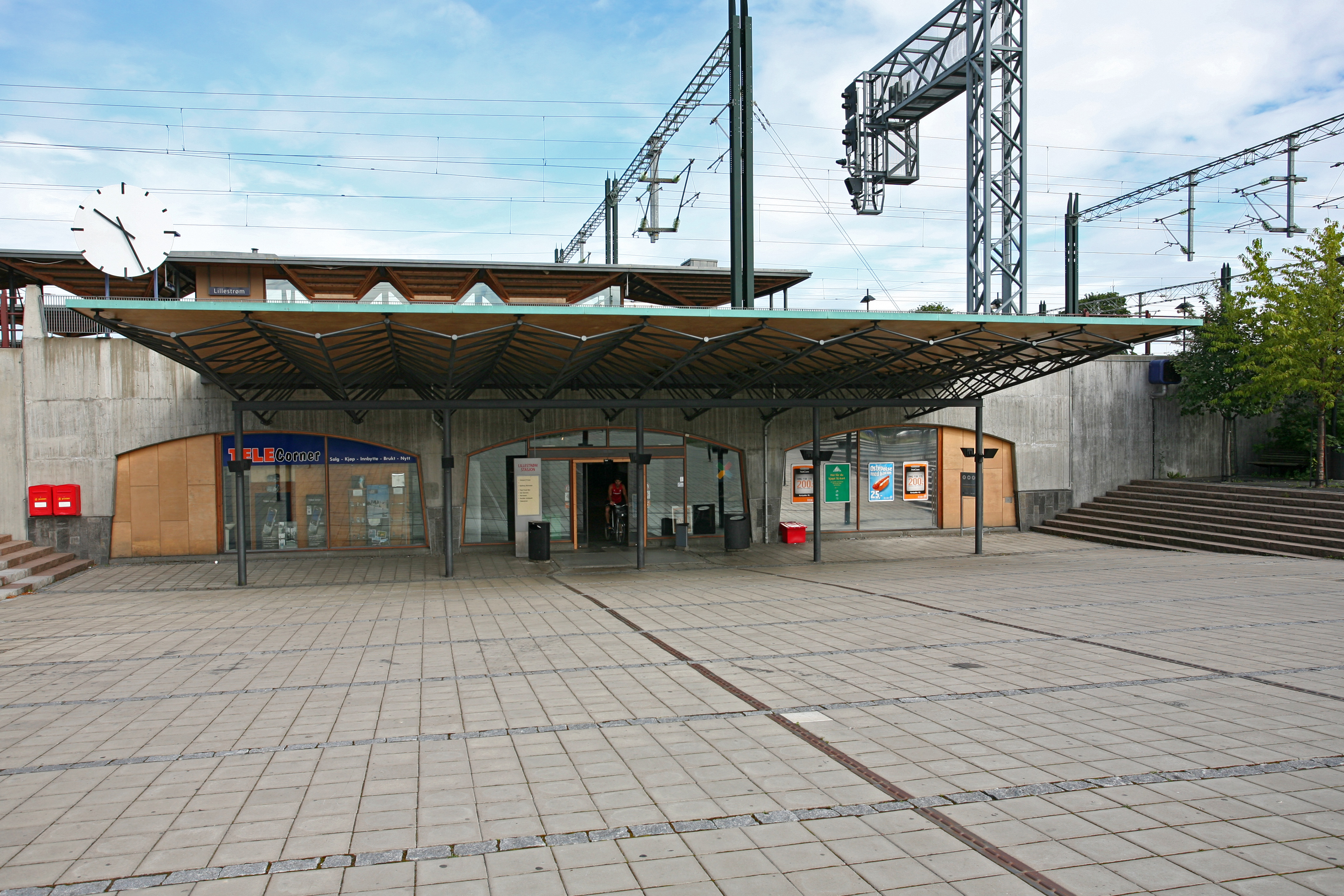

General information
- Location: Lillestrøm, Skedsmo; Norway
- Coordinates: 59°57′11″N 11°2′40″E
- Elevation: 109.0 m (357.6 ft) AMSL
- Owner: Bane NOR
- Operator: Airport Express Train; SJ; SJ Norge; Vy
- Lines: Gardermoen Line; Trunk Line; Kongsvinger Line
- Distance: 20.95 km (13.02 mi)
- Platforms: 8
- Connections: Bus: Ruter

Other information
- Station code: LLS
- Fare zone: 2Ø

History
- Opened: 1854; 172 years ago
Location
- Location within Norway

Lillestrøm Station (Norwegian: Lillestrøm stasjon) is a railway station serving the town of Lillestrøm in Skedsmo, Norway. Located on the Gardermoen Line and the Trunk Line as well as being the western terminus of the Kongsvinger Line, it is the main transport hub of the eastern parts of the Greater Oslo area, and all trains east of Oslo – local, regional, airport express, and long-distance express – call at Lillestrøm.

== History ==
The station was built as part of the Trunk Line, Norway's first railway, and opened in 1854. When the new Gardermoen Line from Oslo via Oslo Airport, Gardermoen to Eidsvoll opened in 1998 the station was completely renovated and became the only stop for the Airport Express Train east of Oslo.

== Lines and services ==
Preceding station	Express trains		Following station
Oslo S	F1	Oslo S–Stockholm C	Kongsvinger
Oslo S Terminus		F6	Oslo Airport towards Trondheim S
Preceding station	Regional trains		Following station
Oslo S	RE10	Drammen–Oslo S–Lillehammer	Oslo Airport
Oslo S	RE11	Skien–Oslo S–Eidsvoll	Oslo Airport
Preceding station	Flytoget		Following station
Oslo S towards Drammen		FLY1	Oslo Airport, Gardemoen Terminus
Preceding station	Local trains		Following station
Sagdalen	L1	Spikkestad–Oslo S–Lillestrøm	—
Oslo S	R12	Kongsberg–Oslo S–Eidsvoll	Oslo Airport
Oslo S	R13	Drammen–Oslo S–Dal	Leirsund
Oslo S	R14	Asker–Oslo S–Kongsvinger	Tuen
