= Bane NOR =

Norwegian government agency

- Type: Government agency
- Industry: Railway infrastructure
- Predecessor: Jernbaneverket
- Founded: 5 February 2016; 10 years ago
- Headquarters: Oslo, Norway
- Area served: Norway
- Key people: Cato Hellesjø (Chair); Thor Gjermund Eriksen (CEO)
- Number of employees: 3,468 (2019)
- Parent: Norwegian Ministry of Transport and Communications
- Subsidiaries: Spordrift; Bane NOR Eiendom
- Website: www.banenor.no

Bane NOR SF is the Norwegian government agency responsible for owning, maintaining, operating and developing the Norwegian railway network, including the track, stations, and the majority of other infrastructure assets. It took over the operations of Jernbaneverket (railway administration) on 31 December 2016.

Since its official launch on 2 January 2017, Bane NOR has pursued the modernisation and expansion of the rail network; various contracts and partnerships were issued between 2017 and 2020 covering technical cooperation, component supply, design services, civil engineering works, and replacement of obsolete infrastructure. Capacity expansion efforts include the doubling of sections of the Bergen-Fløen and Vestfoldbanen lines, while the comprehensive replacement of over a dozen different signalling systems with the European Rail Traffic Management System (ERTMS) has also commenced. During the early 2020s, Bane NOR has encountered considerable difficulty in the delivery of the new Follo Line, which has suffered both delays and technical mishaps.

== History ==
The agency was created during the 2010s as a consequence of reforms of the railway sector enacted by the Conservative-led coalition government. Specifically, Bane NOR and the Norwegian Railway Directorate (Jernbanedirektoratet), were both created to replace the former agency, Jernbaneverket. The organisation also took over the management and development of railway properties following the acquisition and incorporation of ROM Eiendom from the Norwegian State Railways. On 2 January 2017, the agency, which is organised as a state enterprise, officially launched during a ceremony held at Oslo Central Station.

Bane NOR has sought to incorporate technologies and lessons from various other organisations and authorities; in early 2017, the agency renewed its cooperation agreement with the neighbouring infrastructure agency Swedish Transport Administration. In October 2019, Bane NOR and the Spanish railway infrastructure manager Administrador de Infraestructuras Ferroviarias signed a Memorandum of Understanding to cooperate on training, information exchange technical assistance; the agency highlighted the latter's expertise in European Rail Traffic Management System (ERTMS) operations in particular. The 15 different signaling systems in use across Norway are to be progressively replaced by ERTMS; Bane NOR is to be responsible for this. For this purpose, it has operated an ERTMS Pilot Line between Ski and Sarpsborg in eastern Norway, which achieved a relatively high punctuality rate of 94 per cent in 2019. Bane NOR hopes intelligent digital railway infrastructure will help cut construction costs via better modeling, improve safety margins and minimise service disruptions via real-time monitoring, and increase capacity via automatic train operation.

Various expansion and improvement efforts were able to be launched using funds provided by the Norwegian government. In October 2019, a contract between Bane NOR and the engineering consultancy firm COWI was signed for the development of a new double-track section of Bergen-Fløen line, which was the busiest single-track route in Northern Europe, to better serve the freight terminal at Nydårdstangen. That same month, two contracts were awarded for the civil engineering works to provide continuous double tracks along the Vestfoldbanen between Drammen and Tønsberg, enabling capacity to be more than doubled and for increased service efficiency. During August 2021, the German railway supplier Vossloh, was awarded a major comprehensive framework contract to provide switches and crossings for both conventional and heavy-haulage lines across the Norwegian railway network.

The delivery of the new Follo Line has been a particular source of difficulties for the agency; originally planned to be opened in December 2021, the bankruptcy of contractors, Condotte, not only delayed the opening date by one year but also reportedly cost Bane NOR 1.6 billion Norwegian kroner. Despite accepting the transference of much of the Blix Tunnel from contractor Acciona Ghella in October 2022, the tunnel was quickly found to require remedial work to repair damaged power cabling and seal multiple leaks, leading to an independent investigation into the tunnel's problems and may also be connected to the sudden resignations of Bane NOR's former CEO Gorm Frimannslund and executive development director Stine Undru.

On December 25 2024, Norway experienced a complete suspension of train services on all lines following a communication system failure first reported at 8:00 resulting in all trains being cancelled and passengers being stranded. as a result, passengers were able to book flights without any additional charges and taxi fares were refunded if receipts were provided. train services would resume at 21:00
