= Gullhella Station =

Railway station in Asker, Norway

Gullhella
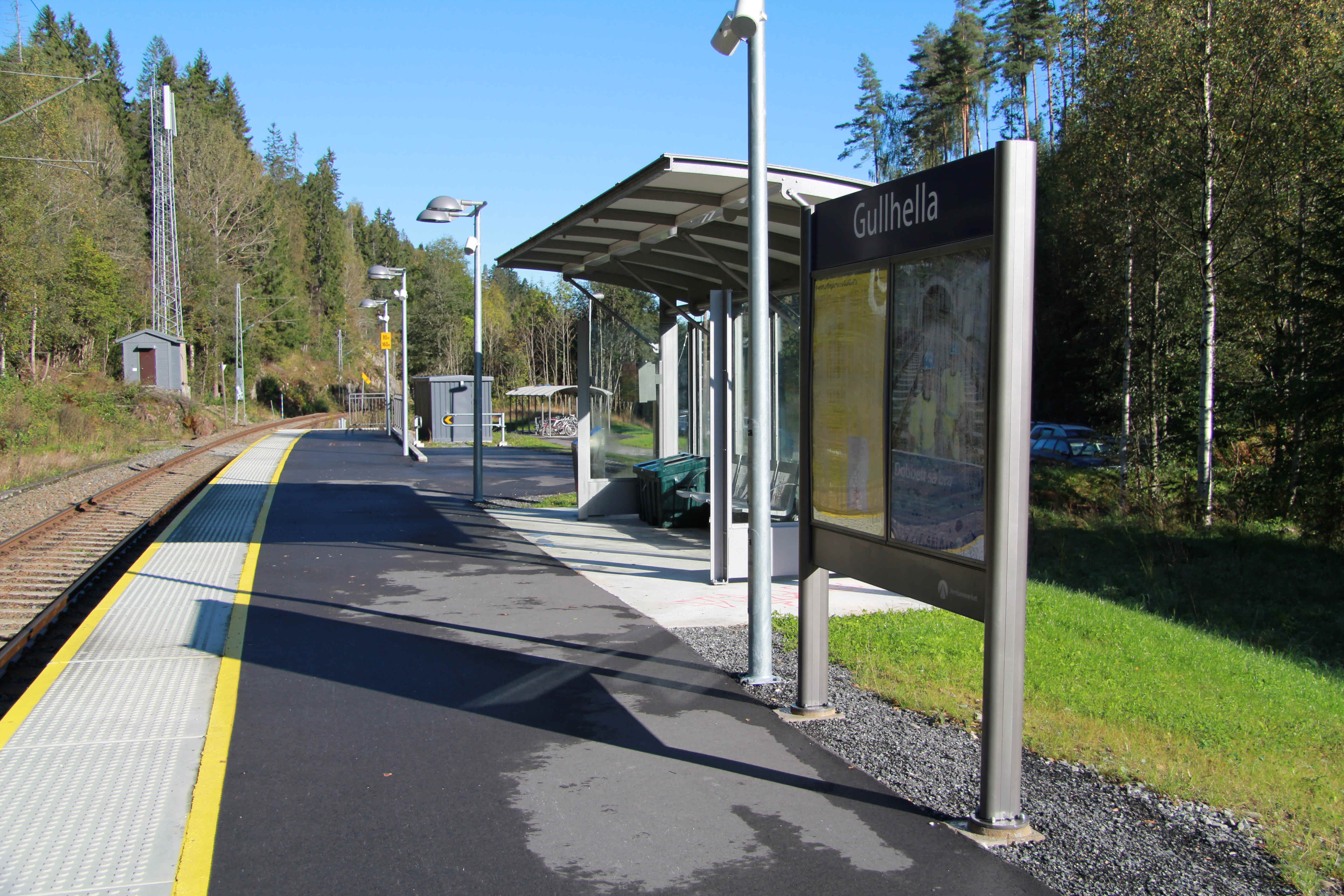

General information
- Location: Gullhella, Asker; Norway
- Coordinates: 59°48′24″N 10°26′11″E
- Owner: Bane NOR
- Operator: Vy
- Line: Spikkestad Line
- Distance: 26.96 km (16.75 mi)
- Platforms: 1

History
- Opened: 15 July 1937
Location

Gullhella Station (Norwegian: Gullhella holdeplass) is a railway station located at Gullhella in Asker, Norway on the Spikkestad Line. The station was opened as part of the Drammen Line on 15 July 1937, but in 1973 the new Lieråsen Tunnel opened through Lieråsen, and the old part of the Drammen Line was transformed to a commuter train line.

The station is served by Oslo Commuter Rail trains to Oslo Central Station and onward to Lillestrøm Station. Heggedal is primarily a residential area. The station was refurbished 2009–10.

Preceding station			Following station
Heggedal	Spikkestad Line		Bondivatn
Preceding station	Local trains		Following station
Heggedal	L1	Spikkestad–Oslo S–Lillestrøm	Bondivatn
