= Heggedal Station =

Railway station in Asker, Norway

Heggedal
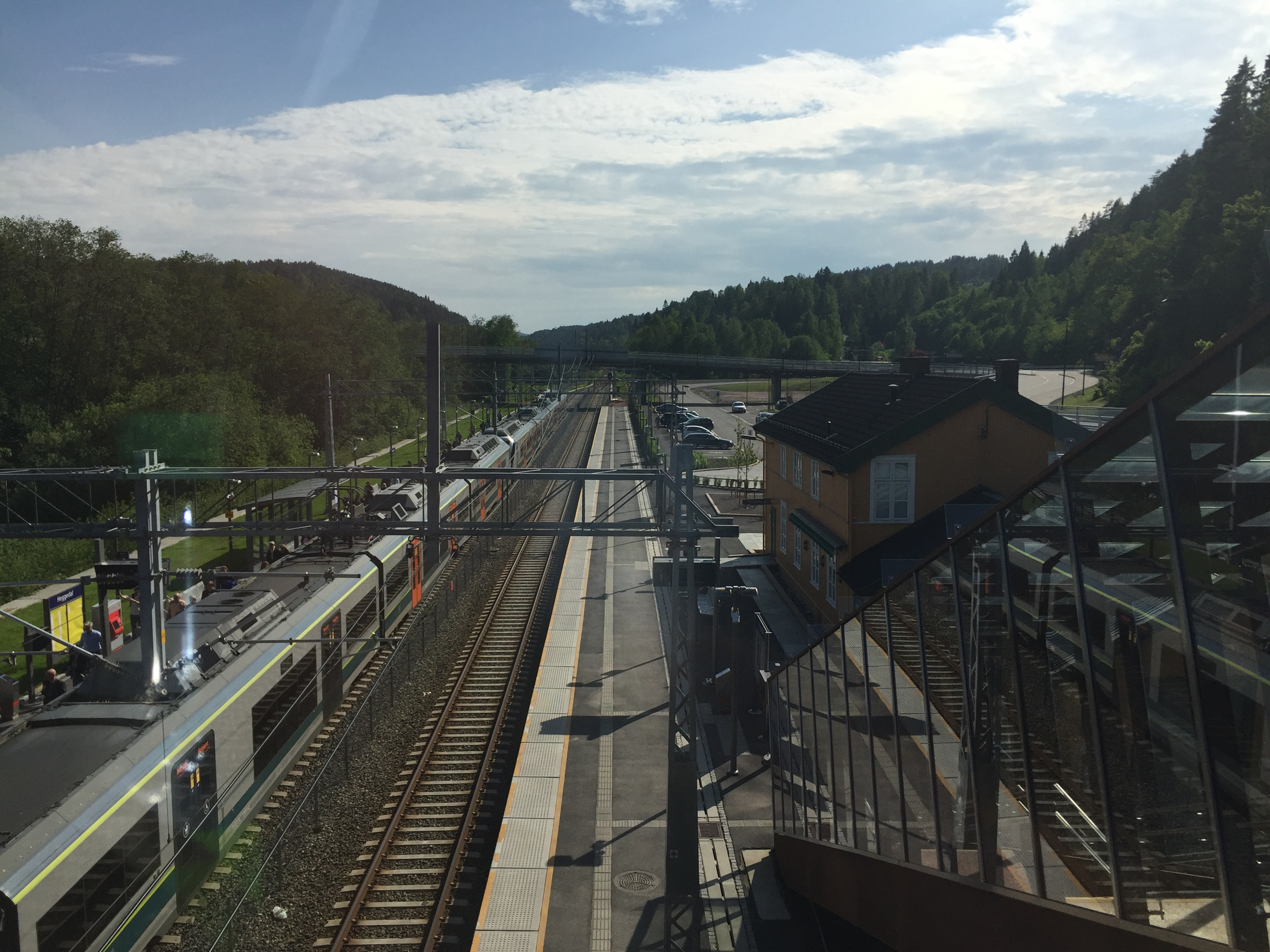

General information
- Location: Heggedal, Asker; Norway
- Coordinates: 59°47′13″N 10°25′52″E
- Elevation: 99.2 m (325 ft)
- Owner: Bane NOR
- Operator: Vy
- Line: Spikkestad Line
- Distance: 29.34 km (18.23 mi)
- Platforms: 2
- Tracks: 2

History
- Opened: 1 May 1874
Location

Heggedal Station (Norwegian: Heggedal stasjon) is a railway station located at Heggedal in Asker, Norway on the Spikkestad Line. Heggedal station is located around 99.2 meters above sea level and 29.34 km from Oslo Central Station.

== History ==
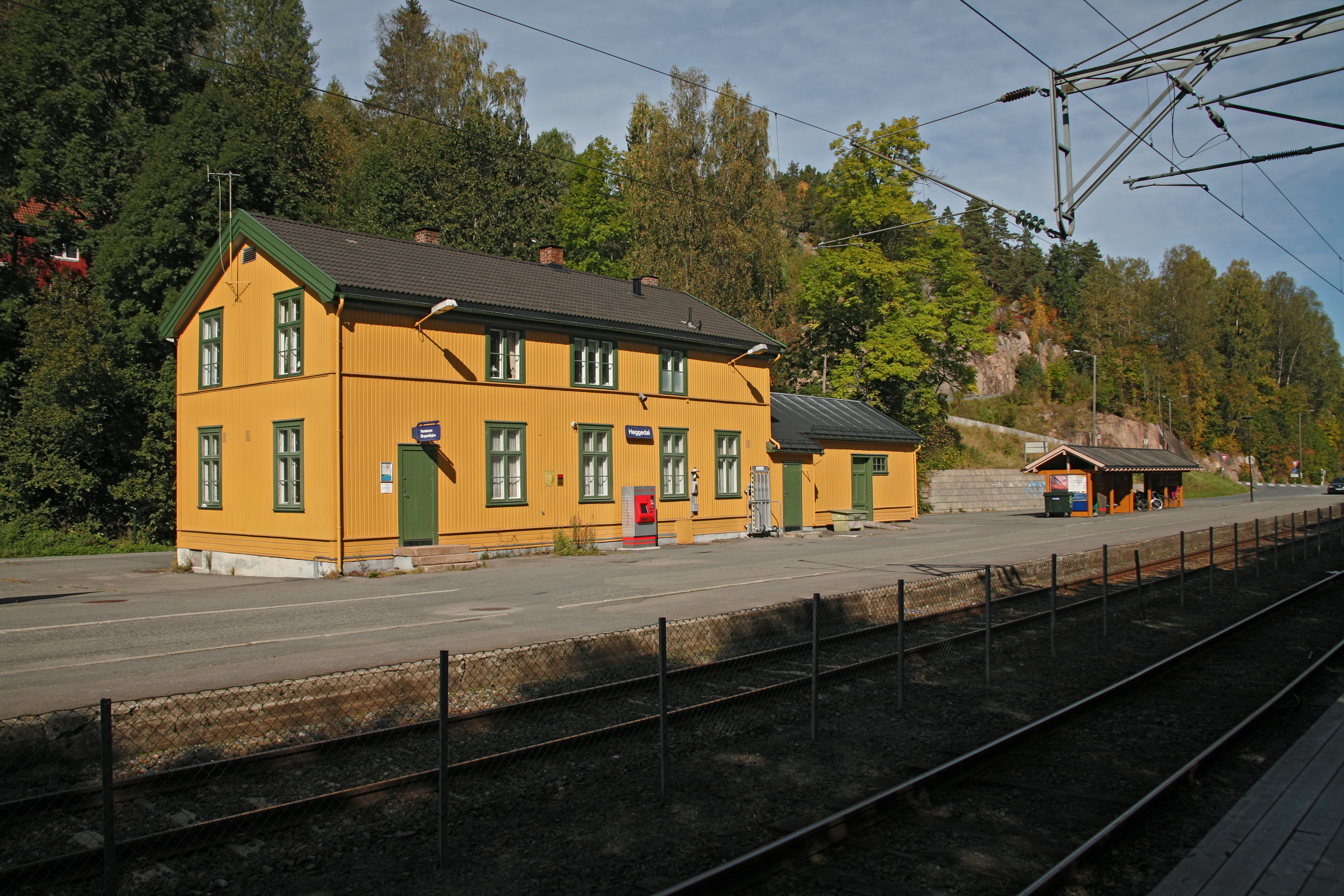
Heggedal Station

The station was opened as part of the Drammen Line in 1959, but in 1973 the new Lieråsen Tunnel opened through Lieråsen, and the old part of Drammen Line was transformed to a commuter train line. The station is served by Oslo Commuter Rail trains to Oslo S and onward to Lillestrøm. Heggedal is primarily a residential area.

In 2012 the station was redeveloped to fit the new Norwegian standard for stations. And a new platform was added to the existing structure.

In late 2015 the station was remodelled and structures added. A new automobile bridge and a new pedestrian bridge was added replacing the existing level crossing.

Preceding station			Following station
Røyken; Hallenskog	Spikkestad Line		Gullhella
Preceding station	Local trains		Following station
Røyken	L1	Spikkestad–Oslo S–Lillestrøm	Gullhella
