= Åsåker Station =

Railway station in Akershus county, Norway

Åsåker
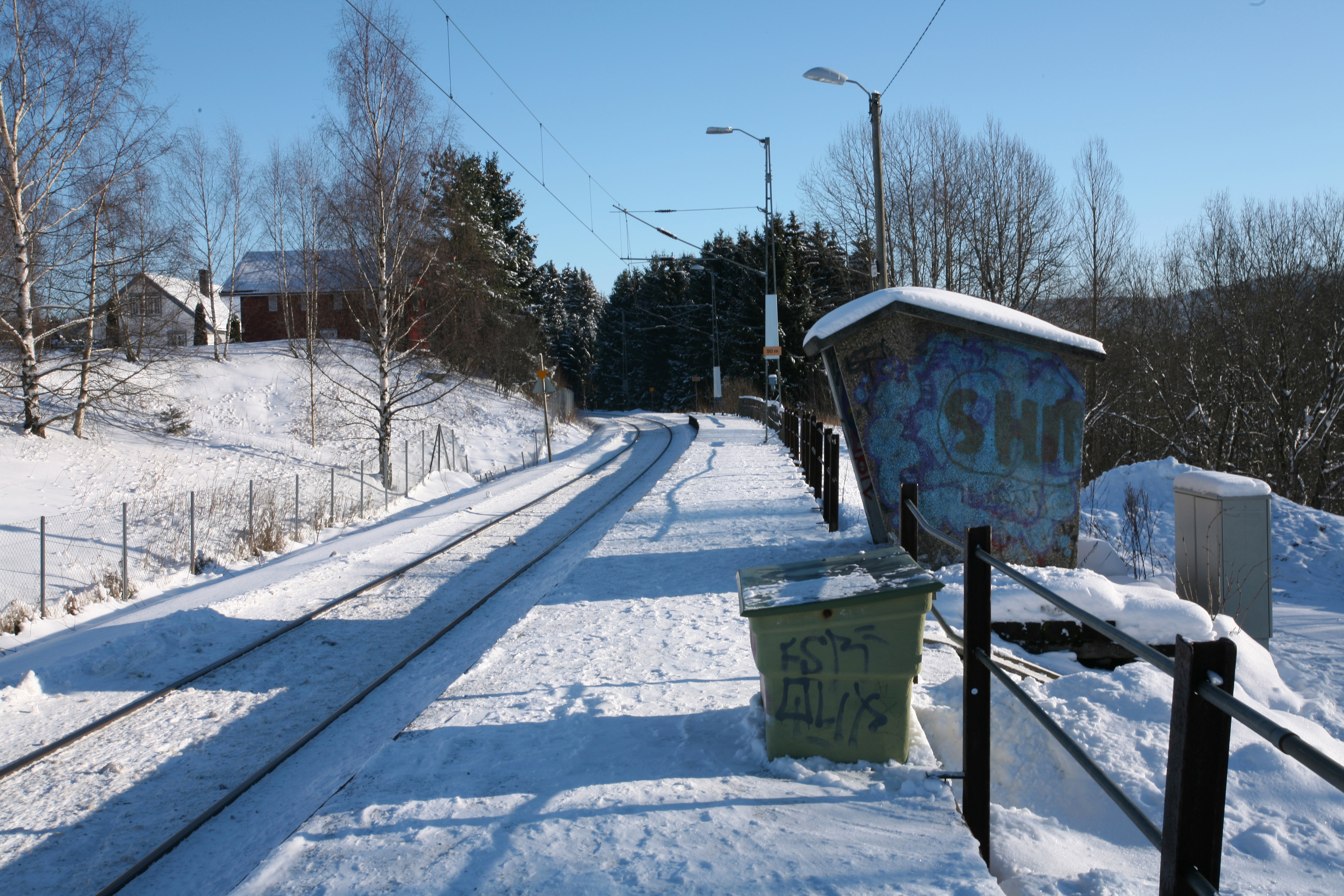

General information
- Location: Åsåker, Asker; Norway
- Coordinates: 59°44′29″N 10°21′54″E
- Line: Spikkestad Line
- Distance: 36.07 km (22.41 mi)
- Platforms: 1

Other information
- Fare zone: 3V/127

History
- Opened: 22 December 1959
- Closed: December 2012
Location

Åsåker Station (Norwegian: Åsåker holdeplass) was a railway station on the Spikkestad Linelocated at Åsåker in Asker, Norway. The station was opened as part of Drammenbanen on 22 December 1959, but in 1973 the new Lieråsen Tunnel opened through Lieråsen, and the old part of Drammen Line was transformed to a commuter train line.

The station was served by the Oslo Commuter Rail service to Oslo S and onward to Moss. Åsåker is primarily a residential area. The station was closed in 2012 due to low traffic.

Preceding station		Following station
Spikkestad	Spikkestad Line	Røyken
