= Bondivatn Station =

Railway station in Asker, Norway

Bondivatn
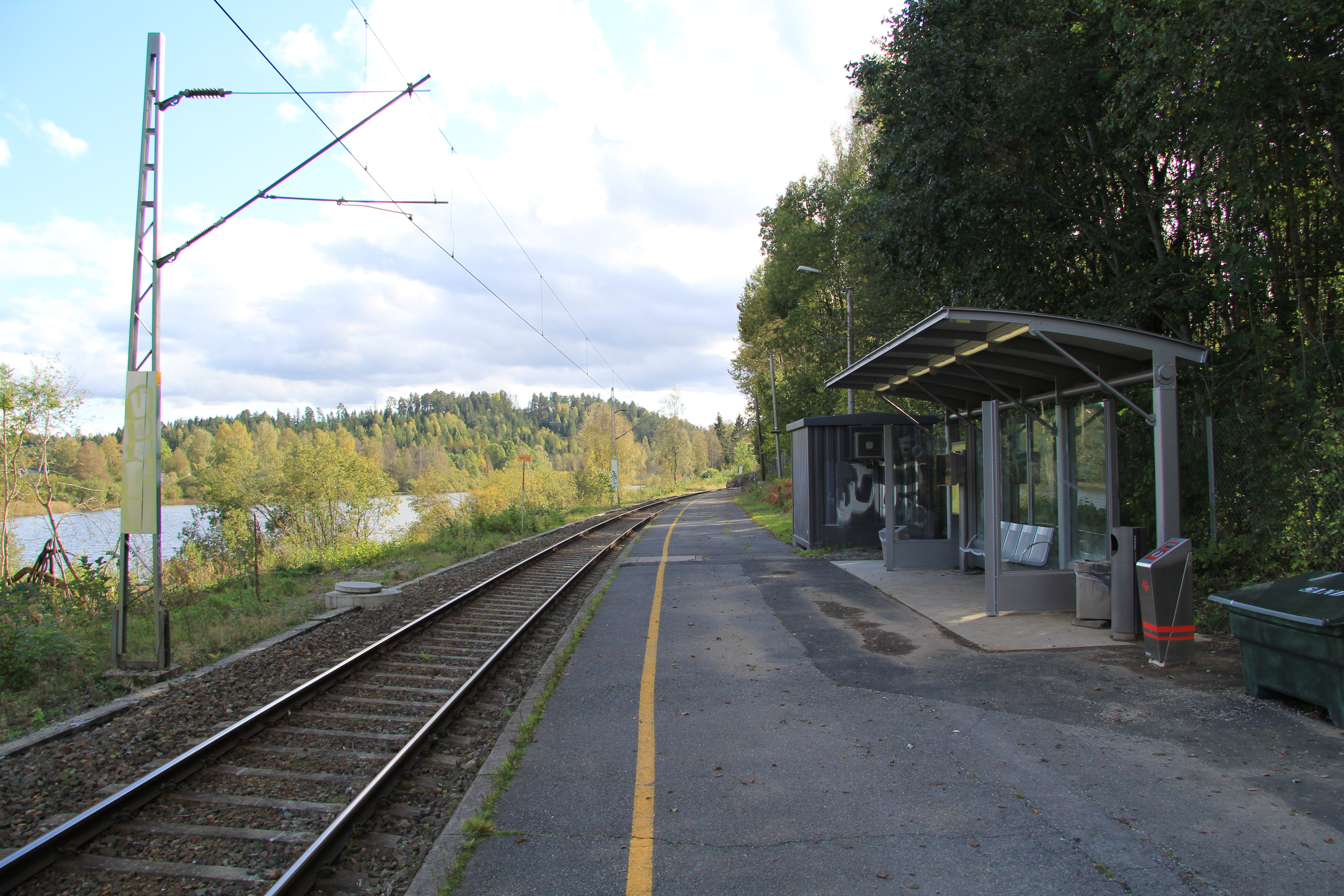

General information
- Location: Bondivatn, Asker; Norway
- Coordinates: 59°49′16″N 010°25′57″E
- Owner: Bane NOR
- Operator: Vy
- Line: Spikkestad Line
- Distance: 25.43 km (15.80 mi)
- Platforms: 2

History
- Opened: 7 July 1952
Location

Bondivatn Station (Norwegian: Bondivatn holdeplass) is a railway station in Asker, Norway on the Spikkestad Line. It was opened as part of the Drammen Line on 7 July 1952. In 1973, the Lieråsen Tunnel opened through Lieråsen, and the old part of the Drammen Line was transformed to a commuter train line.

The station is served by commuter trains to Oslo Central Station and onward to Lillestrøm Station. Bondivatn is primarily a residential area.

Preceding station			Following station
Gullhella	Spikkestad Line		Asker
Preceding station	Local trains		Following station
Gullhella	L1	Spikkestad–Oslo S–Lillestrøm	Asker
