= 1973 in rail transport =

This article lists events related to rail transport that occurred in 1973.

== Events ==
=== January events ===
- January 27 – MBTA purchases several rail lines in New England from Penn Central to form the basis of the new commuter system's network.

=== February events ===
- February 26 – Chessie System is incorporated to become the parent corporation of a combined B&O/C&O/WM railroad system.

=== March events ===
- March 13 – A riot breaks out at Ageo Station in Saitama, Japan as the National Railway Locomotive Engineers Union protests unsafe working conditions on the JNR.
- March 30 – Toronto's Yonge Subway is extended to York Mills station.

=== May events ===
- May 21 – Passenger traffic begins on the Bay Area Rapid Transit (BART) Concord line, through the 3.1 mi (5.0 km) Berkeley Hills Tunnel between Oakland and Orinda, California beneath the Berkeley Hills.

=== June events ===
- June 3 – The Norwegian State Railways open Lieråsen Tunnel on the Drammen Line between Asker and Lier (10.7 km (6.6 mi)).
- June 22 – The EMD SDP40F diesel locomotive enters revenue service with Amtrak.

=== August events ===
- August 17 – The last DB Class E 40 leaves the gates of the Krupp factory in Essen.

=== September events ===
- September 28 – Amtrak's Turboliners make their first run on the Chicago–St Louis corridor.

=== November events ===
- November 5 – Bay Area Rapid Transit Peninsula service starts between Downtown San Francisco and Daly City.
- November 27 – Toei Subway Line 6 (present-day Mita Line) is extended from Hibiya to Mita in Tokyo, Japan; its second extension since opening in 1968.

=== December events ===
- December 19 – The Ealing rail crash occurred when an express train from London Paddington to Oxford derails at speed between Ealing Broadway and West Ealing. Ten passengers are killed and 94 injured

=== Unknown date events ===
- The isolated coal hauler, the Black Mesa and Lake Powell Railroad, opens in Northern Arizona, the world's first line to use 50,000 V overhead line power.
- Transcameroon Railway extended to N'Gaoundéré.
- John W. Barriger III becomes president of the Boston and Maine Railroad.
