= Hurum Line =

Proposed railway line in Viken, Norway

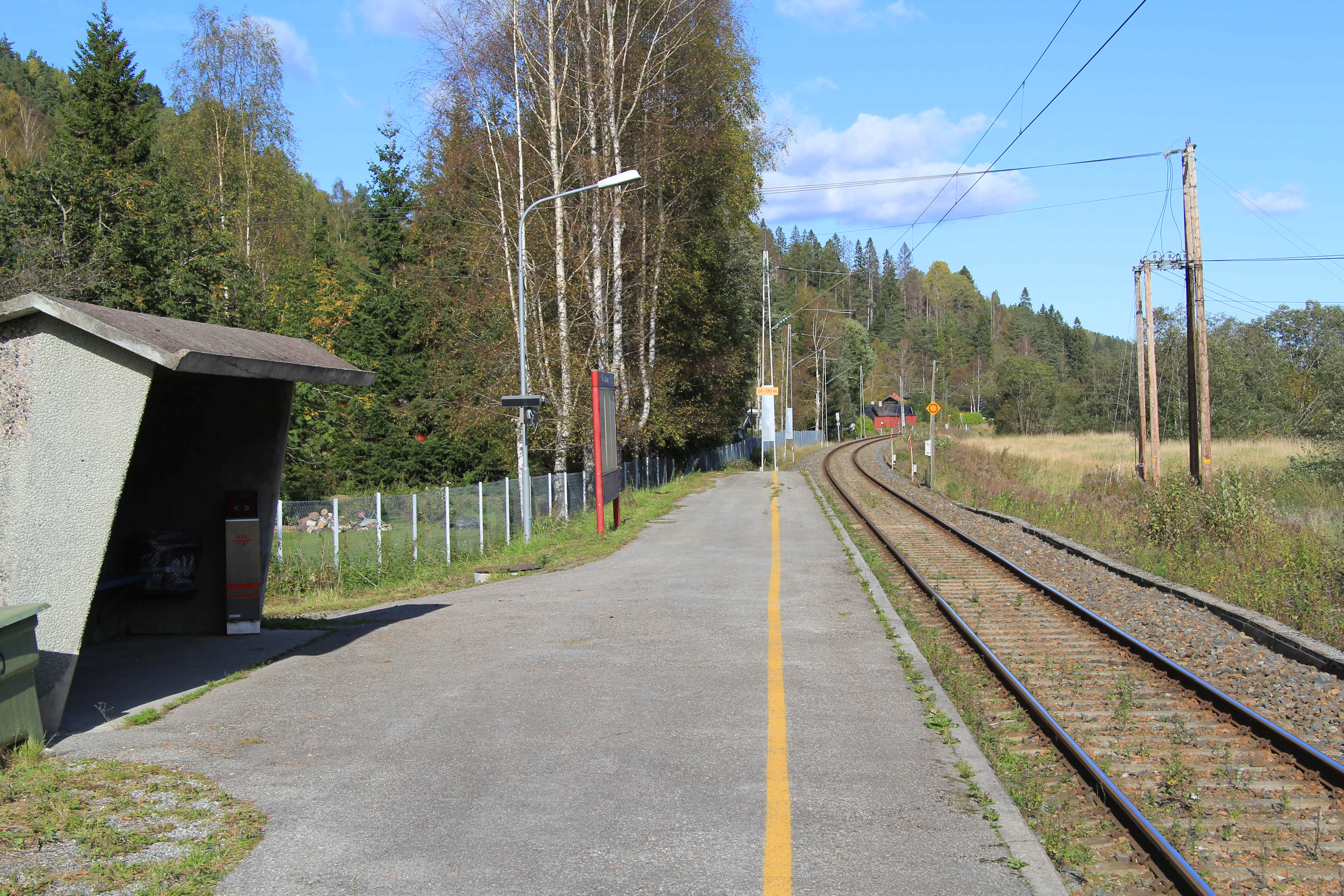
- Hallenskog Station, where the line would have diverted from the Spikkestad Line

Overview
- Native name: Hurumbanen
- Status: Discarded
- Termini: Hallenskog Station; Hurum Airport
- Stations: 1

Service
- Type: Railway
- System: Norwegian railways

Technical
- Line length: 14 km (9 mi)
- Number of tracks: Double
- Character: Passenger
- Track gauge: 1,435 mm (4 ft 8 1/2 in)
- Electrification: 15 kV 16.7 Hz AC
- Operating speed: 140 km/h (87 mph)
Route map
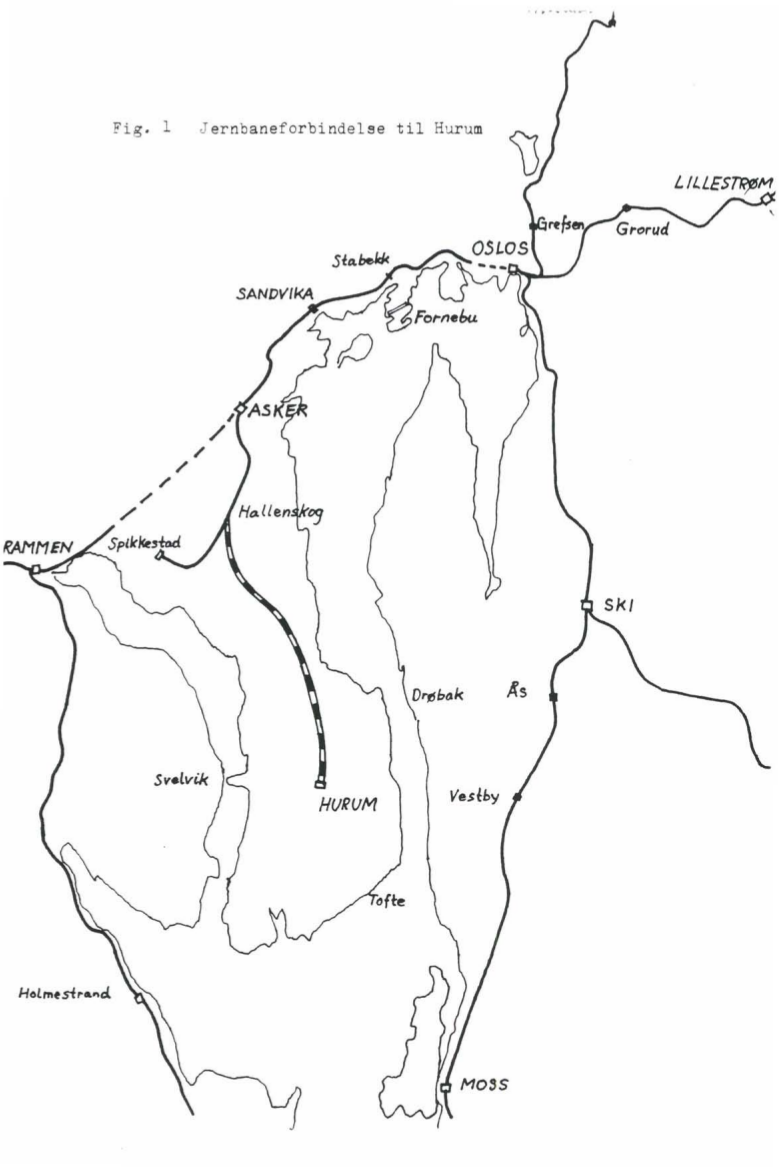

The Hurum Line (Norwegian: Hurumbanen) was a proposed railway line which would have connected Røyken and Hurum in Asker municipality, Norway. Launched during the Oslo Airport location controversy during the second half of the 1980s, its main purpose was to act as an airport rail link to serve the proposed national airport on Hurumlandet. The main proposal for the line called for a 14-kilometer (8.7 mi) section of double track which would branch from the Spikkestad Line at Hallenskog. Construction of the Hurum Line would have seen 7 kilometers (4.3 mi) of the Spikkestad Line upgraded to double track as well as upgrades to the Drammen Line. The distance from Hurum to Oslo is 45 kilometers (28 mi), with travel time estimated at 35 minutes.

Alternative proposals were also made, such as building a bridge over the Oslofjord and connecting it to the Østfold Line, or the use of coaches and hovercraft. There were also proposals for a monorail and a maglev service. The new airport was in 1992 instead chosen to be located at Gardermoen, resulting in the construction of the Gardermoen Line and the abandonment of any plans for building a railway to Hurum.

== History ==
Oslo Airport, Fornebu opened as Norway's main international gateway on 1 June 1939. Fornebu was located 7 kilometers (4.3 mi) from the city center of Oslo, on the peninsula of Fornebu. The cramped location made a suitable runway for intercontinental flights impossible to build and there was no place to build a second runway. A 1970 report proposed building a new airport to serve the capital and Eastern Norway, and mentioned Gardermoen, Hurum, Askim, Nesodden and Ås as suitable locations. Later Hobøl was also proposed. Various discussions were made for a new airport, and from 1972 all charter flights were moved to Gardermoen. The divided solution was accepted by Parliament, and approved a major expansion of Fornebu in 1983.

Political debate resurfaced the following year, after patronage continued to accelerate. The Civil Aviation Administration launched a proposal to build an airport at Hurum in 1986. The motion was supported by the center-right parties, commercial interests and the airlines, largely based on that Hurum was closer to more people. However, Minister of Transport and Communications Kjell Borgen of the Labor Party supported Gardermoen, large for reasons related to rural policies. Hence a series of government documents were created to investigate the various locations.

The Norwegian State Railways developed a series of plans for the various airport locations, including a Gardermoen Line and branches of the Østfold Line to Hobøl and Ås. The ground transport system was a major part of the considerations and proposals were made both for motorway and railway access to all the alternatives. Construction of the airport was to be carried out by a separate limited company owned by the Civil Aviation Administration. Hence the airport was financed using state grants which would be repaid. A similar model was used for roads and railways, in which a separate subsidiary of NSB would be set up to build new railway lines. Parliament voted on 8 June 1988 in favor of building a new airport at Hurum. A series of weather surveys were then published which showed unfavorable conditions and the matter was again brought up for political consideration. A final decision to build a new airport at Gardermoen was thus taken on 8 October 1992.

== Route ==
The route via Røyken was based on running trains from Oslo Central Station (Oslo S) via the Drammen Line to Asker Station and then continuing along the Spikkestad Line to Hallenskog Station. From there a new railway would be built to the airport. The total distance is 45 kilometers (28 mi), of which 24 kilometers (15 mi) would be along the Drammen Line, 7 kilometers (4.3 mi) along the Spikkestad Line and 14 kilometers (8.7 mi) would be a new railway. The Drammen Line between Oslo and Asker would need to be expanded with a third track and the Spikkestad Line between Asker and Hallenskog would have to be expanded to double track. The entire new section would also be built with double track. NSB estimated the construction costs in 1986 to 1.59 million.

The service would allow for four trains per hour between 07:00 and 23:00, giving sixty-four trains per direction per day. Travel time between Oslo S and the airport was estimated at 35 minutes, which would include stops at Asker Station and Sandvika Station. NSB estimated an annual ridership of 4.95 million, equal to 13,600 per day or 105 per train.

== Alternative proposals ==
A number of alternative modes were launched, including hovercraft, monorail and maglev, although evaluations were never carried out by the government. The latter would involve a shuttle bus from a quay at Hurum and could only serve a limited number of destinations. A more serious contender was basing all public transport on coaches. A 1986 report from the Institute of Transport Economics proposed coach services on both sides of the Oslofjord, and estimated that travel time by coach from downtown Oslo would take 69 minutes, compared to 68 minutes to Gardermoen. In average trains would transport people 30 minutes faster to Hurum than buses would.

An alternative route for the railway was proposed on the east side of the Oslofjord. It was proposed to follow the right-of-way launched in 1873 of branch of the Østfold Line running along the shore of the Bunnefjorden. Branching off between Ljan and Hauketo, it would have to traverse through four tunnels before reaching Kjærnes. It would then cross the fjord via two bridges, each connecting the island of Håøya to each side of the fjord. On Hurumlandet the railway would land close to Sætre and continue onwards to the airport. The route would have been 41 kilometers (25 mi) and was proposed designed for a speed of 140 kilometers per hour (87 mph), allowing for a travel time of 20 minutes. The route was variously proposed to be operated with conventional trains or as a light rail line. The bridges were part of a proposal to build an east–west connection between the main roads E6 and E18. It crossing was ultimately built as the Oslofjord Tunnel, which opened in 2000.

== Comparison ==
Hurum and Gardermoen were the two main proposals for a new airport. NSB also developed an alternative to serve Hobøl, which would be built as a branch of the Eastern Østfold Line at Kråkstad. For the proposal at Kroer, NSB devised rebuilding the Østfold Line between Ås and Vestby to serve the airport. Both of these required the construction of the Follo Line to increase capacity on the Østfold Line. If Fornebu was still to be used, NSB proposed building a branch from Lysaker Station on the Drammen Line to Fornebu, alternatively constructing a people mover from Stabekk Station.

NSB made four proposals for a new railway to Gardermoen. The simplest devised constructing a branch from the Trunk Line at a location north of Jessheim Station which would run to the airport. Alternatively, and ultimately selected, was construction of a tunnel eastwards from Oslo to Lillestrøm and an upgrade of the Trunk Line and a new route from a point at Asper to the airport. Two more direct routes were proposed; the one branching off from north of Grefsen Station on the Gjøvik Line, the other diverting from the Trunk Line close to Grorud Station. All four routes called for the railway to continue north from Gardermoen and meet up with the Trunk Line at Bøn Station.

Although Gardermoen is located further away than Hurum, the large degree of new, high-speed track allowed for a travel time of twenty minutes. The longer distance also gives longer driving time for cars, which resulted in estimated higher market share for the train. The Gardermoen alternative also allowed for the Intercity and long-haul trains on the Dovre Line to stop at the airport. While Hurum would give a larger portion of the population a shorter drive to the airport, the construction of the Gardermoen Line would conversely give a 15-minute-faster travel time than a train to Hurum from downtown Oslo.
