= Hallenskog Station =

Railway station in Røyken, Norway

Hallenskog
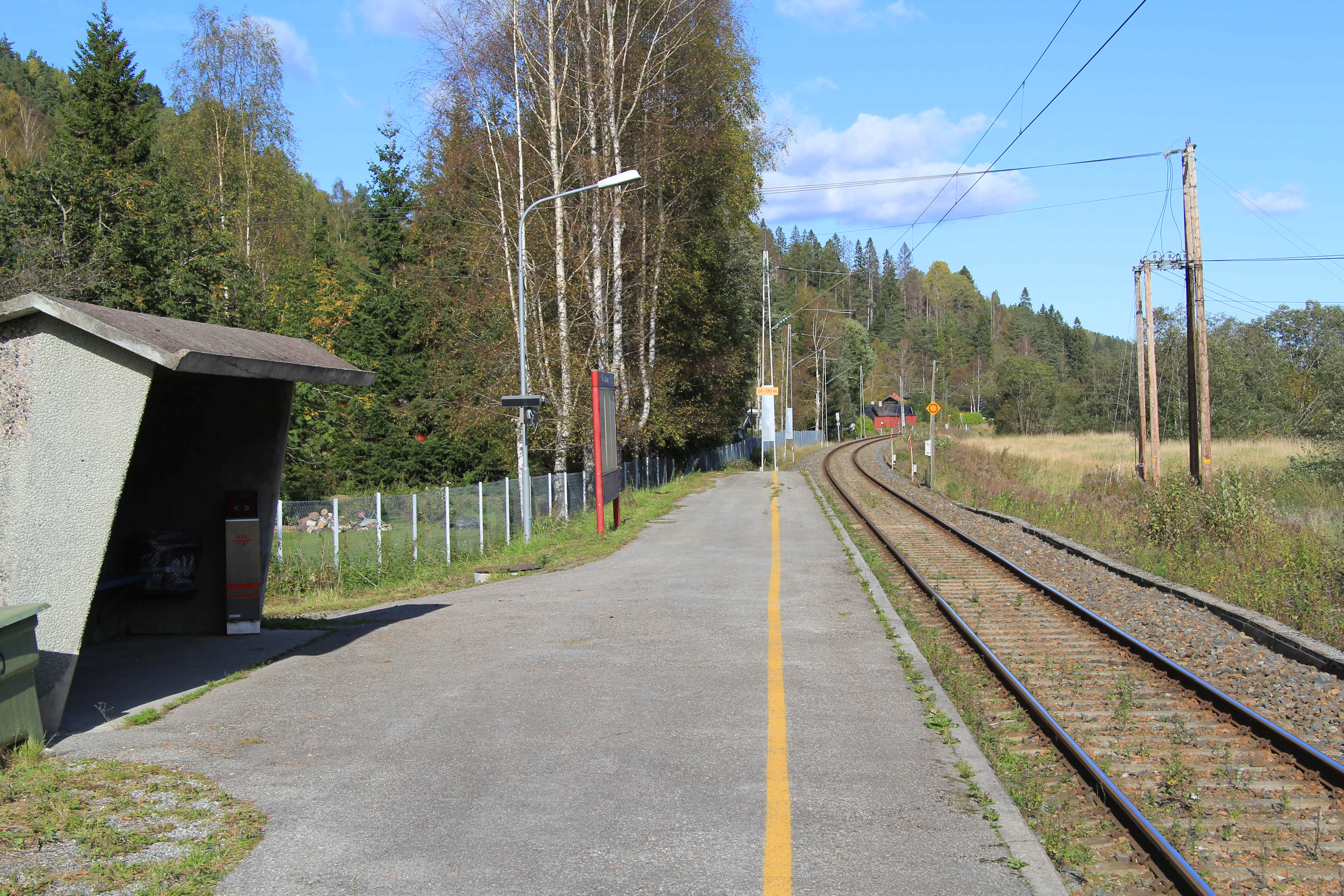

General information
- Location: Hallenskog, Asker; Norway
- Coordinates: 59°46′28″N 10°25′10″E
- Elevation: 100.9 m (331 ft)
- Line: Spikkestad Line
- Distance: 30.88 km (19.19 mi)
- Platforms: 1

History
- Opened: 19 February 1933
Location

Hallenskog Station (Norwegian: Hallenskog holdeplass) is a closed railway station located at Hallenskog in Asker, Norway on the Spikkestad Line. The station was opened as part of the Drammen Line in 1959, but in 1973 the new Lieråsen Tunnel opened through Lieråsen, and the old part of the Drammen Line was transformed to a commuter train line.

The station was served by the Oslo Commuter Rail to Oslo Central Station and onward to Lillestrøm. Hallenskog is primarily a residential area.

Preceding station		Following station
Røyken	Spikkestad Line	Heggedal
