= Heggedal =

- Village
- Location in Akershus Heggedal (Norway)
- Coordinates: 59°47′N 10°27′E
- Country: Norway
- Region: Østlandet
- County: Akershus
- Municipality: Asker
- Time zone: UTC+01:00 (CET)
  - Summer (DST): UTC+02:00 (CEST)

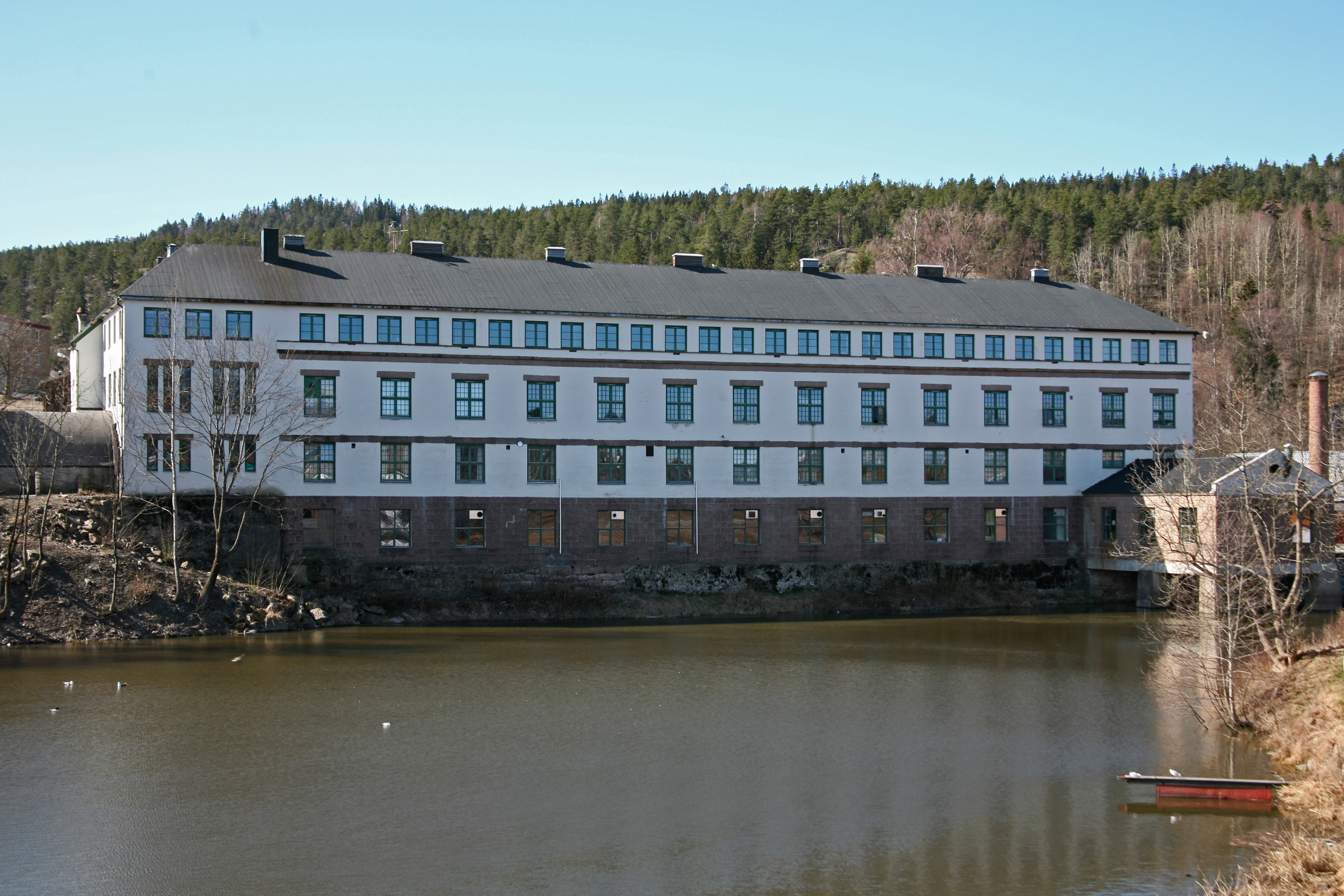
Heggedal factory

Heggedal is a part of the Asker municipality in Akershus county, Norway. For statistical purposes, it's usually treated as part of the Oslo urban area. In 2000, its population was 3,301 , and the election district named Heggedal had 2,329 registered voters in the 2005 election. It is mainly a residential area, though the area has a railway station, a church, a library, a middle school and a primary school.

== Geography ==
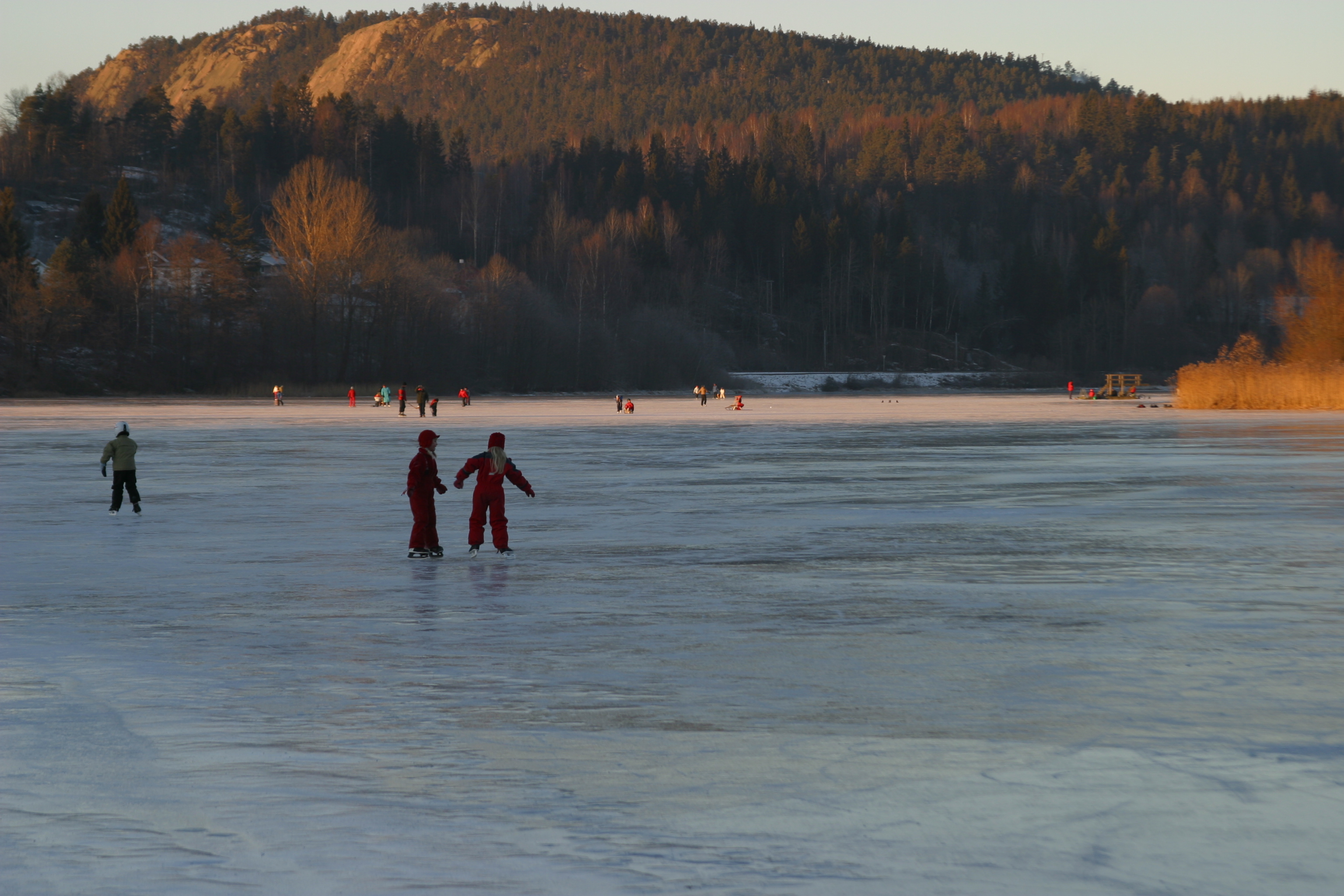
Children skaiting at Gjellumvannet.

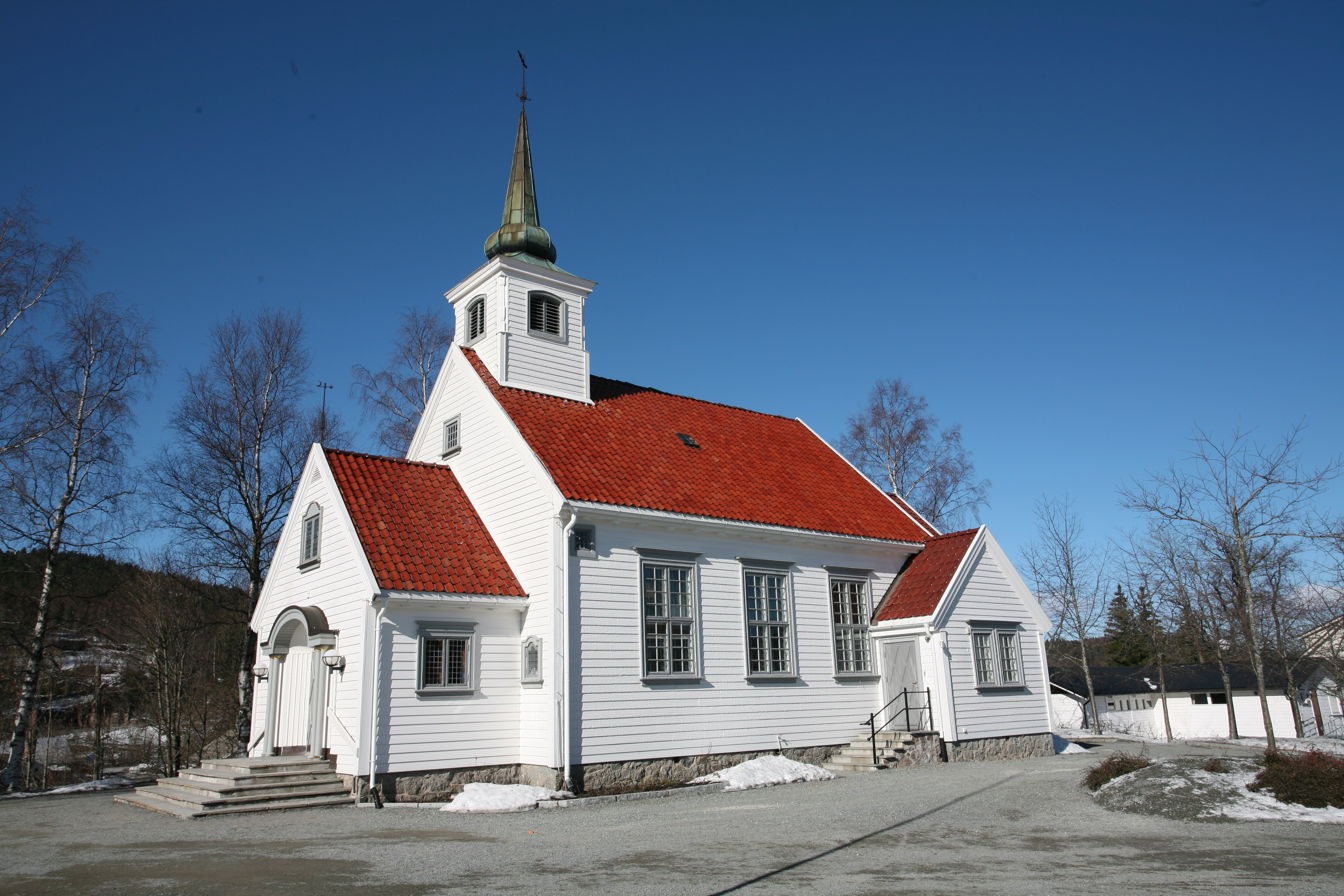
Heggedal church.

Heggedal is situated about 6 km south of the main settlement of Asker and the main highway between Oslo and Drammen, the E18. Heggedal lies about 1 km from the western coast of the Oslofjord, but still lies next to water, as there is a lake about 500 m by 150 m long called Gjellumvannet (lit. Gjellum water). The river Skithegga runs down from the nearby hill and into the water, and inland to the west lies Brennåsen, a hill 361 metres above sea level. Heggedal itself lies around 100 metres above sea level, with the railway station quoted at a height of 99.2 metres.

== Politics ==
Although the municipality of Asker is traditionally a conservative stronghold, with Conservatives having a strong position in the local government, Labour got the most votes in both the 2005 and the 2001 elections. The Progress Party was the second largest party in 2005, recording 22.6% of the votes, while the Conservatives got 19.2%. No other parties had anywhere above 8% in the recent election, though the Socialist Left Party was the fourth-largest party in 2001 with 14.1%. Their decline in 2005 reflected a nationwide trend. Both in 2001 and 2005, the result of the nation and the results in Heggedal were quite similar, although the Conservatives were stronger in Heggedal and the Christian People's Party and the Centre Party were weaker.

== Infrastructure ==
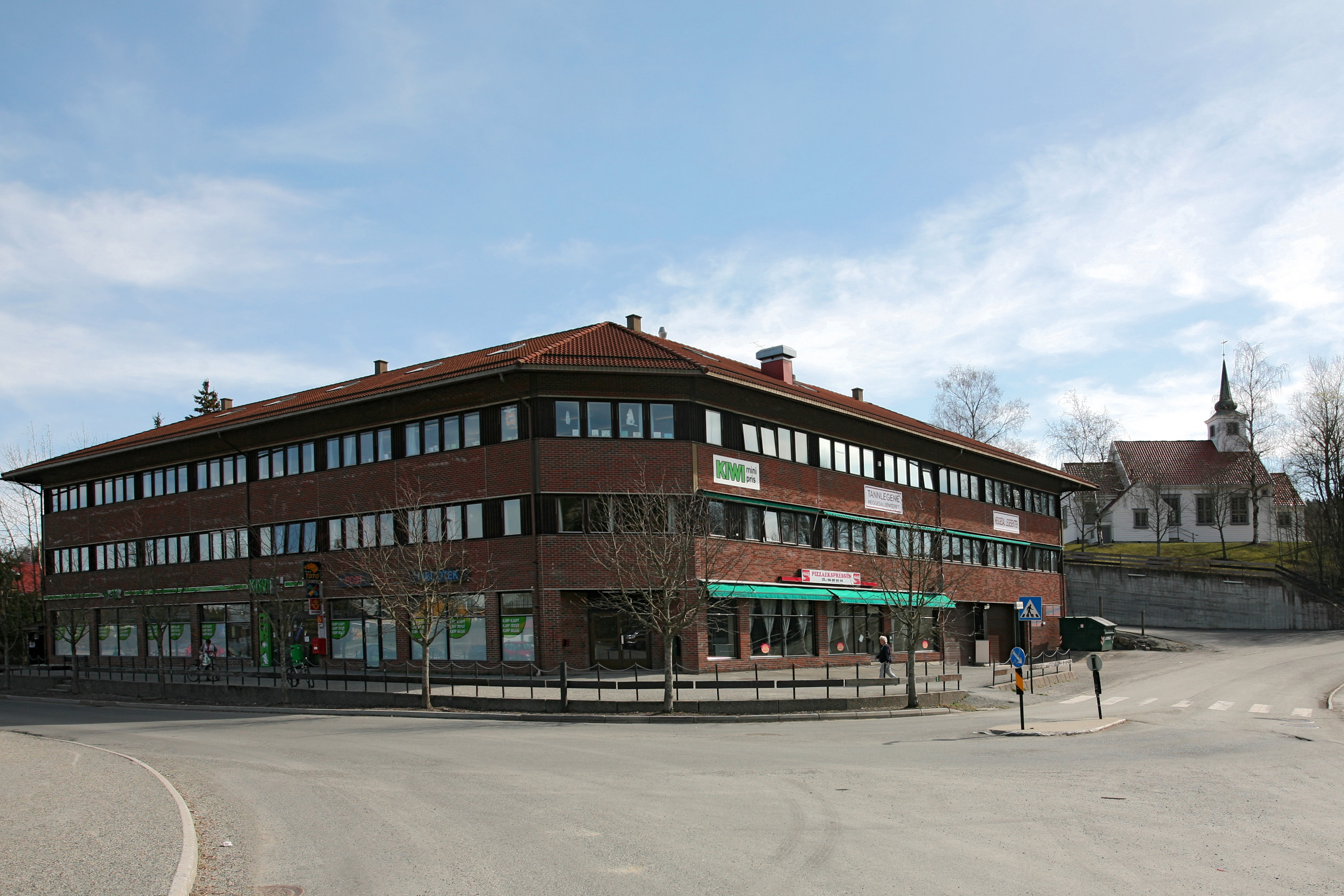
Kiwi store with Post Office.

Heggedal has a post office at the local chain store, Kiwi, and its postal code is 1389. There is also a local library, which was considered shut down in 2002, but a demonstration was staged to prevent this, to which 500 people attended - on the same day that the local newspaper, Asker og Bærums Budstikke, printed that a solution had been found.

The local school, Heggedal barneskole, was built in 1906, and expanded several times, most recently in 1960. As of autumn 2005, it has 362 pupils aged from 6 to 13 (first to seventh grade), and does not split the pupils into classes which they keep for the whole 7-year period in the school - instead, they are in working groups which may change from year to year or even more frequently.

Riksvei (state road) 167 which runs south-west to Røyken and Spikkestad runs through the area, and there are minor roads to the nearby coastal settlements of Vollen, Blakstad and Slemmestad. From the railway station on the Spikkestadbanen, the train runs from Spikkestad some kilometres to the south-west to Oslo in the north-east, and trains also run to Lillestrøm, also in Akershus county. There are also bus services to the centre of Asker.

== Sports ==
Heggedal IL, the local sports club, was founded in 1914. The men's association football team used to have a cooperation with the nearby Vollen UL, and played on the sixth level of the pyramid, but this stopped after the 2003 season. It also has volleyball teams for men and women (the women's team plays on the third level of the Norwegian pyramid, the men's team on the lowest level - the fourth), a cross-country skiing group and a "sport school" programme for the youngest children. In the 1960s, Nordic combined world champion Arne Larsen represented Heggedal IL. The local golf club, Heggedal Golfklubb, is run by the Vinnulstad Golf company, and currently has a driving range, although the municipality has regulated the area for a 9-hole course.
