= Brakerøya Station =

Railway station in Drammen, Norway

Brakerøya
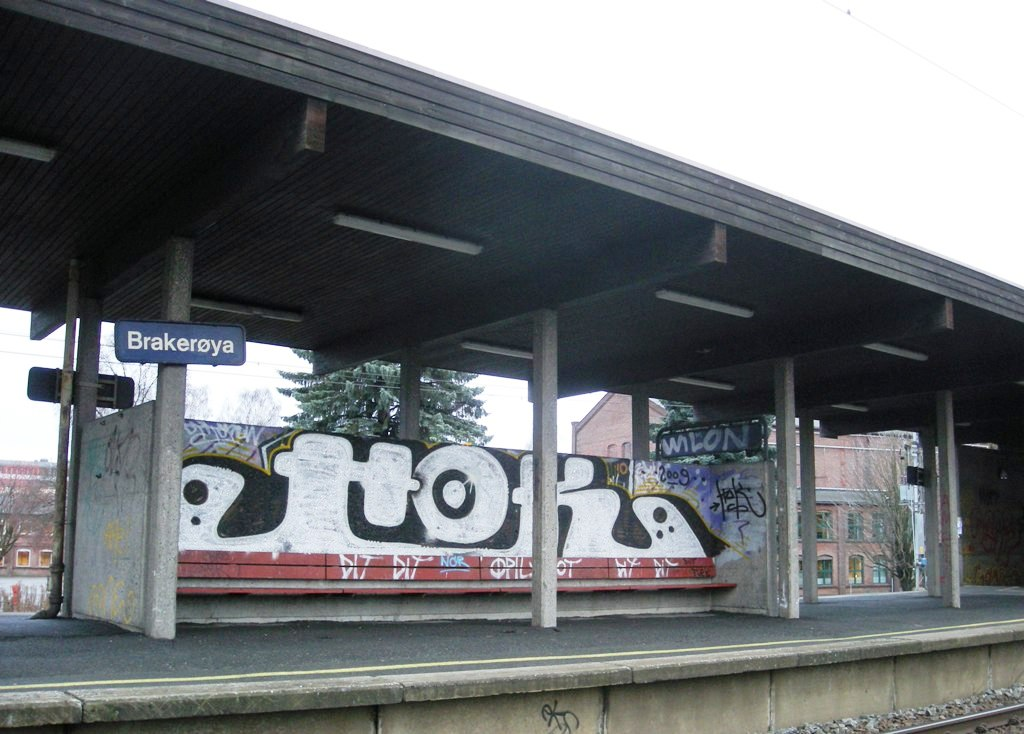
- Brakerøya station (2009)

General information
- Location: Brakerøya, Drammen; Norway
- Coordinates: 59°44′37.100″N 10°13′58.001″E
- Elevation: 3.4 m (11 ft)
- Owner: Bane NOR
- Operator: Vy
- Line: Drammen Line
- Distance: 50.76 km (31.54 mi)
- Platforms: 2

History
- Opened: 1873
Location

Brakerøya Station (Norwegian: Brakerøya stasjon) is a railway station located at the village of Brakerøya in Drammen, Norway on the Drammen Line. The station is served by the Oslo Commuter Rail L13 service with half-hour headway by Vy.

== History ==
The station was opened in 1873, one year after the Drammen Line. It was heavily rebuilt in 1973 when Lieråsen Tunnel was opened and a new double track from Lieråsen Tunnel to Brakerøya was built.

Preceding station			Following station
Drammen	Drammen Line		Lier
Preceding station	Local trains		Following station
Drammen	R13	Drammen–Oslo S–Dal	Lier
