= Skithegga =

River in Norway

Coordinates: 59.7528°N 10.4008°E

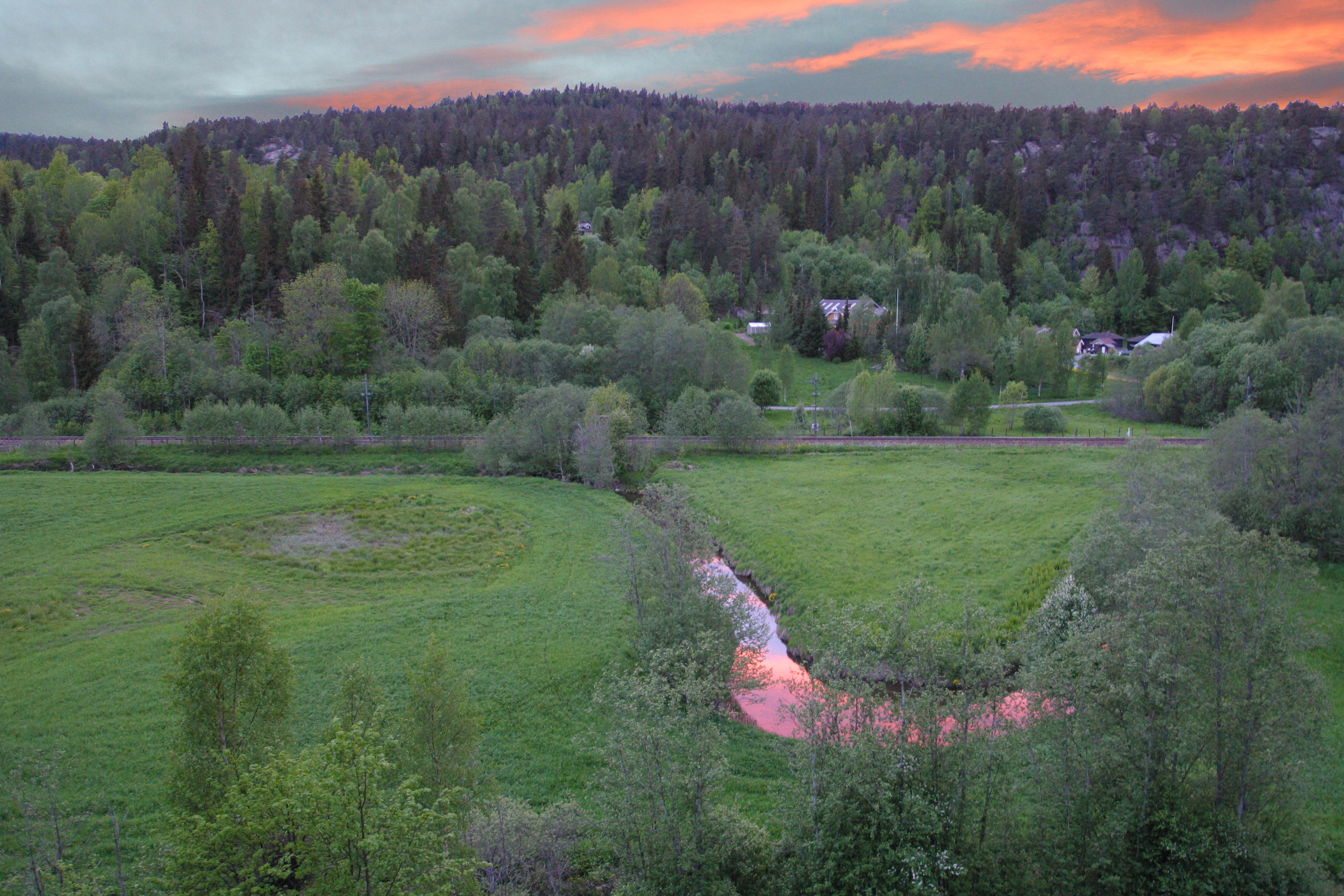
Skithegga near Hallenskog

Skithegga or Hegga is a small river running out of lake Gjellum in Norway. It starts further up in Kjekstadmarka at the lake Heggsjøen and runs through Asker and Hallenskog. The river normally has limited water, but during springtime it floods and put several farm areas under water.

The basis of the name is the tree hegg, hagberry, compounded with skit, dirt. The river name Hegga has given its name to the valley Heggedal which it runs through.
