= Røyken Station =

Railway station in Røyken, Norway

Røyken
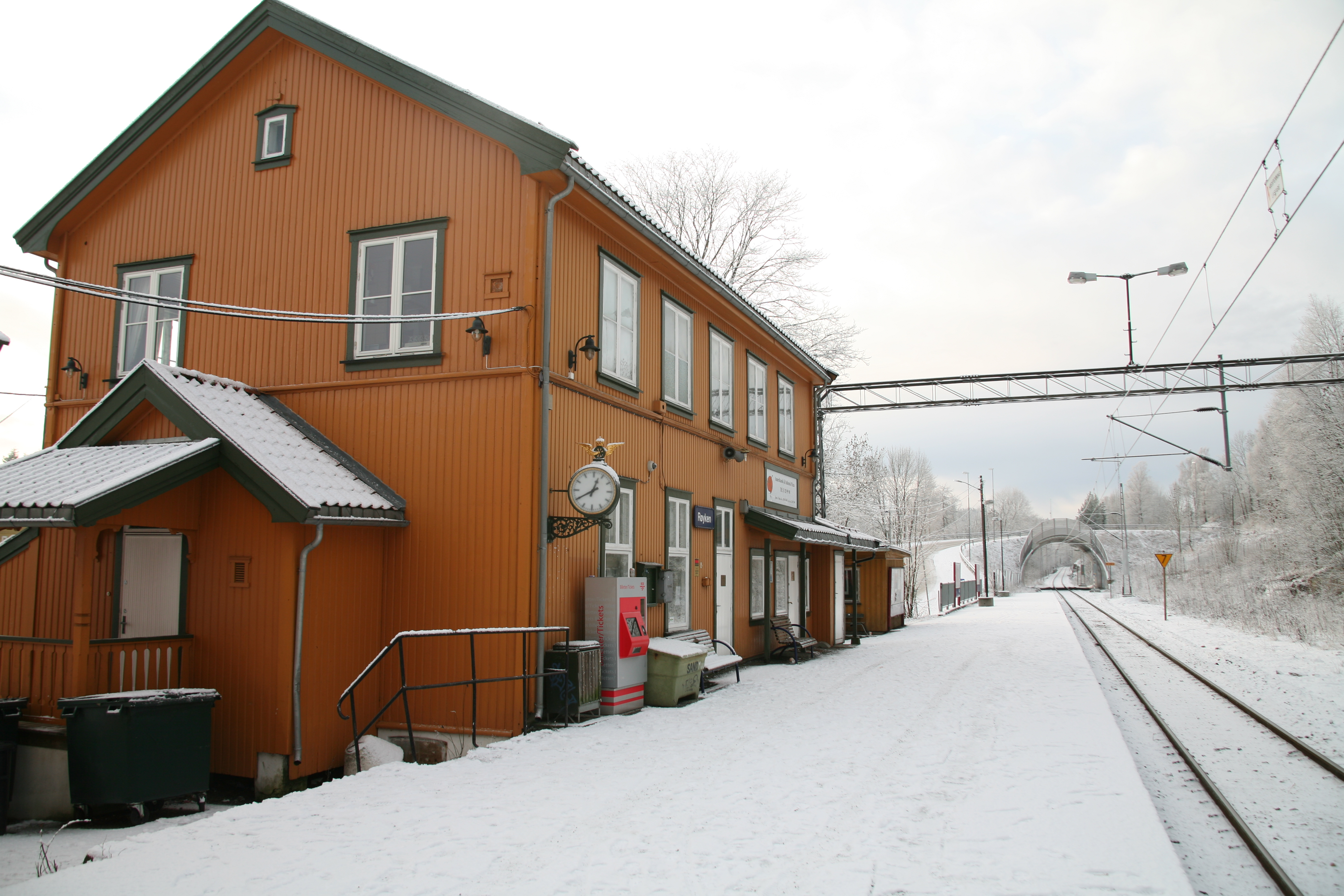

General information
- Location: Røyken, Røyken; Norway
- Coordinates: 59°44′48″N 10°23′23″E
- Owner: Bane NOR
- Operator: Vy
- Line: Spikkestad Line
- Distance: 33.63 km (20.90 mi)
- Platforms: 1

History
- Opened: 7 October 1872
Location

Røyken is a railway station on the Spikkestad Line and is located in Røyken, Norway. The station was opened as part of Drammenbanen in 1872 and was for many years the only railway station in Røyken. The station was located close the old Church in Røyken (from 1229).

The station is served by commuter trains to Oslo Central Station and onward to Lillestrøm. The distance to Oslo S is 33 kilometers (21 mi) and the travel time is 45 minutes.

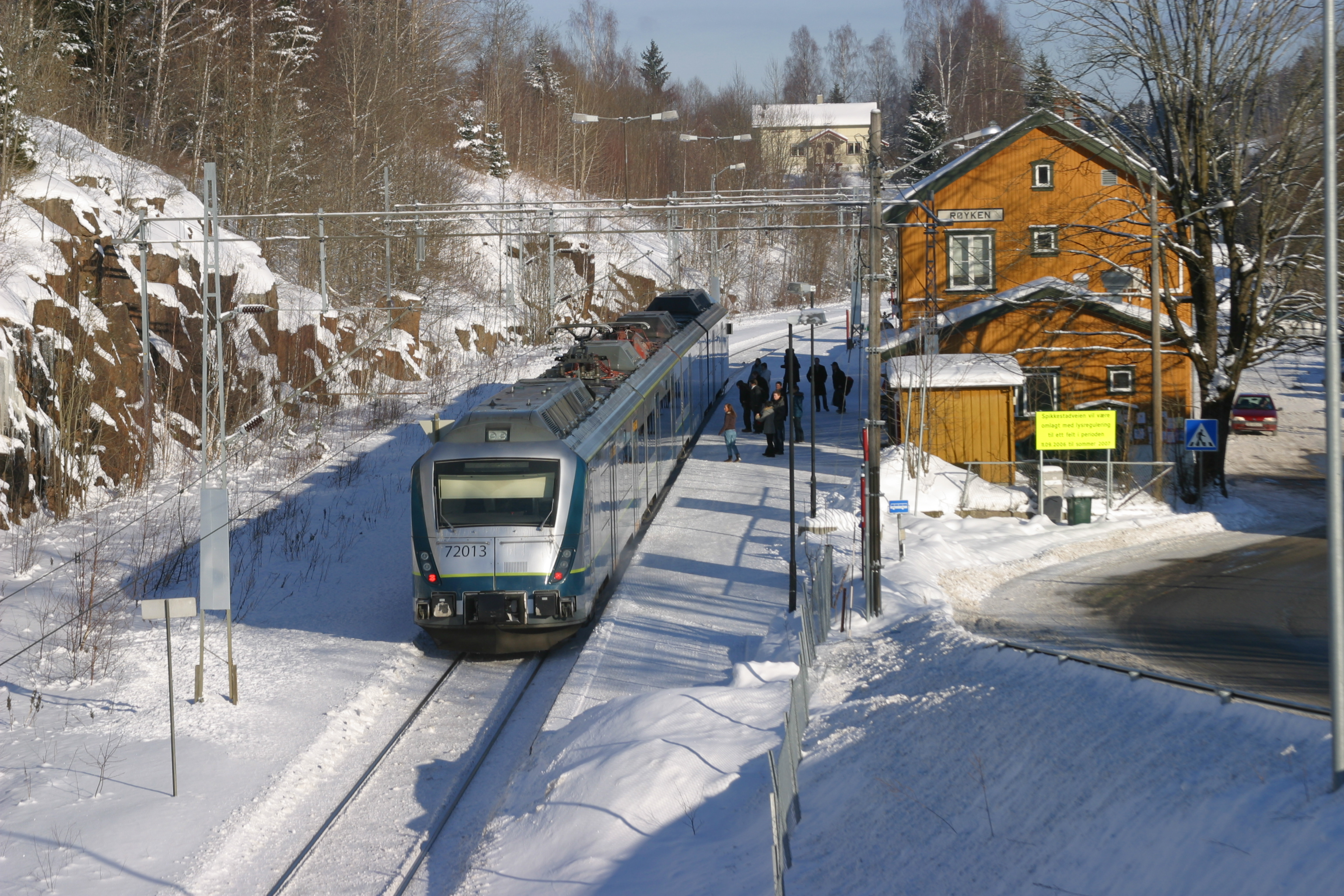
Local Class 72 train at the station

Preceding station			Following station
Spikkestad; Åsåker	Spikkestad Line		Heggedal; Hallenskog
Preceding station	Local trains		Following station
Spikkestad	L1	Spikkestad–Oslo S–Lillestrøm	Heggedal
