= Spikkestad =

Village in Asker municipality, Norway

Coordinates: 59°44′39.00″N 10°20′24.00″E

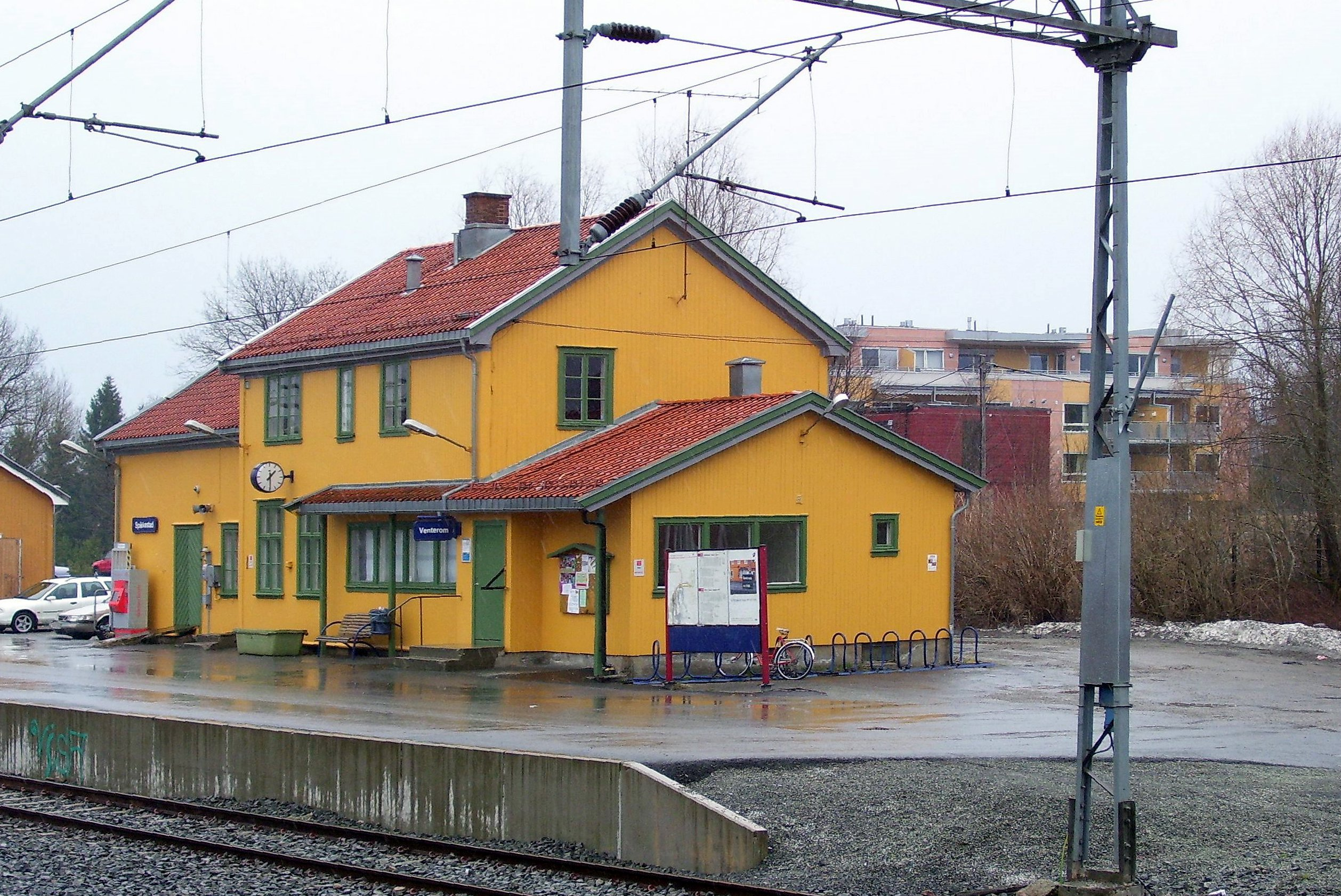
Spikkestad rail station

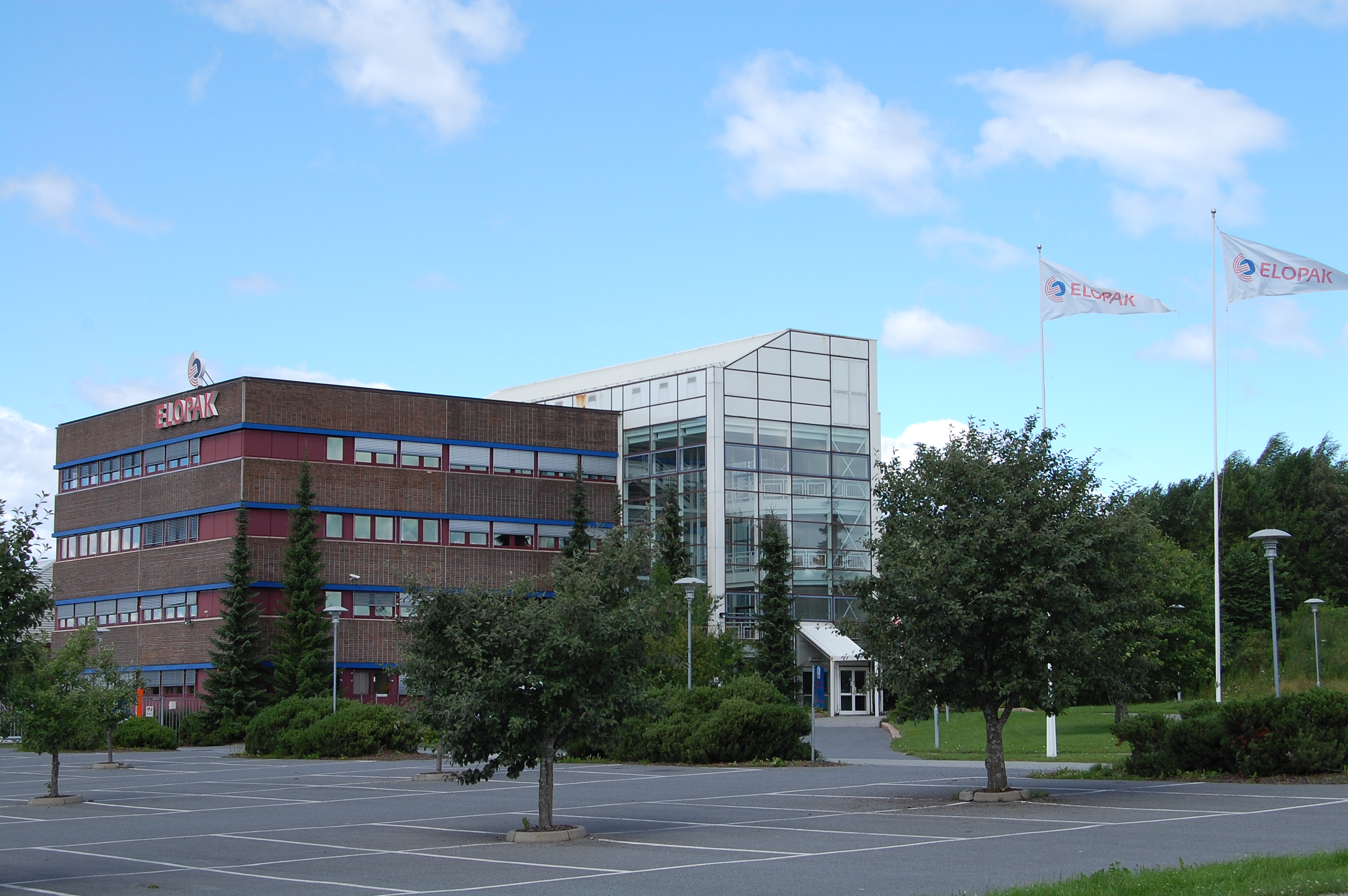
Elopak in Spikkestad

Spikkestad is a village in the municipality of Asker, in the province of Akershus, Norway. Its current population (2022) is between 4000 and 5000.

Spikkestad is located in the northern part of the peninsula of Hurumlandet, closer to the Drammensfjord than the Oslo Fjord. Spikkestad railway station was opened in 1885 to link Asker to Drammen. The village was named after the farm "Spikkestad", as the station was built on its lands. In the early 1970s, the Lieråsen tunnel was built 3 km to the North-West of the village, which made the trip between Oslo and Drammen much shorter. The segment of the train track between Spikkestad and Drammen was closed after the tunnel opened. Spikkestad thus became the terminus of Spikkestadbanen. However, there are still trains running between Asker and Spikkestad, every half-hour. Spikkestad is also well connected by road. The Norwegian National Road 23 (now European highway E134) runs through the outskirts of the village and the road provides links to Drammen and Drøbak. Drammen is the closest large city, only 11 km away from Spikkestad.

During the industrialization of the town at the end of the 19th century, factories and schools, as well as an influx of new inhabitants made the village into more than just a train station. The manufacturing company Elopak was founded in Spikkestad in 1957.

Spikkestad and the area surrounding it have a long history dating back to the Viking Age. Once a year, the community organizes an historic walk (Oldtidsveien), which travels along sites such as a historic burial site. It runs from Gullaug on the Drammen Fjord to Slemmestad on the Oslo Fjord.
