= Lier Station =

Railway station in Buskerud, Norway

Lier
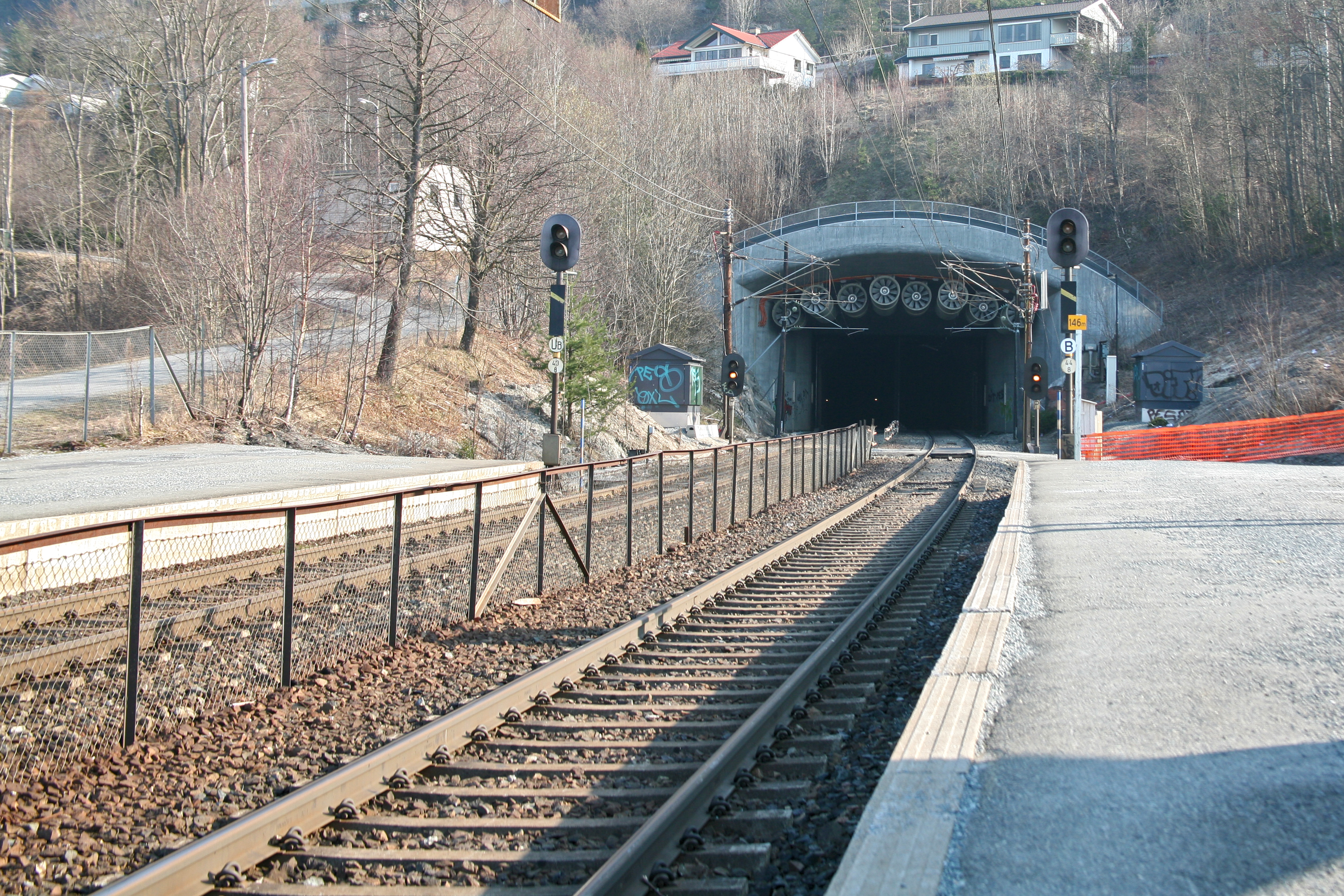
- Looking straight into Lieråsen Tunnel from Lier Station

General information
- Location: Lier, Lier; Norway
- Coordinates: 59°45′48.15″N 10°17′24.56″E
- Elevation: 3.4 m (11 ft)
- Owner: Bane NOR
- Operator: Vy
- Line: Drammen Line
- Distance: 46.84 km (29.11 mi)
- Platforms: 2
- Tracks: 2

History
- Opened: 1973
Location

Lier Station (Norwegian: Lier holdeplass) is located at the village of Lier, Norway on the railway Drammen Line. The station is served by the Oslo Commuter Rail L13, service with half-hour headway by Vy. The station is served by line L1, with one departure at 01:54 to Drammen.

== History ==
The station was opened in 1973 as Tuverud. The station is located just outside the mouth of Lieråsen Tunnel, and the station was opened as part of it. The former Lier Station was located on the track that is now part of the Spikkestad Line.

| Preceding station | | | Following station |
|---|---|---|---|
| Brakerøya | Drammen Line | | Asker |
| Preceding station | Local trains | | Following station |
| Brakerøya | R13 | Drammen–Oslo S–Dal | Asker |
