= Spikkestad Station =

Railway station in Røyken, Norway

Spikkestad
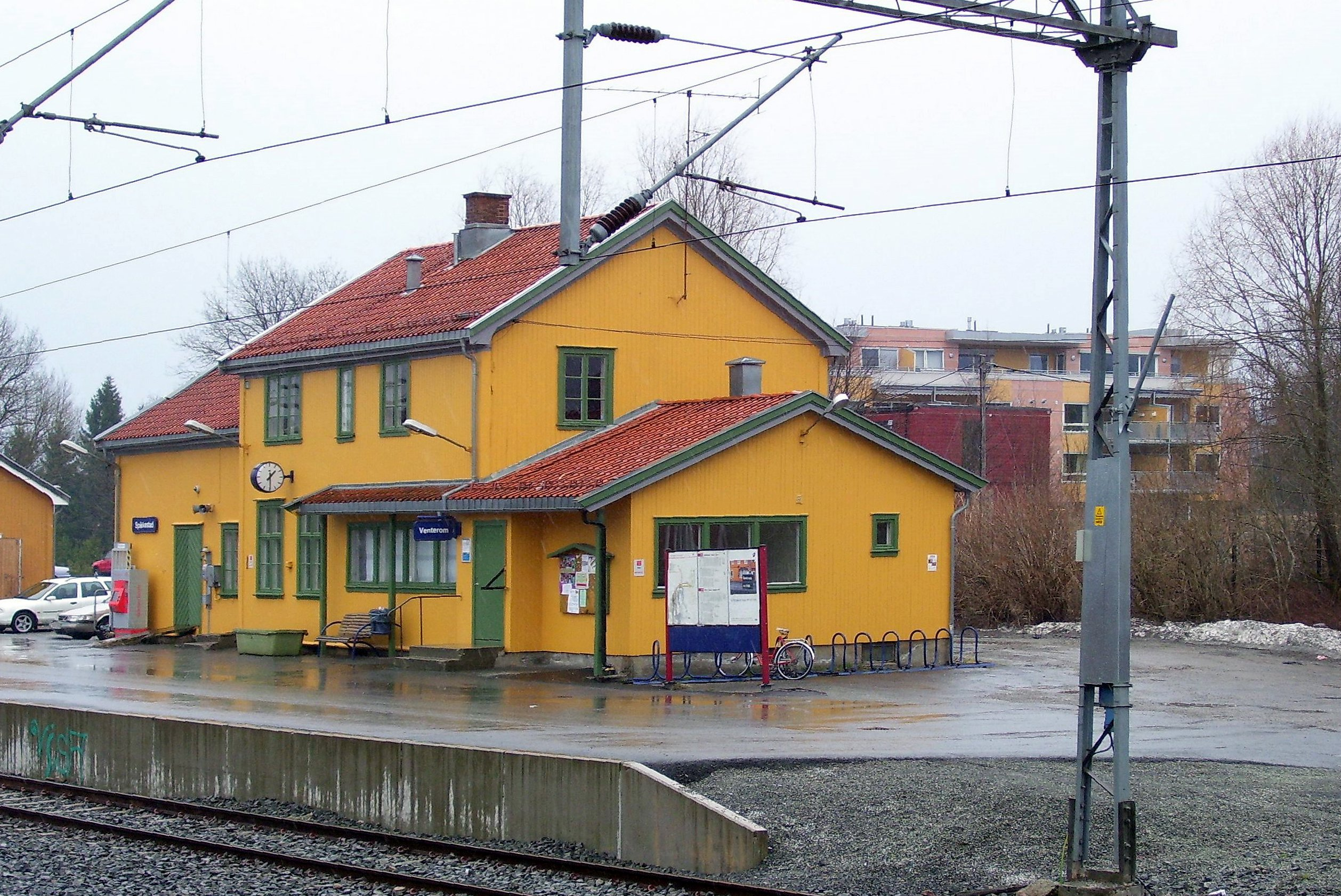
- Spikkestad old station building

General information
- Location: Spikkestad, Røyken, Norway
- Coordinates: 59°44′43″N 10°20′31″E
- Owner: Bane NOR
- Operator: Vy
- Line: Spikkestad Line
- Distance: 37.5 km (23.3 mi)
- Platforms: 2

History
- Opened: 3 February 1885
Location

Spikkestad Station (Norwegian: Spikkestad stasjon) is a railway station located at Spikkestad in Røyken, Norway, and is the terminus of the Spikkestad Line. It was opened as part of the Drammen Line on 3 February 1885, but in 1973 the new Lieråsen Tunnel opened through Lieråsen, and the old part of the Drammen Line became a commuter train line with Spikkestad, which is today primarily a residential town, as its western terminus.

The station is served by a half-hourly service of commuter trains running to Asker, Sandvika, and Oslo Central Station (journey time: 52 minutes) and then on to Lillestrøm.

The old station building, which was originally built to serve Høvik and was moved from there in 1922, today stands a hundred metres or so distant from the end of the line, following redevelopment of the station area in 2012-16 and the construction of new platforms.

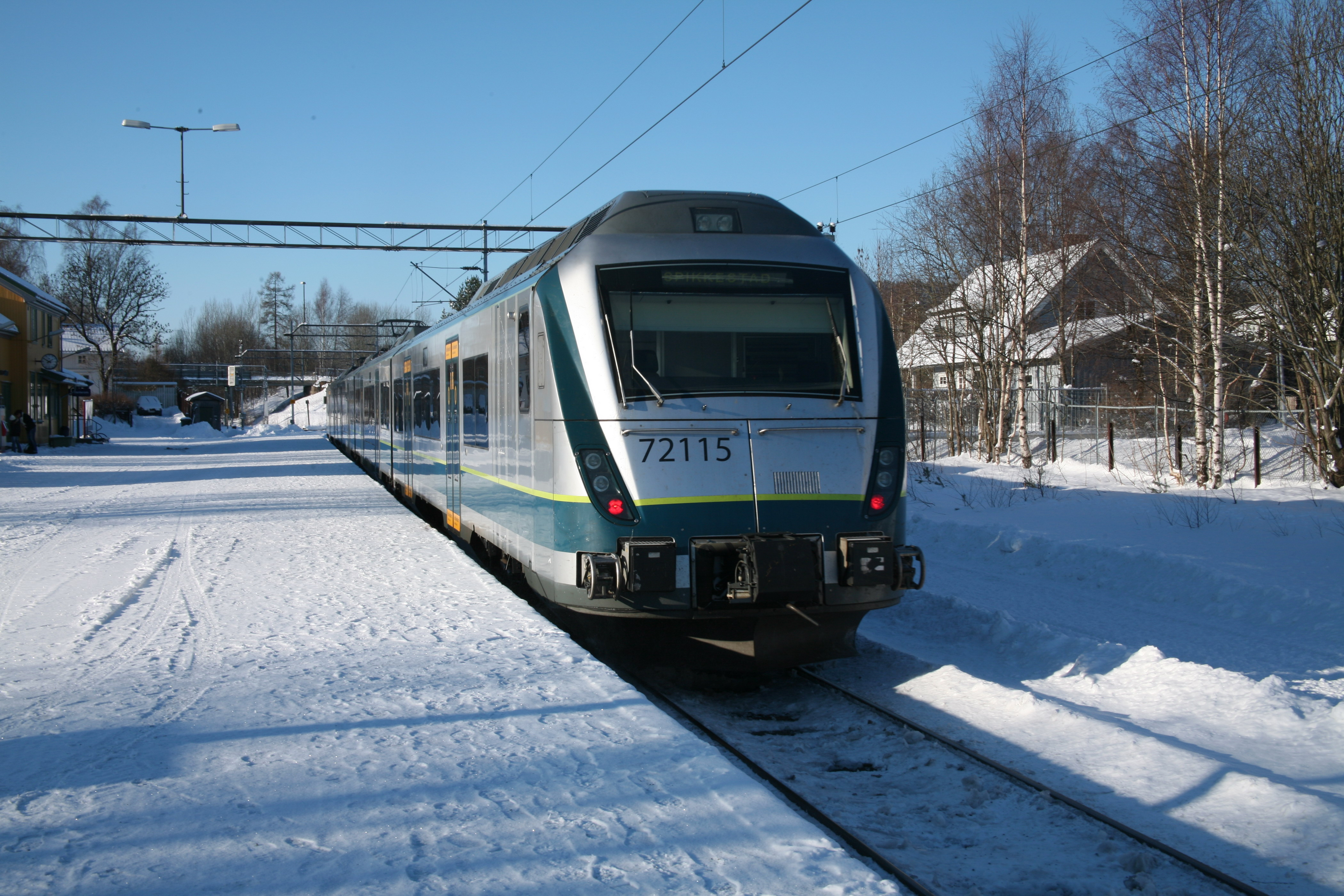
A local NSB Class 72 train at Spikkestad Station

| Preceding station | | | Following station |
|---|---|---|---|
| — | Spikkestad Line | | Røyken |
| Preceding station | Local trains | | Following station |
| — | L1 | Spikkestad–Oslo S–Lillestrøm | Røyken |
