= Lieråsen Tunnel =

Railway tunnel in Norway

Coordinates: 59°48′N 010°22′E

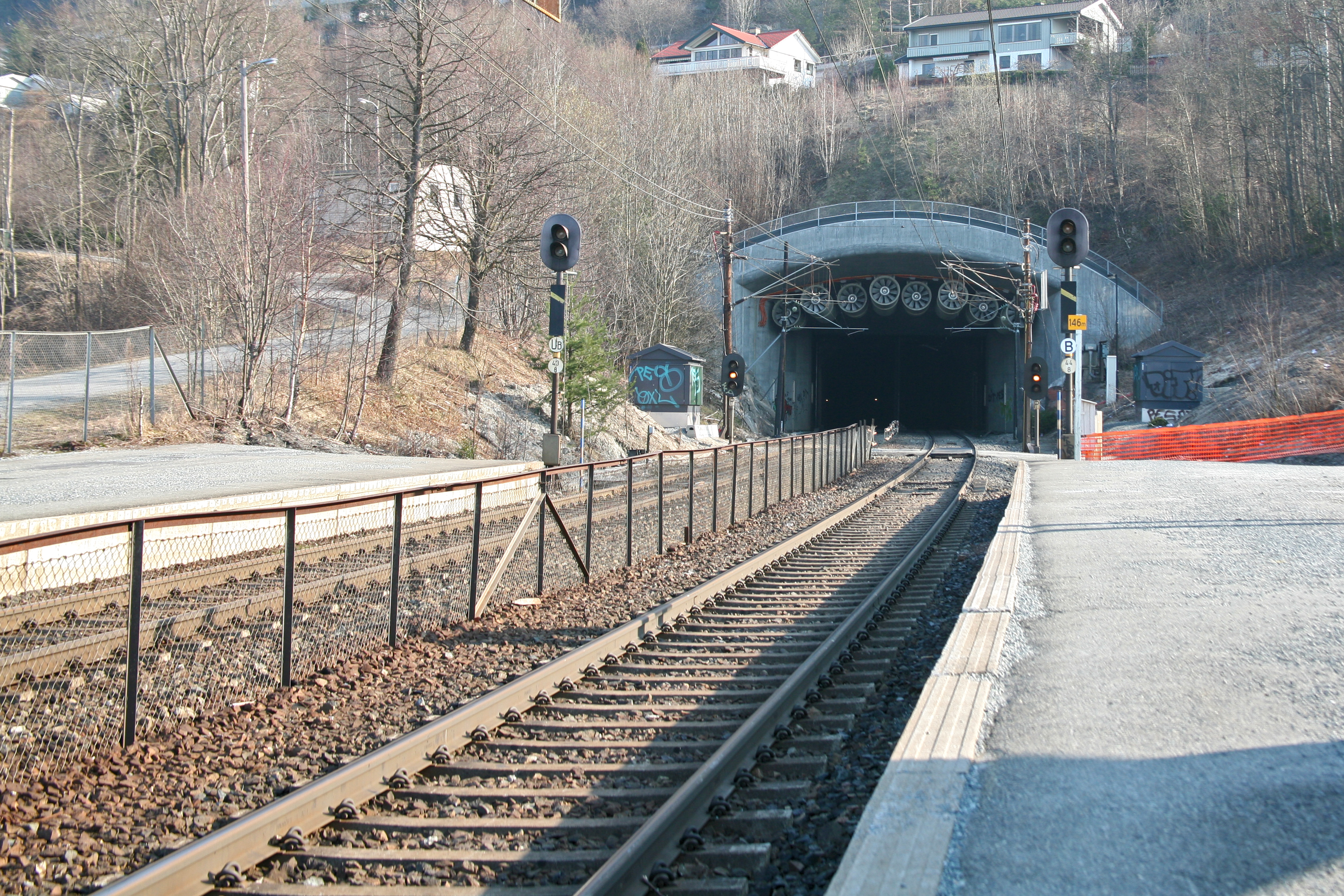
- The tunnel entrance seen from Lier Station
- Interactive map of Lieråsen Tunnel

Overview
- Line: Drammen Line
- Location: Asker and Lier, Norway
- System: Norwegian Railways
- Start: Asker Station
- End: Lier Station

Operation
- Opened: 3 June 1973
- Owner: Norwegian National Rail Administration

Technical
- Line length: 10,723 m (6.663 mi)
- No. of tracks: Double
- Track gauge: 1,435 mm (4 ft 8 1/2 in)
- Electrified: 15 kV 16.7 Hz AC
- Operating speed: 130 km/h (81 mph)

Lieråsen Tunnel is a single-tubed railway tunnel of the Drammen Line situated in Asker and Lier in Norway. At a length of 10.723 kilometers (6.663 mi), the double track tunnel is located immediately between Asker Station and Lier Station. It is used for a mix of short- and long-haul passenger trains and freight trains.

Construction of the tunnel commenced in 1962, along with a new section of track between the tunnel and Brakerøya Station. Inadequate geological surveys ahead of construction resulted in the tunnel being built in the middle of an altered and crushed zone, delaying construction and eventually shifting the route 300 meters (980 ft) to the southwest. The tunnel opened on 3 June 1973. In addition to providing double track, it shortened the Drammen Line by 12.4 kilometers (7.7 mi). Part of the old section of the Drammen Line became the Spikkestad Line, while the rest of line was closed. Lieråsen was the longest railway tunnel in the country until the Romerike Tunnel opened in 1999.

== Specifications ==
The Lieråsen Tunnel is 10.723 kilometers (6.663 mi) long and carries the double tracked, standard gauge Drammen Line between Asker Station and Lier Station. Running through the mountain of Lieråsen, it passes through the municipalities of Lier, Røyken and Asker. The line is electrified at 15 kV 16.7 Hz AC. At Eriksrud, 10.48 kilometers (6.51 mi) from Asker Station, there is a switch allowing trains to change track.

The tunnel has a surface profile of 70 square meters (750 sq ft). The speed is limited to 130 km/h (81 mph). This is caused by the limited profile, which creates a pressure wave when trains meet, even though the infrastructure and curvature would allow for higher speeds. Starting 1.5 kilometers (0.93 mi) from the Lier end the tunnel has a slight S-curve with a radius of 1.5 kilometers (0.93 mi).

== History ==
=== Planning ===
When the Drammen Line opened on 7 October 1872, it was 53.1 kilometers (33.0 mi) long. This was originally a narrow gauge railway, but it was converted to standard gauge and electrified in 1922. The line was S-shaped between Drammen and Asker, first heading northwards to Lier, where it connected to the Lier Line. It then headed south to Røyken and then northwards again to Asker. The reason for this route was the need to limit the gradient of the line to accommodate freight trains. Specifically, there is a steep slope just west of Spikkestad with a height difference of about 100 meters (330 ft) in comparison to the lower areas below. This height difference forced the line to take the detour.

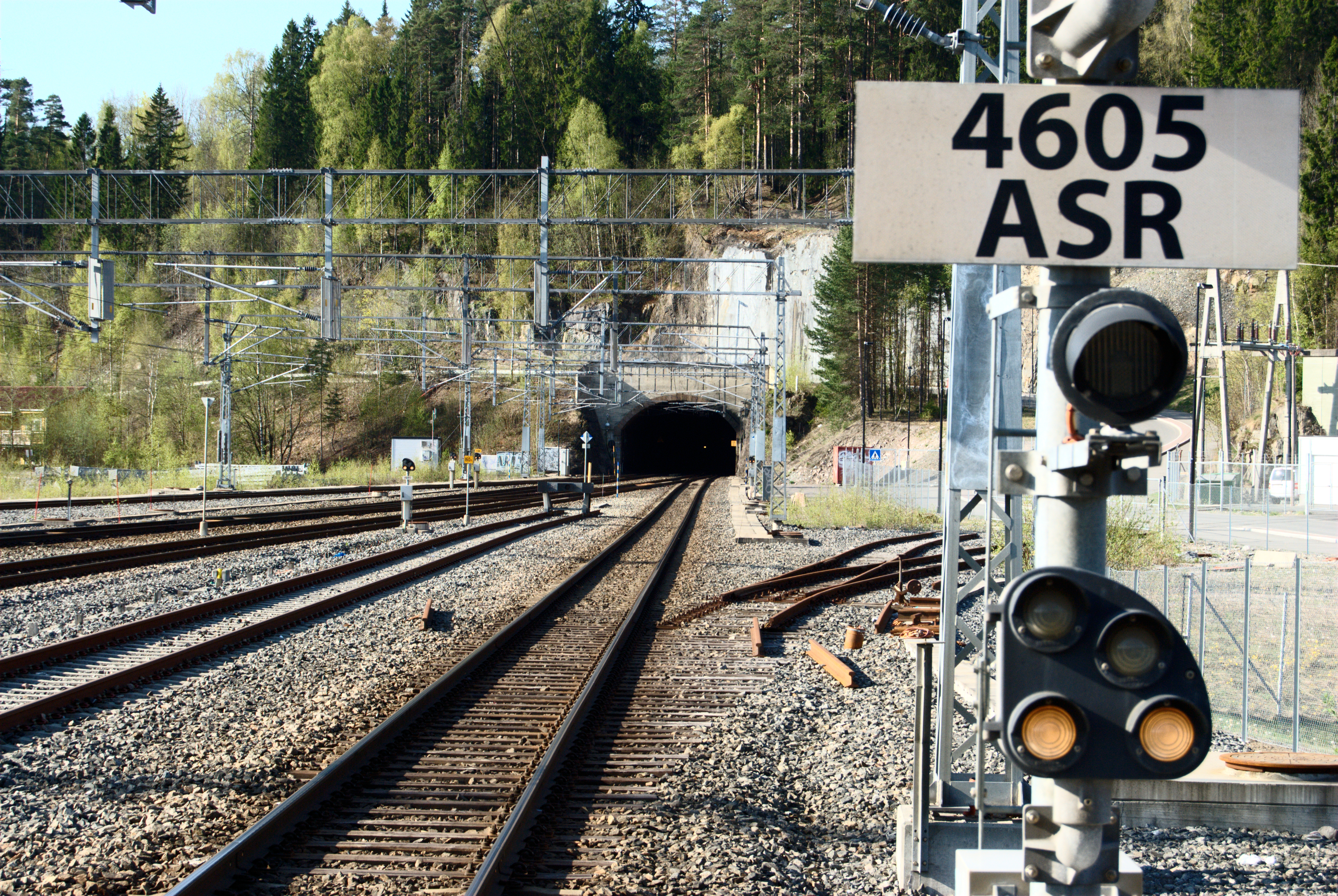
The tunnel seen from Asker Station

The Lieråsen Tunnel was launched as a project to cut distance and travel times between Asker and Drammen, as the Drammen Line was nearly twice the length compared to a straight line. The first proposals were developed by the Norwegian State Railways (NSB) in the early 1940s, albeit at first for a single track. During the process of double tracking the Drammen Line between Asker and Sandvika, NSB launched a proposal to build two additional sections of double track, one from Hokksund to Drammen and one from Brakerøya to Asker. For the latter two main proposals were made: one which would run from the old Lier Station to Asker and a shorter direct tunnel. The advantage of the former was the ability to still serve Lierbyen and smaller construction costs, while the latter would give a shorter overall line length. NSB called for prioritizing the Drammen–Hokksund segment if there was not funding for both.

=== Construction ===
Construction involved building a new at-grade line from Brakerøya Station to a new Lier Station and subsequently a new tunnel through Lieråsen to Asker. Lieråsen is a granite massif and was regarded to be simple area to work in. The planning was carried out with limited geological surveys. Construction started in 1963, but it was soon discovered that there were long altered zones running through the area where the tunnel was to run. Specifically, a 2-kilometer (1.2 mi) long crushed zone was located there.

After two years the route was therefore shifted about 300 meters (980 ft) to the southeast to avoid these zones. This resulted in a slight S-curve on the Lier end. Construction continued slowly, as nearly the entire length of the tunnel needed to be reinforced with concrete. By 1966 the cost estimate for the tunnel reached NOK 454 million, up from 64 million in 1959. Break-through of the main tunnel took place in October 1971. The price ended at NOK 175 million and construction employed up to 250 people on the site. Two workers were killed and two seriously wounded due to a blasting accident on 23 June 1972.

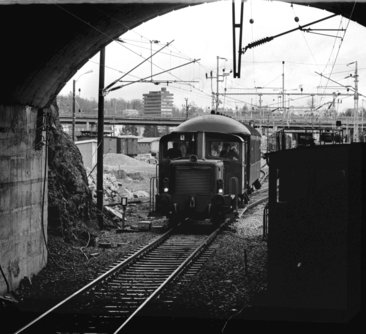
Opening of the tunnel

The opening of the tunnel on 3 June 1973 resulted in a shortening of the Drammen Line by 12,438 meters (7.729 mi), cutting the distance from Drammen Station to the then terminus of Oslo West Station to 40.5 kilometers (25.2 mi). Travel time from Drammen to Oslo was also cut, from between 55 and 50 minutes to 30. This allowed for the new Class 69 commuter trains to be put into service on the Drammen Line. The time saving also targeted the trains on the Vestfold Line and the Sørlandet Line. Part of the financing of the tunnel was channeled from a surcharge which NSB imposed on all tickets running through Lieråsen.

A major discussion arose regarding the use of the old track between Asker and Drammen. That part of the line remained single track. Three main proposals were made: closing down that line entirely, keeping it for local traffic and only keeping the part closest to Asker. The traffic was characterized by a high portion of rush-hour traffic between Røyken and Oslo, and a more even traffic through the day from Røyken to Drammen. The compromise was selected, whereby the 13 kilometers (8 mi) from Asker to Spikkestad Station was kept and named the Spikkestad Line, while the remaining 14 kilometers (9 mi) were closed on the same day the Lieråsen Tunnel opened.

=== Upgrades ===
A short-coming in the tunnel's design was the lack of any lighting, emergency exits or water deviation. Specifically, the lighting made inspection difficult. This was especially important since there was nothing hindering water from dripping down on the tracks, electrical systems and signaling system. This oftentimes caused cracks in the rails and ties. Poor geological conditions resulted in a net being hung up over the rails to hinder rocks from falling down. The decay was so hard that it was often not possible for NSB to keep up with maintenance. A total replacement of the railway's superstructure was therefore necessary in the early 1990s.

As of 1995 there were 97 daily trains carrying 13,000 passengers running through the tunnel. Tunnel safety in case of a fire was also a concern as there were originally no emergency fire exits. Should a fire take place mid-way through the tunnel, there would be no possibility to rescue and fire crews to attend the site. As a result, the tunnel received an upgrade in 2003, where a 390-meter (1,280 ft) crosscut was built, an improved ventilation system was installed, along with other upgrades for NOK 800 million. The most expensive part of this was the need for upgrades to the concrete, where water had started to corrode the reinforcements.

The National Rail Administration and the government are working on plans for a future high-speed railway which would include upgrading the Vestfold Line to 250 kilometers per hour (160 mph). There are no plans for upgrades between Drammen and Oslo, which would make the Lieråsen Tunnel a bottleneck in the new system.

== Bibliography ==
- Bjerke, Thor; Holom, Finn (2004). Banedata 2004 (in Norwegian). Hamar / Oslo: Norsk Jernbanemuseum / Norsk Jernbaneklubb. ISBN 82-90286-28-7.
- Ministry of Transport and Communications (6 February 1970). Røykenbanen. Norges offentlige utredninger (NOU) (in Norwegian).
- Monsen, Harald (23 June 2006). Utvikling av eksisterende bane og planlegging av ny bane på strekningen Asker–Spikkestad–Drammen (PDF) (in Norwegian). Norwegian University of Science and Technology.
- Palmstrøm, Arild (October 2003). Riktig omfang av undersøkelser for berganlegg (PDF) (in Norwegian). Norwegian Public Roads Administration.
