= Spikkestad Line =

Norwegian railway line

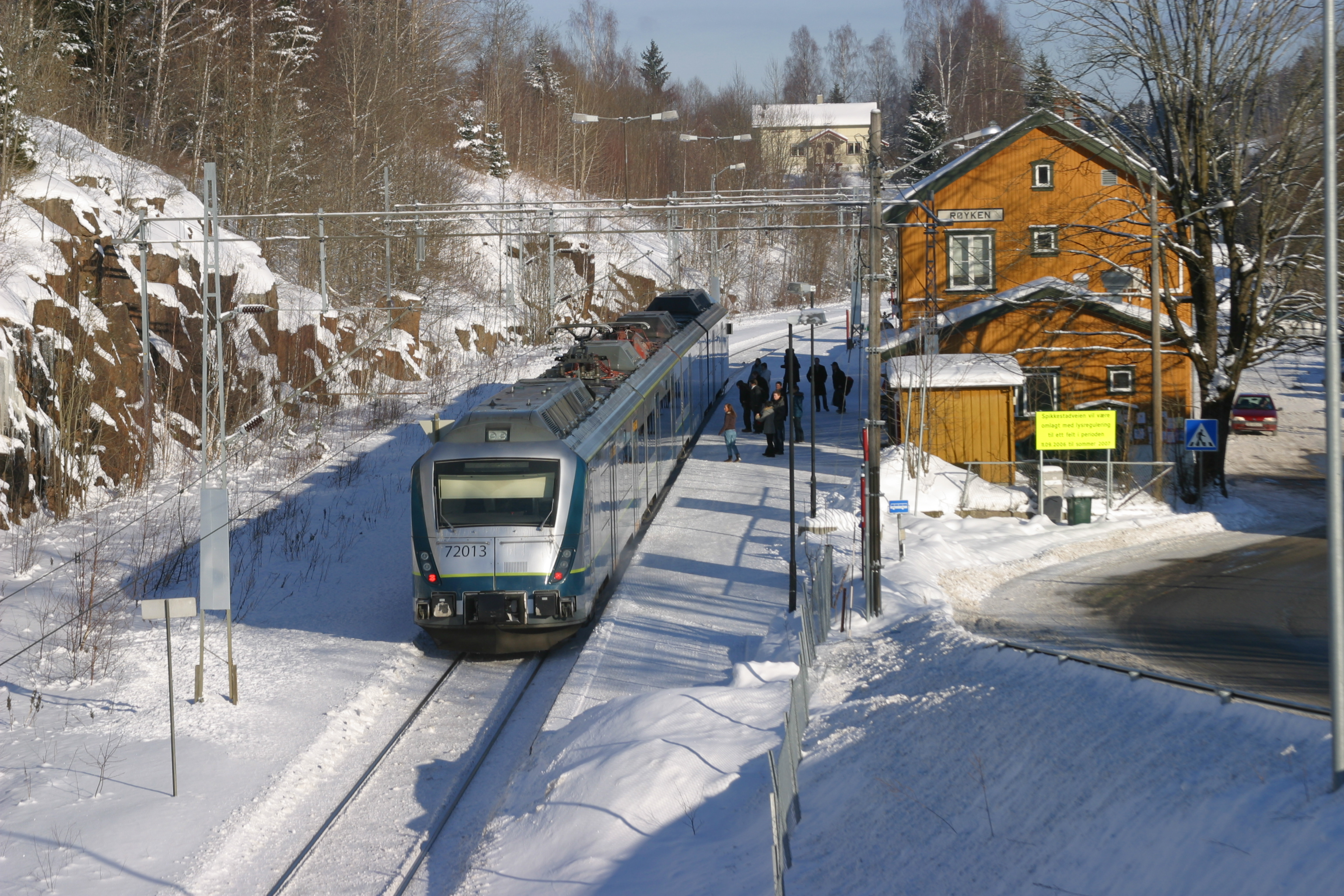
- Røyken Station on Spikkestadbanen, featuring an NSB BM72 unit.

Overview
- Owner: Bane NOR
- Termini: Asker; Spikkestad
- Stations: 8

Service
- Type: Railway
- System: Norwegian railway
- Operator(s): Vy
- Rolling stock: Class 72

History
- Opened: 1872

Technical
- Line length: 14 km (8.7 mi)
- Number of tracks: Single
- Character: Commuter trains
- Track gauge: 1,435 mm (4 ft 8 1/2 in)
- Electrification: 15 kV 16.7 Hz AC

The Spikkestad Line (Norwegian: Spikkestadbanen) is a 14 kilometre long railway line between Asker and Spikkestad in Norway. It was originally part of the Drammen Line between Oslo and Drammen which was built in 1872. In 1973, Lieråsen Tunnel was built to shorten the Drammen Line, and much of the old line was closed down. The last train on the section between Spikkestad and Drammen ran on 2 June 1973. However, the stretch between Asker and Spikkestad was kept as a branch line for local commuter traffic.

== Pictures of stations on Spikkestadbanen ==
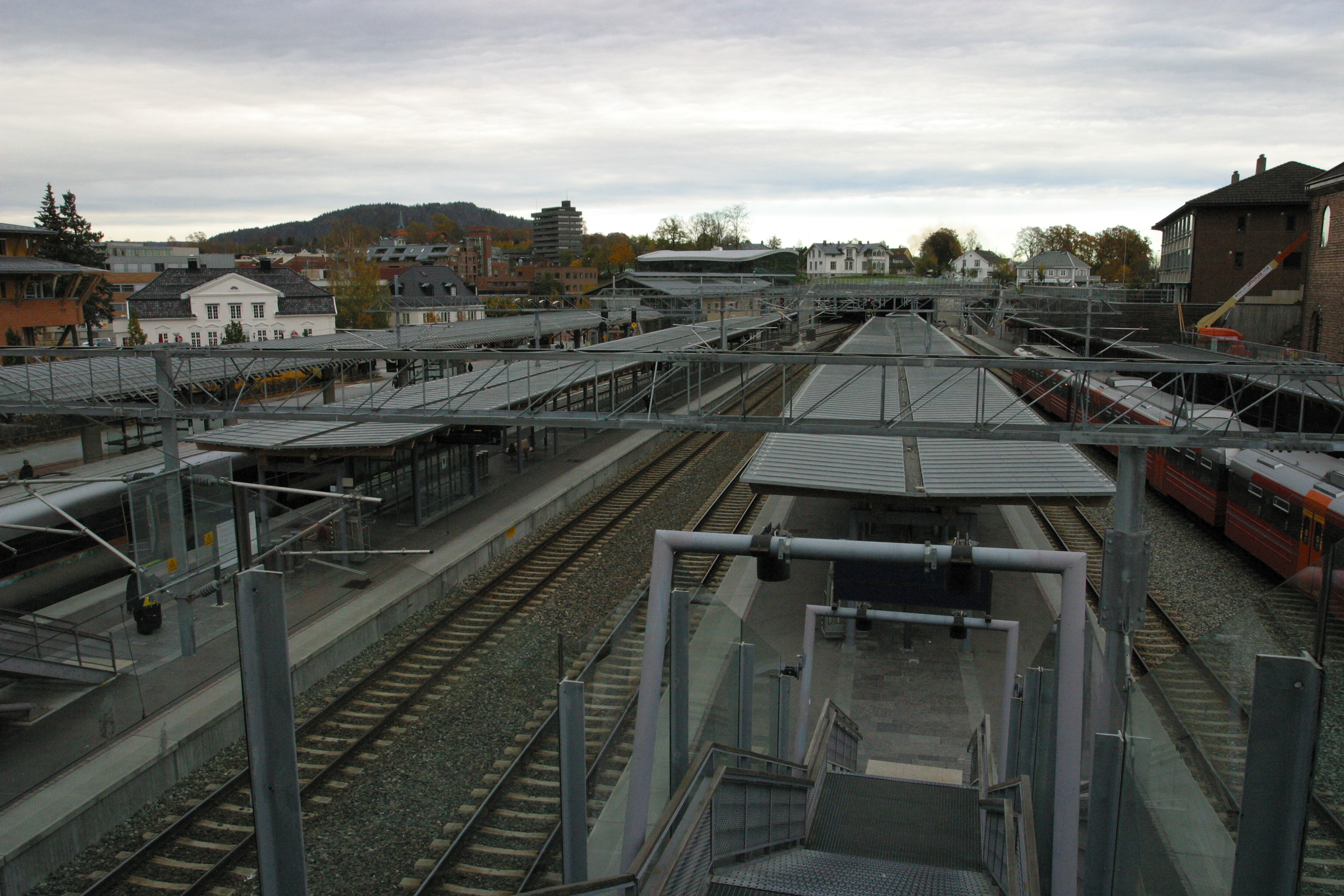
Asker station

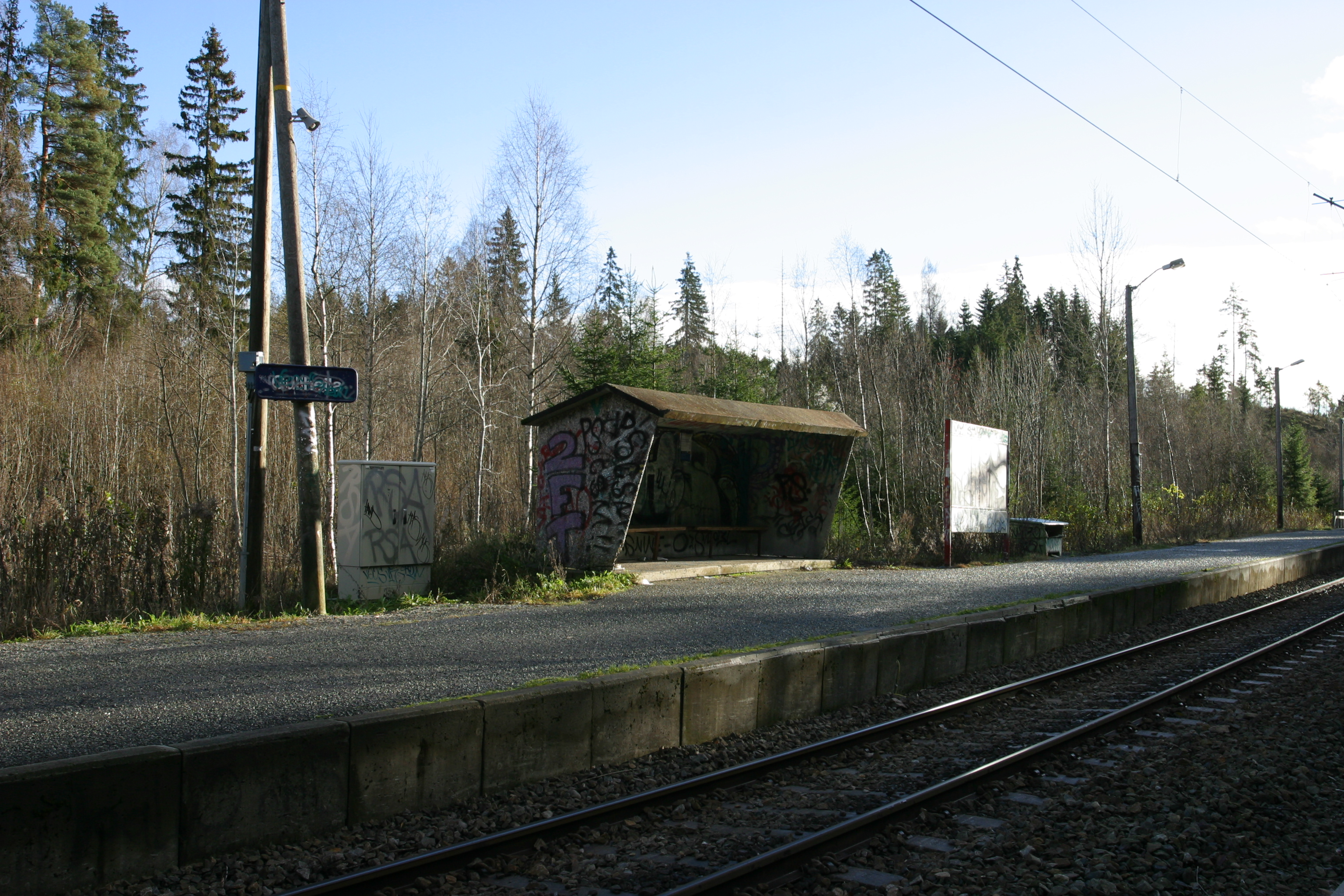
Gullhella train stop
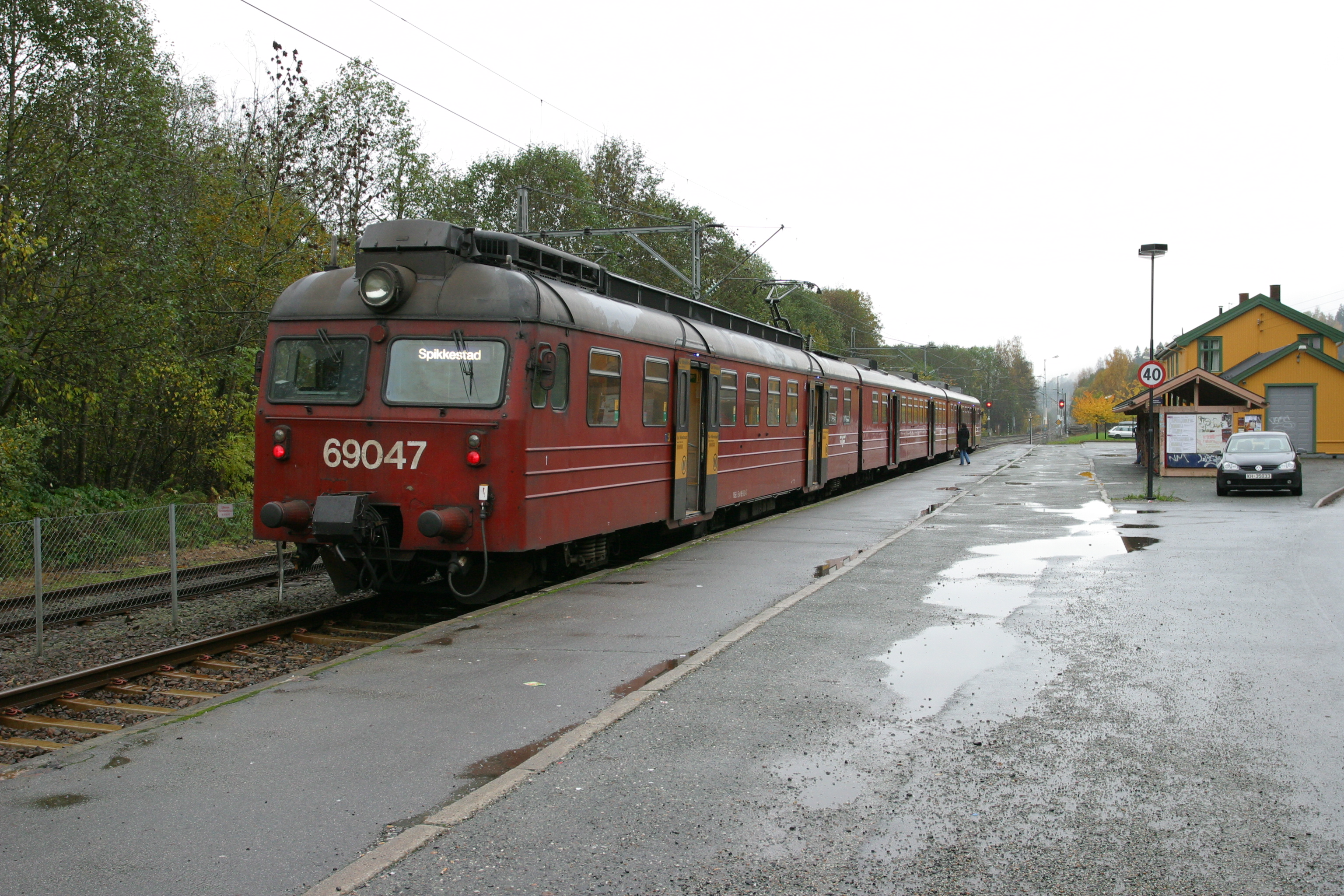
Heggedal station

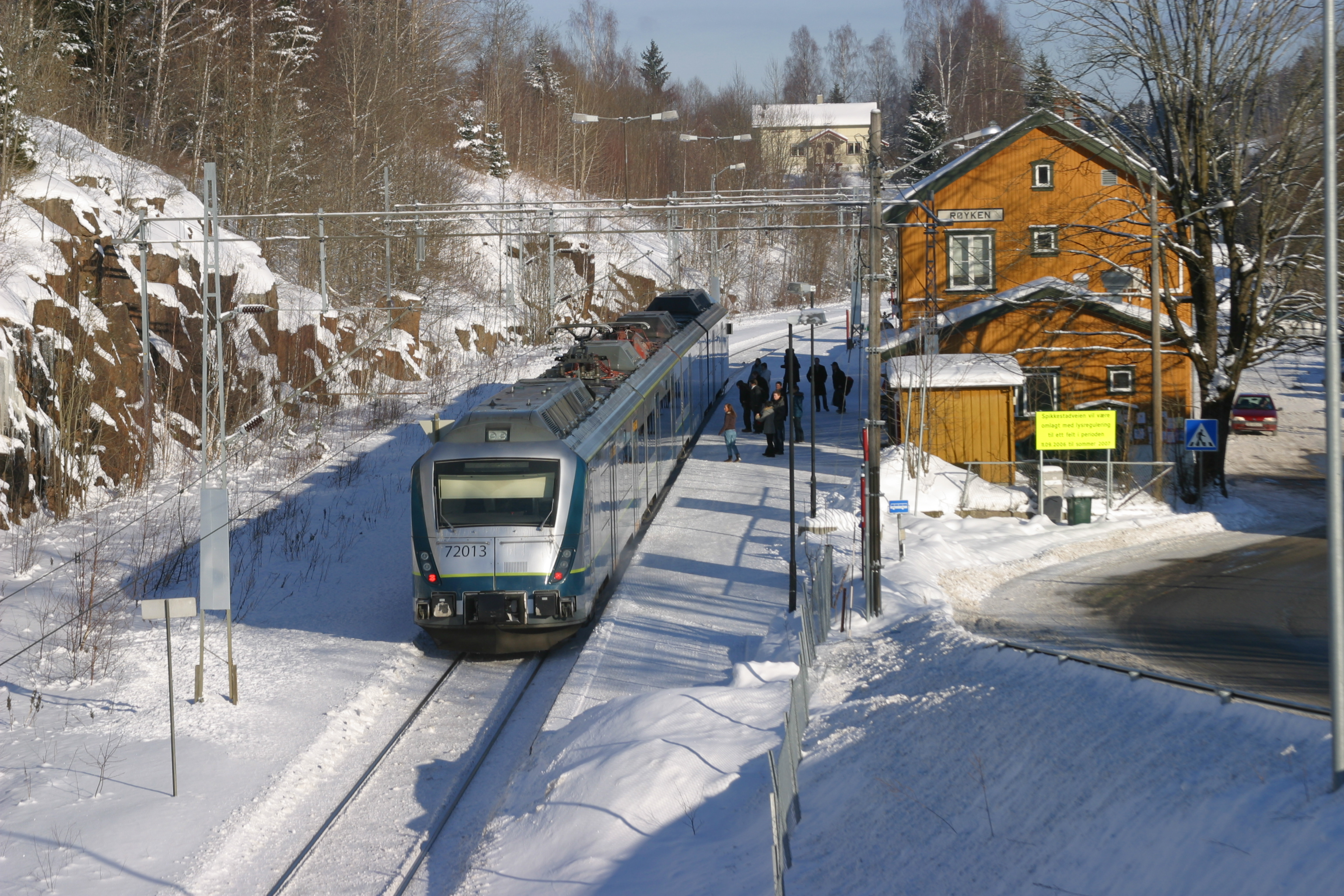
Røyken station
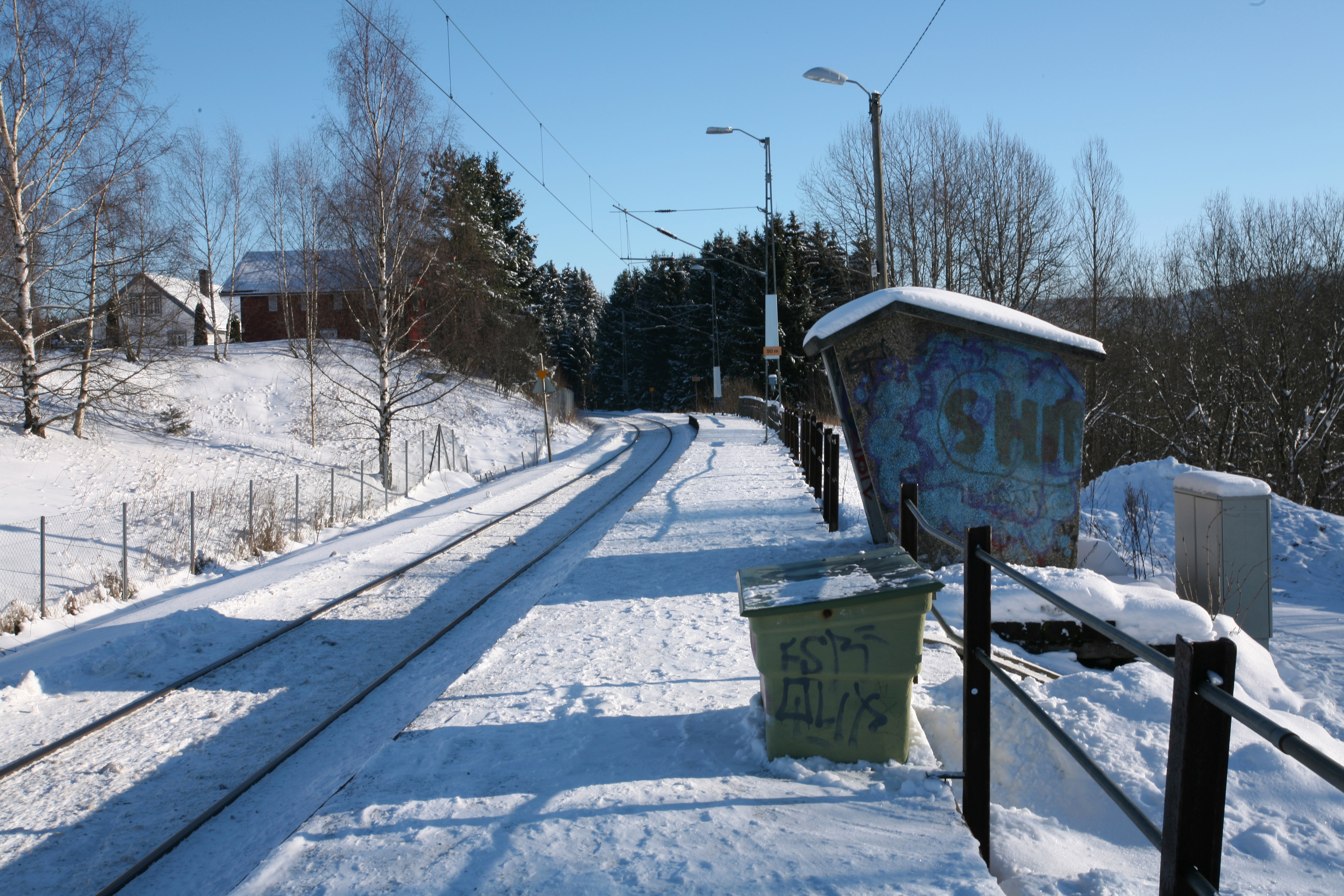
Åsåker train stop

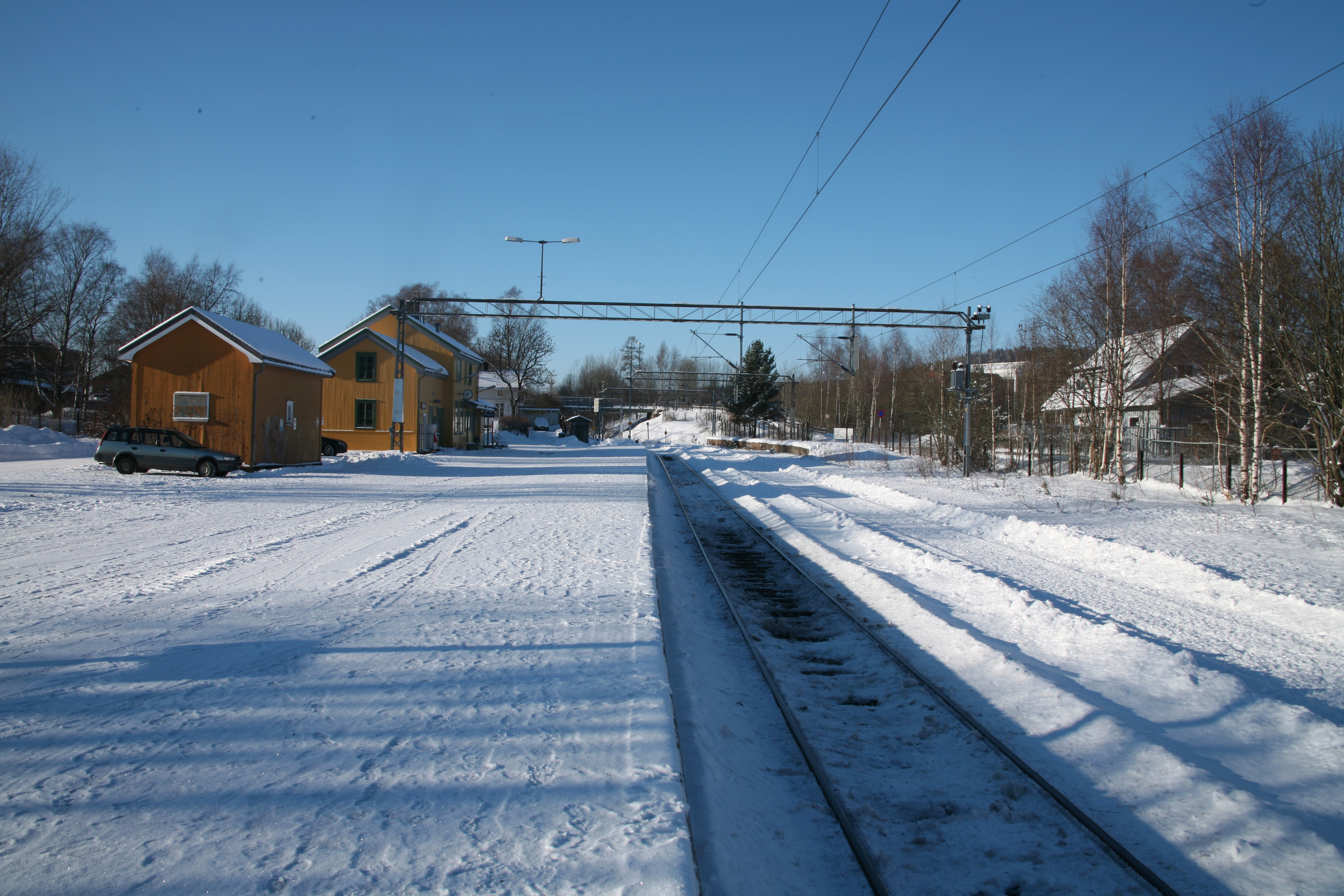
Spikkestad station
