= Tanum Tunnel =

Double-track railway tunnel on the Asker Line,

- Interactive map of Tanum Tunnel

Overview
- Line: Asker Line
- Location: Asker and Bærum, Norway
- Coordinates: 59.8804°N 10.4777°E
- System: Norwegian railway network
- Start: Jong, Bærum
- End: Årstad, Asker

Operation
- Opened: 27 August 2005
- Owner: Bane NOR
- Operator: Airport Express Train; Go-Ahead Norge; Vy
- Character: Express trains

Technical
- Line length: 3,590 m (2.23 mi)
- No. of tracks: Double
- Track gauge: 1,435 mm (4 ft 8 1/2 in)
- Electrified: 15 kV 16.7 Hz AC
- Operating speed: 160 km/h (100 mph)

Tanum Tunnel (Norwegian: Tanumtunnelen) is 3,590-meter-long (2.23 mi) double-track railway tunnel on the Asker Line, between Jong in Bærum and Åstad in Asker, Norway. It was built as part of the first stage of the Asker Line, between Asker and Sandvika; construction started in February 2002 and the tunnel opened on 27 August 2005. The tunnel was built by AF Gruppen for the Norwegian National Rail Administration. Most of the tunneling was conducted using the drilling and blasting method, although the easternmost 800 meters (2,600 ft) were built using the cut-and-cover method. After the tunnel opened, there have been problems with leaks damaging the superstructure. The tunnel has double track, is electrified and allows for a maximum speed of 160 kilometers per hour (100 mph). The cost to build the tunnel, excluding the superstructure, was 370 million Norwegian krone (NOK). The tunnel will accelerate intercity and regional traffic west of Oslo and free up capacity for the Oslo Commuter Rail on the Drammen Line.

== Specifications ==
The Tanum Tunnel is 3,590 meters (11,778 ft) long and has a cross section varying between 105 and 115 square meters (1,130 and 1,240 sq ft). The tunnel consists of a 2,718-meter-long (8,917 ft) blasted section and an 800-meter-long (2,600 ft), cut-and-cover section—the latter the easternmost part of the tunnel. It carries the double-tracked Asker Line between Jong and Åstad. The tunnel runs mostly through Cambrian-Silurian sedimentary slate, nodular limestone and shale, with local occurrences of Permian igneous rock. There is also a 400-meter-long (1,300 ft) section of less stable sedimentary rock in the Asker Group. The tunnel had a cover most of the way of between 50 and 100 meters (160 and 330 ft); however at Billingstad there was a much lower margin, laying for the most at 10 to 15 meters (33 to 49 ft) and at the least at 1.5 meters (4 ft 11 in). At Åstad, the line runs 600 meters (2,000 ft) in the open before entering the Skaugum Tunnel. The line is electrified at 15 kV 16.7 Hz AC and allows a maximum speed of 160 kilometres per hour (100 mph). The tunnel has frost insulation 300 meters (980 ft) into the tunnel form each end. The tunnel has frost fans which ensure that the air stays put in the middle of the tunnel, thus hindering cold air from flowing past the frost isolation.

== History ==
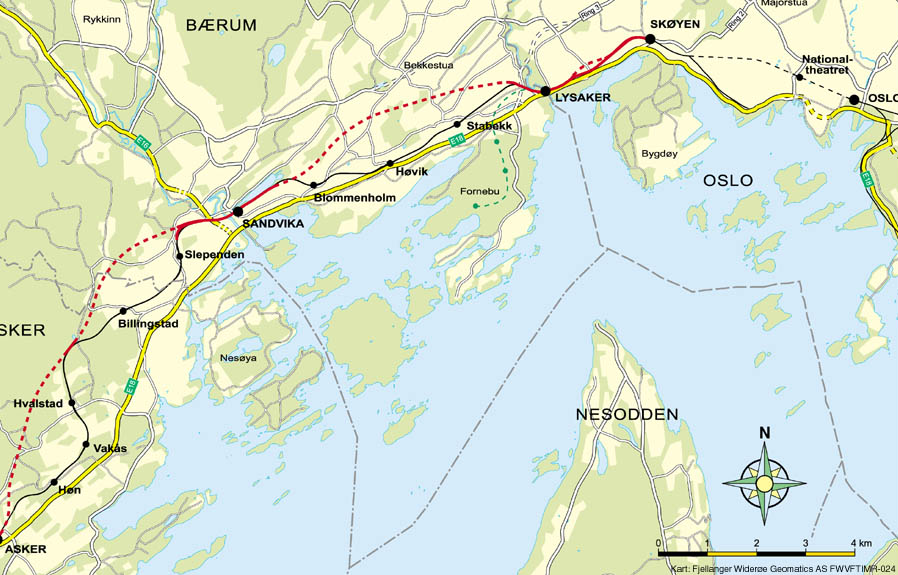
Map of railways west of Oslo, with the Asker Line in red and the Drammen Line in black. The Tanum Tunnel is the dotted red line between Sandvika and Hvalstad.

The Asker Line runs from Lysaker Station via Sandvika Station to Asker Station, in the municipalities of Bærum and Asker. The line was built to allow increased railway traffic though the main corridor west of Oslo. Previously, the only railway west of Oslo was the Drammen Line, which has limited capacity and is used by a mix of local, regional, intercity and freight trains. This caused many delays and poor utilization of tracks, as some trains make many stops and others only a few. The Asker Line allows regional and intercity trains to by-pass local stations east of Asker while local and freight trains remain on the Drammen Line. The Asker Line was built in two stages: the first, from Asker to Sandvika, was constructed between 2001 and 2005. The second stage, from Sandvika to Lysaker, was constructed between 2007 and 2011. The other two tunnels on the Asker Line are the 3,590-meter-long (11,780 ft) Skaugm Tunnel and the 5.5-kilometer-long (3.4 mi) Bærum Tunnel.

The Norwegian National Rail Administration awarded the contract to build the Tanum Tunnel to AF Spesialprosjekt, part of AF Gruppen. The tunneling cost NOK 370 million, including the open section between Solstad and Åstad, but excluding superstructure. The main part of the tunnel was built using the drilling and blasting method, using two points of entry. Work on the tunneling started in 2002 and was concluded in February 2004. Construction included the removal of 486,000 cubic meters (17,200,000 cu ft) of earthwork and the laying of 160,000 tonnes (160,000 long tons; 180,000 short tons) of ballast. Laying of tracks, signaling, power supply and other superstructures were done by Baneservice. The cost of superstructures for the entire section from Asker to Sandvika was NOK 70 million. The work was completed by November 2004. The opening of the tunnel and the rest of the section from Asker to Sandvika took place on 27 August 2005.

A concern from people living along the tunnel was that they would be subject to low-frequency noise. Originally the municipalities of Asker and Bærum had demanded that residents be subject to a maximum of 27 decibel A-weighting (dBA), but the National Rail Administration appealed the requirements and was permitted to allow up to 32 dBA. In March 2004, a test was done in the tunnel to insure that the requirements would be met, as low-frequency sound is difficult to predict. Measurements after the opening of the tunnel showed background noise of 30 dBA, that no-one was subject to 32 dBA or higher, and that it was nearly impossible to measure the passing of trains.

Among the major concerns was leaks; during the construction on the Romerike Tunnel, there was a one-year delay and severe cost overruns due to improper leak handling methods. Therefore, one of the main focuses in the Skaugum Tunnel project was to avoid similar leaks. The contract specified a maximum leakage of 4 liters (0.88 imp gal; 1.1 U.S. gal) per minute per 100 meters (330 ft). The contractor attempted to achieve this by extending the time used for pre-injection of concrete. However, there was still water dripping into the tunnel, which caused several types of damage. Some places the water dripped onto the track, causing rust; other places water dripped onto electrical equipment. There was also issues with water running down the walls and collecting in the cable conduit, and the water with limestone dripping on the ballast and mixing the ballast with limestone. By 2011, the emergency lighting system had to be replaced because of the high humidity. The National Rail Administration has stated that savings made to the specifications in the water and frost methods have caused higher maintenance costs because the small leaks which are present do a lot of harm. In addition, areas with leaks suffer from icing. This has been part of a national trend where older tunnels are nearly maintenance-free, while newer tunnels have incurred high maintenance costs.
