= Skaugum Tunnel =

Tunnel in Norway

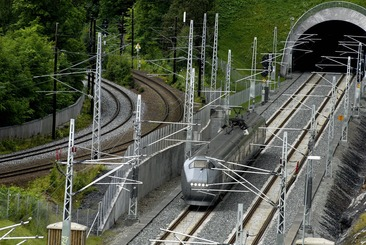
- A GMB Class 71 train leaving the tunnel
- Interactive map of Skaugum Tunnel

Overview
- Line: Asker Line
- Location: Asker, Norway
- Coordinates: 59.8521°N 10.4433°E
- System: Norwegian railway network

Operation
- Opened: 27 August 2005
- Owner: Bane NOR
- Operator: Airport Express Train; Go-Ahead Norge; Vy
- Character: Express trains

Technical
- Line length: 3,790 m (2 mi)
- No. of tracks: Double
- Track gauge: 1,435 mm (4 ft 8 1/2 in)
- Electrified: 15 kV 16.7 Hz AC
- Operating speed: 160 km/h (99 mph)

The Skaugum Tunnel (Norwegian: Skaugumtunnelen) is a 3,790-meter (2 mi) long railway tunnel in Asker, Norway, on the Asker Line. The tunnel runs between Asker Station and Solstad and was built as part of the first stage of the Asker Line, between Asker and Sandvika. Construction started in February 2002 and the tunnel opened on 27 August 2005. The tunnel was built by Mika for the Norwegian National Rail Administration using the drilling and blasting method with one crosscut. During construction there was one blasting accident. Since the tunnel opened, there have been problems with leaks damaging the infrastructure. The tunnel has double track, is electrified and allows for a maximum speed of 160 kilometers per hour (99 mph). The cost to build the tunnel, excluding the infrastructure, was 450 million Norwegian krone (NOK). The tunnel has accelerated intercity and regional traffic west of Oslo and freed up capacity for the Oslo Commuter Rail on the old Drammen Line.

== Specifications ==
The Skaugum Tunnel is a 3,790-meter (12,434 ft) long tunnel with a cross-section varying between 105 and 115 square meters (1,130 and 1,240 sq ft). It carries the double-tracked Asker Line between Asker Station and Solstad. The tunnel runs mostly through Cambrian-Silurian sedimentary slate, nodular limestone and shale, with local occurrences of Permian igneous rock. The line is electrified at 15 kV 16.7 Hz AC and allows for maximum speeds of 160 kilometers per hour (99 mph). The tunnel has frost isolation 300 meters (980 ft) into the tunnel from each end and frost fans which ensure that the air stays put in the middle of the tunnel to hinder cold air from reaching in past the frost isolation.

== History ==
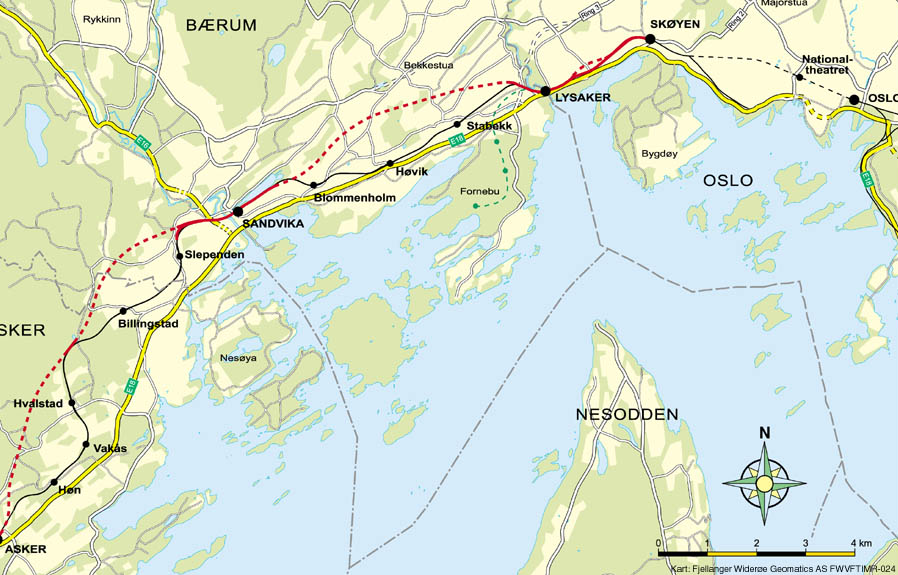
Map of railways west of Oslo, with the Asker Line in red and the Drammen Line in black. The Skaugum Tunnel is the dotted red line to the left.

The Asker Line runs from Lysaker Station via Sandvika Station to Asker Station, in the municipalities of Bærum and Asker. The line was built to increase the traffic on the west corridor. Traditionally, the only railway west of Oslo was the Drammen Line, which has limited capacity, and a mix of local, regional, intercity and freight trains. This caused many delays and poor utilization of tracks, as some trains make many stops and others only a few. The Asker Line allows regional and intercity trains to by-pass the local stations east of Asker, by running local trains and freight trains on the Drammen Line, while faster trains run on the new track. The Asker Line was built in two stages: the first from Asker to Sandvika was built from 2001 to 2005, and the second stage, from Sandvika to Lysaker, between 2007 and 2011. The other two tunnels on the Asker Line are the 3.8-kilometer (2.4 mi) long Tanum Tunnel and the 5.5-kilometer (3.4 mi) long Bærum Tunnel.

Work on geological surveys in the area started prior to 2001, with surveys being performed by the Geological Survey of Norway. The contract to build the tunnel and all other earthwork on the section from Solstad to Hønsveien was awarded to Mika, with the tunneling costing NOK 425 million. The tunnel was built using the drilling and blasting method using two points of entry, the entrance on the Asker side and from a crosscut at Skaugum. Work started in February 2002 and was concluded in May 2005. Construction involved blasting 450,000 cubic meters (16,000,000 cu ft) of earthwork and drilling 275 kilometers (171 mi) of holes for pre-injection. The construction used 14,000 cubic meters (490,000 cu ft) of gunite, 14,000 cubic meters (490,000 cu ft) of concrete, 24,000 bolts, 35,000 cubic meters (1,200,000 cu ft) of water- and frost protection, 25,000 cubic meters (880,000 cu ft) of noise- and frost isolation and 9.4 kilometers (5.8 mi) of cable conduit. Near the entrance at Asker, the tunnel is closest to the surface, and is between 2 and 3 meters (6 ft 7 in and 9 ft 10 in) below the basements of residential houses. During the construction of this part, the construction was as slow as 8 to 10 meters (26 to 33 ft) per week, of which half the time was used for injections to choke the tunnel.

During the construction there was an accident where a worker driving a wheeled loader was only 20 to 30 meters (70 to 100 ft) from a blasting. He became disabled, but did not receive any compensation because he was working for the contractor as a sole proprietor, not as a wage earner. The Norwegian Labour Inspection Authority criticized Mika for improper safety routines and required them to improve them, but concluded that no criminal offenses had been committed.

A concern from people living along the tunnel was that they would be subject to low-frequency noise. Originally the municipalities of Asker and Bærum had demanded that residents be subject to a maximum of 27 decibel A-weighting (dBA), but the National Rail Administration appealed the requirements and was permitted to allow up to 32 dBA. In March 2004, a test was done in the tunnel to insure that the requirements would be met, as low-frequency sound is difficult to predict. Measurements after the opening of the tunnel showed background noise of 30 dBA, that no-one was subject to 32 dBA or higher, and that it was nearly impossible to measure the passing of trains.

Among the major concerns were leaks; during the construction on the Romerike Tunnel, there was a one-year delay and severe cost overruns due to improper construction methods. One of the main aims in the Skaugum Tunnel project was therefore to avoid similar leaks, and the criteria were set to 4 liters (0.88 imp gal; 1.1 U.S. gal) per minute per 100 meters (330 ft). This was achieved by using sufficient time for the pre-injection, as well as continuous pregrouting through the entire tunnel. However, water still dripped into the tunnel, which caused several types of damage. In some places, it dripped onto the track causing it to rust, while in other places it fell onto electrical equipment. There were also issues with water running down the walls and collecting in the cable conduit, and the limestone in the water mixing with the ballast. By 2011, the emergency lighting system had to be replaced because of the high humidity. The National Rail Administration has stated that savings made by the specifications in the water and frost protection methods have caused high maintenance costs because the small leaks which are present have done a lot of harm. In addition, areas with leaks suffer from icing. This has been part of a trend where older tunnels are nearly maintenance-free, while newer tunnels have incurred high maintenance costs.

Laying of tracks, signaling, power supply and other infrastructure was done by Baneservice. The cost for the entire section from Asker to Sandvika was NOK 70 million. The work was done in February and March 2005. The opening of the tunnel and the rest of the section from Asker to Sandvika took place on 27 August 2005.
