= Stabekk Station =

Railway station in Bærum, Norway

Stabekk
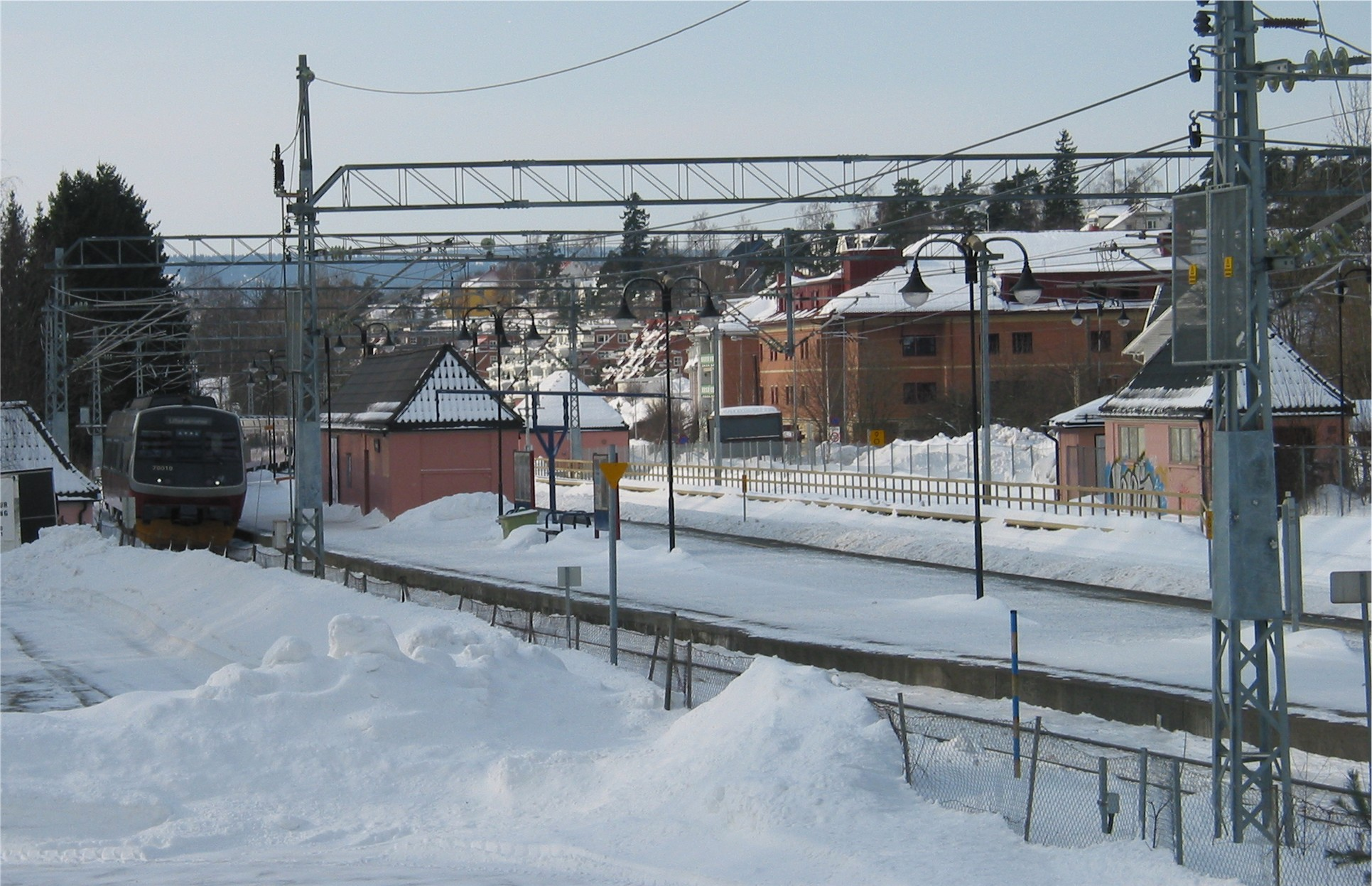
- An NSB Class 70 train passing through Stabekk Station

General information
- Location: Gamle Drammensvei 36; Stabekk, Bærum; Norway
- Coordinates: 59°54′29″N 10°36′25″E
- Elevation: 20.5 m (67 ft)
- Owner: Bane NOR
- Operator: Vy
- Line: Drammen Line
- Distance: 8.99 km (5.59 mi)
- Platforms: 1 island platform
- Tracks: 3
- Connections: Bus: Ruter

Construction
- Parking: 120 places
- Accessible: Yes
- Architect: Paul Due

Other information
- Fare zone: 1

History
- Opened: 29 May 1884
- Rebuilt: 1904; 14 December 2014
- Electrified: 30 August 1922

Passengers
- 2008: 600 (daily)
Location
- Location within Akershus

Stabekk Station (Norwegian: Stabekk stasjon) is a railway station of the Drammen Line situated at Stabekk in Bærum, Norway. Located 8.99 kilometers (5.59 mi) from Oslo Central Station, it is served by line L1, L2, L2x and L21 of the Oslo Commuter Rail and by Flytoget - the express train to Oslo Airport. It is located in a primarily residential area and has four regular hourly services operated by Vy. The station features an island platform accessible from the station building on the south side.

The station opened on 29 May 1884, twelve years after the line was completed. The station building, designed by Paul Due, was completed in 1904. It received major upgrade from 1917 to 1922, when an all-new station building and the railway was doubled, electrified and gauge converted to standard gauge. This gave a thirty-minuted headway to Oslo and Sandvika. Stabekk was staffed until 1982.

== History ==
The Drammen Line past the site of Blommenholm Station opened as a narrow gauge railway on 7 October 1872. During the planning of the line the municipal council in Bærum was consulted regarding where they wanted to have stations. They elected Sandvika and Lysaker. At the time there was a limited population at Stabekk, but not more than that a unanimous municipal council stated that it was within walking distance of Lysaker Station.

Private dwellings grew up in the Stabekk area starting in the 1860s and by the 1880s it had grown sufficiently substantial that it could support a train station. By then Høvik Station had opened between Stabekk and Sandvika. The first station at Stabekk was austere with only a simple station building and platform. It was taken into use on 29 May 1884. In 1901 there were 87,655 passengers and in 1911 there were 130,462 passengers traveling to and from Stabekk Station, excluding all commuters with a month pass.

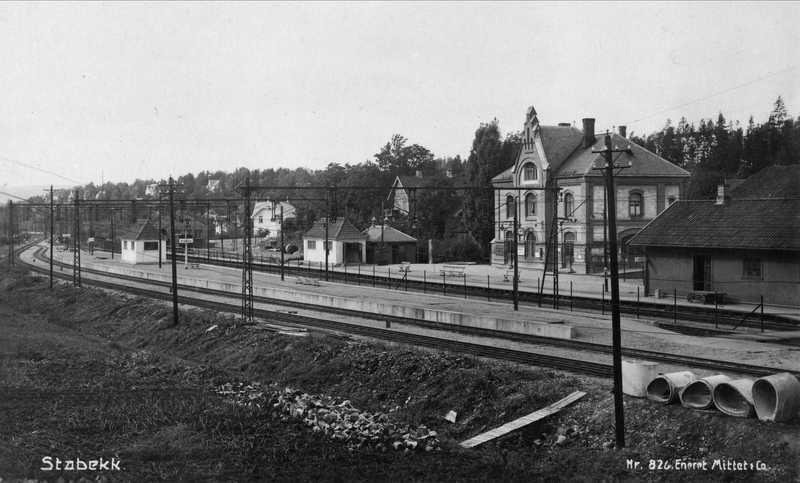
The station during the 1930s

A new station building was erected and completed in 1904, costing 41,000 Norwegian krone (NOK). About twenty people work at the station during the 1910s. The line from Sandvika to Oslo was substantially upgraded between 1917 and 1922. From 27 February 1917 a passing loop was built at Høvik and standard gauge traffic was carried out on the northern track. A southern track was then built, which was used by narrow gauge trains. However, both were dual gauge. All–standard gauge operations commenced on 9 February 1920, although the dual gauge was not removed until 1922. Electric traction started operation on 30 August 1922. An interlocking system was installed on 6 October 1924. Stabekk Station was staffed until 1 December 1982. The line past the station received centralized traffic control and automatic train stop on 3 December 1992.

The opening of the Bærum Tunnel, the second phase of the Asker Line, 26 August 2011, meant that express and regional trains bypassed Stabekk Station all together and run directly from Lysaker to Sandvika. Subsequently, the segment of the Drammen Line between Lysaker and Sandvika was upgrades. To carry out efficient construction work, the segment of track was closed and all trains diverted via the Bærum Tunnel from 7 April 2013 to 13 December 2014.

The work on Stabekk Station was awarded to Implenia and cost NOK 59.5 million. The upgrades include building a new and higher platform, demolishing the old and constructing a new underpass and construction of elevators in connection to the underpass. The upgrades freed up track capacity allowing the number of trains to increase from two to four per direction per hour.

== Facilities ==
Høvik Station is situated on the Drammen Line, 8.99 kilometers (5.59 mi) from Oslo Central Station at an elevation of 20.5 meters (67 ft). The station features three tracks. Access to the trains takes place via an island platform, which has access to two of the tracks. The third track runs closest to the station building. Access to the island platform takes place through an underpass which is equipped with stairs and an elevator. The platforms are 220 meters (720 ft) long and 76 centimeters (30 in) tall, providing universally accessibility. The platform has under-soil heating.

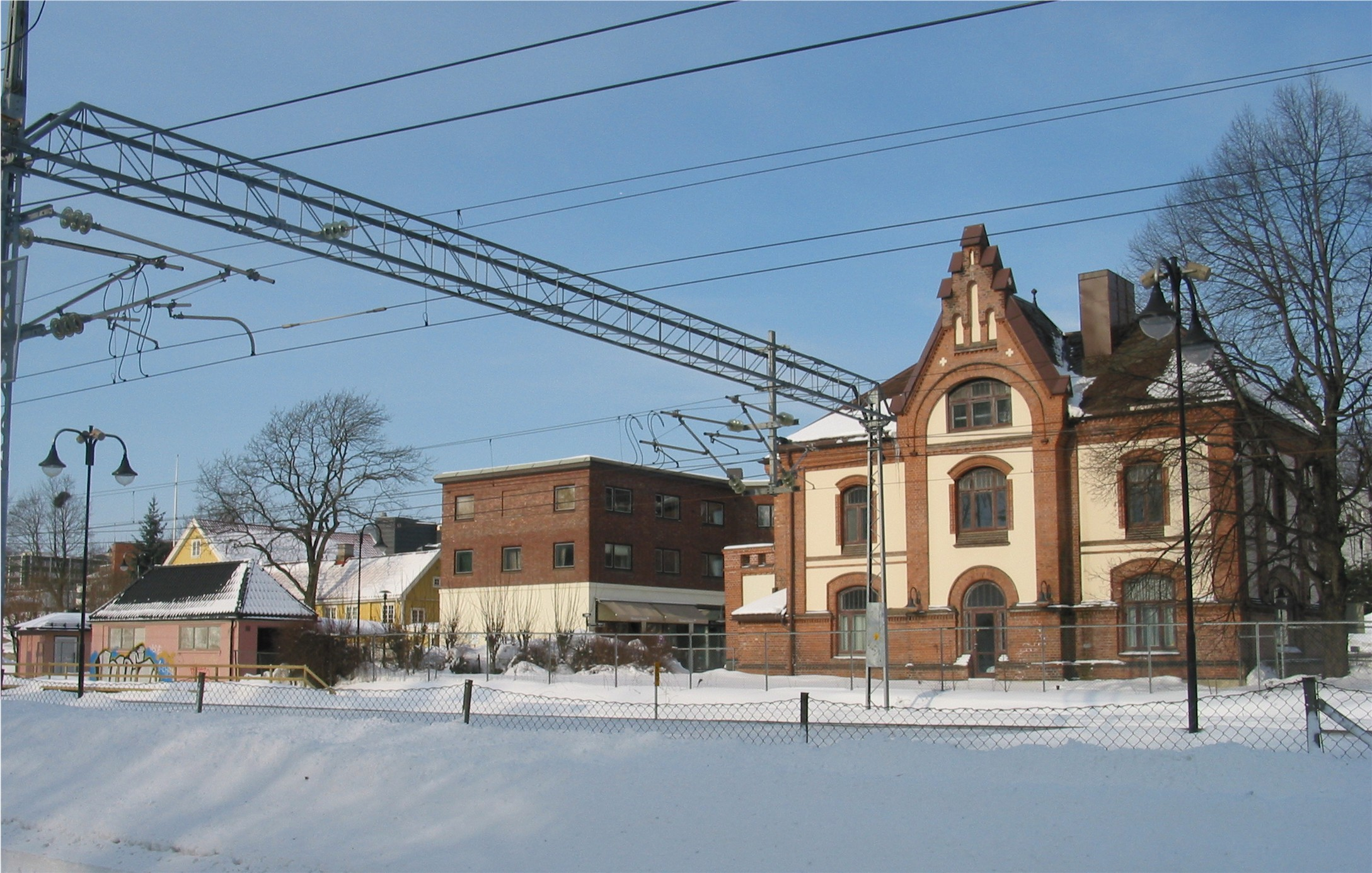
The station building

The station building, situated on the north side of the tracks, was designed by Paul Due. The brick structure features a mix of Romance and Gothic styles in the gable and windows in Art Nouveau. The station building is no longer used in conjunction with rail operations and instead used as a dormitory. It is listed as a heritage site. Next to the station building there is parking for 120 cars.

== Service ==
Vy serves Stabekk with line L1 and L2 of the Oslo Commuter Rail. L1 and L2 calls at all stations. L1 is running from Spikkestad Station along the Spikkestad Line to Asker Station and past Stabekk to Oslo Central Station. It then continues along the Trunk Line to Lillestrøm Station. L2 is starting at Ski Station running along the Østfold Line to Oslo Central Station, along the Drammen Line to Stabekk. Stabekk has four local trains per hour in direction Sandvika and Asker, and seven local trains per hour in direction to and from Oslo Central Station.

In addition there are two Flytoget trains pr. hour to Oslo Airport Gardermoen.

The station had about 600 passengers per day in 2008.

== Bibliography ==
- Bjerke, Thor; Holom, Finn (2004). Banedata 2004 (in Norwegian). Hamar / Oslo: Norsk Jernbanemuseum / Norsk Jernbaneklubb. ISBN 82-90286-28-7.
- Hartmann, Eivind; Mangset, Øistein; Reisegg, Øyvind (1997). Neste stasjon (in Norwegian). Gyldendal. ISBN 82-05-25294-7.
- Sars, Michael; Nordheim, Reidar (1974). Stabekk – En historikk (in Norwegian). Bærum: Vestre Stabekk Vel.

Preceding station	Flytoget		Following station
Terminus		FLY2	Lysaker towards Oslo Airport, Gardemoen
Preceding station	Local trains		Following station
Høvik	L1	Spikkestad–Oslo S–Lillestrøm	Lysaker
—	L2	Stabekk–Oslo S–Ski	Lysaker
