= Skøyen station =

Railway station in Oslo, Norway

Skøyen
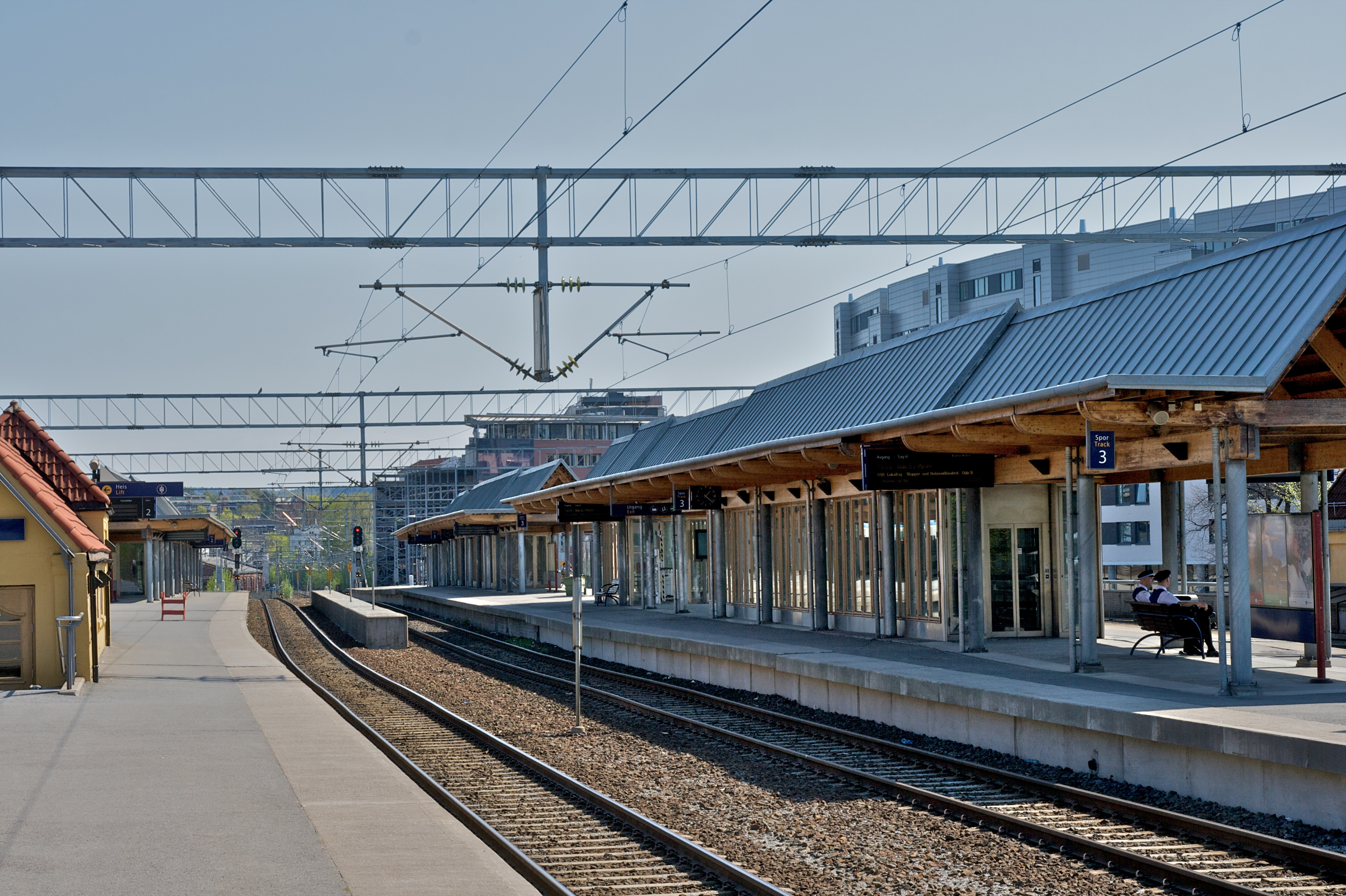

General information
- Location: Drammensveien 157; Skøyen, Oslo; Norway
- Coordinates: 59°55′20″N 10°40′44″E
- Elevation: 8 m (26 ft)
- Owner: Bane NOR
- Operator: Airport Express Train; Vy
- Lines: Drammen Line; Skøyen–Filipstad Line
- Distance: 4.36 km (2.71 mi) from Oslo S
- Platforms: 2 island platforms
- Tracks: 4
- Connections: Tram: 13 Lilleaker Line/Skøyen Line; Bus: 20 Galgeberg — (Helsfyr T); 31 Snarøya — Fornebu — Tonsenhagen — Grorud T 40 Øvre Sogn via Gaustad and Rikshospitalet; 130 Skøyen — Sandvika; 140 Skøyen — Bekkestua

Construction
- Cycle facilities: Yes
- Architect: Georg Andreas Bull (1872); Eivind Gleditsch (1916); Arne Henriksen (1998)

Other information
- Station code: SKØ
- Fare zone: 1

History
- Opened: 7 October 1872
- Rebuilt: 1916–22, 1996–98
- Electrified: 30 August 1922
Location
- Location within Oslo Location within Norway

Skøyen Station (Norwegian: Skøyen stasjon) is a railway station located at Skøyen in Oslo, Norway. It is situated on the Drammen Line, 4.36 kilometers (2.71 mi) from Oslo Central Station. It is served by regional trains and the Oslo Commuter Rail, operated by Vy, as well as by the Airport Express Train. The station is elevated and has two island platforms and four tracks.

The station opened along with the Drammen Line on 7 October 1872 with a station building designed by Georg Andreas Bull. The station was originally named Tyskestranden, taking the name Bygdø in 1876, Skøien in 1903 and the current name in 1921. The station received a major upgrade between 1915 and 1922, which included elevating the tracks, a new station designed by Eivind Gleditsch, double track and electrification. The station was further upgraded by plans designed by Arne Henriksen to the current state between 1996 and 1998.

== History ==
Skøyen Station was one of five original stations on the Drammen Line, which opened on 7 October 1872. The line was originally narrow gauge, single track and lot electrified. The station building was designed by Georg Andreas Bull in Swiss chalet style. It was located on the east of Drammensveien. The original building has since been demolished.

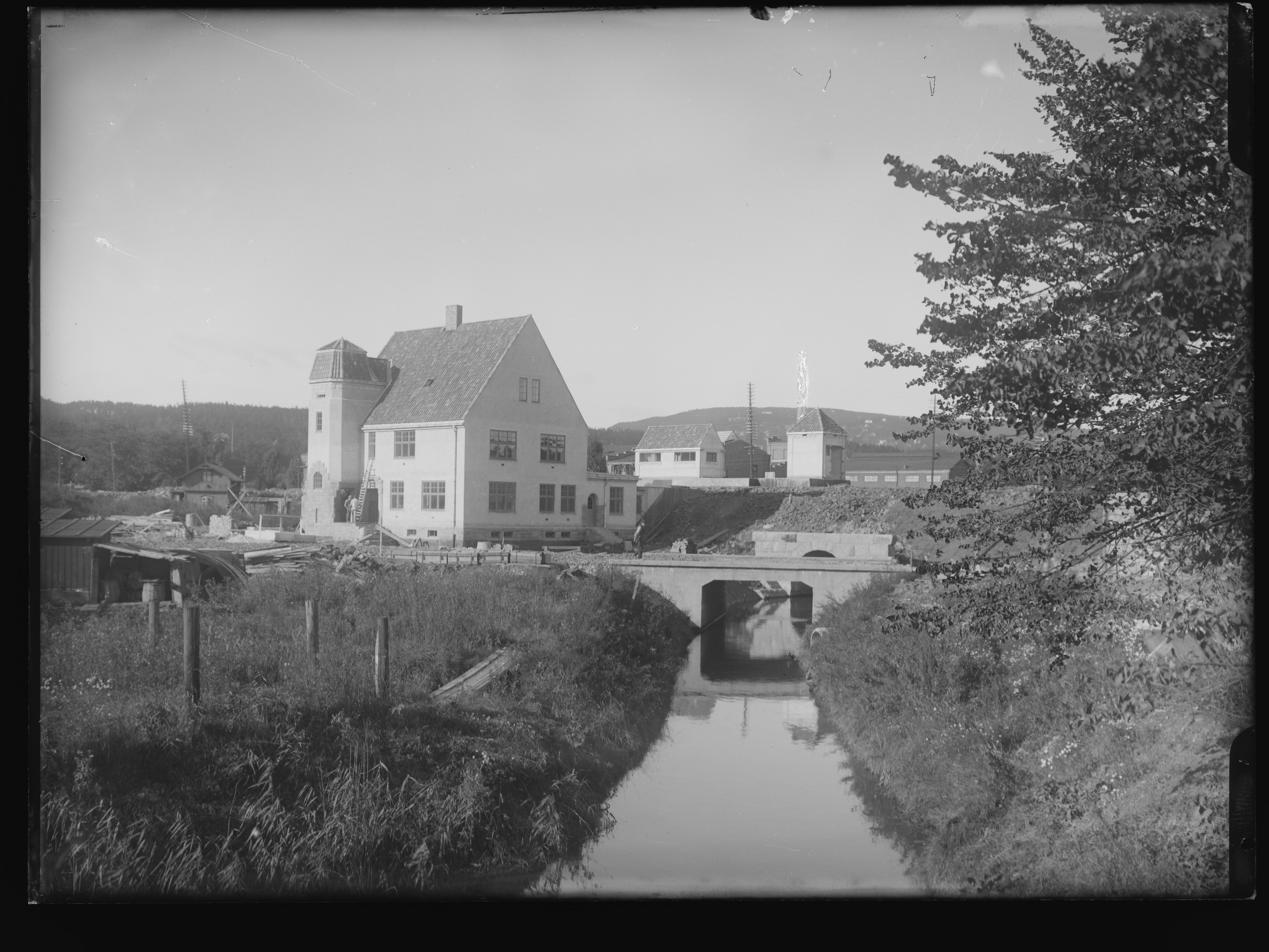
Construction of the new elevated line and station in 1916

There were few houses in the area and the railway felt that it was unnecessary to build more than one station to serve the line through Aker. The station received a significant catchment area including the neighborhood of Bestum. The arrival of the railway made it much easier to commute to the city center, and from the 1870s there was a significant increase in construction of houses along the route. The station was originally named Tyskestranden. This was derived from the contemporary name of the innermost part of the bay of Bestumkilen, along the Bestum side between Vækerø and Sjølyst. The station took the name Bygdø in December 1876. The name change came at the behest of the Bygdøy Royal Estate, which occupied the northern portion of the peninsula south of the station.

Skøyen became a center for railway-related industry. Skabo Jernbanevognfabrikk moved to Skøyen in 1873 and the same year Frognerkilens Fabrikker, later Norsk Elektrisk & Brown Boveri was established there. Thune was established in 1902. It and Skabo both received a spur. Skøyen became a mix of residential and industrial areas, with many of the housing projects being started during the 1930s. The last agricultural land in the area was used for housing during the 1980s. Norges Varemesse opened at Skøyen in 1962.

Train services were at first limited with only some trains calling at the station. Especially in the evenings this was regarded by the residents as a problem, as the last train from Oslo arrived before 20:00. This was later made better by two weekly services calling at Vækkerø at 23:30, allowing the locals to enjoy the city's nightlife. The station changed its name to Skøien on 1 May 1903, named after the farm which had been in the area. The spelling was modernized in April 1921. The Oslo Tramway's Skøyen Line was extended to Skøyen Station in 1903. The suburban Lilleaker Line extension was completed in 1919.

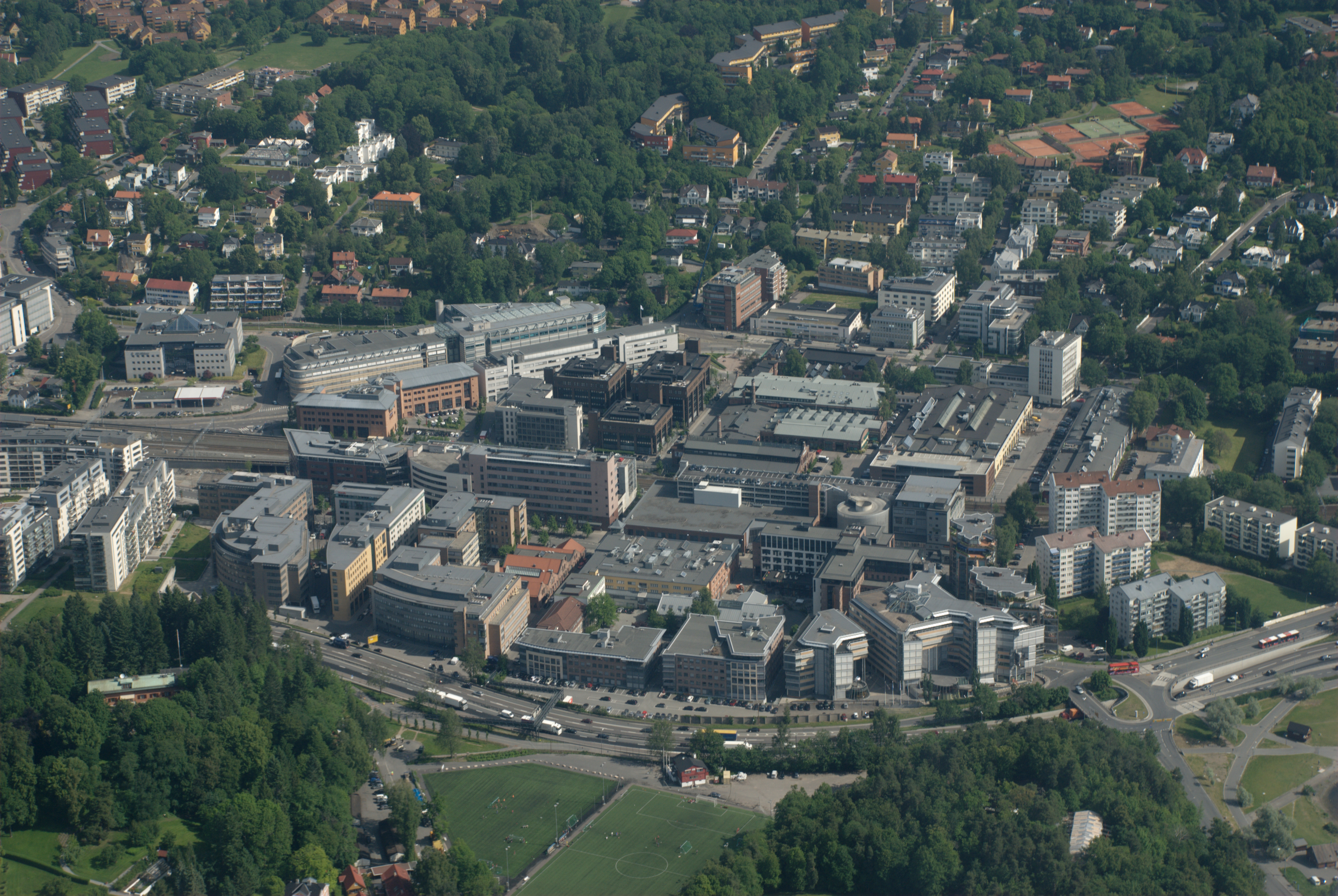
Skøyen and Sjølyst have since the 1980s developed into a major office site

Commuter traffic on the Drammen Line increased substantially and Parliament decided in 1911 to modernize the line from Oslo West Station to Sandvika Station. The entire line was elevated so that roads could pass naturally below the tracks. This made it necessary to demolish the original station building at Skøyen and replace it with one designed by Eivind Gleditsch of NSB Arkitektkontor. Completed in 1916, it was placed west of the bridge over Drammensveien. Standard gauge traffic ran on the northern track from 27 February 1917. A southern track was then built, which was used by narrow gauge trains. However, both were dual gauge. All operations switched to standard gauge from 9 February 1920, although the dual gauge was not removed until 1922. Electric traction became operations from 30 August 1922. From 1922 the station was served every thirty minutes by the Oslo Commuter Rail service between Sandvika Station and Oslo West Station. An interlocking system was installed on 14 July 1924.

A 1938 started looking at possibilities for rerouting the Drammen Line so it would connect to Oslo East Station, rather than the smaller Oslo West Station. Two main concepts were explored, both which involved a branching off from near Skøyen. The one scenario called for a tunnel under the city center, the other as a ring line which would connect Skøyen with Grefsen Station. The final plans for the tunnel route were passed by Parliament in 1968, and construction started in 1971. When the Oslo Tunnel opened 30 May 1980, the Drammen Line branched off from its old course just east of Skøyen Station. The old part remained in use and became the Skøyen–Filipstad Line. From the same date the interlocking system at Skøyen has been remotely controlled from Oslo Central Station. Centralized traffic control became operational from 3 December 1992.

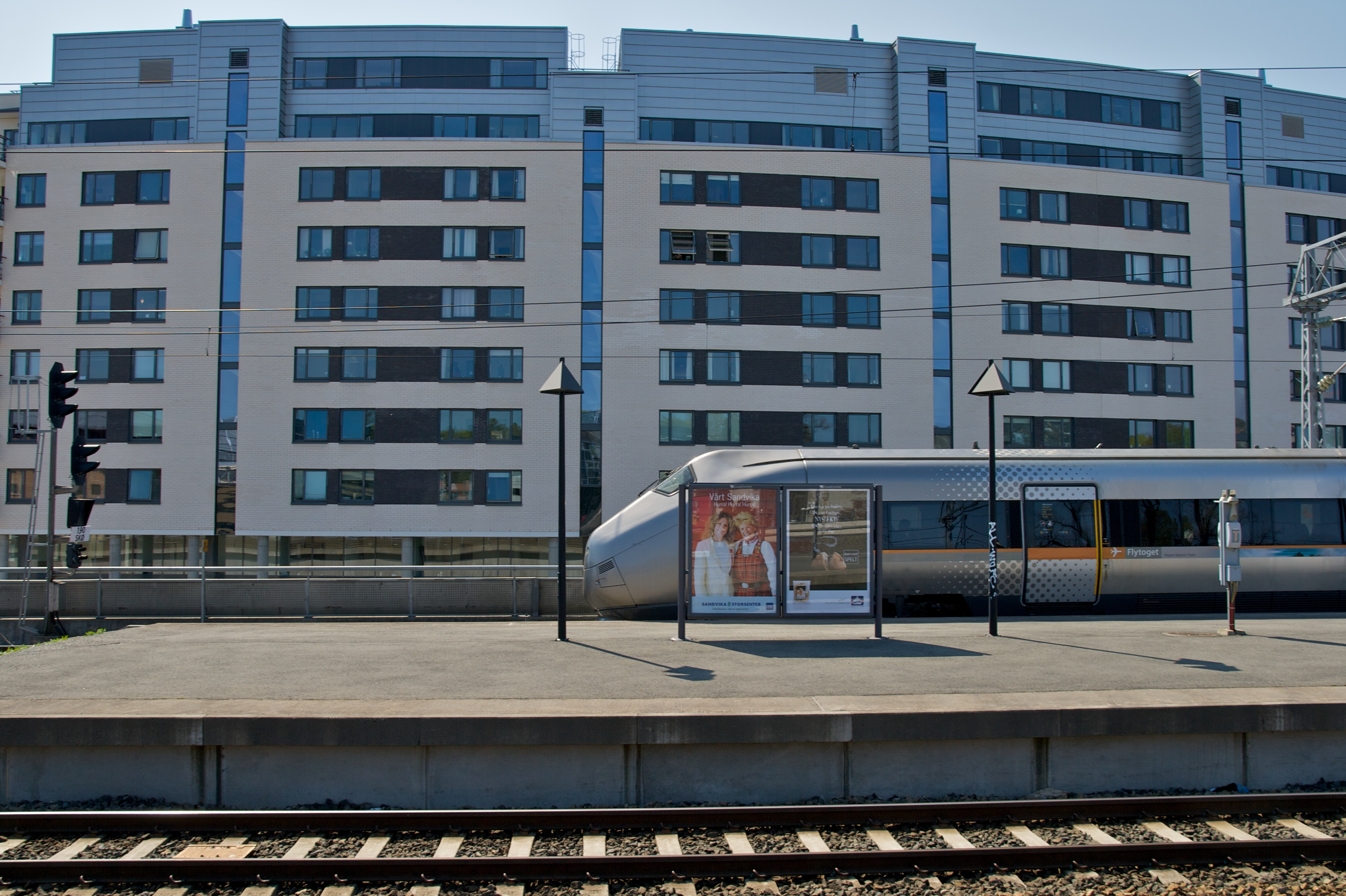
The Airport Express Train has served Skøyen since 1998

Skøyen has since the 1980s became subject to substantial de-industrialization and urban redevelopment. As the industrial companies moved out, the lots were redeveloped into office space, transforming Skøyen into one of the largest commercial zones outside the city center. The area has thus gradually become an important commuting destination.

The Norwegian State Railways launched plans for Skøyen in 1992. The station would be expanded to four tracks and a new double track would be built to Asker Station—to allow both for higher speed and increased traffic. Establishment of a new station at Skøyen was prioritized ahead of the opening of the Gardermoen Line, to allow for sufficient capacity to serve the Airport Express Train. However, there arose a dispute regarding zoning. Norges Varemesse wanted to build a new congress center at Skøyen, but the land for it came in conflict with the area needed for a new station. The land intended for the congress center was on land which had been bought from NSB 1990. Construction commenced on 1 September 1996 based on designs by Arne Henriksen. The upgraded station opened on 17 September 1998, having cost 295 million Norwegian kroner. Skøyen remained a major site for turning of trains until 2015. With the opening of four platforms at Lysaker Station and new turning tracks at Høvik Station, most trains have since been extended to at least as far as Lysaker or Stabekk Station.

== Facilities ==
Skøyen Station is situated on the Drammen Line, at a distance of 4.38 kilometers (2.72 mi) from Oslo Central Station at an elevation of 8 meters (26 ft) above mean sea level. The station is situated west of the intersection of the Drammen Line with the Skøyen–Filipstad Line. West of platforms are a network of three tracks arranged to allow trains to turn around. These have a length of between 303 and 425 meters (994 and 1,394 ft). The station features two island platforms. The southern platform is 240 meters (790 ft) long and serves trains towards Oslo. The northern platform serves trains towards Lysaker. Both platforms are 70 centimeters (28 in) tall. The platforms are universally accessible from street level, but the platforms are 6 centimeters (2.4 in) too low to allow step-free access to the trains. The station features a staffed ticket sale, waiting rooms on each platform, toilets, kiosk, and parking for cars and bicycles.

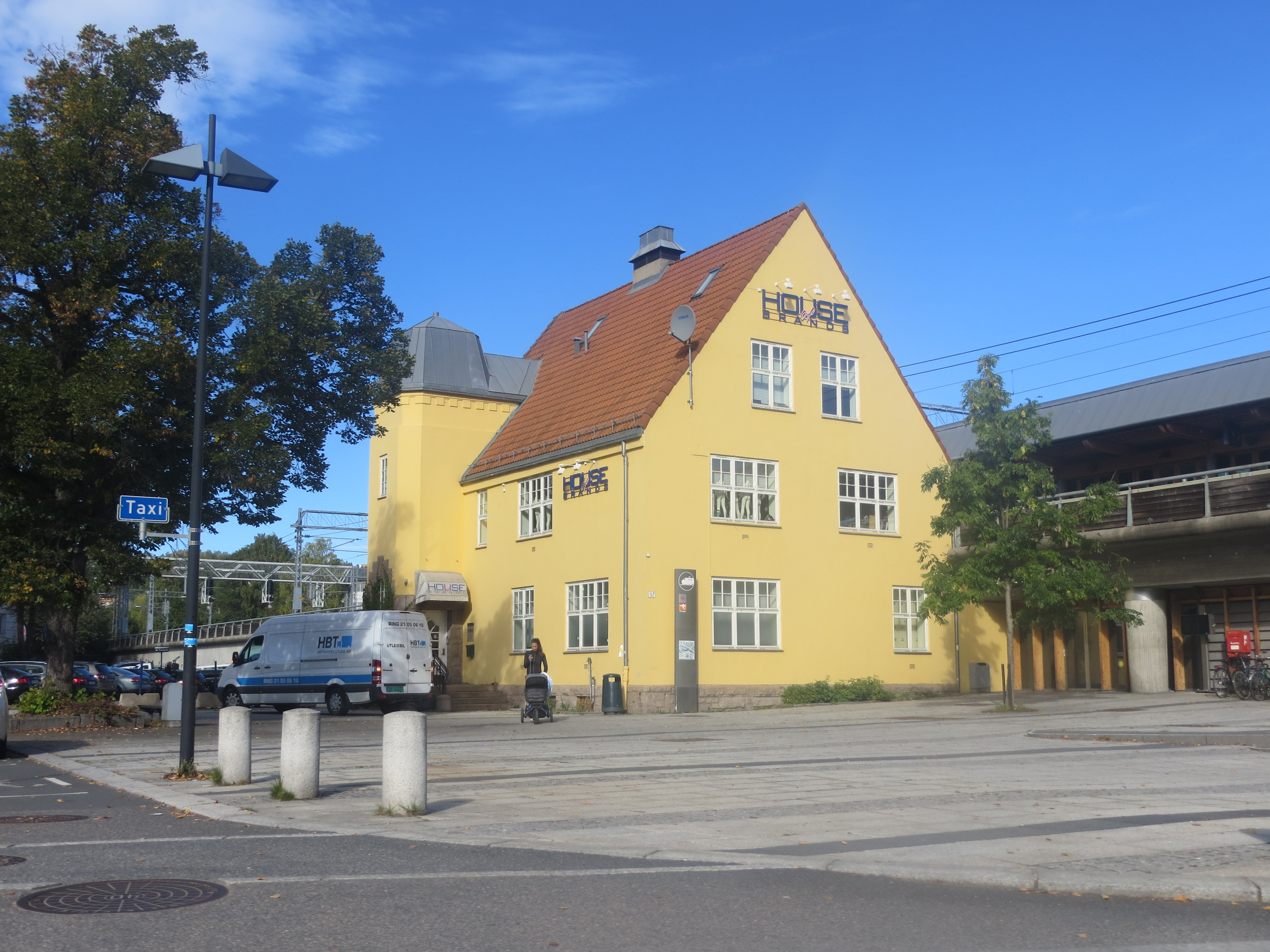
Gleditsch's station building

Eivind Gleditsch's station building was designed with a similar design to the other upgraded stations along the line to Sandvika. In its original form it had three tracks and access from below to the island platform. The brick station building itself is designed in Baroque Revival architecture with steep roofs and domed towers. Skøyen and Bestun Station are the only of these which have been preserved. The modern platforms received a design with steep roofs which match that of the station building. There are two underpasses, carrying Drammensveien and Karenlyst allé. Walls are clad in slate. The platform structures are in wood and had a design similar to that used at Oslo Airport, Gardermoen.

== Service ==
Vy serves Skøyen Station both with Oslo Commuter Rail trains as well as regional trains. Commuter trains which run through the Oslo Tunnel all run at least as far at Skøyen. Line L22 which continues to the Eastern Østfold Line terminates at Skøyen, while the rest of the lines, L1, L2, L2x, L12, L13, L14, L21, R10 and R11 continue past Lysaker. Travel time to Oslo S is seven minutes along the Asker Line. The Airport Express Train four times per hour to Oslo Airport Station. Local transport is organized by Ruter, who has Skøyen in fare zone 1. The Oslo Tramway's Skøyen and Lilleaker Lines run past Skøyen and stop their own tram station, located about 100 meters (330 ft) from the train station.

== Future ==
During the construction of the Asker Line a new double track from Skøyen to Lysaker was planned. Surveys showed that as long as there was not laid double track onward to Oslo Central Station, it would have no effect on capacity or regularity. The addition tracks were therefore abandoned. Current plans for the proposed Fornebu Line call for it to be part of the Oslo Metro. It would run from Majorstuen to Skøyen. From there it would continue via Vækerø to Lysaker Station before continuing onward towards Fornebu.

== Bibliography ==
- Bjerke, Thor; Holom, Finn (2004). Banedata 2004 (in Norwegian). Hamar / Oslo: Norsk Jernbanemuseum / Norsk Jernbaneklubb. ISBN 82-90286-28-7.
- Hartmann, Eivind; Mangset, Øistein; Reisegg, Øyvind (1997). Neste stasjon (in Norwegian). Gyldendal. ISBN 82-05-25294-7.
- Holøs, Bjørn (1990). Stasjoner i sentrum (in Norwegian). Oslo: Gyldendal Norsk Forlag. ISBN 82-05-19082-8.
- Lindemann, Hans (1986). Blommenhol vel 1911–1986 (in Norwegian). Bærum: Blommenholm Vel.
- Norwegian National Rail Administration (2009). Kapasitet Oslo S – Lysaker (PDF) (in Norwegian).
- Ruter (2011). Kollektivtrafikkbetjening av Fornebu (PDF) (in Norwegian). Archived from the original (PDF) on 7 June 2014.
- Rødevand, Øivind (1999). Turbok for Ullern (in Norwegian). Oslo: Bydel Ullern / Ullern Historielag. ISBN 82-91666-02-4.
- Udseth, K. Quale (1948). Bestum. Oslo: Bestum Vel.
- Wisting, Tor (2002). Høvik Vel 100 år (in Norwegian). Bærum: Høvik Vel.

| Preceding station | Regional trains | | Following station |
|---|---|---|---|
| Lysaker | RE10 | Drammen–Oslo S–Lillehammer | Nationatheatret |
| Lysaker | RE11 | Skien–Oslo S–Eidsvoll | Nationaltheatret |
| Preceding station | Flytoget | | Following station |
| Lysaker towards Drammen | | FLY1 | Nationaltheatret towards Oslo Airport, Gardemoen |
| Lysaker towards Stabekk | | FLY2 | Nationaltheatret towards Oslo Airport, Gardemoen |
| Preceding station | Local trains | | Following station |
| Lysaker | L1 | Spikkestad–Oslo S–Lillestrøm | Nationatheatret |
| Lysaker | L2 | Stabekk–Oslo S–Ski | Nationatheatret |
| Lysaker | L2 | Oslo S–Kolbotn | Nationatheatret |
| Lysaker | R12 | Kongsberg–Oslo S–Eidsvoll | Nationatheatret |
| Lysaker | R13 | Drammen–Oslo S–Dal | Nationatheatret |
| Lysaker | R14 | Asker–Oslo S–Kongsvinger | Nationatheatret |
| Lysaker | R21 | Oslo S–Moss | Nationatheatret |
| — | R22 | Oslo S–Mysen | Nationatheatret |
