= Bærum Tunnel =

Railway tunnel in Baerum, Norway

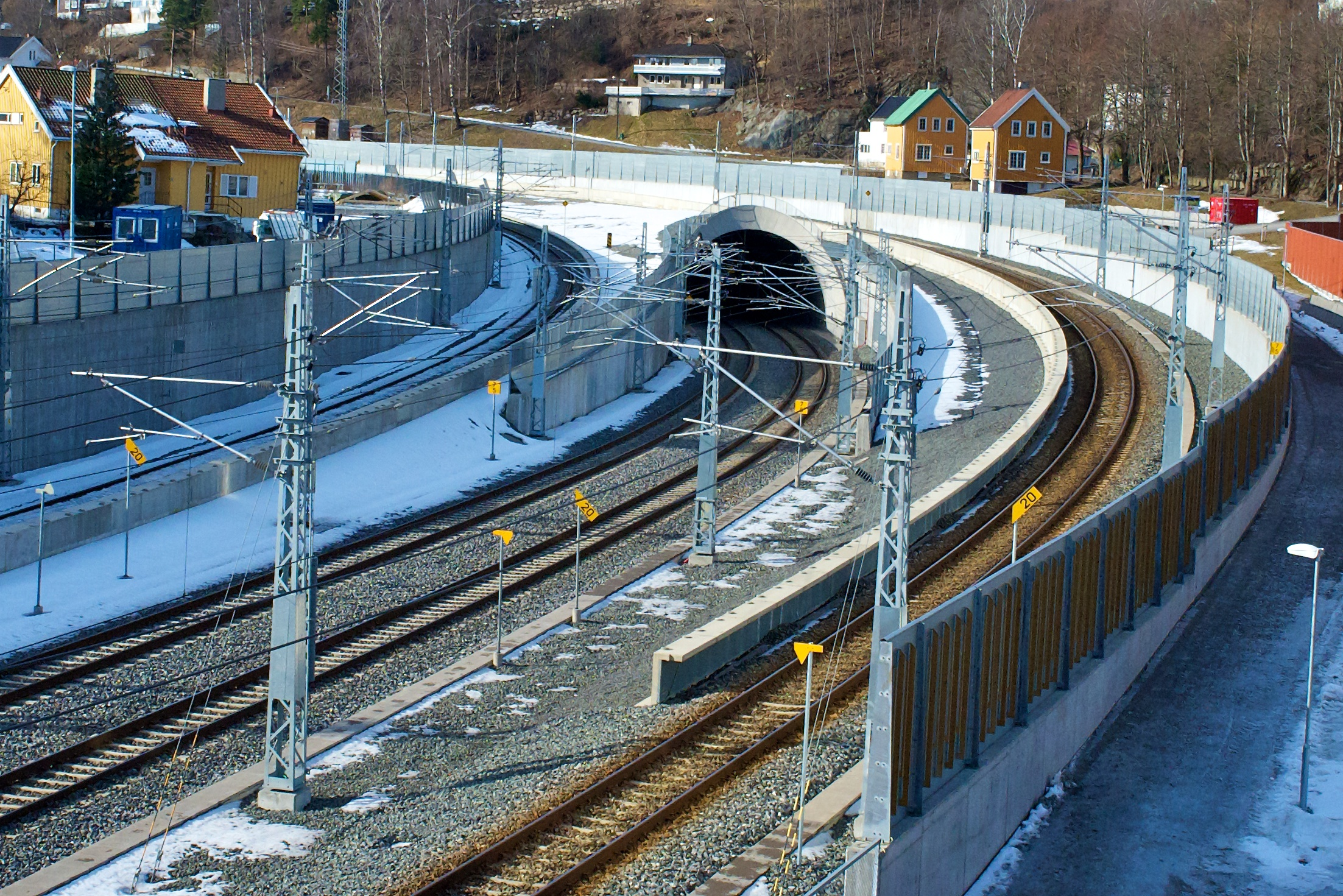
- Lysaker end of the tunnel
- Interactive map of Bærum Tunnel

Overview
- Line: Asker Line
- Location: Bærum, Norway
- Coordinates: 59.908°N 10.570°E
- System: Norwegian railway network
- Start: Marstranderveien
- End: Engervannet

Operation
- Opened: 26 August 2011
- Owner: Bane NOR

Technical
- Line length: 5.5 km (3.4 mi)
- No. of tracks: Double
- Track gauge: 1,435 mm (4 ft 8 1/2 in)
- Electrified: 15 kV 16.7 Hz AC
- Operating speed: 160 km/h (99 mph)

The Bærum Tunnel (Norwegian: Bærumstunnelen) is a 5.5-kilometer (3.4 mi) long double track railway tunnel in Bærum, Norway. Running between Marstranderveien and Engervannet, it makes up most of the 6.7-kilometer (4.2 mi) long section of the Asker Line between Lysaker Station and Sandvika Station, which was taken into use on 26 August 2011. The tunnel was constructed from 2007 using the drilling and blasting method with three crosscuts. The tunnel has two tracks, is electrified and allows for maximum speeds of 160 kilometres per hour (99 mph). The whole section between the stations is estimated to cost 2.7 billion Norwegian krone (NOK). The tunnel accelerates intercity and regional traffic west of Oslo and frees up capacity for the Oslo Commuter Rail.

== Specifications ==
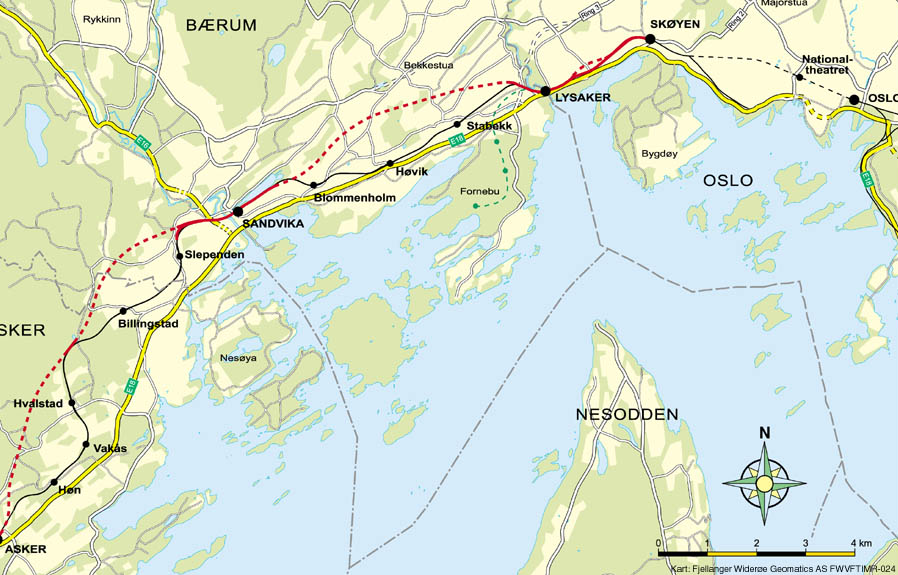
Map of railways west of Oslo, with the Asker Line in red and the Drammen Line in black. Bærum Tunnel is the dotted red line at top center

The Bærum Tunnel is 5.5 kilometers (3.4 mi) long and is part of the 6.7-kilometer (4.2 mi) long section of the Asker Line between Lysaker and Sandvika. At Engervannet, at the Sandvika end, the tunnel mouths out with two 400-meter (1,300 ft) long arms, one on each side of the Drammen Line, allowing trains to connect to the correct direction of traffic through Sandvika. The excavated cross-section is 110 square meters (1,200 sq ft). At the Lysaker end, the tunnel has an end-piece which consists of a 150-meter (490 ft) long culvert and the Drammen Line branches off on both sides of the tunnel. The three access tunnels for the tunnel's construction, at Blommenholm, Fossveien and Skallum, have been adapted for use as emergency exits. In addition, three more emergency exits have been constructed at Ballerud, Engerjordet and Njålveien, to allow for an emergency exit every 1,000 meters (3,300 ft). Each consists of a spiral staircase in a shaft up to 55 meters (180 ft) deep. These are primarily intended to allow access for emergency personnel, rather than as an escape route for passengers. Each staircase ends in a smoke-tight room. The line has two tracks, is electrified at 15 kV 16.7 Hz AC and allows for maximum speeds of 160 kilometres per hour (99 mph).

== History ==
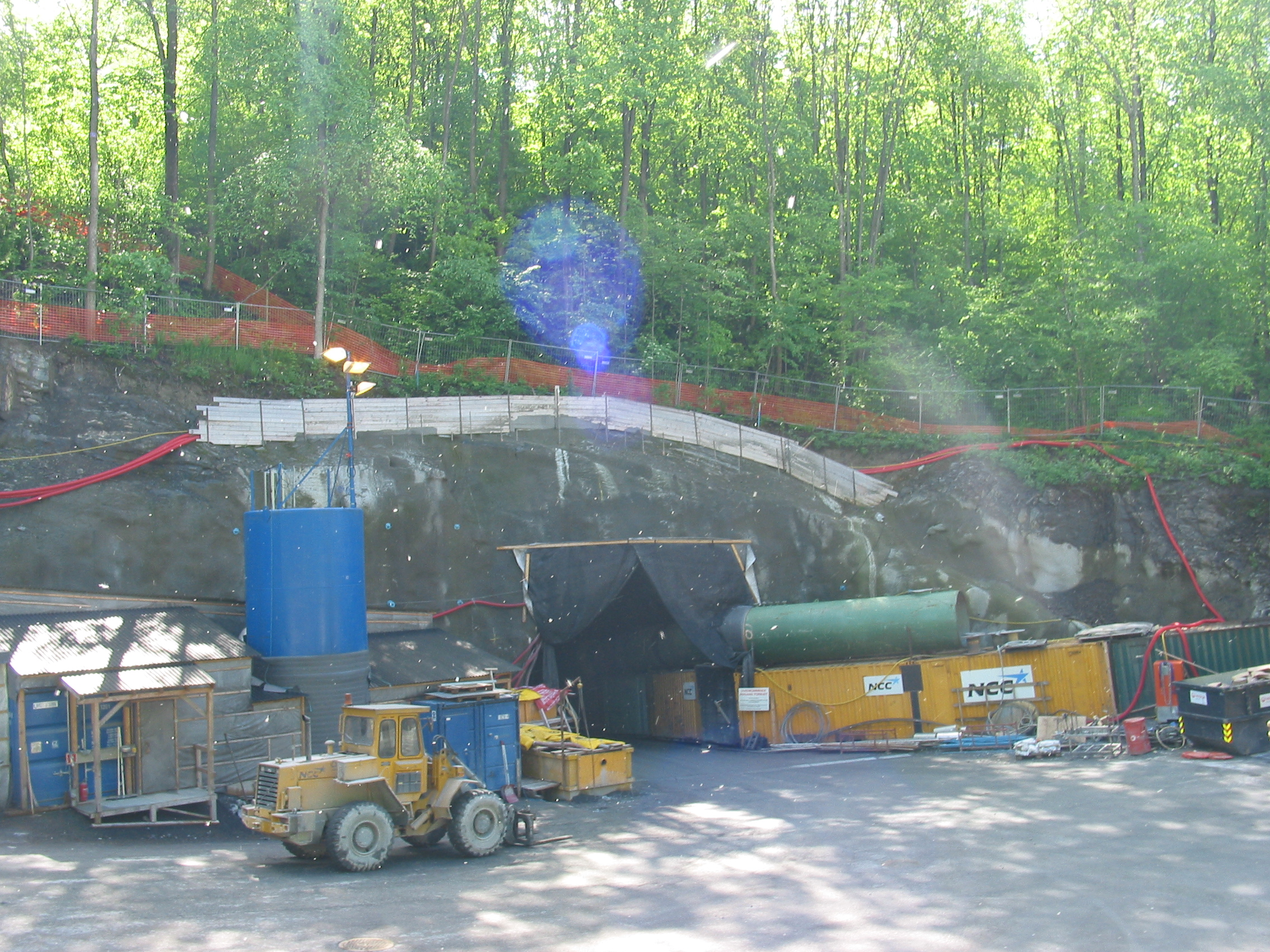
The crosscut in Fossveien

The Asker Line runs from Lysaker Station via Sandvika Station to Asker Station, in the municipalities of Bærum and Asker. The line was built to increase the traffic on the west corridor. Prior to its opening, the only railway west of Oslo was the Drammen Line, which has limited capacity, and had a mix of local, regional, intercity and freight trains. This caused many delays and poor utilization of tracks, as some trains make many stops and others only a few. The Asker Line allows regional and intercity trains to by-pass local stations east of Asker, by running slower trains on the Drammen Line and faster trains on the new track. The Asker Line was built in two stages: the first from Asker to Sandvika was built from 2001 to 2005, and the second stage, from Sandvika to Lysaker, between 2007 and 2011. The other two tunnels on the Asker Line are the 3,790-meter (12,430 ft) long Skaugum Tunnel and the 3,590-meter (11,780 ft) long Tanum Tunnel.

There were four main contracts for building the line issued after public tenders. Three of these involved part of the tunnel, and were awarded to Skanska, Veidekke and NCC. Mesta, Mika, Bestonmast and Spesialprosjekt bid, but failed to win any contracts. Work was done from 06:00 through 02:00, and noisy work was avoided before 07:00 or after 22:00. Any work outside the tunnels was only done between 07:00 to 18:00, and from 08:00 to 16:00 on Saturdays. The tunnel was built using the drilling and blasting method, which involved blasting sections of 5 meters (16 ft) of rock at a time, with a progress of 15 meters (49 ft) per week per team. Blasting started on 26 June 2007. Construction was done from three access tunnels: a 60-meter (200 ft) long bore at Engervannet, a 250-meter (820 ft) long bore at Fossveien, and a 420 meters (1,380 ft) long bore at Skallum. At Skallum, a rinsing system for the water used in the tunneling was established, allowing the water to be recycled.

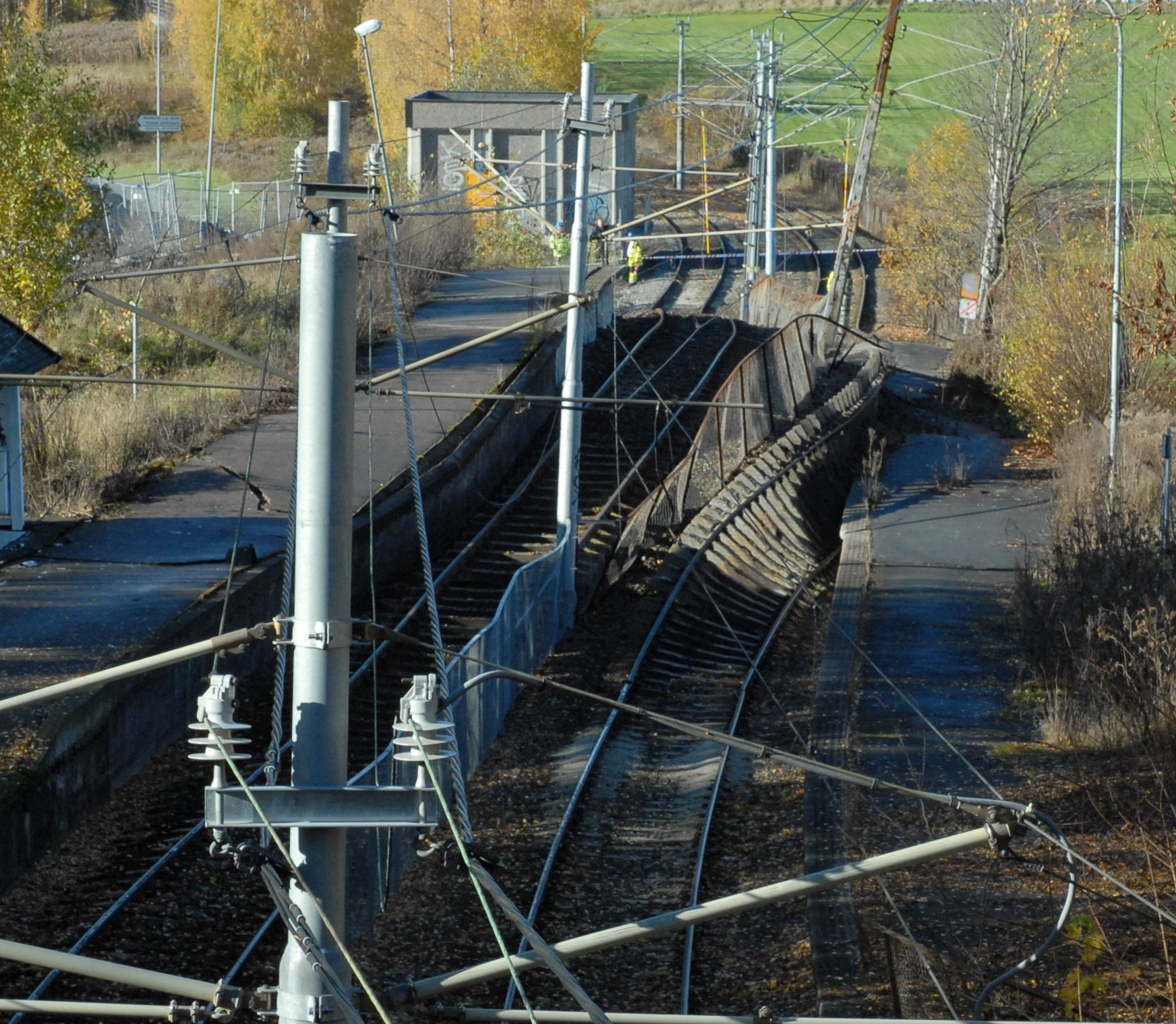
Damage to Gjønnes Station of the Oslo Metro after the land slip caused by the construction

The tunneling resulted in 800,000 cubic meters (28,000,000 cu ft) of soil, most of which was used for the expansion of the Port of Drammen. It was transported away from the tunnel with up to 12 truckloads per hour. The first breakthrough between adjacent construction sections took place on 5 June 2008. On 19 October 2008, there was a ground failure at a landfill where the soil from the tunnel was dumped. This caused a land slip which pressed up soil nearby at Gjønnes Station on the Kolsås Line of the Oslo Metro (that section of the Kolsås Line was largely unused due to unrelated construction at the time); a 50 meters (160 ft) long section of one platform and track was pressed up 3 meters (9.8 ft), resulting in the other track lying on its side. Because of changes to European Union regulations after planning of the project, three extra emergency staircases had to be installed in late 2009. The final breakthrough in the tunnel occurred on 26 July 2009. The tunneling took place under the groundwater level. To avoid similar problems which occurred during the construction of the Romerike Tunnel, where massive leaks took a year to fix, several test bores were made in the area to measure the groundwater level. The measuring system was set up to communicate any indications of a change immediately & automatically to the on-site geologists, who would be able to act accordingly. The system also automatically pumped water into the affected areas to compensate for any leaks until they could be fixed.

To make the tunnel watertight and frost-resistant, the walls were covered with polyethylene mats. Because they are highly flammable, they were then covered in a layer of gunite. Also installed were fire water pipes and ventilation systems to remove smoke. To sound-insulate the tunnel and to avoid vibrations spreading to nearby housing, the entire tunnel was covered in a layer of rock wool. By December 2010, the ballast had been laid, and in January 2011 laying of the tracks and ties started. The work to build the tracks and overhead wires was contracted to Baneservice. The contract for the electro-technical installations was awarded to YIT Building Systems for NOK 120 million. In 2006, the whole section from Lysaker to Sandvika was estimated to cost NOK 2.7 billion.

Freight trains started using the tunnel on 26 August 2011, and passenger trains on 28 August the same year. The official opening took place on 2 September 2011. Along with several other projects west of Oslo, including a new Lysaker Station and Høvik Station, and an upgrade to the Drammen Line between Lysaker and Etterstad, the Asker Line was meant to allow for higher service frequency, higher regularity and faster trains west of Oslo after its completion. The higher capacity was exploited with a new high-frequency schedule, named Route Plan 2012, following delivery of new Stadler FLIRT trains. This also allowed for more trains that stop at all stations on the Drammen Line, for three hourly trains to Vestfold and for six hourly trains stopping at the main stations west of Oslo. The new schedule was implemented partially from the December 2012 timetable change, and completely from December 2014, following the completion of resignalling.
