= Asker Line =

Railway line in Norway

Coordinates: 59°51′59.54″N 10°28′48.97″E

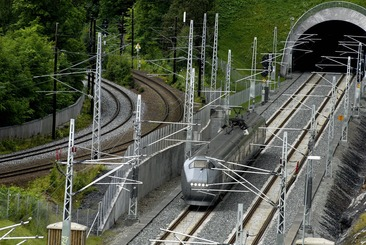
- An GMB Class 71 leaving the Skaugum Tunnel at Åstad, with the Drammen Line to the left

Overview
- Native name: Askerbanen
- Owner: Bane NOR
- Termini: Lysaker Station; Asker Station
- Stations: 2

Service
- Type: Railway
- Operator(s): Airport Express Train; Go-Ahead Norge; Vy; Vy Tog; CargoNet
- Rolling stock: Class 70, Class 71, Class 72, Class 73

History
- Opened: 27 August 2005

Technical
- Line length: 9.5 kilometres (5.9 mi)
- Number of tracks: Double
- Character: Express passenger Freight
- Track gauge: 1,435 mm (4 ft 8 1/2 in)
- Electrification: 15 kV 16.7 Hz AC
- Operating speed: 160 km/h (99 mph)

The Asker Line (Norwegian: Askerbanen) is a 9.5-kilometre (5.9 mi) railway line between Asker and Lysaker in Norway. The line runs along the same corridor as the Drammen Line, offering increased capacity, speed and regularity on the rail network west of Oslo. The first part opened in 2005, and in 2011 an extension opened from Sandvika to Lysaker. Original plans called for an extension to Skøyen, but from 2020, new planning is under way for an extension all the way to Oslo Central Station. Most of the railway is in tunnel and is dimensioned for 160 km/h (99 mph) running. The entire railway is electrified at 15 kV 16.7 Hz AC. The first section cost 3.7 billion kr, while the second is budgeted at NOK 2.7 billion.

The purpose of the new line is to allow regional and express trains to run directly between Asker Station, Sandvika Station and Lysaker Station, without being slowed and delayed by commuter trains that make frequent stops at intermediate stations. The Asker Line will improve regularity, and capacity will increase from 12 to 26 trains per hour in each direction. Travel time from Asker to Skøyen Station will be reduced from 20 to 13 minutes. The line has received criticism for not being a true high-speed line, and for Lysaker Station not being in compliance with accessibility requirements. Similar parallel, high-speed lines have been built northeast and southeast of Oslo.

The line is built, owned and maintained by Bane NOR (previously the Norwegian National Rail Administration). At Sandvika, the line connects to the Drammen Line, which runs to Oslo Central Station in the east. At Asker, the line connects to the Spikkestad and Drammen Lines; the latter connects to the Sørland- and Vestfold Line at Drammen. The line is served by Vy with regional trains to Vestfold, Buskerud and Telemark, and the express trains along the Sørland Line and the Bergen Line; in addition, the Airport Express Train operates from Asker to Oslo Airport, Gardermoen. During night, freight trains also use the line.

== Background ==
Following the construction of the high-speed Gardermoen Line from Oslo, via Oslo Airport, Gardermoen, to Eidsvoll, the Norwegian Ministry of Transport and Communications started planning additional high-speed lines west and southeast of Oslo. The Asker and Follo Lines would allow express and regional trains to travel faster and more reliably to Drammen and Ski, leaving the old tracks for slower freight trains, and commuter trains making frequent stops. Construction of the Follo Line will, at the earliest, be completed in 2015.

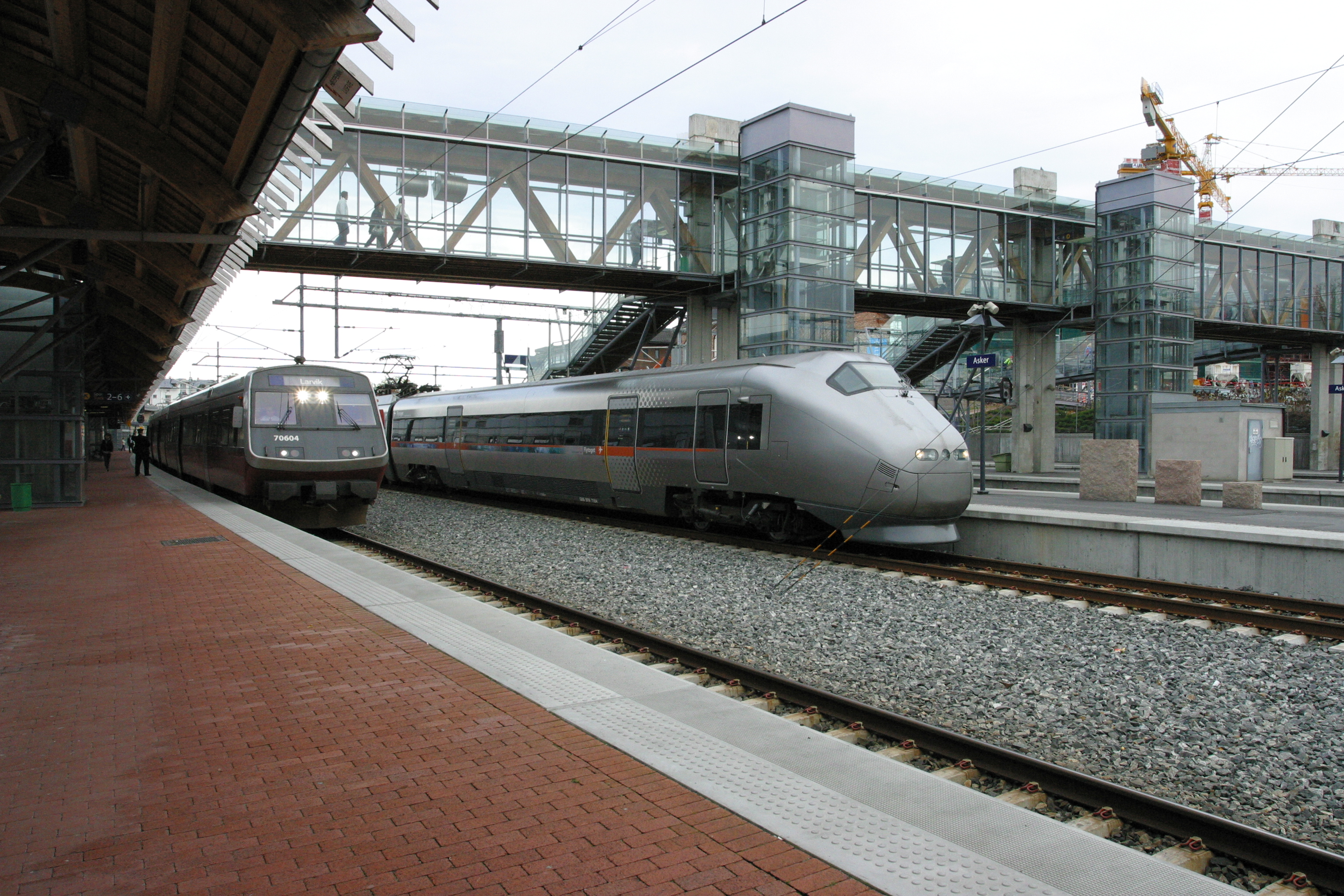
NSB Class 70 unit to Vestfold and the Airport Express Train at Asker.

The Gardermoen Line had shown that profits could be made by operating passenger trains, but that it would not be possible to debt-finance short-distance tracks in Eastern Norway. Therefore, a conventional financial method for the Asker Line was started. While the railway is entirely financed through allocation through the state budget, the prioritising was secured through a political compromise for investments in Greater Oslo, the Oslo Package 2. Financing of a diverse range of road and public transport investments—including new motorways, extension of the Oslo Metro and new railways—would be made through a "package". This involved both state, county and toll funding being collected in one lot, and then redistributing the funds to the agencies responsible for the investments.

Prior to the construction, the Western Corridor had a capacity of 12–14 trains per hour in each direction west of Skøyen. The first section of the Asker Line, from Asker to Sandvika, increased the capacity with an additional two trains. The opening of Lysaker Station will increase capacity with four more, since all stations along the line between Oslo and Drammen will then have four platforms. When the whole line is completed, total capacity in the Western Corridor will be 26 trains per hour. This is equivalent to 5,500 cars per hour, and exceeds the capacity of a four-lane motorway.

The Asker Line is also a necessary component to allow a high-speed route to be built along the Vestfold and Ringerike Lines. The former is planned to branch off at Drammen, while the latter would branch of at Sandvika, and become a 60-kilometre (37 mi) shortening of the Bergen Line. The first sections of the upgraded Vestfold Line opened in 1995 and 2001, and additional proposals are under planning for the remaining sections.

== Route ==
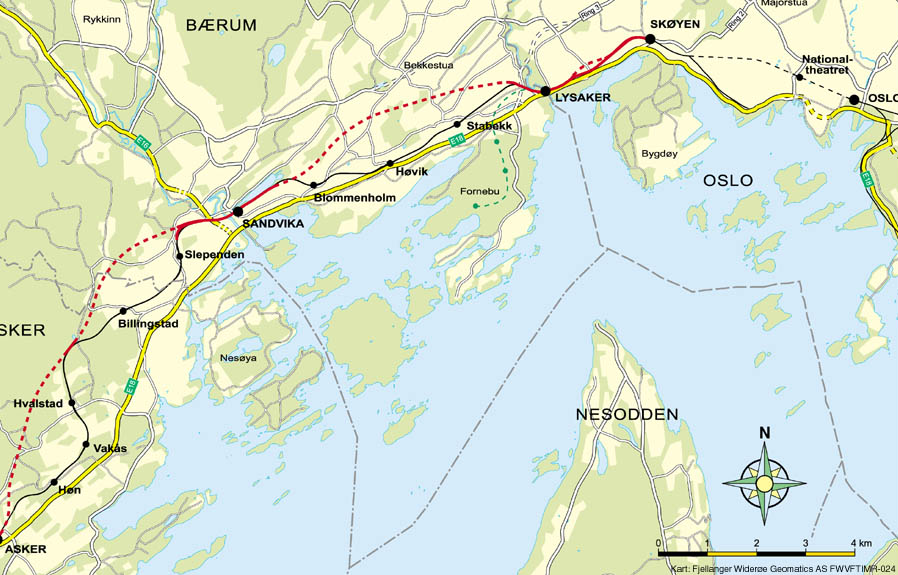
Red line shows the Asker Line, black the Drammen Line, with tunnels dotted

=== Asker Station ===
Asker Station is the end of the Asker Line, and trains must continue westwards along the Spikkestad Line or the Drammen Line. The latter immediately enters the Lieråsen Tunnel, allowing the same speeds as the Asker Line to Drammen. The Spikkestad Line is only used by the commuter trains to Spikkestad. Along with building the line, Asker Station was upgraded from five to six platforms, and also received a new, artistically decorated underpass between the platforms. The station is located 23.16 kilometres (14.39 mi) from Oslo Central Station (Oslo S) at 104.6 metres (343 ft) elevation.

=== Asker–Sandvika ===
Construction of the section between Asker and Sandvika started in 2001, and was completed in 2005. It was officially opened by Torild Skogsholm, Minister of Transport from the Liberal Party, on 27 August. This section is dominated by the 3,590-metre (2.23 mi) Tanum Tunnel and the 3,790-metre (2.35 mi) Skaugum Tunnel, and cost NOK 3.7 billion. For the last 1.5 kilometres (0.93 mi) of track west of Sandvika, the Asker and Drammen Line have been built along the same, new, right-of-way. The Drammen Line, leaves Slependen Station, and joins the Asker Line just after the latter leaves the Tanum Tunnel.

=== Sandvika Station ===
Sandvika Station is 14.14 km (8.79 mi) from Oslo S, at 12.0 metres (39.4 ft) elevation. The track layout has been criticised by among others Norsk Bane, for not permitting high through speeds. A sharp curve before the station will not permit trains to travel at more than 80 km/h (50 mph), even if they are not scheduled to stop at the station. This will increase travel time, and hinder the efficiency of the line should it be used later for high-speed lines to Vestfold or Western Norway. The proposed Ringerike Line would demerge just west of Sandvika Station.

=== Sandvika–Lysaker ===
Construction of the second section started in 2007 and was completed in 2011. The section between Sandvika and Lysaker is 6.7 kilometres (4.2 mi), most of which runs through the 5.5-kilometre (3.4 mi) Bærum Tunnel. There was local debate whether the tunnel should be built using a tunnel boring machine or by drilling and blasting. The latter was preferred by the Rail Administration, since it allowed a shorter construction time, and a NOK 700 million saving. Total budget is NOK 2,787 million.

=== Lysaker Station ===
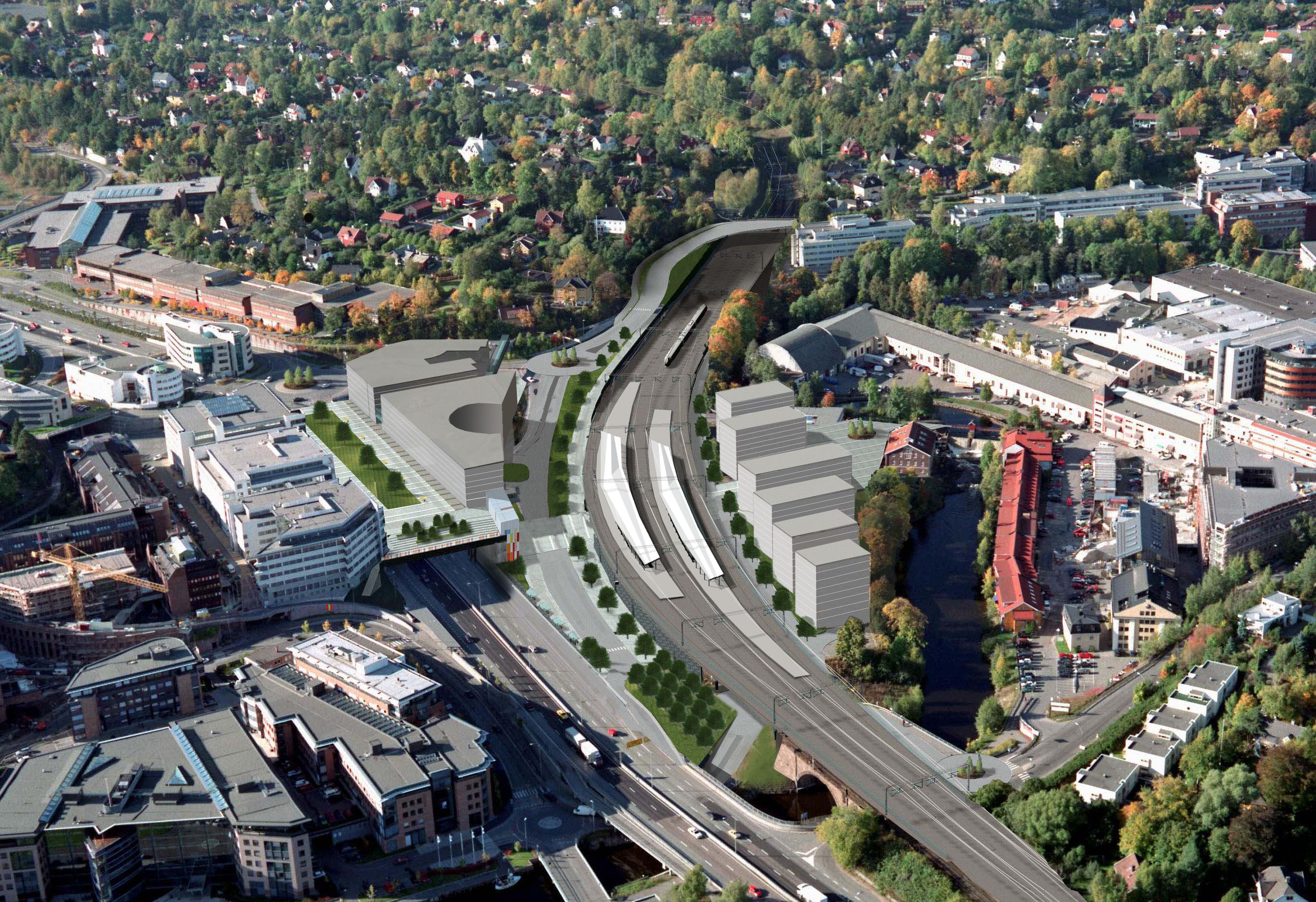
An artist's impression of Lysaker Station after it is rebuilt in 2009

Lysaker Station serves as the main public transport hub for Eastern Bærum, parts of Western Oslo and Fornebu. Within 800 metres (2,600 ft), there are 20,000 jobs, with an additional 10–15,000 in development. Located 7.00 kilometres (4 mi) west of Oslo S, it is receiving a major overhaul between 2006 and 2009, including 1.2 km (0.75 mi) of new track. The current station will be entirely replaced, and the number of platforms increased from two to four. More than one thousand buses depart from Lysaker Station each day, and it has been proposed as the terminus of the Fornebu Line—a tramway originally proposed as a people mover.

The NOK 1 billion renovation has become a scandal, due to the station being built in a curve, and thus does not have straight platforms. This will become a security problem; in addition it will create a gap up to 40 centimetres (16 in) between the train and the platform, hindering accessibility to the trains for disabled people. Norges Statsbaner claims they will have to buy new trains due to this station alone, costing the state-owned company NOK 1.5 billion. Minister of Transport, Liv Signe Navarsete from the Centre Party, has said that resolving the problems by building a straight station is not an alternative, since it would cost an additional hundred-millions of NOK, and delay the new station several years.

=== Lysaker–Skøyen (–Oslo Central) ===
The last section in the original plan is a proposed 2.1-kilometre (1.3 mi) section from Lysaker to Skøyen; the latter not being modified as part of the extension, since it was upgraded in 1999. The government originally deferred the decision on the start of construction until at least 2020, since the government prioritised other projects over this section. No specific route was finalised at that point, and proposed alternatives would either run parallel to the current Drammen Line, or by placing all four tracks through a new tunnel. The former has been preferred by the Rail Administration, while the latter—which would cost NOK 1 billion more—has been preferred by the municipality. There are no intermediate commuter stations between Skøyen and Lysaker, so there is little regularity or speed potential to gain from the construction, since the Oslo Tunnel from Skøyen to Oslo Central Station will still remain a bottleneck with only two tracks. Advocates have claimed that there is no gain from building this section without building two additional tracks all the way to the central station. Following the preparation of a new study on routes between Oslo Central Station and Lysaker, the Norwegian National Rail Administration endorsed a route alternative entirely in tunnel, bypassing Skøyen to the north.

== Operation ==
Vy Tog and Go-Ahead Norge operates their express trains on the Bergen Line and Sørlandet Line on the Asker Line, along with the regional trains along the Vestfold Line operated by Vy. They also operate some of Oslo Commuter Rail trains, that do not stop on the intermediate stations. Other commuter trains use the old Drammen Line, along with freight trains. However, in 2006, the night freight trains were moved to the new line, despite operating at less than 100 km/h (62 mph). The Flytoget airport express train operates along the line three times per hour using Class 71 multiple units, connecting the main stations west of Oslo to Oslo Airport, Gardermoen.

With the opening of the new line, NSB stopped operating their commuter trains from Drammen to Oslo with stops at Høn, Hvalstad and Billingstad. Passengers from Drammen now need to transfer in Asker, but all other passengers have travel times reduced from 48 to 36 minutes.

== See also ==
- Follo Line
