= Norsk Bane =

Norwegian railway company

Norsk Bane AS
- Company type: Private
- Industry: Railway
- Headquarters: Ålesund, Norway
- Key people: Jörg Westerman (CEO); Kjell Stundal (Chairman)
- Services: Consulting
- Website: www.norskbane.no

Norsk Bane is a Norwegian limited company that is working on plans to build a high-speed railway throughout large portions of Norway. The company has developed detailed plans for numerous lines and claims they would be able to build and operate a high-speed network in Norway, if granted permission. Norsk Bane operates as a commercial investment company, an interest organization and a consulting company. The company is owned by municipalities, counties and other local forces in western Norway, and is mainly a lobbyist organization.

== Proposal ==
The company has proposed several new high-speed lines. Some would be built single track while other double track and all electrified. Haukelibanen has been proposed to go from Oslo via Haukeli north to Bergen and southwards to Haugesund and Stavanger. Also proposed is a new high-speed line from Oslo via Dovre west to Ålesund and north to Trondheim and Steinkjer. Other plans involve new tracks in Eastern Norway to Vestfold, Grenland, along both sides of Mjøsa and in Østfold.
