= Lysaker Station =

Railway station in Bærum, Norway

Lysaker
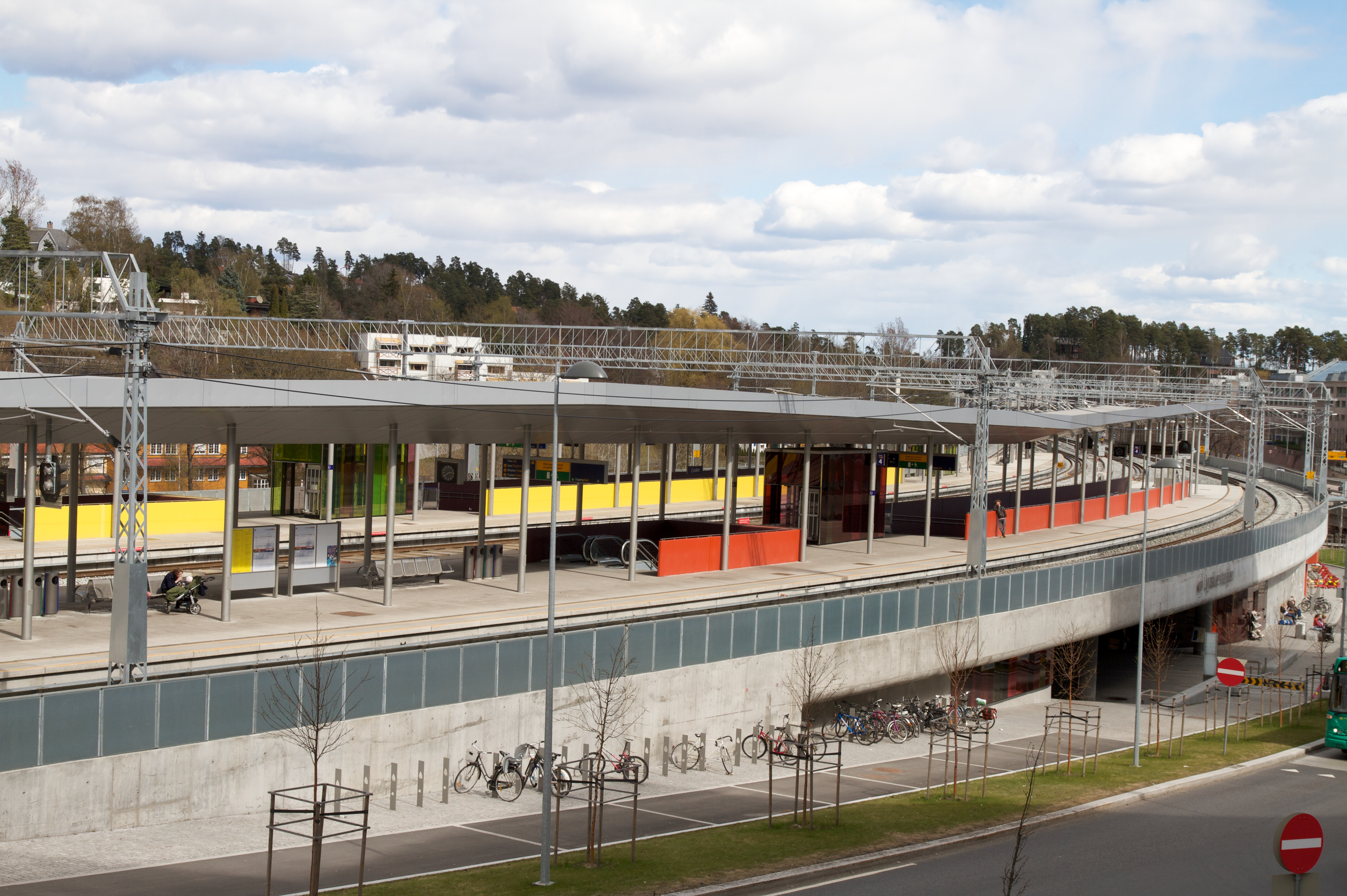

General information
- Location: Drammensveien 325; Lysaker, Bærum; Norway
- Coordinates: 59°54′49″N 10°38′9″E
- Elevation: 7.5 m (25 ft)
- Owner: Bane NOR
- Operator: Flytoget; Go-Ahead Norge; Vy
- Lines: Drammen Line; Asker Line
- Distance: 7.00 km (4.35 mi)
- Platforms: 2 island platforms
- Tracks: 4
- Connections: Bus: Ruter routes 23, 31, 31E, 40, 42, 81, 130, 140, 140E, 150, 150E, 160, 160E, 250, 250E, 255E, 265E. Ferry: B11 Nesoddtangen

Construction
- Structure type: Elevated
- Accessible: Yes
- Architect: Georg Andreas Bull (1872); Adalbert Kielland (1916); Arne Henriksen (1987); Snøhetta (2009)

Other information
- Station code: LYS
- Fare zone: 1

History
- Opened: 7 October 1872
- Rebuilt: 1914, 1987, 2006–09
- Electrified: 30 August 1922

Passengers
- 2008: 5,200 (daily)
Location
- Location within Akershus

Lysaker Station (Norwegian: Lysaker stasjon) is a railway station on the Drammen Line and Asker Line situated at Lysaker in Bærum, Norway. Located 7.00 kilometers (4.35 mi) from Oslo Central Station, Lysaker is served by a mix of Vy express, regional and Oslo Commuter Rail trains, as well as Flytoget. The station is elevated and features two island platforms with four tracks. It's the terminus of the Asker Line.

Lysaker was one of two original Drammen Line station in Bærum, opening on 7 October 1872. The original station building, designed by Georg Andreas Bull, burned down in 1914 and was replaced by a new station Adalbert Kielland. In the following years the elevated and double-track layout was introduced. This station arrangement was demolished in 1987 to make way for a station designed by Arne Henriksen. Traditionally only served by commuter trains, the station was branded as Lysaker/Fornebu from 1990 to 2000 because of its vicinity to Oslo Airport, Fornebu. The station was rebuilt again from 2006 to 2009 in which it was expanded from two to four tracks. It became connected to the Asker Line in 2011.

== History ==
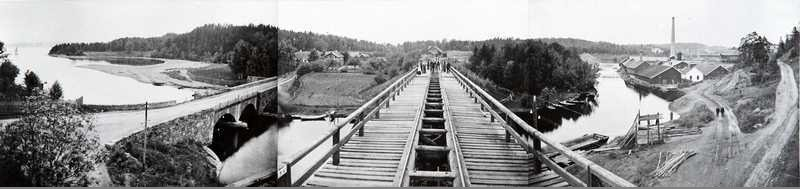
Looking across original wooden Lysaker Bridge at Lysaker Station in 1890

=== Bull's station ===
Proposals for a railway between Oslo and Drammen were launched in 1864 and planning commenced two years later. This involved deciding upon the location of the stations. Although the idea of placing one at the municipal centre of Sandvika was not met with protest, there was not consensus regarding the other and both Østre Stabekk and Lysaker were proposed. The latter was selected by the municipal council because of its vicinity to the Oslofjord and being located next to a waterfall.

The original station building at Lysaker was designed by Georg Andreas Bull. Lysaker Station and the Drammen Line opened on 7 October 1872. It had an immediate impact on the surrounding area, stimulating both commerce and construction of private dwellings.

=== Kielland's station ===
Bull's station building burned down in 1914 and was replaced two year later by a new. By then it was decided that the line past Lysaker would be upgraded and Lysaker became the first of many stations on the line to be designed as an elevated station. The tracks were thereby placed elevated with an island platform with the station on the side, as the first station in Norway designed for double-track operation. The new station was designed in Baroque Revival by Adalbert Kielland at NSB Arkitektkontor. One year later the wooden bridge over Lysakerelven was replaced by a stone bridge.

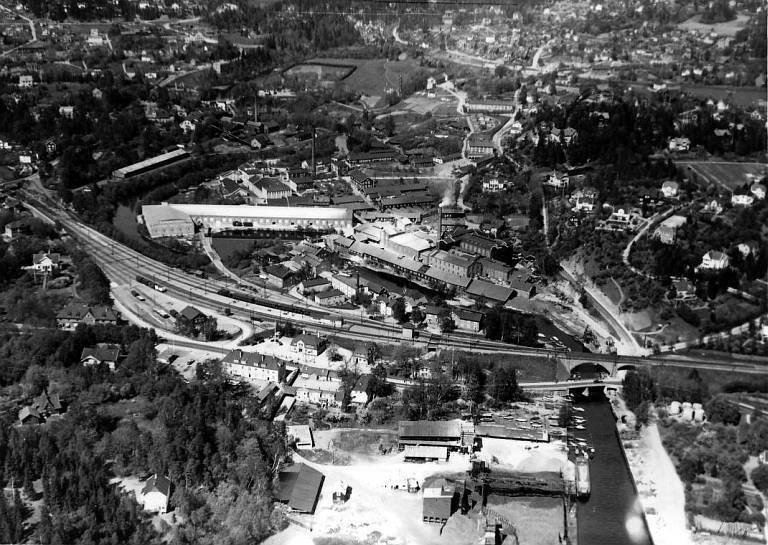
The station and surroundings in 1937

The line from Sandvika to Oslo was substantially upgraded between 1917 and 1922. From 27 February 1917 a passing loop was built at Lysaker and standard gauge traffic was carried out on the northern track. A southern track was then built, which was used by narrow gauge trains. However, both were dual gauge. All–standard gauge operations commenced on 9 February 1920, although the dual gauge was not removed until 1922. Electric traction started operation on 30 August 1922. An interlocking system was installed on 29 July 1924. From 1922 a half-hour headway was introduced on the local trains between Sandvika and Oslo West Station.

During World War II Lysaker Station was hit by five sabotage missions by the Norwegian resistance movement, in which tanks of gasoline, attached or not attached to railroad cars, were blown up. The sabotages took place on 16 December 1944 and 9, 10, 12 and 13 January 1945. On 13 January a tanker truck was attacked as well. There were three additional attacks on Lysaker in 1944 and 1945, two of them against factories and workshops. Also, the Lysaker Bridge sabotage took place in the immediate vicinity of the station.

=== Henriksen's station ===
A full upgrade of the station was carried out in 1987. A main incentive was that the Norwegian Public Roads Administration wanted the station building removed to make room for a new interchange towards Jar. Therefore, Kielland's station building was demolished in 1987. The new station building, designed by NSB Arkitektkontor and Arne Henriksen, was built in glass and concrete with a dominant portal presenting the staircases. On the island platform a new ticket booth was built in steel and glass. The platform was covered by a roof of laminated wood and plywood held up by galvanized steel columns. The roof followed the shape of the curved platform and featured a gable.

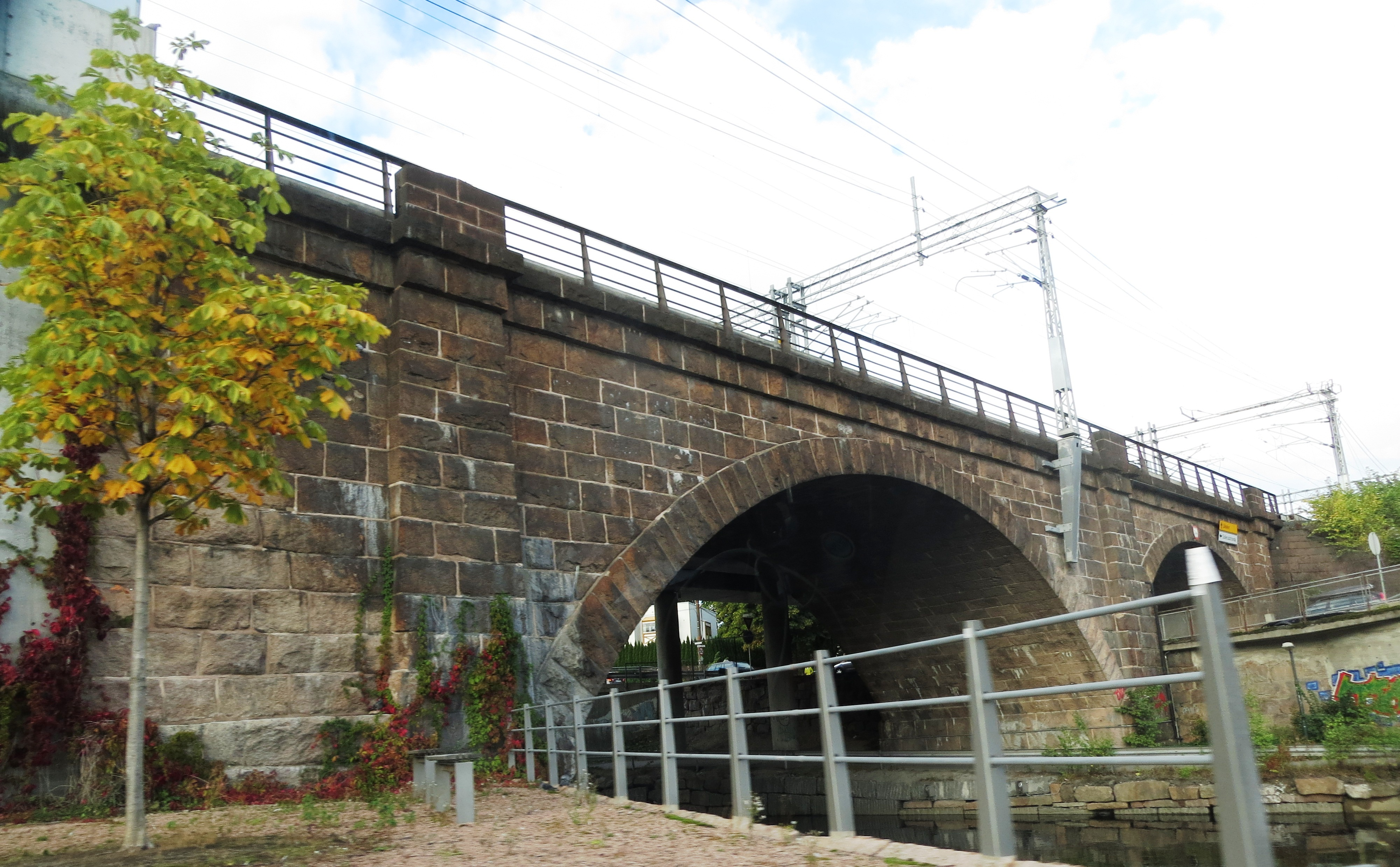
Vollsveien Bridge, located immediately east of the station, was constructed in 1915.

Lysaker Station was the closest railway station to Oslo Airport, Fornebu. From 27 May 1990, Scandinavian Airlines System and the Norwegian State Railways started a cooperation to better the connection between rail and airline services. The project included the station being branded as Lysaker/Fornebu and dedicated shuttle buses running from the station to the airport terminal. NSB changed their scheduled so all InterCity Express and long-distance trains on the Drammen Line started stopping at Lysaker.

Lysaker Station received centralized traffic control on 3 December 1992 and after that it has only been staffed for ticket sales. The Airport Express Train stated calling at Lysaker Station on 8 October 1998, the same day that Oslo Airport, Fornebu was closed. The Lysaker/Fornebu name was in use until 9 January 2000. By then the amount of traffic to Lysaker was so substantial, even without the airport, that NSB continues to stop its express trains at Lysaker.

=== Snøhetta's station ===
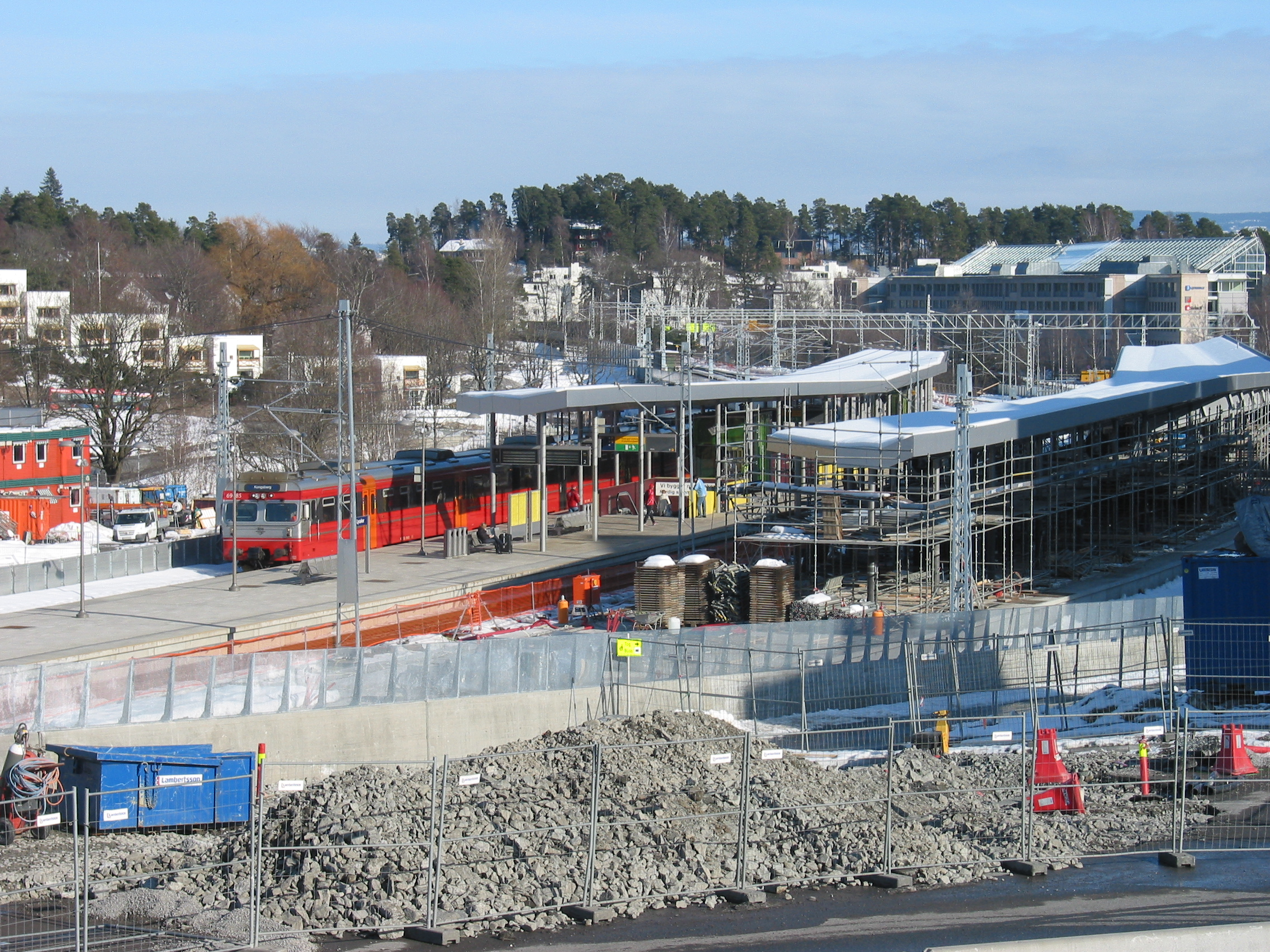
Construction was well underway in March 2009.

Proposals for an upgrade of the Drammen Line to accommodate more trains started in 1991. This resulted in the Asker Line, which was built in two steps between 2005 and 2011. Ahead of the section stage, consisting of the Bærum Tunnel which would allow trains to run directly from Lysaker to Sandvika, Lysaker Station received a full modernization. The upgrades consisted of demolishing the existing station and building a new station with two island platforms. Snøhetta won the architecture competition for the station. The upgrades allowed several advantages: seven minutes shorter travel time west of Oslo combined with better regularity, trains previously turning at Skøyen Station could instead turn at Lysaker and a near doubling of the number of trains running through the West Corridor, allowing eleven more trains per hour.

The zoning plan for the station was passed in 1998 and demands for accessibility were laid down in 2003, causing a contrast between these goals and the curved platforms. This would particularly be a challenge for the Class 70 trains, which would have a wide gap. Part of the dispute centered on the Vollsveien Bridge, whether or not it had a heritage status and whether or not its demolition would allow for a straight station. Minister of Transport and Communication Torild Skogsholm stated that she laid the blame on director of the National Rail Administration, Steinar Killi. Her successor, Liv Signe Navarsete, announced in July 2006 that the construction would continue following the curved design, though minor functional changes would be made.

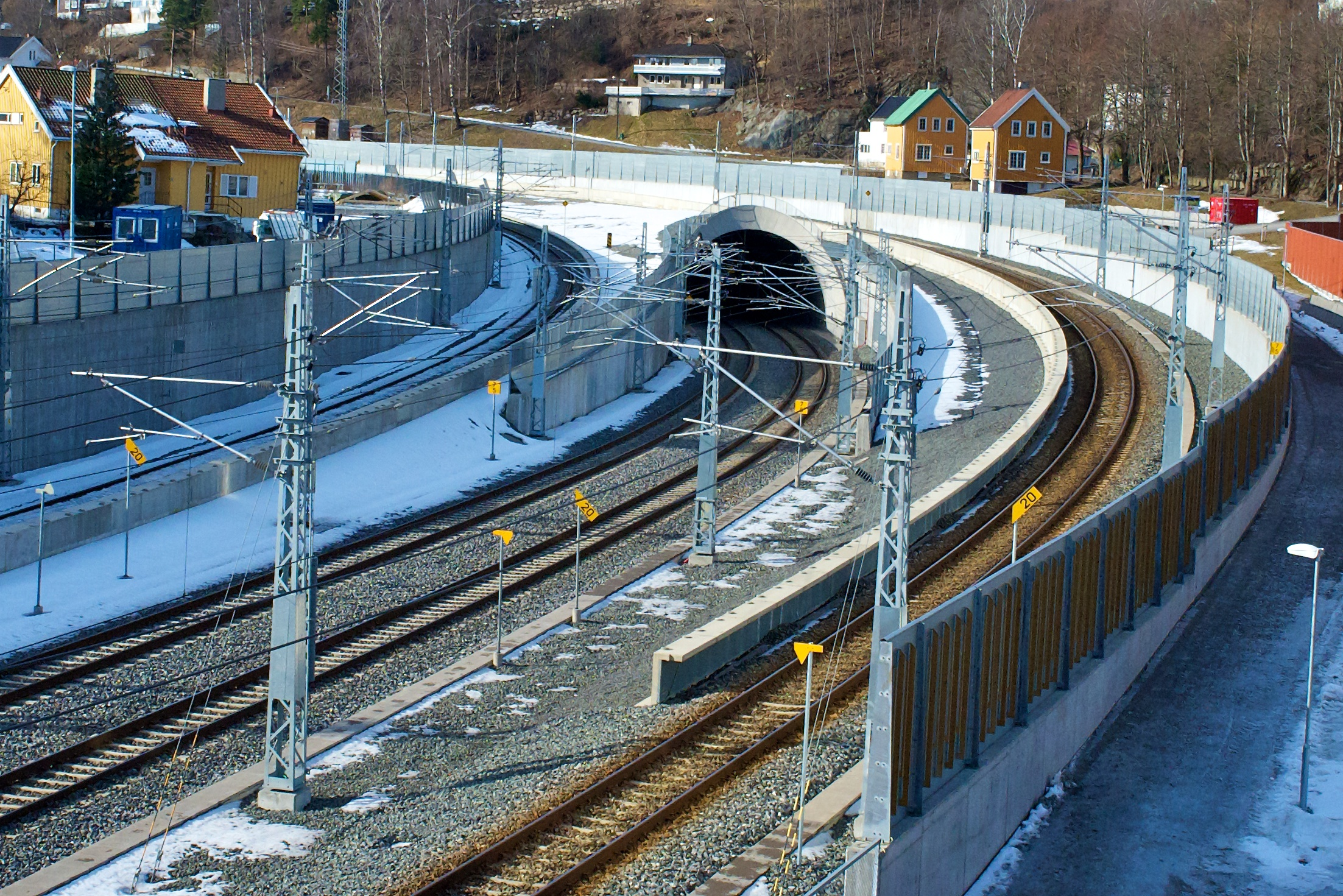
The Lysaker end of the Bærum Tunnel

During the late 1970s there arose plans to build a branch line from the Drammen Line to Oslo Airport, Fornebu. Initial plans called for it to split from the Drammen Line some 300 meters (980 ft) east of Lysaker and then pass under Lysaker Station. It would then continue to the airport, but without the possibility for stopping at Lysaker. Later the plans were reformulated and for a while a people mover was a preferred mode. By 2007 Ruter had changed their opinion in the matter and instead wanted to operate a light rail to Fornebu. The Rail Administration therefore decided to remove the station hall for a people mover from the Lysaker Station plans. Because the people mover was canceled after construction of the station had started, the National Rail Administration has claimed the county for NOK 31 million to cover losses incurred.

The work stretched over a segment of 1.2 kilometers (0.75 mi) of line. Construction started in February 2006 with work on expanding Granfoss Bridge, both lengthening it and building one parallel to it to allow four tracks. From May work commenced on the first new platform, which was completed in February 2007 and all traffic moved to the new tracks and platform. Then the old platform was demolished and a second new platform built, which was completed in 2009. The work took 776,000 man-hours and cost NOK 1.2 billion. The station was brought into use on 3 August 2009, being officially opened on 1 September 2009. The Bærum Tunnel opened on 26 August 2011. To allow more trains to terminate at Lysaker, a suitable place to turn trains needed to be built. Høvik Station was chosen and received three new tracks. With its completion on 14 December 2014 almost all trains previously terminating at Skøyen were extended to Lysaker.

== Facilities ==
Lysaker Station is situated on the Drammen Line, 7.00 kilometers (4.35 mi) from Oslo Central Station at an elevation of 7.5 meters (25 ft) above mean sea level. Lysaker is an elevated station with two island platforms and four tracks. To the east of the station the line runs across a bridge over Lysakerelven before the four tracks merge to two. West of the station the Drammen Line splits, with two tracks becoming the Asker Line and running into the Bærum Tunnel.

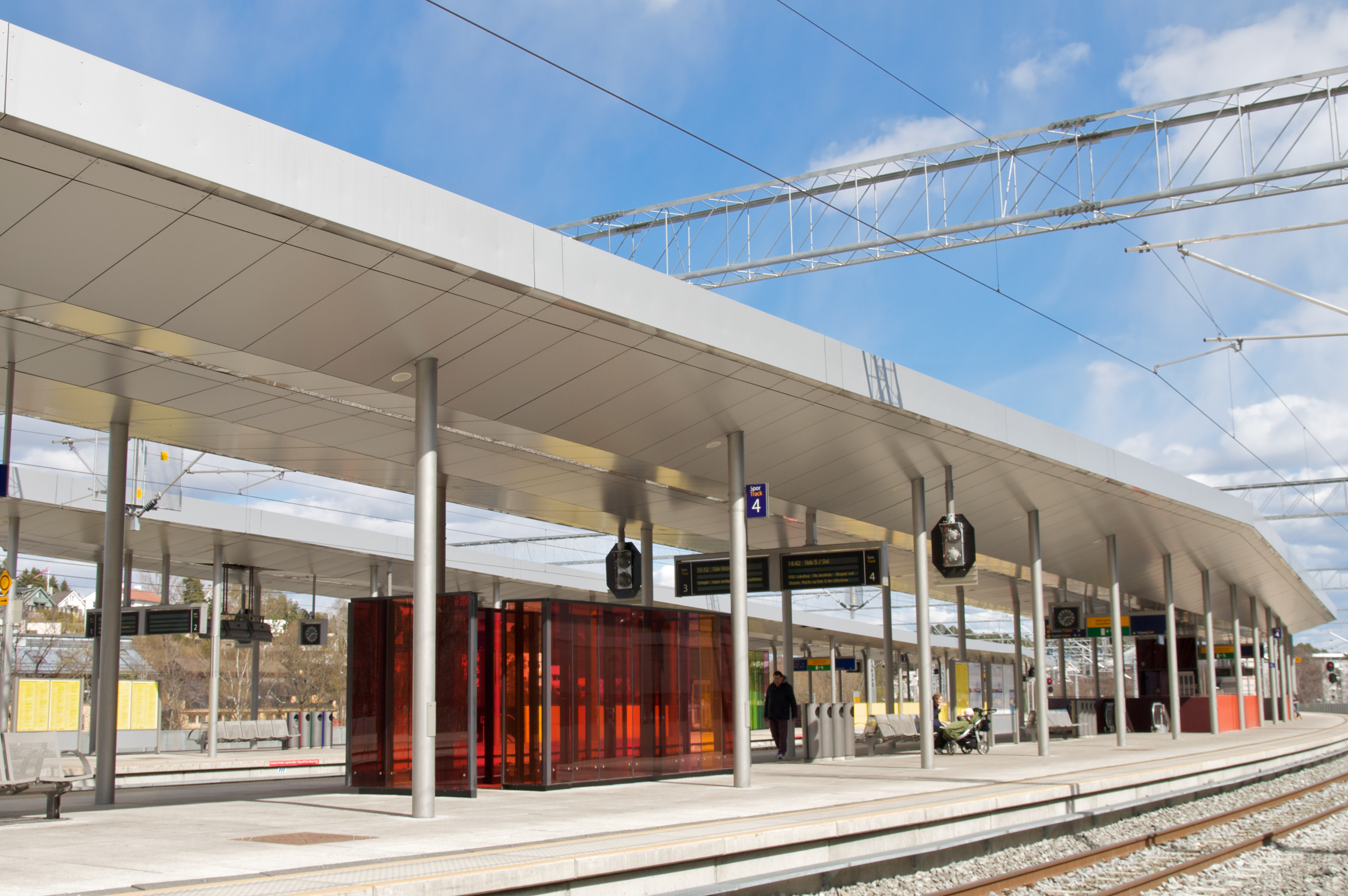
Platforms

The station is unstaffed, but features ticket machines, a waiting room, kiosk and taxicab stand. There is parking nearby in a parking house. The bus station features two sections, one for local buses and one for regional buses. Between them they have six stops. However, because of the design of European Road E18, the station can only serve buses on the E18 which runs westwards—eastbound buses are served by a bus stop on the other side of the freeway. Ownership and operation of the bus terminal is carried out by Akershus Kollektivterminaler.

Lysaker is dominated by offices and more than ninety percent of the station's patronage is related to work. As of 2009 there were 25,000 jobs within 800 meters (2,600 ft) of the station and the area is among the fastest growing office areas in Greater Oslo. Lysaker remains the train station serving Fornebu, via bus shuttles, where there are another 12,000 jobs.

== Service ==
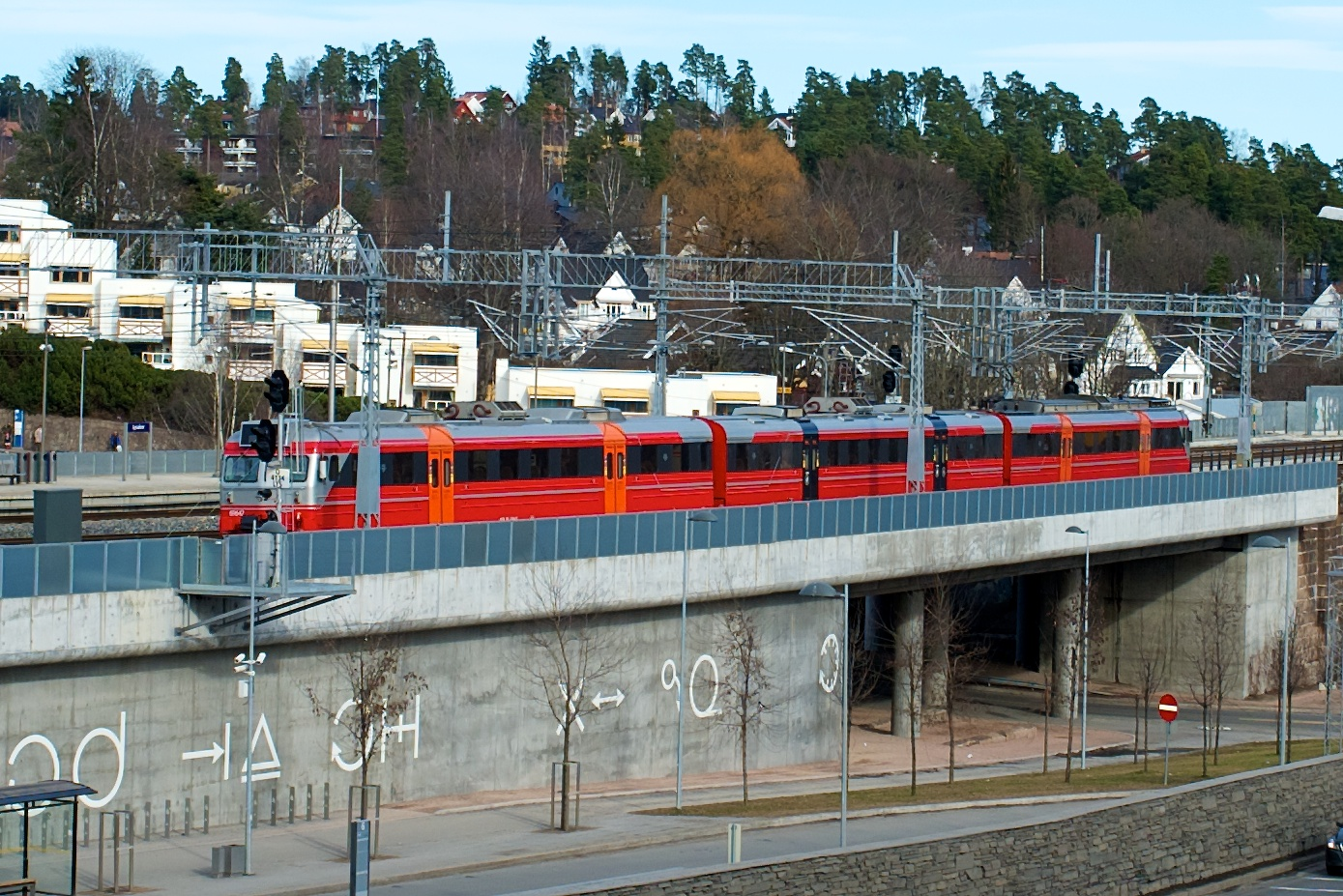
NSB Class 69 train at Lysaker

Vy serves Lysaker station both with Oslo Commuter Rail trains as well as regional trains. Up to five daily express trains along the Sørlandet Line and the stop at Lysaker. It also serves an hourly headway of the R10 regional trains from the Drammen Line and Dovre Line. There are five hourly trains heading to Asker via the Asker Line, including the L12, L13 and L14. Westwards L12 runs to Kongsberg while they eastwards serve the Gardermoen Line, Trunk Line and the Kongsvinger Line. L1, a full-stop service on the Trunk- and Drammen Line, runs every thirty minutes. A rush-hour service line L2x, serving the Østfold Line, also serves Lysaker.

The Airport Express Train runs five times an hour to Oslo Airport, Gardermoen. Ruter uses Lysaker Station as the main bus terminal for Lysaker. Lysaker Station is in fare zone 1 and is served by bus routes 23, 31, 31E, 32, 81, 130, 140, 140E, 150, 150E, 160, 160E, 250, 250E, 255E, 265E. There are about 1,400 daily buses that call at Lysaker. Ruter's B11 ferry to Nesoddtangen runs from a quay in the vicinity of the station.

== Bibliography ==
- Berthelsen, Jørn (28 December 1981). Reisen til flyplassen (in Norwegian). Institute of Transport Economics. ISBN 82-7133-343-7.
- Bakken, Tor Chr., ed. (2008). "Okkupasjonstiden: Sabotasjeaksjoner i Asker og Bærum". Budstikkas store Asker og Bærum-leksikon (in Norwegian). Oslo: Kunnskapsforlaget. ISBN 978-82-573-1534-4.
- Hartmann, Eivind; Mangset, Øistein; Reisegg, Øyvind (1997). Neste stasjon (in Norwegian). Gyldendal. ISBN 82-05-25294-7.
- Rasch-Engh, Rolf (2000). Lysaker – gammel boområde og næringssentrum (in Norwegian). Bærum: Lysaker Vel. ISBN 82-995729-0-8.
- Wisting, Tor (2002). Høvik Vel 100 år (in Norwegian). Bærum: Høvik Vel.

Preceding station	Express trains		Following station
Asker	F5	Stavanger-Kristiansand–Oslo S	Oslo S
Preceding station	Regional trains		Following station
Sandvika	RE10	Drammen–Oslo S–Lillehammer	Skøyen
Sandvika	RE11	Skien–Oslo S–Eidsvoll	Skøyen
Preceding station	Flytoget		Following station
Sandvika towards Drammen		FLY1	Skøyen towards Oslo Airport, Gardemoen
Stabekk Terminus		FLY2	Skøyen towards Oslo Airport, Gardemoen
Preceding station	Local trains		Following station
Stabekk	L1	Spikkestad–Oslo S–Lillestrøm	Skøyen
Stabekk	L2	Stabekk–Oslo S–Ski	Skøyen
Stabekk	L2	Oslo S–Kolbotn	Skøyen
Sandvika	R12	Kongsberg–Oslo S–Eidsvoll	Skøyen
Sandvika	R13	Drammen–Oslo S–Dal	Skøyen
Sandvika	R14	Asker–Oslo S–Kongsvinger	Skøyen
Stabekk	R21	Oslo S–Moss	Skøyen
