= Oslo Commuter Rail =

Commuter rail in Norway

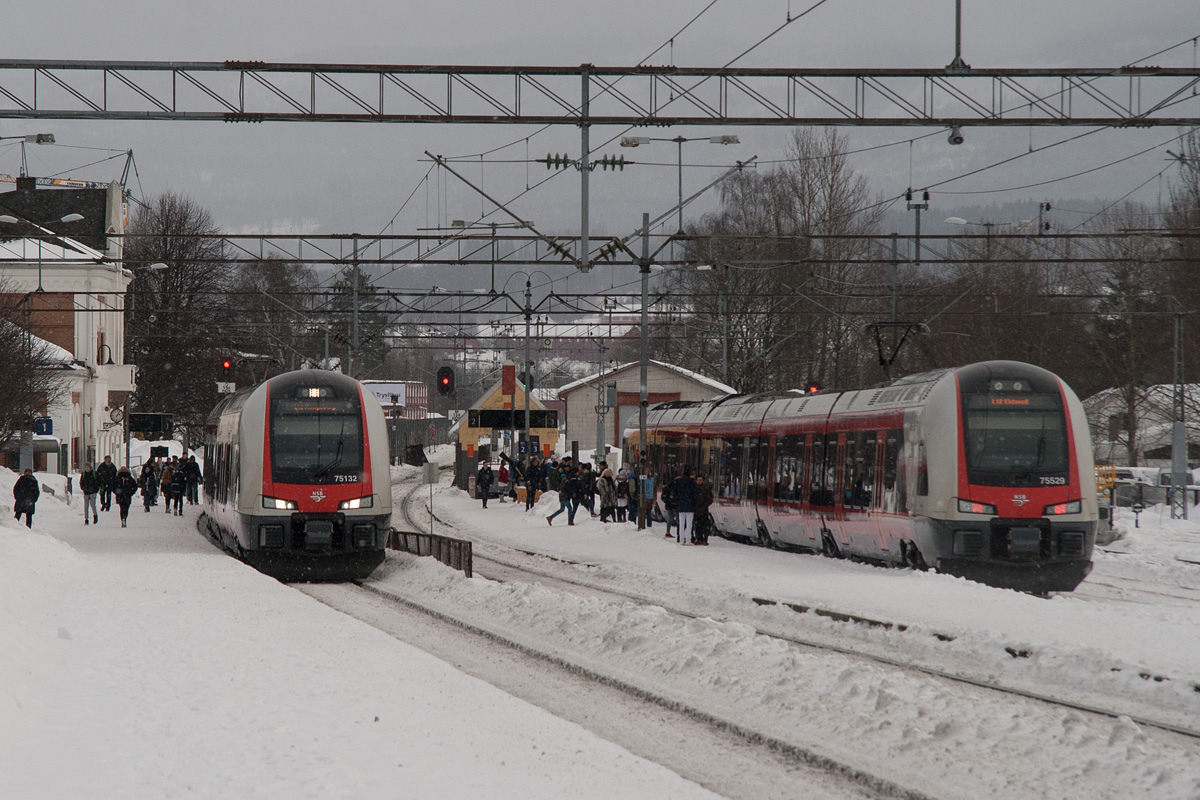

Overview
- Owner: Norwegian Railway Directorate
- Locale: Eastern Norway
- Transit type: Commuter rail
- Number of lines: 8
- Number of stations: 128
- Annual ridership: 41.4 million (2019)

Operation
- Began operation: 1902
- Operators: Vy; Vy Gjøvikbanen
- Number of vehicles: ? Class 69 ? Class 72 ? Class 74; 51+ Class 75

Technical
- System length: 553 km (344 mi)
- Track gauge: 1,435 mm (4 ft 8 1/2 in) standard gauge
- Electrification: 15 kV 16.7 Hz AC
- Top speed: 210 km/h (130 mph)

Oslo Commuter Rail (Norwegian: Lokaltog Østlandet) is a commuter rail centered in Oslo, Norway, connecting the capital to six counties in Eastern Norway. The system is operated by Vy (formerly NSB) and its subsidiary Vy Gjøvikbanen, using Class 69 and Class 72 electric multiple units (EMU). The network spans eight routes and 128 stations, with Oslo Central Station (Oslo S) as the central hub. The trains run on 553 kilometers (344 mi) of electrified mainline railway owned by the Bane NOR. Deficits are financed by the Norwegian Ministry of Transport, although the network also has a ticketing cooperation with Ruter, the public transport authority in Oslo and Akershus. The network is the longest commuter rail network in the Nordic countries, and among top ten in Europe.

The commuter rail operates mainly within Greater Oslo and two of the lines only provide services within the urban area. Six of the lines span beyond the urban area, reaching the counties of Østfold, Hedmark, Oppland and Buskerud. The system is also an airport rail link to Oslo Airport, Gardermoen. West of Oslo, the system uses the Drammen, Asker, Spikkestad and Sørland lines, north of Oslo it uses the Gjøvik Line, east of Oslo it uses the Trunk, Gardermoen and Kongsvinger lines and south of Oslo it follows the Østfold and Eastern Østfold lines.

The system's predecessors date back to the opening of the Trunk Line in 1854. By 1902, all the routes used by the present commuter rail had been taken into service. Electrification started in 1922, and Class 62 EMUs were introduced in 1931, followed by Class 65 units in 1936 and Class 67 in 1953. Electrification was completed in 1963. In 1980, the Drammen Line was connected to the rest of the system and all trains started operating to the new Oslo S. The high-speed Gardermoen Line opened in 1998. In 2013, new Stadler FLIRT units were taken into traffic, and the Asker Line was completed just before. In 2022, the Follo Line was opened.

Traditionally, Oslo Commuter Rail were defined as train lines called "Lokaltog" (local trains) in Norwegian. However, in 2022, a different definition was implemented. Only the two lines L1 and L2 are now defined as Lokaltog, and these go once per 15 minutes in each direction. All other lines in the network are now called "Regionaltog" (regional trains) and they have 30 or 60 minutes between departures and often take an hour from Oslo to the end station.

== Network ==
The Oslo Commuter Rail runs entirely on mainline railways owned and maintained by the Norwegian National Rail Administration. The commuter rail uses ten lines, utilizing a line length of 553 kilometers (344 mi). The lines are all electrified at 15 kV 16.7 Hz AC and consists of 128 stations. The Asker, Drammen, Gardermoen and Østfold lines, and part of the Trunk Line, have double track, accounting for 204 kilometers (127 mi), while the rest of the network has single track.

Oslo S is the central hub of the commuter rail. Located in the central business district of Oslo, all lines either terminate at, or run through the station. From Oslo S, there are four main corridors. All trains running through the West Corridor continue along either the North, South or East Corridor. Because there are more services in the latter three, some of these terminate at Oslo S. The line numbers for the commuter and the regional lines are such that those going along the Eastern and Western corridor (beyond Stabekk) have 1 and 10–14, those going along the Southern corridor have 2 and 20–22, and for the Northern corridor 3 and 30.

=== West ===
Along the West Corridor, the Drammen Line runs straight into the Oslo Tunnel, which starts directly beneath Oslo S. Trains run through Nationaltheatret, Norway's second-largest station, while in the tunnel. Just after surfacing, trains halt at Skøyen. One of the routes see their trains terminate at Skøyen, while the remaining nine continue onwards to Lysaker. After Lysaker, Line L1 continues stopping at all nine stations serving suburbs in Bærum and Asker, before reaching Asker Station, which serves as the terminus for most Line L1 services. For Line L1, Asker is 35 minutes and 24 kilometers (15 mi) from Oslo S.

Lines R12, R13 and R14 only call at Sandvika before Asker, and use the Asker Line between the two stations. Line R14 terminates at Asker. After Asker Station, Line L1 branches off along the Spikkestad Line and calls at six stations in Asker and Røyken before terminating at Spikkestad Station. Spikkestad is 44 minutes and 37 kilometers (23 mi) from Oslo S. Lines R12 and R13 continue through the Lieråsen Tunnel and make two more stops (R13) before reaching Drammen. Line R13 terminates at Drammen. Drammen is 39 minutes and 42 kilometers (26 mi) from Oslo S. Lines R12 continue, along the Sørland- and the Vestfold Lines, calling at seven stops in Eiker and Kongsberg before terminating at Kongsberg Station (R12).

=== East ===
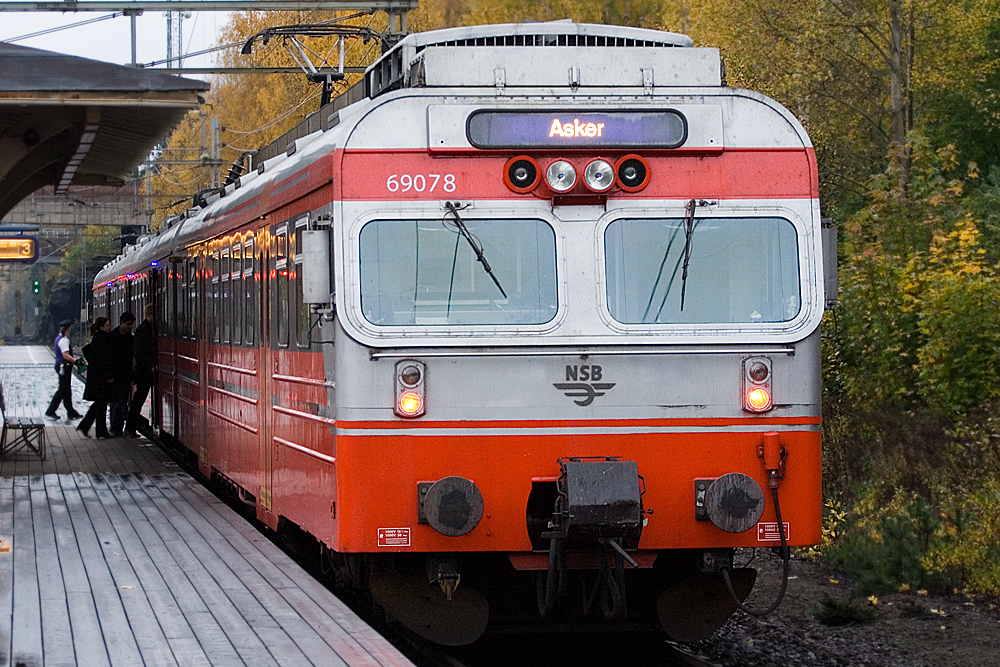
Commuters boarding a Class 69 unit at Lørenskog Station

Along the East Corridor, Line L1 follows the Trunk Line and makes twelve stops serving suburban areas in Oslo, Lørenskog and Skedsmo before reaching Lillestrøm Station, where the line terminates. For Line L1, Lillestrøm is located 29 minutes and 21 kilometres (13 mi) from Oslo S. Lines R12, R13 and R14 use the Gardermoen Line and the Romerike Tunnel to run directly to Lillestrøm. From there, lines R12 and R13 run along the Trunk Line (R13) and the Gardermoen Line, making four (R13) and no stops, respectively. After Kløfta Station, Line R13 continues along the Trunk Line, making three more stops until terminating at Dal Station. Dal is 34 minutes and 57 kilometers (35 mi) from Oslo S. Line R12 calls at Oslo Airport Station and Eidsvoll Verk Station before terminating at Eidsvoll Station. Eidsvoll is 51 minutes and 64 kilometers (40 mi) from Oslo S. Line R14 branches from Lillestrøm and operates along the Kongsvinger Line. It calls at thirteen stations and enters Hedmark after Årnes Station. Årnes is 53 minutes and 58 kilometers (36 mi) from Oslo S. After Årnes, trains call at another station, Skarnes before reaching Kongsvinger Station, which is 1 hour and 10 minutes, and 100 kilometers (62 mi) from Oslo S.

=== South ===
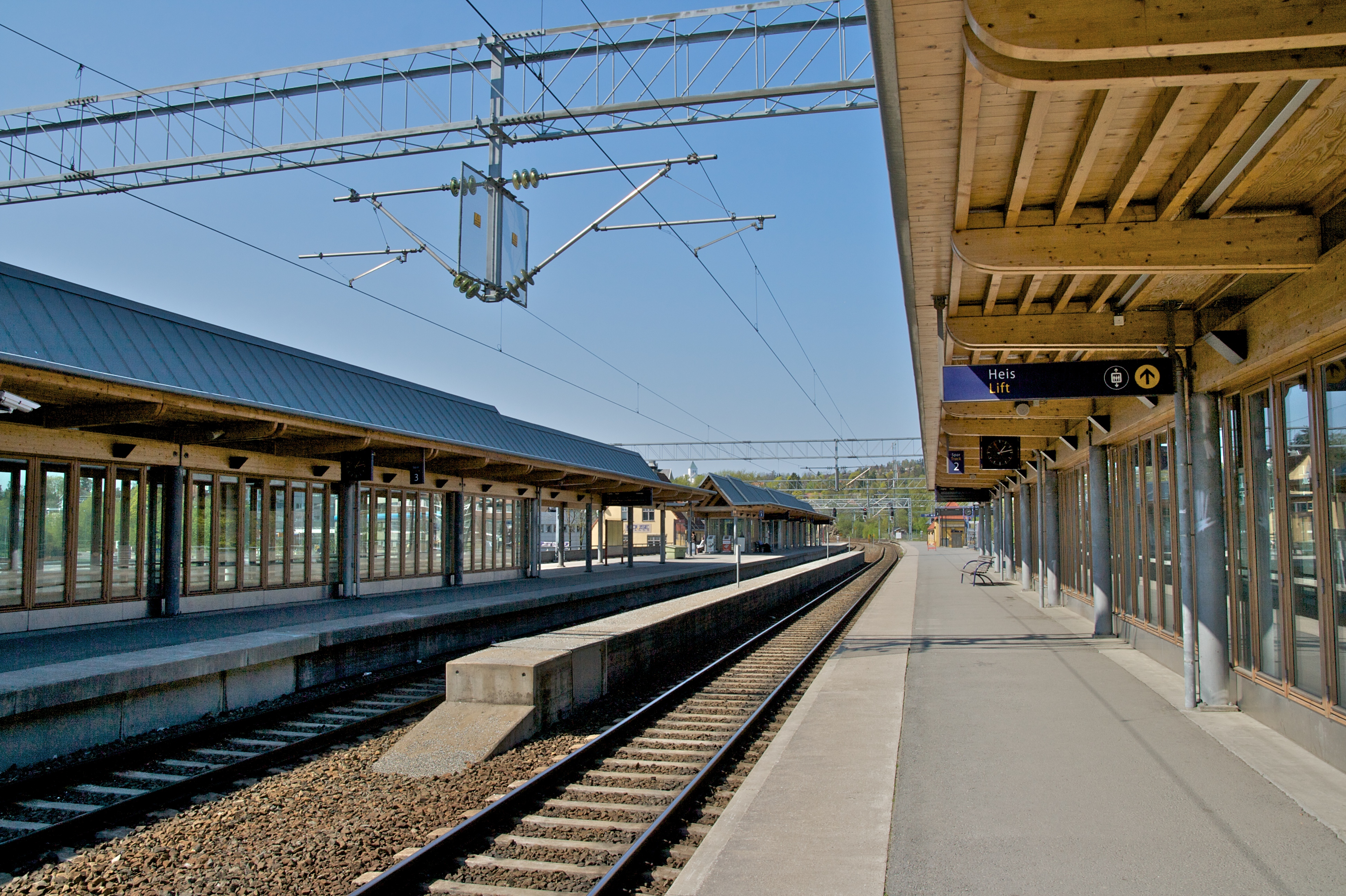
Skøyen Station is the terminus for one service

Along the South Corridor, there is since end of 2022 a tunnel, Blix Tunnel for fast trains without any stops before Ski Station, which includes lines R21, R22 and R23. The opening of this tunnel gave reason for a change in the Oslo regional and commuter rail systems. Line L2 follows the old Østfold Line and makes 13 stops before terminating at Ski Station, which is 31 minutes and 24 kilometers (15 mi) from Oslo S. Southwards, Line R21 follows the Western Østfold Line with four intermediate stops before Moss, which is 49 minutes and 60 kilometers (37 mi) from Oslo S. Line R22 runs along the Eastern Østfold Line with 11 intermediate stops before Rakkestad Station, which is 1 hour and 5 minutes and 63 kilometers (39 mi) from Oslo S.

=== North ===
North of Oslo, NSB Gjøvikbanen operates along the Gjøvik Line. Trains operate either to Hakadal Station or Jaren Station (R31) or Gjøvik Station (RE30). The lines call at 17 (R31) or 16 (RE30) stations north of Oslo S. Hakadal is 43 minutes and 32 kilometers (20 mi) from Oslo S, while Jaren is 1 hour and 25 minutes, and 72 kilometers (45 mi) from Oslo S.

== Service ==
Seven of the lines are operated by Vy, owned by the Norwegian Ministry of Transport, while the Gjøvik Line is operated by the Vy-owned Vy Gjøvikbanen. The operating deficit is covered by the state for Vy's lines, while Vy Gjøvikbanen's routes are financed by a public service obligation. The trains have two sections, manned and unmanned. Validated ticket-holders can travel in the unmanned section, which have green doors. Manned sections, with gray doors, have a conductor and allow passengers to purchase tickets. Tickets are available at ticket machines at stations; if bought on board, there is an additional 20 Norwegian krone (NOK) fee.

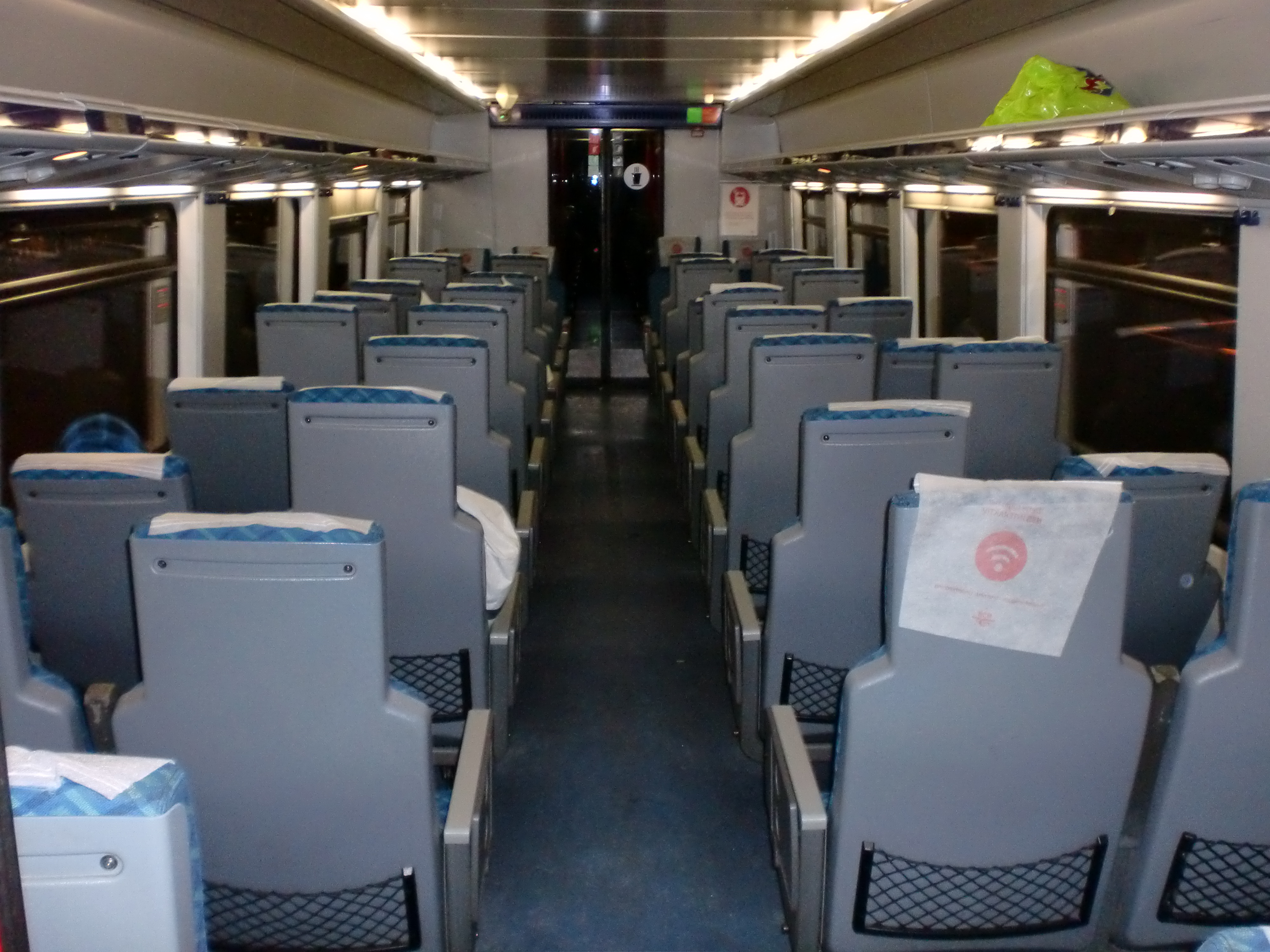
Interior of a Class 69D multiple unit

Two of the lines, L1 and L2, are designated as providing inner services. These operate along the Drammen Line to Asker, along the Trunk Line to Lillestrøm and the Østfold Line to Ski, stopping at all stations. The six other line, which make up the outer services, only make occasional stops on these sections. The inner services operate with a normal headway of 30 minutes, with 15 minutes offered in one direction during rush hour. In late evening and parts of the weekend, this is further reduced to 60 minutes. Vy's outer routes operate with a normal headway of 60 minutes, with rush-hour services offered at 30-minute intervals and late evening service provided every 120 minutes. Services between Årnes and Kongsvinger is limited to five daily services, and from Mysen to Rakkestad with four daily services. The Gjøvik Line runs with a 40-minute headway, with three different stopping patterns. One calls at all stations until Hakadal, one calls at most stations until Jaren, while one is an express service that runs the line's full length to Gjøvik.

Within Oslo and Akershus, Vy has an agreement with the public transport authority Ruter to use their fares and ticketing system to ease transfer between the commuter rail and other forms of public transport. Ruter makes use of a zone system, including a single-zone fare within Oslo. From 2010, the contactless ticket system Flexus is being introduced. In Oslo, there is transfer to the Oslo Metro at Oslo S (to Jernbanetorget), at Nationaltheatret and at Grefsen (to Storo). Transfer to the Oslo Tramway is possible from Oslo S, Nationaltheatret, Skøyen and Grefsen. At Moss, there is transfer to the Moss–Horten Ferry. Line L12 provides connection to Norway's main international airport, Oslo Airport, Gardermoen.

== Rolling stock ==
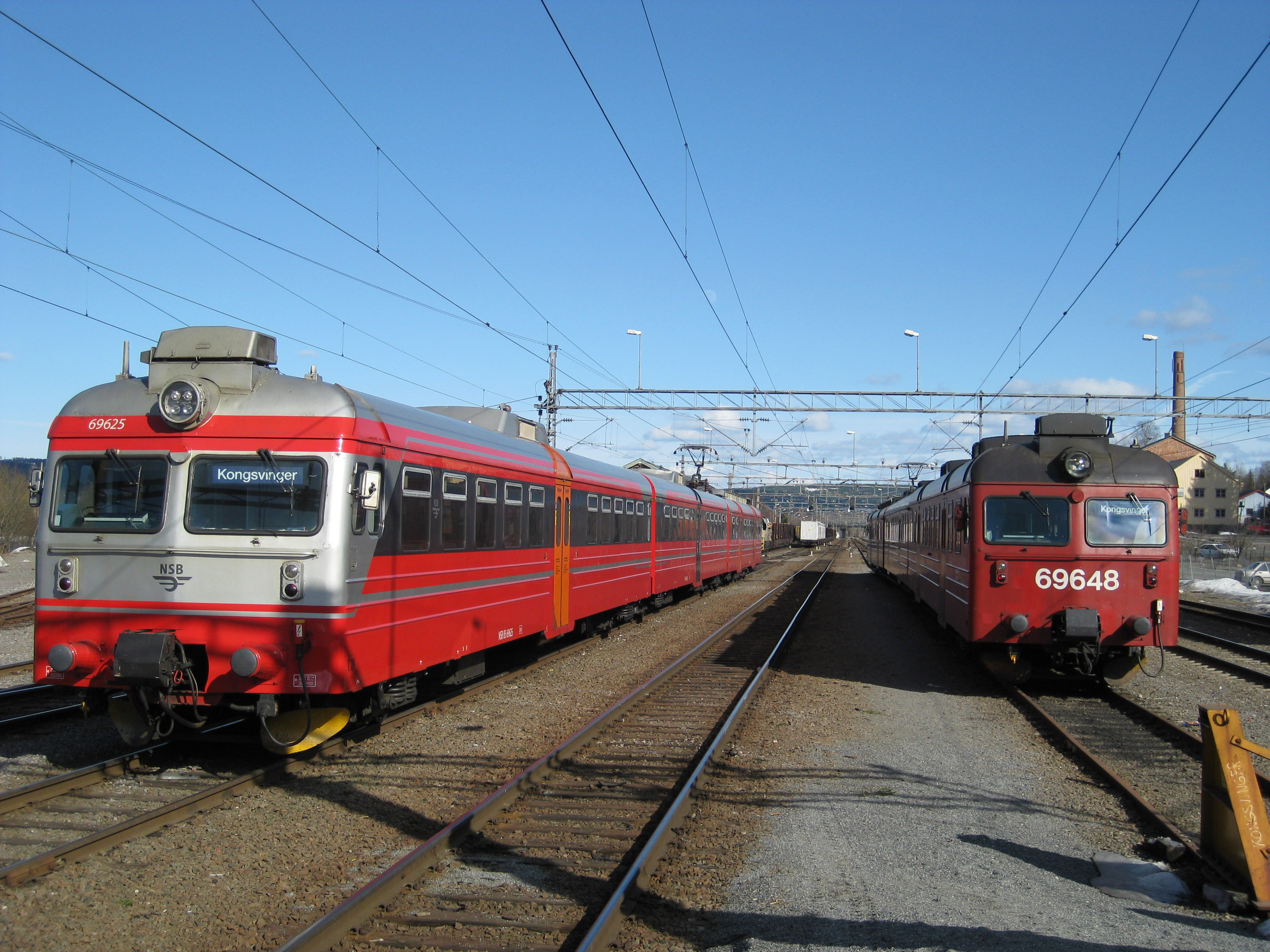
Two Class 69 units at Kongsvinger Station; new livery to the left, old livery to the right

Class 69 is a series of 88 two and three-car electric multiple units built by Strømmens Værksted between 1970 and 1993. A motor car has a power output of 1,188 kilowatts (1,593 hp), allowing a speed of 130 kilometers per hour (81 mph). Each car is 24.85 meters (81.5 ft) long, with motor cars weighing 64.0 to 53.9 tonnes (63.0 to 53.0 long tons; 70.5 to 59.4 short tons) and end cars weighing down to 28.8 tonnes (28.3 long tons; 31.7 short tons). Typical seating capacity is 96 passengers in the motor cars and 112 passengers in the end cars. The class was delivered in four versions, named A through D. After the initial delivery of fifteen 69As in 1970 and 1971, twenty 69Bs were delivered in 1974 and 1975. These were designed to operate on longer sections and were equipped with only one door per car. This turned out to extend stopping time too much, and the C and D versions were delivered with two doors per car. From 1975 to 1977, NSB took delivery of fourteen 69Cs and from 1983 to 1993 thirty-nine 69Ds. The latter is distinguishable because of its different front. Vy operates both two- and three-car sets, and up to three units can be run in multiple, allowing Vy to operate any train length from two to nine cars. Eighty-two units remain in service, although some of those are used on the Bergen Commuter Rail and the Arendal Line.

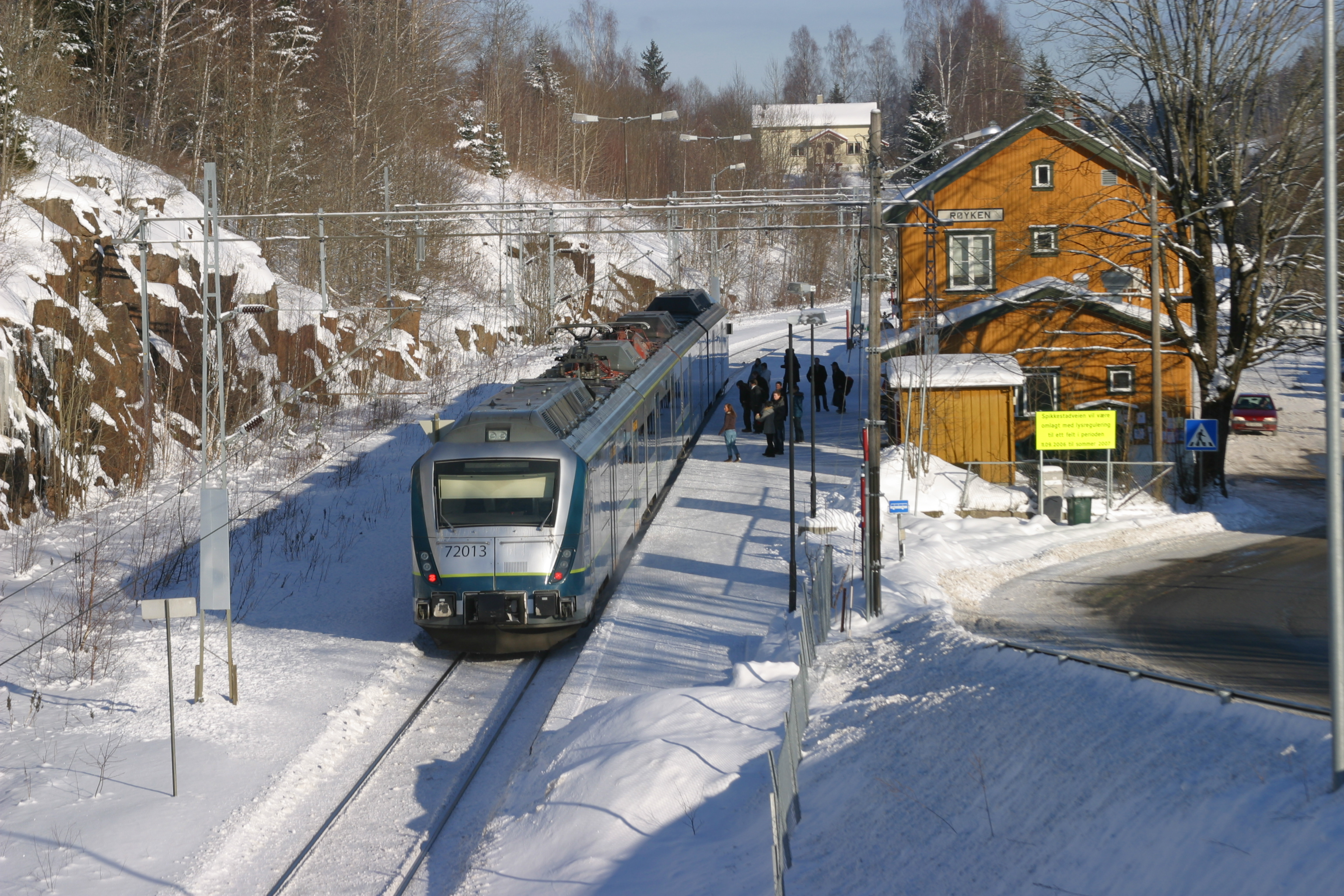
A Class 72 unit at Røyken Station

Class 72 is a series of 36 four-car electric multiple units built by AnsaldoBreda. The units are permanently coupled together using Jacobs bogies. Each unit has a power output of 2,550 kilowatts (3,420 hp), allowing a top speed of 160 kilometers per hour (99 mph). The trains are 85.57 meters (280.7 ft) long and weigh 156 tonnes (154 long tons; 172 short tons), and have seating for 310 passengers and one toilet. The trains have better accessibility than Class 69 and unlike their predecessors are equipped with an electronic public information system. Some of the 36 units are used on the Jæren Commuter Rail.

42 new electric multiple units called Class 75 were delivered 2013–2015. Similar units called Class 74 adopted for regional rail were delivered in 2012–2013.

=== Retired ===
Class 62 was a series of four multiple units built in 1931 and 1933 by Skabo Jernbanevognfabrikk and Norsk Elektrisk & Brown Boveri (NEBB). The units had a power output of 344 kilowatts (461 hp), giving a top speed of 70 kilometers per hour (43 mph). The motor cars were built in wood, were 20.60 meters (67.6 ft) long, weighed 43.2 tonnes (42.5 long tons; 47.6 short tons) and seated 73 passengers. They ran mostly on the Drammen Line and were in service around Oslo from 1931 to 1953.

Class 65 and Class 67 were two similar series of electric multiple units, all built by Skabo and NEBB. Class 65 was delivered in three versions, named A through C. Class A and B were rebuilt passenger wagons. Fourteen units of Class 65A were built from 1936 to 1939 and had a wooden body. Thirteen units of Class 65B were delivered in 1941 and 1942 and was built with a steel frame. They were 22 centimeters (8.7 in) longer than the A-series. Twenty-two Class 65C units were built from 1949 to 1952. From 1949 to 1950, 17 middle and end cars were delivered for the Class 65 units. Class 67 was a series of 18 units built from 1953 to 1955. They had a slightly more advanced technological system, but were otherwise often run mixed with Class 65 units. The Class 65 motor cars had a power output of 464 kilowatts (622 hp) and a top speed of 70 kilometers per hour (43 mph). They were 20.70 meters (67.9 ft) long, weighed 42.5 to 46.6 tonnes (41.8 to 45.9 long tons; 46.8 to 51.4 short tons) and had a seating capacity for 66 passengers. Class 65 remained in service until 1993 and Class 67 until 1995.

Many Class 69 units were taken out from traffic in 2013–2015, replaced by Class 75 units.

== History ==
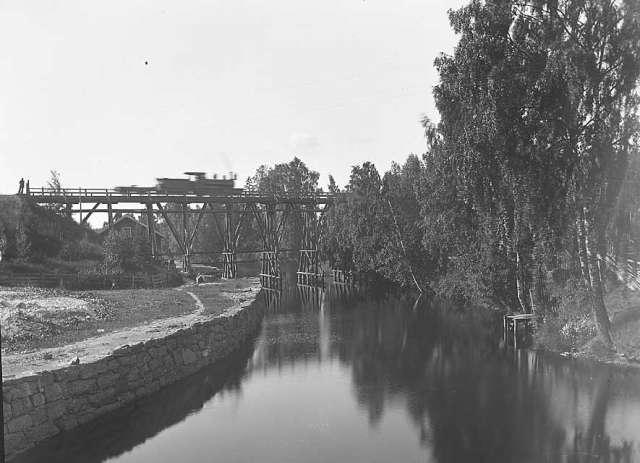
Steam locomotive passing over Sandvikselven in the 1880s

The first part of what is now the Oslo Commuter Rail was the Trunk Line, which opened on 1 September 1854 between Oslo East Station (Oslo Ø, located at the same place as the current Oslo S), and Eidsvoll. The line was at first private, although it was nationalized in 1926. On 3 October 1862, the Kongsvinger Line opened from Lillestrøm to Kongsvinger. The Østfold Line opened from Oslo Ø to Moss and onwards to Halden on 2 January 1879, followed by the Eastern Østfold Line from Ski via Mysen to Sarpsborg on 24 November 1882.

West of Oslo, the first part of the current commuter rail was the Randsfjord Line (parts of which have since become part of the Sørland Line), which opened on 15 November 1866 between Drammen and Vikersund. The Sørland Line from Hokksund to Kongsberg opened on 10 November 1871 and connected to the Randsfjord Line. On 7 October 1872, the Drammen Line opened from Oslo West Station (Oslo V) to Drammen. This line, along with the section from Drammen to Kongsberg, were built with 1,067 mm (3 ft 6 in) narrow gauge and did not connect to the main station of Oslo Ø. The Gjøvik Line opened from Grefsen to Jaren on 20 December 1900, and from Oslo Ø to Grefsen and from Jaren to Gjøvik on 28 November 1902.

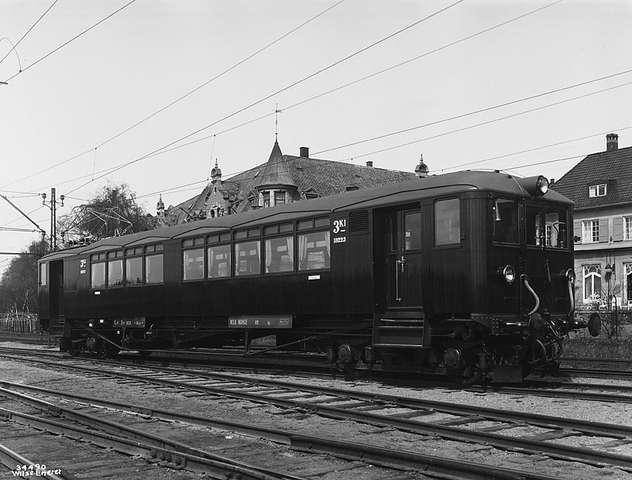
Class 62 multiple unit at Skillebekk Station in 1929

In 1903 and 1904, the Trunk Line was upgraded to double track. The section from Drammen to Kongsberg was converted to standard gauge on 1 November 1909. Between 1917 and 1920, dual gauge was laid between Oslo V and Drammen, and from 13 November 1922, the Drammen Line was entirely operated with standard gauge. The first electrification of NSB's lines was put into service on 26 October 1922 on the Drammen Line between Oslo V and Brakerøya. The section from Oslo V to Sandvika was upgraded to double track on 26 November 1922. From 1922, NSB introduced El 1-hauled passenger trains on the Drammen Line, and later other lines.

The next electrification occurred on the Trunk Line from Oslo Ø to Lillestrøm on 1 September 1927, the Randsfjord Line from Drammen to Kongsberg on 10 April 1929 and the Drammen Line from Drammen to Brakerøya on 6 May 1930. El 5 locomotives were acquired for the Trunk Line. Electric multiple units were put into service in 1931, with the delivery of four Class 62 units on the route from Oslo V to Sandvika. These proved not to be sufficiently powerful for the large traffic and were later moved to less used services from Oslo V to Asker or Heggedal. The class remained on the commuter rail service until 1953.

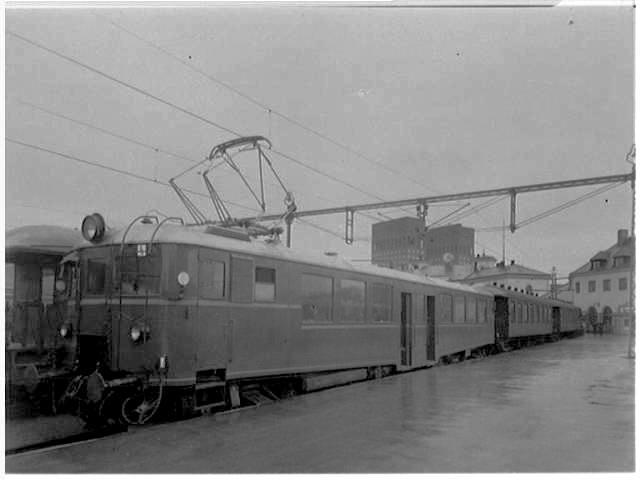
Class 65 multiple unit at Oslo V in 1939

From 1936, NSB took delivery of Class 65 multiple units, replacing El 1 as the primary hauler on the electrified commuter rail network. Class 65 were the first that were optimized for local traffic, with wide doors and turnable seats. NSB took delivery of 49 units until 1952, although they were also used outside the commuter rail network. The Østfold Line was upgraded to double track and put into service in four sections: from Bekkelaget to Ljan on 1 June 1924, from Oslo Ø to Bekkelaget on 15 May 1929, from Ljan to Kolbotn on 15 December 1936 and from Kolbotn to Ski on 14 May 1939. The Østfold Line was also the next line to be electrified, which opened in sections between 1936 and 1940. NSB took into use El 8 locomotives on the line.

On 15 June 1953, the Trunk Line from Lillestrøm to Eidsvoll took electrification into use. Further upgrades on the Drammen Line installing double track were put into service on 24 July 1953 from Billingstad to Hvalstad, on 29 November 1955 from Hvalstad to Asker and on 9 November 1958 from Sandvika to Billingstad. Between 1953 and 1955, NSB took delivery of 18 Class 67 multiple units. While visually similar to Class 65, they had improved technology and reliability. On 1 February 1961, the Gjøvik Line from Oslo Ø to Tøyen was put into service with double track and the line from Oslo Ø to Jaren put into service as electrified. Double track from Tøyen to Grefsen opened on 27 May 1962 and the sections from Jaren to Gjøvik was electrified in 1963.

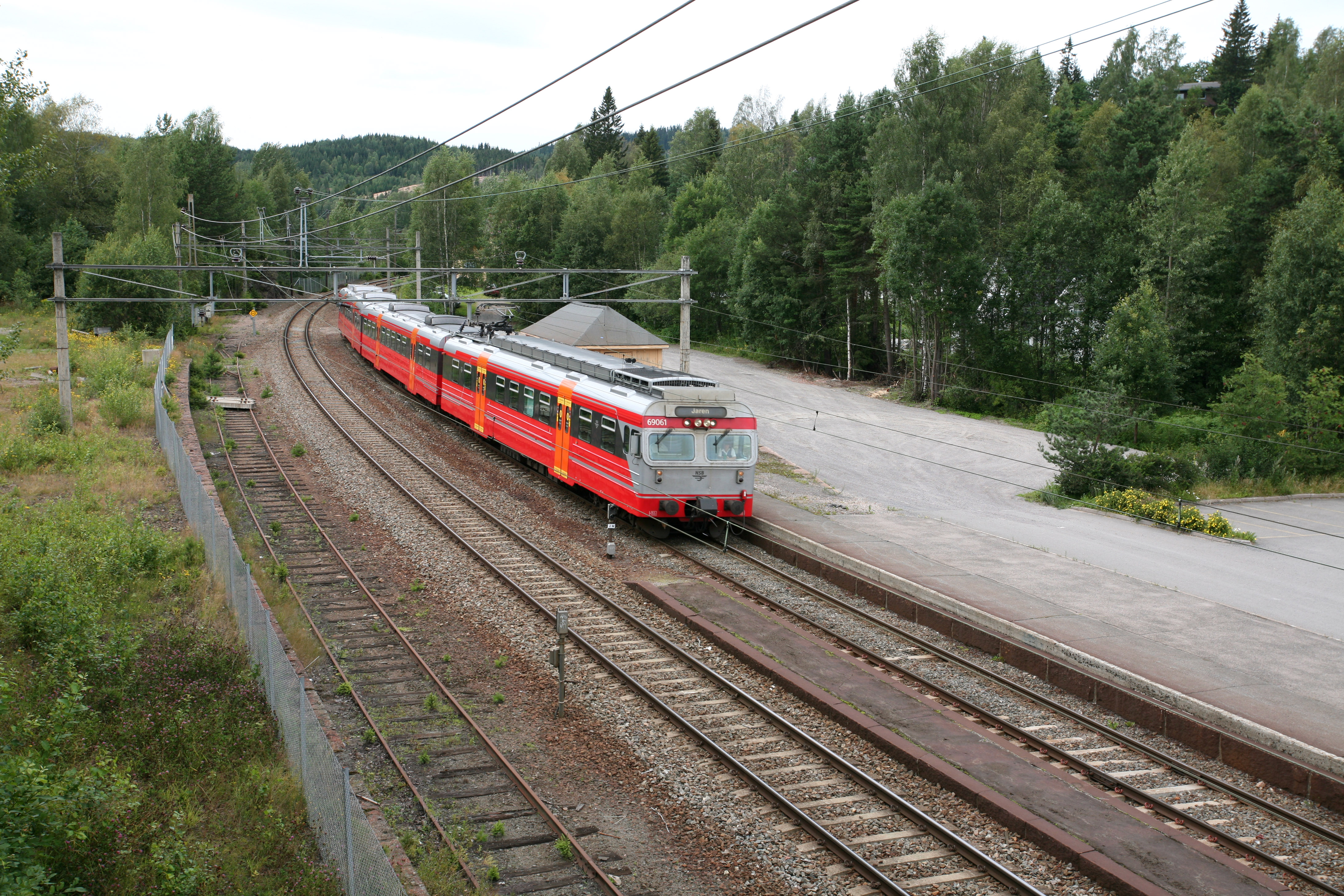
NSB Gjøvikbanen, here at Nittedal Station, won the bid to operate the Gjøvik Line for ten years, starting in 2006.

In the 1960s, NSB found the need for a new generation of trains. Class 69 was built in aluminum and were longer, allowing for more passengers per car. They had a maximum speed of 130 kilometres per hour (81 mph); this had a significant cost impact, as it allowed not only faster travel time, but allowed the services from Oslo Ø to Lillestrøm and Ski to run fast enough to dispense with one third of the previous number of units. Combined with the increased size, NSB could replace three three-car trains with two two-car trains. At the same time, some smaller stops were terminated to allow faster travel time. Eighty-eight units were delivered in four series between 1970 and 1993, with later series having a three-car configuration. On 3 June 1973, the 10.7-kilometer (6.6 mi) long Lieråsen Tunnel opened, shortening the Drammen Line by 11.7 kilometers (7.3 mi). The 13.7-kilometer (8.5 mi) long section from Asker to Spikkestad was kept as a branch line, and named the Spikkestad Line, while the section from Spikkestad to Brakerøya was removed.

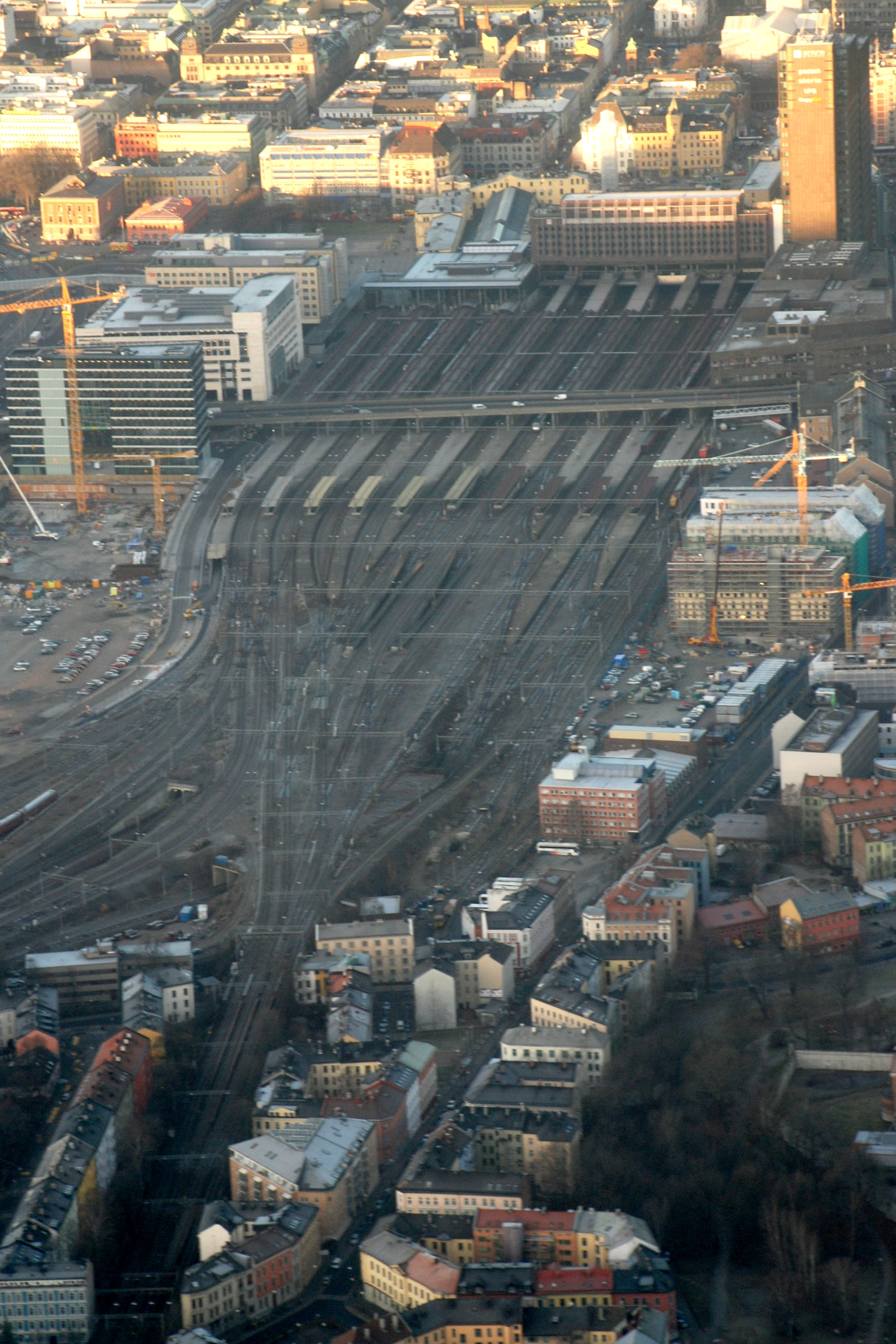
Oslo Central Station became the main hub for all commuter trains from 1989.

The Oslo Tunnel opened on 30 May 1980, connecting the Drammen Line to Oslo Ø. Initially, only the Lillestrøm– Drammen/Spikkestad lines used the tunnel, in addition to some services from Eidsvoll and Årnes to Skøyen. At the same time, Oslo Ø was rebuilt to the 19-platform Oslo S, which was put into service on 26 November 1986. Oslo V was closed on 27 May 1989.

In 1993, NSB received a large delivery of middle cars for the majority of the Class 69 units, allowing NSB to operate them as three-car trains. Between 1992 and 1996, a new, upgraded double track was put into service between Ski and Moss. The section is capable of speeds from 160 to 200 kilometres per hour (99 to 124 mph). The Gardermoen Line opened as Norway's first high-speed line on 8 October 1998. The line runs parallel to the Trunk Line from Oslo S to Eidsvoll, via Oslo Airport, Gardermoen—which opened the same day. The section from Oslo S to Lillestrøm, consisting mainly of the Romerike Tunnel, was delayed because of leaks in the tunnel, and opened on 22 August 1999. In 1997, NSB ordered 36 Class 72 multiple units to supplement and replace existing material. They were painted green and branded as part of the NSB Puls scheme, which was quickly abandoned. The four-car units were taken into service in 2002.

The ministry decided in the early 2000s to make the services on the Gjøvik Line subject to public service obligations, as a trial to privatize operation of all passenger train services in Norway. In the tender, NSB's subsidiary, NSB Anbud (since renamed NSB Gjøvikbanen) won the ten-year contract, after having underbid Veolia Transport Norge and DSB. Nine Class 69 trains were upgraded and designated 69G and will operate until 2015 on the Gjøvik Line. Because of a cabinet change in 2005, the PSO contracting was terminated. On 27 August 2005, the Asker Line opened between Sandvika and Asker, allowing trains to bypass the many local stations at 160 kilometres per hour (99 mph).

In 2011, the Asker Line from Lysaker to Sandvika, and a new Lysaker Station opened. This increased the capacity and regularity along the Drammen Line. The opening of four tracks at Lysaker will allow NSB to run all local trains that previously have run to Skøyen all the way to Lysaker. The closed Høvik Station will be used to turn trains. The Oslo Tunnel remains the bottleneck west of Oslo, so no more trains can run westwards, although more will be able to continue past Skøyen.

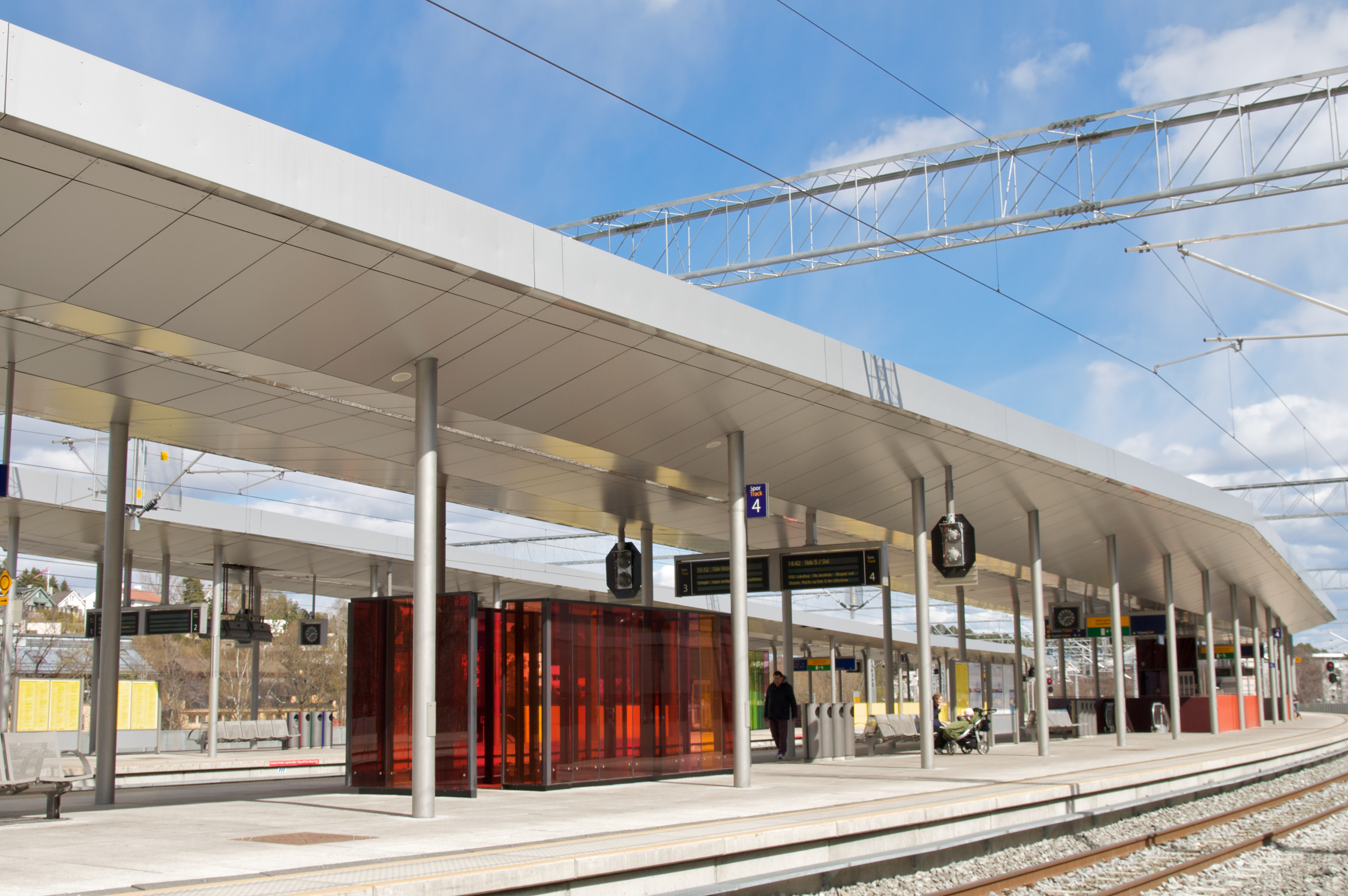
Lysaker Station is the eastern terminus of the Asker Line.

In 2008, NSB ordered 50 Stadler FLIRT multiple units, to be designated Class 74 and 75, and later 16 more Class 75. 42 of these, class 75, have a commuter train configuration. NSB holds an option for an additional 84 units. The trains have a maximum speed of 200 kilometers per hour (120 mph) and a faster acceleration than the older classes. The combination of the Asker Line and more rolling stock allows NSB to operate a more aggressive service after a major restructuring of the lines in 2012. In particular, there are between five and seven-minute headway on the sections between Asker and Lillestrøm, and a twenty-minute headway to Oslo Airport and Eidsvoll.

In December 2022, the Follo Line was opened. It is a 22.5-kilometer (14.0 mi) long line, is built nearly entirely in a single tunnel, and will connect Oslo Central Station directly with Ski and will allow speeds at 200 kilometers per hour (120 mph). It will allow higher speeds and capacity southwards for the lines to Moss and Rakkestad, as well as regional trains to Østfold and Sweden. The line was scheduled for completion in 2022.

At this time, December 2022, several of the local lines which went farther from Oslo and typically with departures once per hour, were redefined as regional trains and got a letter R instead of L in their name. The line previously called regional trains were renamed to regional express, from R to RE first in their names. These lines go well over 100 km from Oslo to Lillehammer, Skien and Halden.

== Future ==
Parliament has passed the Ringerike Line, which would run from Sandvika to Hønefoss Station on the Bergen Line. While mainly proposed as a shortening of the Bergen Line, the line would double up as a commuter train line, allowing Hønefoss and Ringerike significantly faster public transport to the capital area. The line would be 40 kilometers (25 mi) long and allow speeds of 200 kilometers per hour (120 mph). However, no financing has been secured for the project.

In 2021, the government planned to procure a train operator for around half of the commuter and regional rail around Oslo, and in 2023 an operator for the other half, instead of having NSB/Vy to operate the traffic by definition. In 2019–20 long-distance traffic and local traffic around west coast cities in Norway were procured in a similar way. This is delayed, and the national company Vy was selected for continued monopoly for a new period.
