= NSB Class 69 =

Norwegian passenger train

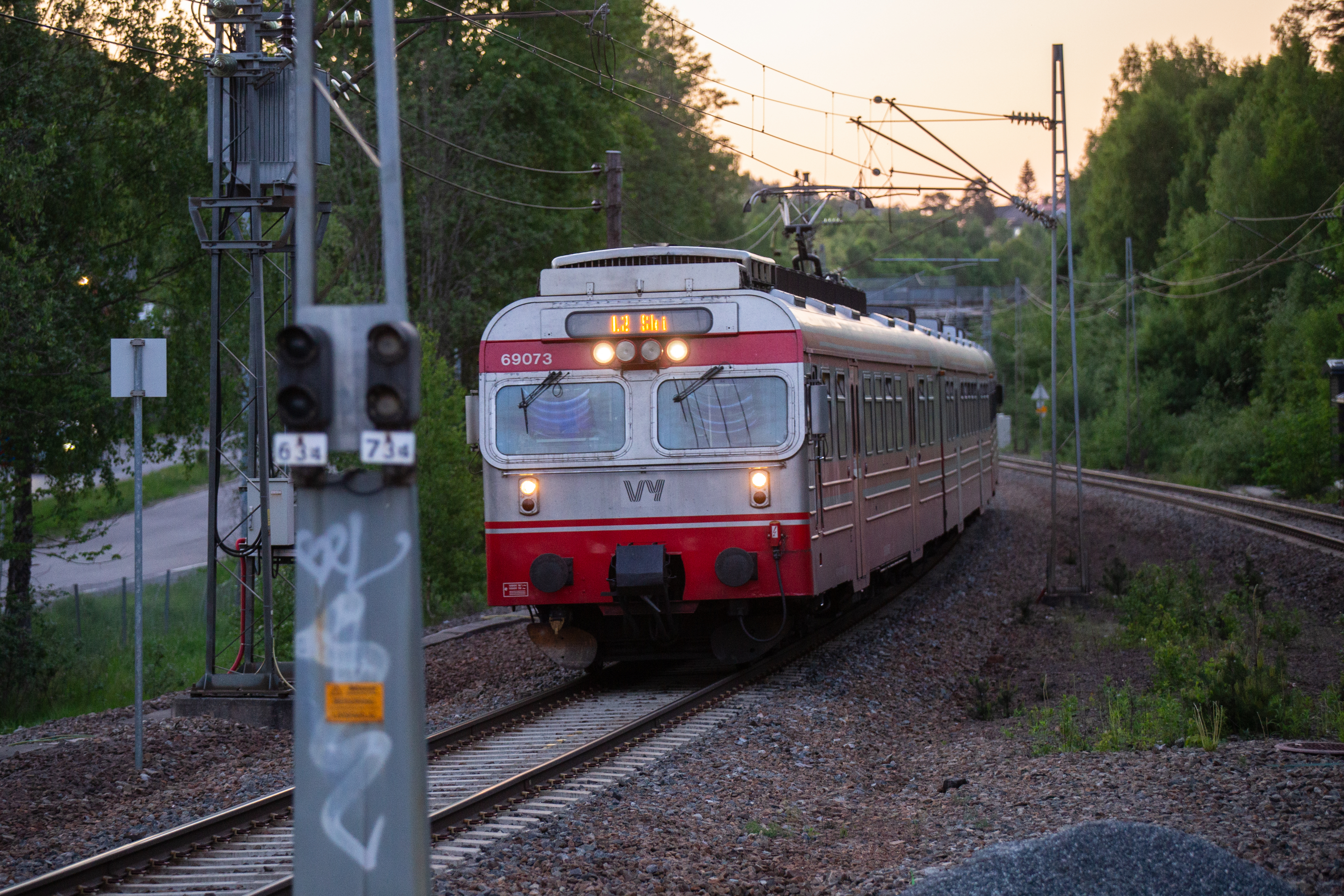
- 69073 at Holmlia Station
- Stock type: Electric multiple unit
- In service: 1971 – present
- Manufacturer: Strømmen ASEA
- Refurbished: 2005 (G-series)
- Number built: 85 units
- Formation: 2 or 3 cars
- Capacity: 189 seats (A-series); 282–306 (3 car 2-series); 180–204 (3 car B-series); 301 (C-series); 300–303 (D-series); 178 (E-series); 270 (G-series)
- Operators: Go-Ahead Norge; Vy
- Lines served: L2 (Drammen and Østfold Line); R50 (Arendal Line); R55 (Bratsberg Line)

Specifications
- Car length: End cars: 24.85 m (81 ft 6.3 in) (A, B, C); 25.06 m (82 ft 2.6 in) (D, E, G); Centre cars: 24.25 m (79 ft 6.7 in) (B); 27 m (88 ft 7.0 in) (C, D, E, G)
- Maximum speed: 130 km/h (81 mph)
- Weight: Motor car: 53.9 t (53.0 long tons; 59.4 short tons) (A-series); 54 t (B-series); 53.5 t (52.7 long tons; 59.0 short tons) (C-series); 60.5 t (59.5 long tons; 66.7 short tons) (D-series); 64 t (63 long tons; 71 short tons) (E-series); Centre cars: 28.8 t (28.3 long tons; 31.7 short tons) (B-series); 35 t (34 long tons; 39 short tons) (C-, D-series); 38 t (37 long tons; 42 short tons) (E-series); Steering cars: 29 t (29 long tons; 32 short tons) (A-, C-series); 28.5 t (28.0 long tons; 31.4 short tons) (B-series); 35.5 t (34.9 long tons; 39.1 short tons) (D-series); 37 t (36 long tons; 41 short tons) (E-series)
- Power output: 1,632 hp (1,217 kW)
- Electric system: 15 kV 16.7 Hz AC Catenary
- Current collection: Pantograph
- Track gauge: 1,435 mm (4 ft 8 1/2 in)

NSB Class 69 (Norwegian: NSB type 69) is an electric multiple unit used by Norwegian State Railways for a variety of commuter trains on the Norwegian railway system, as well as a few medium distance and branch line trains. It is the most common type of trainset in Norway, although the newer NSB Class 72 has also been introduced. All the trains were built by Strømmen.

== History ==
During the 1960s NSB realized that they would need a new generation of electric multiple units for local traffic. Both the Class 65, 67 and 68 had for thirty years been built with slight modifications, and NSB needed both new and more modern trains for their operations. Among the inspiration was the successful X1 units used in Sweden. NSB decided on a number of rationalizations, first of all a new interior so that two new cars could hold the same capacity as three units from the older models. Secondly NSB wanted quicker trains, and increased the maximum speed from 70 to 130 km/h (43 to 81 mph). This increase in speed was sufficient to reduce the number of trains for a given frequency by a third. For instance on the line from Oslo East Station to Ski this allowed NSB to reduce the number of operative car from nine to four. The 69-set was also given new thyristor motors with 1,200 kW, a lot more than the old units.

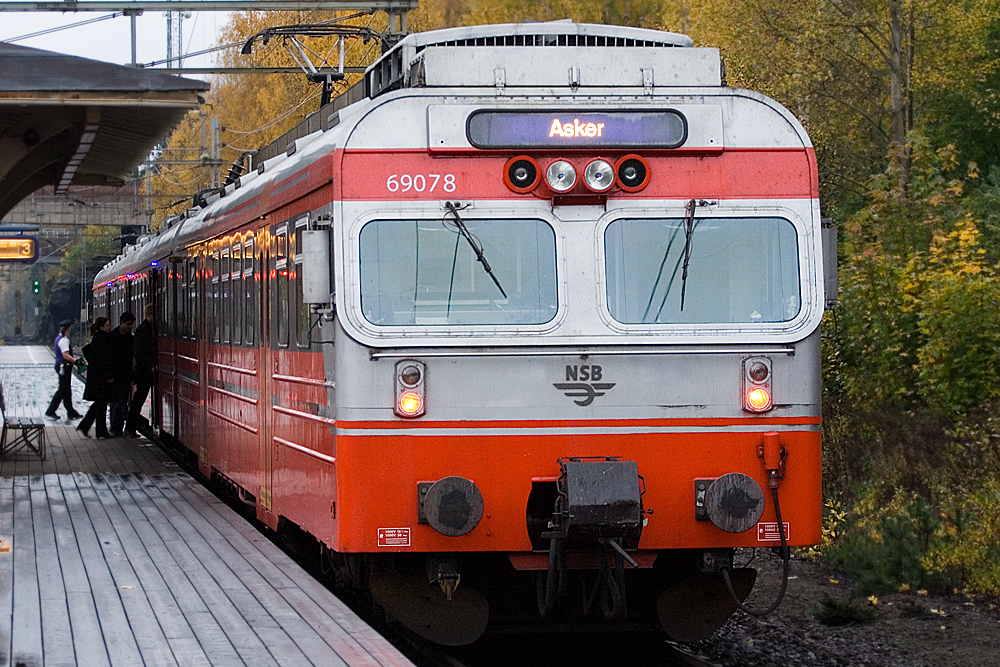
BM69078 (D-series) with the new design at Lørenskog Station

The first units were delivered on 1 November 1970, and the first series fifteen units (A-series) was put into service from Oslo Ø to Lillestrøm and Ski. The B-series was delivered a few years later, and used for longer lines, soon followed by more C-series units. The D-series was delivered in the 1980s and custom made for longer distances. The last series was delivered in 1993 as part of the stock for the 1994 Winter Olympics. All the original units consisted of twin-car sets, but from 1987 NSB ordered additional middle cars, to make three-car units. This allowed somewhat more flexibility, and NSB kept the A- and B-series as twin-cars so they could combine trains to make any number of cars needed between two and nine. The second two batches of D-series trains delivered in 1990 and 1993 were delivered with three cars.

Not until 1982 were the 69-units put into service outside the Oslo area. At first they were tried out on Flåm Line, then in 1984 on the Bergen Commuter Rail. From 1991 they were also used on the Stavanger Commuter Rail.

The E- and G-series are rebuilt sets, with higher comfort levels, the former in 1994 for Sørlandet Line between Kristiansand and Stavanger, the latter on Gjøvik Line in 2005.

On 14 December 1999 NSB introduced wrap advertising for Freia Melkesjokolade on three of the trains, but chose to discontinue outside advertisements after a while.

Two will be operated by Go-Ahead Norge from December 2019.

== Lines served ==
The Class 69 trainsets are in use between Arendal-Nelaug, Notodden-Porsgrunn and on the L2 line between Stabekk–Ski, they have recently been used sometimes on the L1 line between Lillestrøm-Asker.

== Versions ==
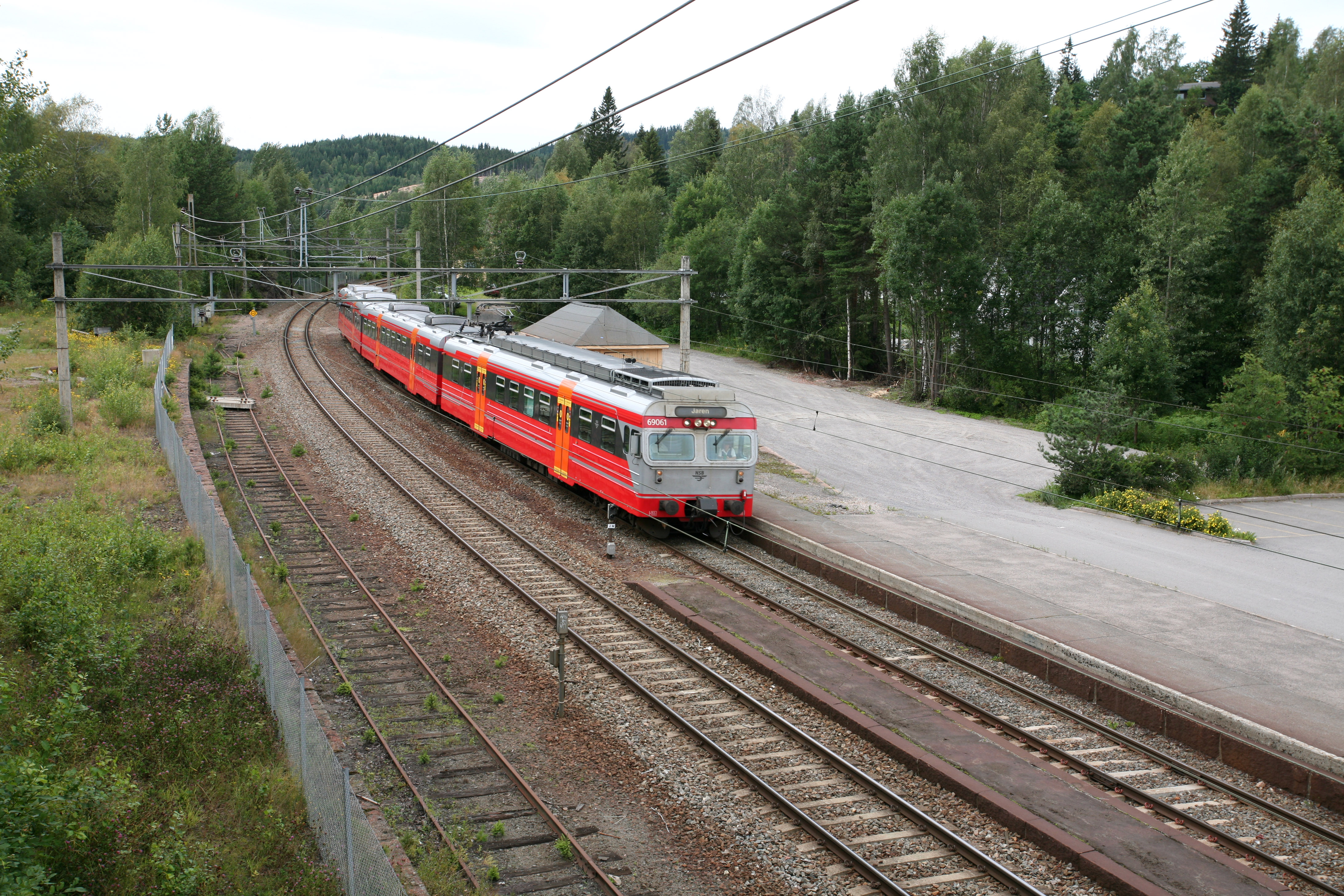
NSB Gjøvikbanen G-unit at Nittedal Station

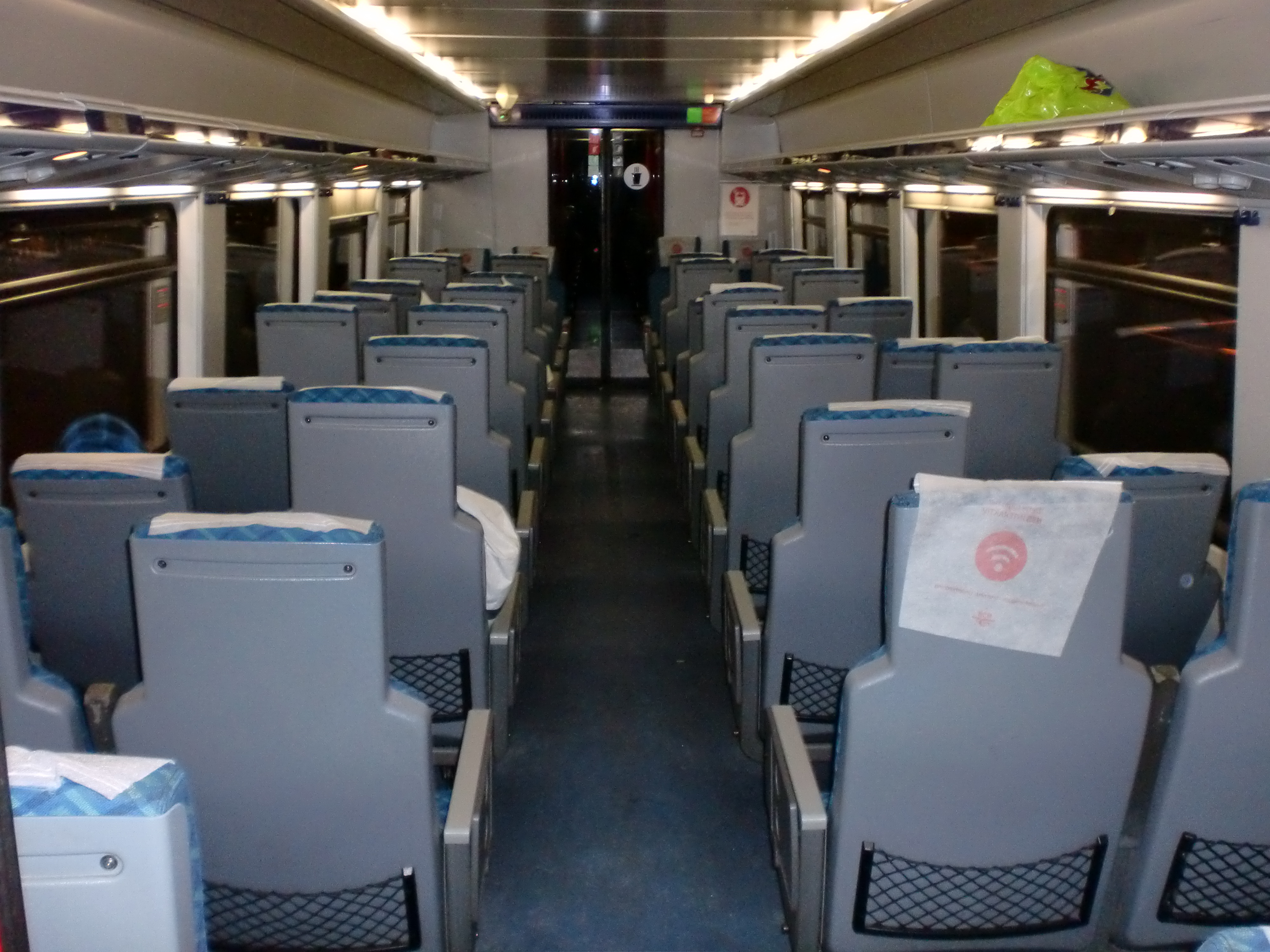
Interior of B70 825–832.

Class 69 comes in seven series:

- The 69A was the original Class 69, built between 1970 and 1971. They consist of two carriages. 15 of these train sets were built.
- The 69B is the second series, built in 1974. Most of the 17 69B sets built consist of two carriages, but two of them had a middle carriage added. Some of the B-series trains were rebuilt with a large cargo hold, making them suitable for somewhat longer journeys such as Bergen–Myrdal where skis and bicycles are often brought along. The B-series has only one door on each side of the carriage, rather than two. This allows for extra seating, although it slows the embarkment and disembarkment.
- The 69C series was built in 1975. They consist of three carriages. The 14 train sets operate commuter trains like the 69D series.
- The 69D series were built between 1983 and 1990. They are distinguishable from the 69C series by the redesigned ends of the train. 39 of these trains were built.
- The 69E series are redesigned 69D trains for use on somewhat longer stretches, for instance, the usual five abreast seating is replaced with four abreast seating. They have been used on the Gjøvik Line, Jæren Line, Bergen Line, and Voss Line.
- The 69G series are another version of redesigned 69D train sets. They are equipped with several amenities such as food and drink vending machines and more comfortable seating including a first class section. The nine G-series trains were rebuilt in Denmark and did operate on the Gjøvik Line. Two such trains are since 2020 used on the Ofoten Line as tourist trains, the other on the Bratsberg Line and Arendal Line.
- The 69H series are a third version of redesigned 69D train sets. They are retrofitted with four abreast seating in the centre and steering cars.

== Specifications ==
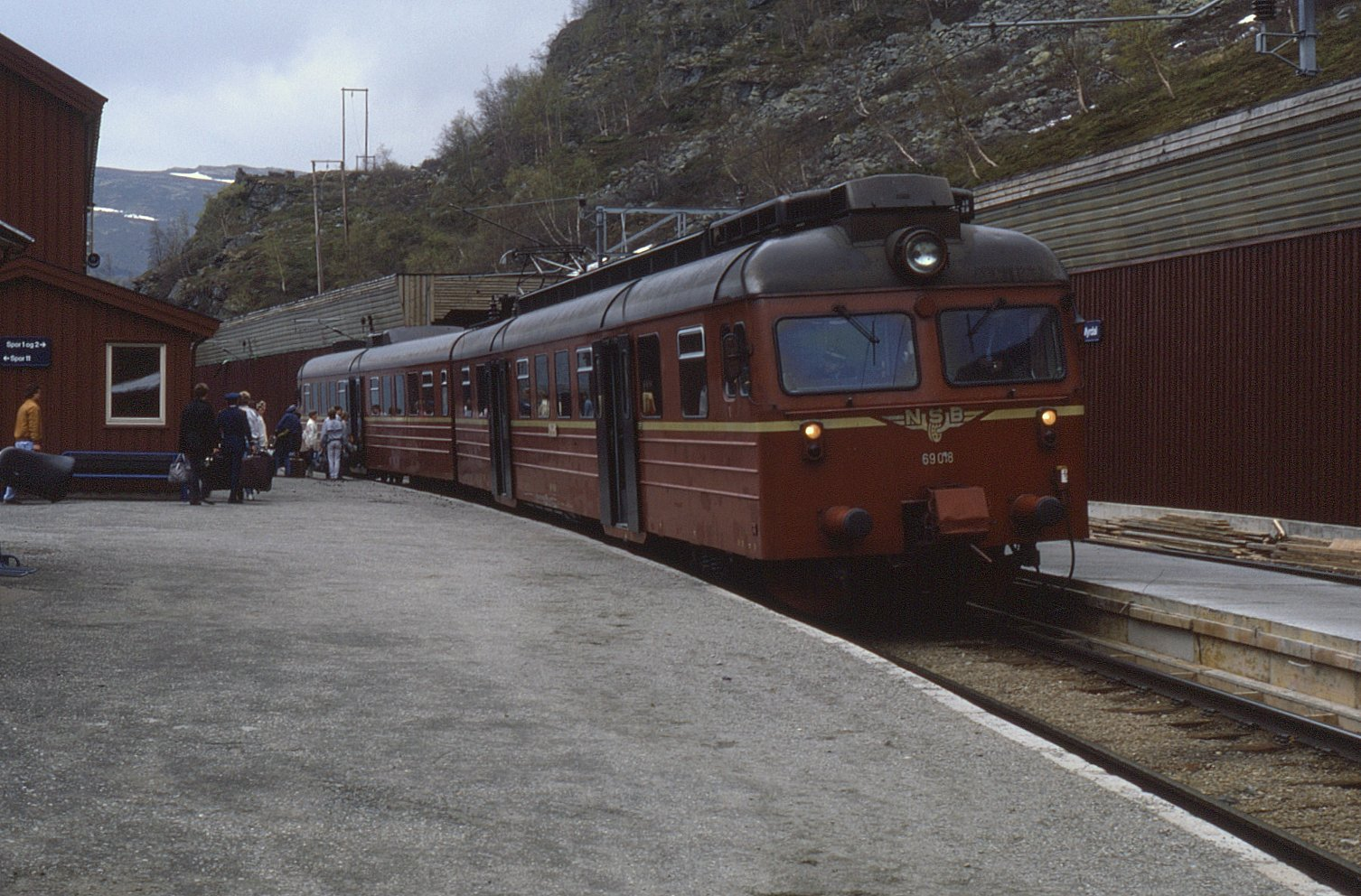
NSB 69.018 at Myrdal Station in 1986

- Weight: 53.5-64 tons
- Power: 1632 hp
- Axle configuration
  - Bo'Bo'+2'2' (2 cars)
  - Bo'Bo'+2'2'+2'2' (3 cars)
- Maximum speed: 130 km/h

== Accidents ==
- On 20 June 1986, 69.054 burnt up at Lodalen.
- On 26 October 1988, 69.668 collided with El 16.2205 and was later demolished.
- On 16 April 1990, two 69-sets collided at Lysaker, and 69.009 and 69.628 were taken out of service.
- In 1991 and 1992, 69.014 and 69.019, respectively, burnt up.
- After the Nordstrand accident in 1993, 69.068 was retired.

== Others taken out of service ==
No.01, 02(ERTMS test train), 04, 06, 07, 08, 09, 10, 13, 15, 17, 18, 20, 21, 22, 23, 25, 30, 31, 32, 41
