= NSB Class 62 =

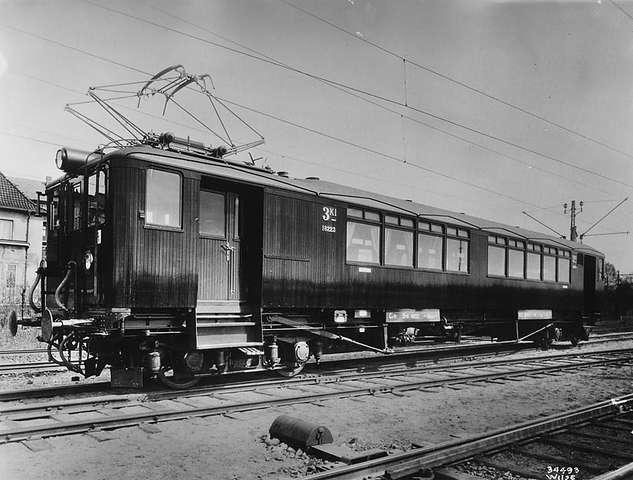
- Class 62 in 1926 at Skillebekk

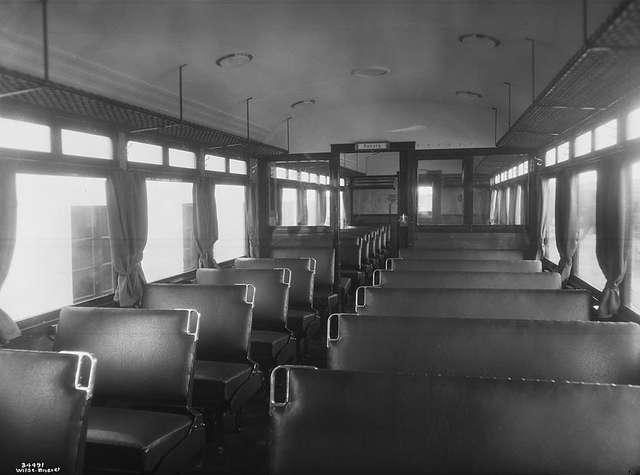
- Interior of class 62
- In service: 1931–1970
- Manufacturer: NEBB and Skabo
- Constructed: 1931–1933
- Number built: 4
- Capacity: 73
- Operators: Norwegian State Railways

Specifications
- Car length: 20,600 mm (67 ft 7 in)
- Maximum speed: 70 km/h (43 mph)
- Weight: 43.2 t (42.5 long tons; 47.6 short tons)
- Traction system: 4 x NEBB EDTM 384
- Power output: 344 kW (461 hp)
- Electric system(s): 15 kV 16.7 Hz AC Catenary
- Current collector(s): Pantograph
- Track gauge: 1,435 mm (4 ft 8 1/2 in)

NSB Class 62 is the first electric railcar operated by the Norwegian State Railways, between 1936 and 1970. Four units were built by Skabo and Norsk Elektrisk & Brown Boveri in 1931–35, with unit has been preserved by the Norwegian Railway Museum.

The units served, along with trailer cars on the first mainline electrified railway, the Drammen Line. Two were delivered in 1931; two more in 1933. They proved to be underpowered, and were not used on the most heavily trafficked part of the line; mostly serving on trains to Asker or Heggedal. 62.02 was involved in an explosion at Filipstad on 13 December 1943 and retired. The units were not compatible with the newer NSB BM65 units delivered from 1936, and were dispatched to Ofotbanen in 1952 where they served until 1970, except for 62.01 that was transferred to Kristiansand to be used on local trains on the Sørland Line, remaining in service until 1965.
