= NSB El 8 =

Norwegian electric locomotive

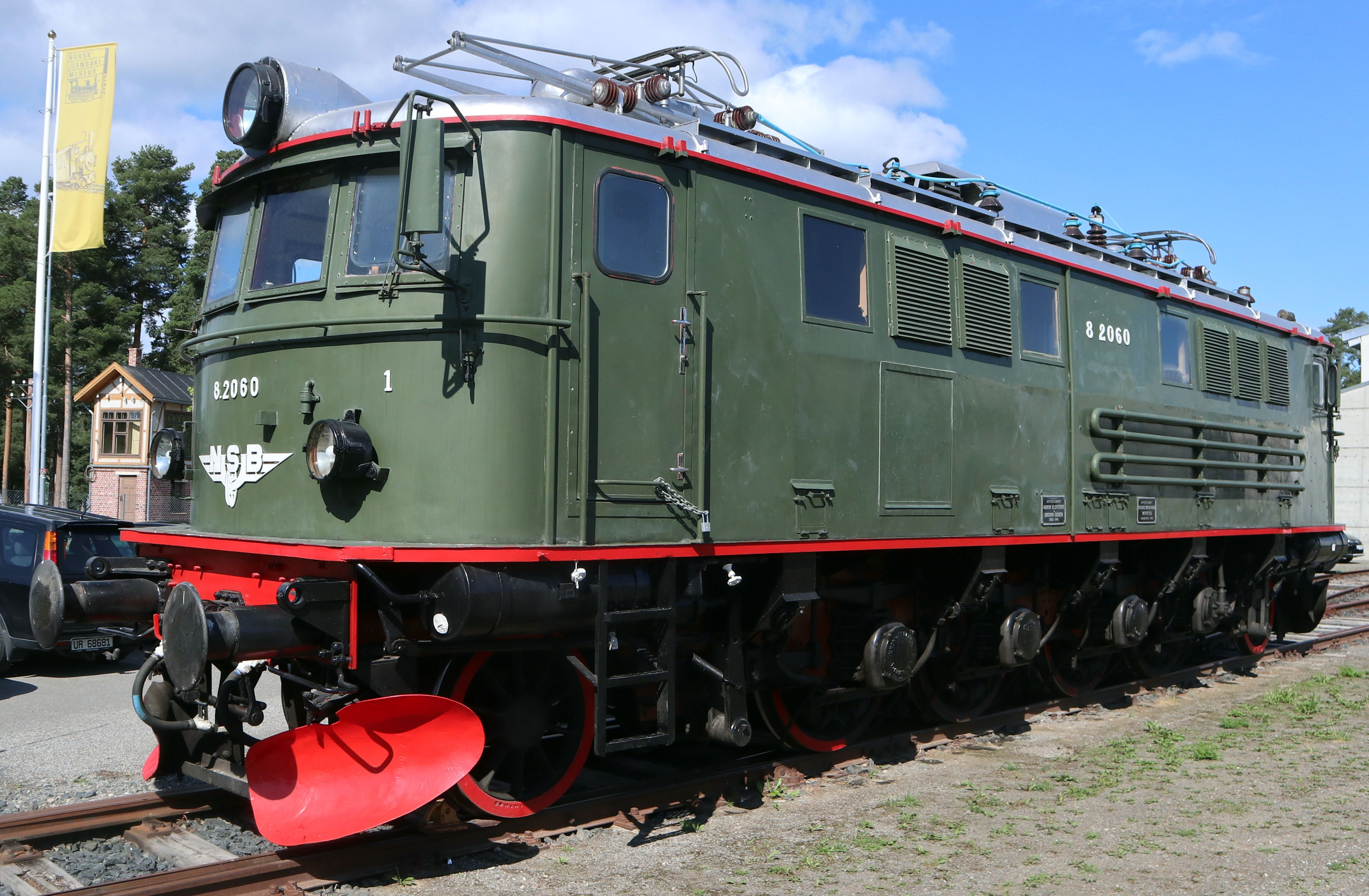
- El 8.2060, Hamar, 2023-7-18
Type and origin
- Power type: Electric
- Builder: Norsk Elektrisk & Brown Boveri; AEG; Thune; Per Kure
- Build date: 1940-1949
- Total produced: 16
Specifications
- Configuration
  - AAR: 1-D-1
  - UIC: 1'Do1'
- Gauge: 1,435 mm (4 ft 8 1/2 in) standard gauge
- Length: 13.8 m (45 ft 3 in)
- Loco weight: 82.8 t (81.5 long tons; 91.3 short tons)
- Electric system/s: 15 kV 16 2/3 Hz AC Catenary
- Current pickup: Pantograph
Performance figures
- Maximum speed: 110 km/h (68 mph)
- Power output: 2,080 kW (2,789 hp)
- Tractive effort: 135 kN (30,000 lbf)
Career
- Operators: Norwegian State Railways
- Numbers: 8 2054 to 8 2061; 8 2065 to 8 2072
- Locale: Norway
- Retired: 1987
- Disposition: Retired

The NSB El 8 was a Norwegian electric locomotive which was built between 1940 and 1949. Although fast, the El 8 did not have bogies, making it rather stiff in the turns, a problem which was remedied with the introduction of the NSB El 11 and NSB El 13.

There were 16 El 8 engines produced. Four manufacturers were involved in building it: AEG, Norsk Elektrisk & Brown Boveri, Per Kure and Thune. The engines were numbered 8 2054 to 8 2061 and 8 2065 to 8 2072. The last El 8 was retired in 1987. Engine no. 8 2060 is preserved.

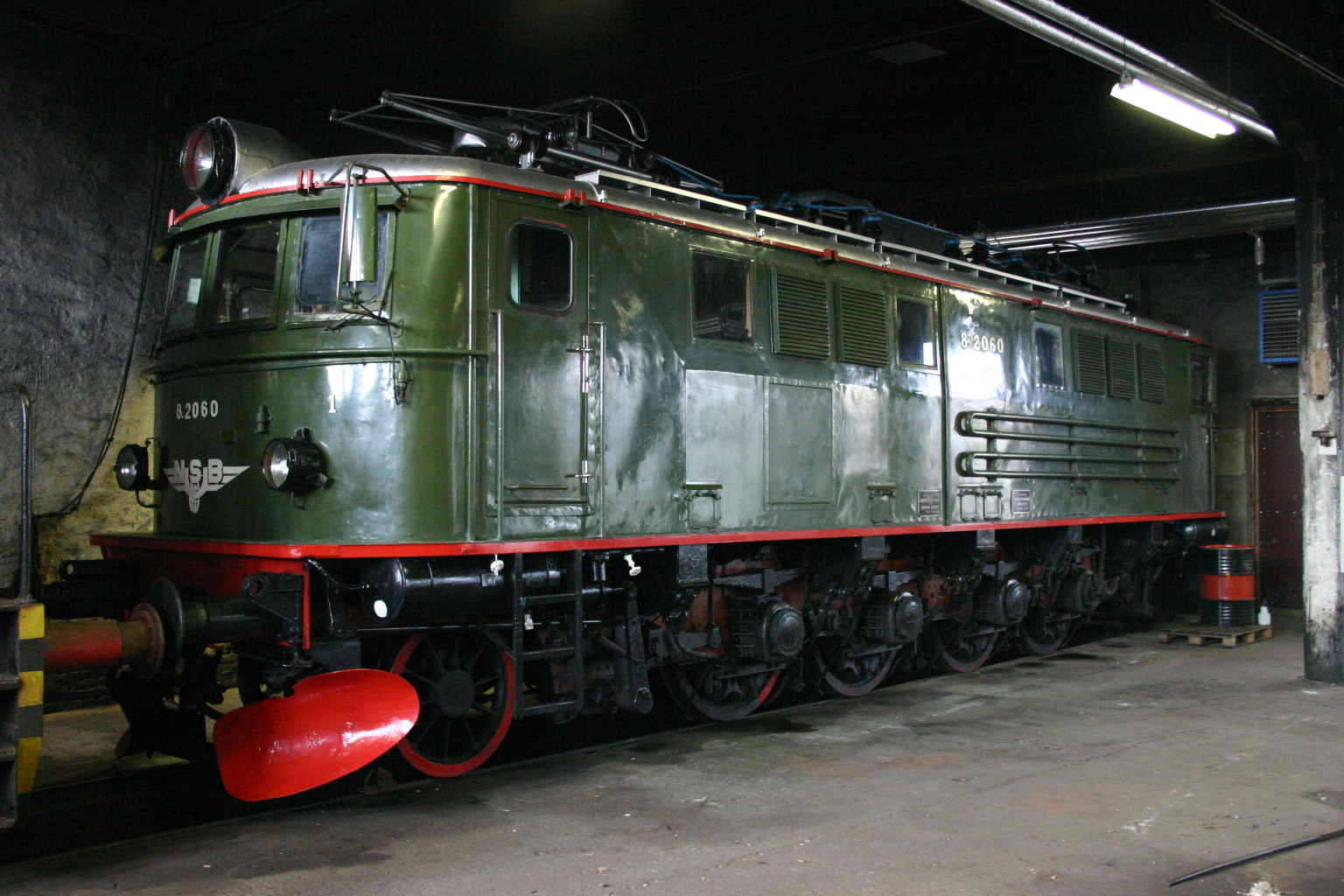
El 8.2060 Hamar 2004-08-02, left side

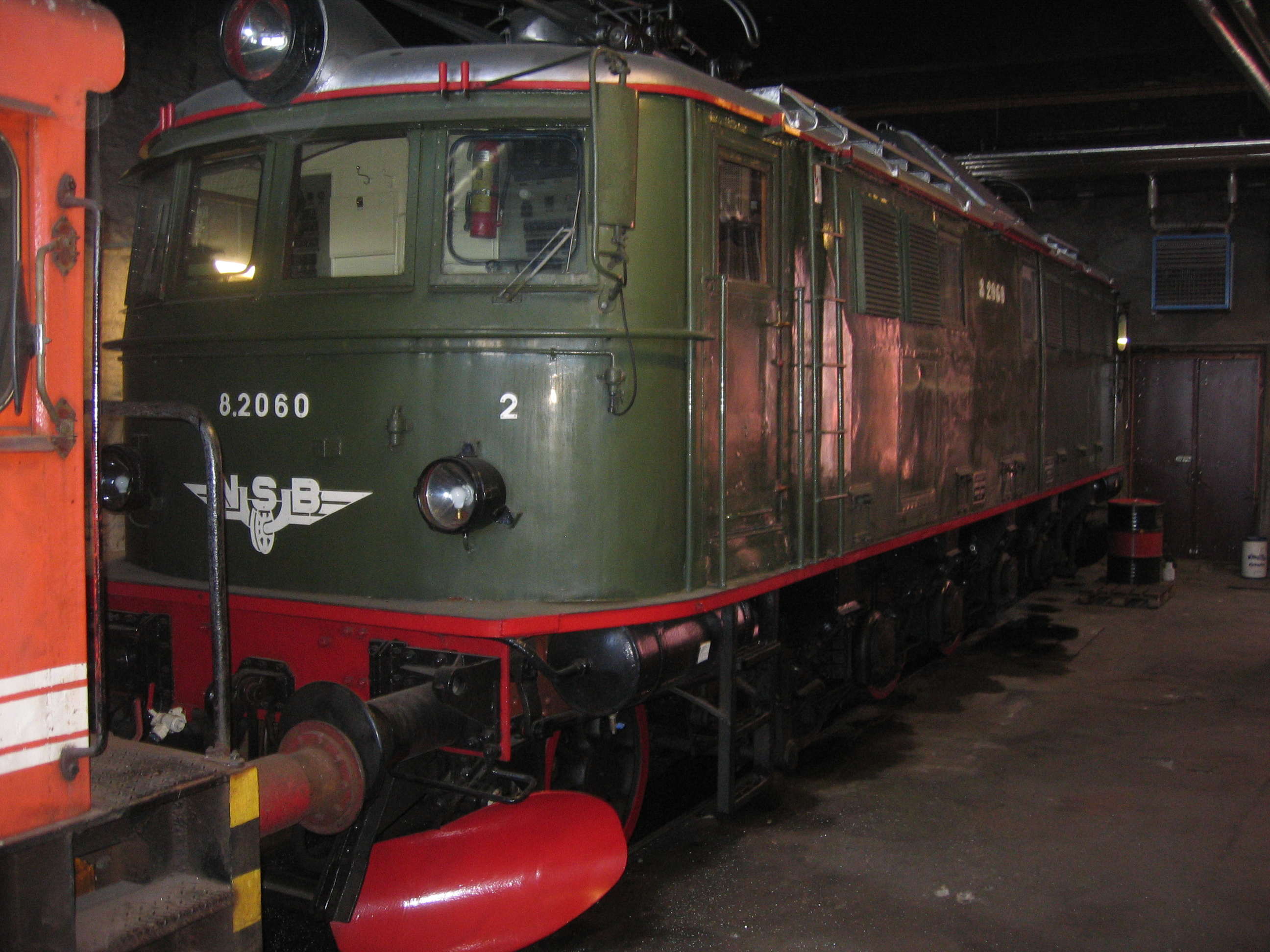
El 8.2060 Hamar 2007-07-21, right side
