= TS Class 1 =

Class of Norwegian trams

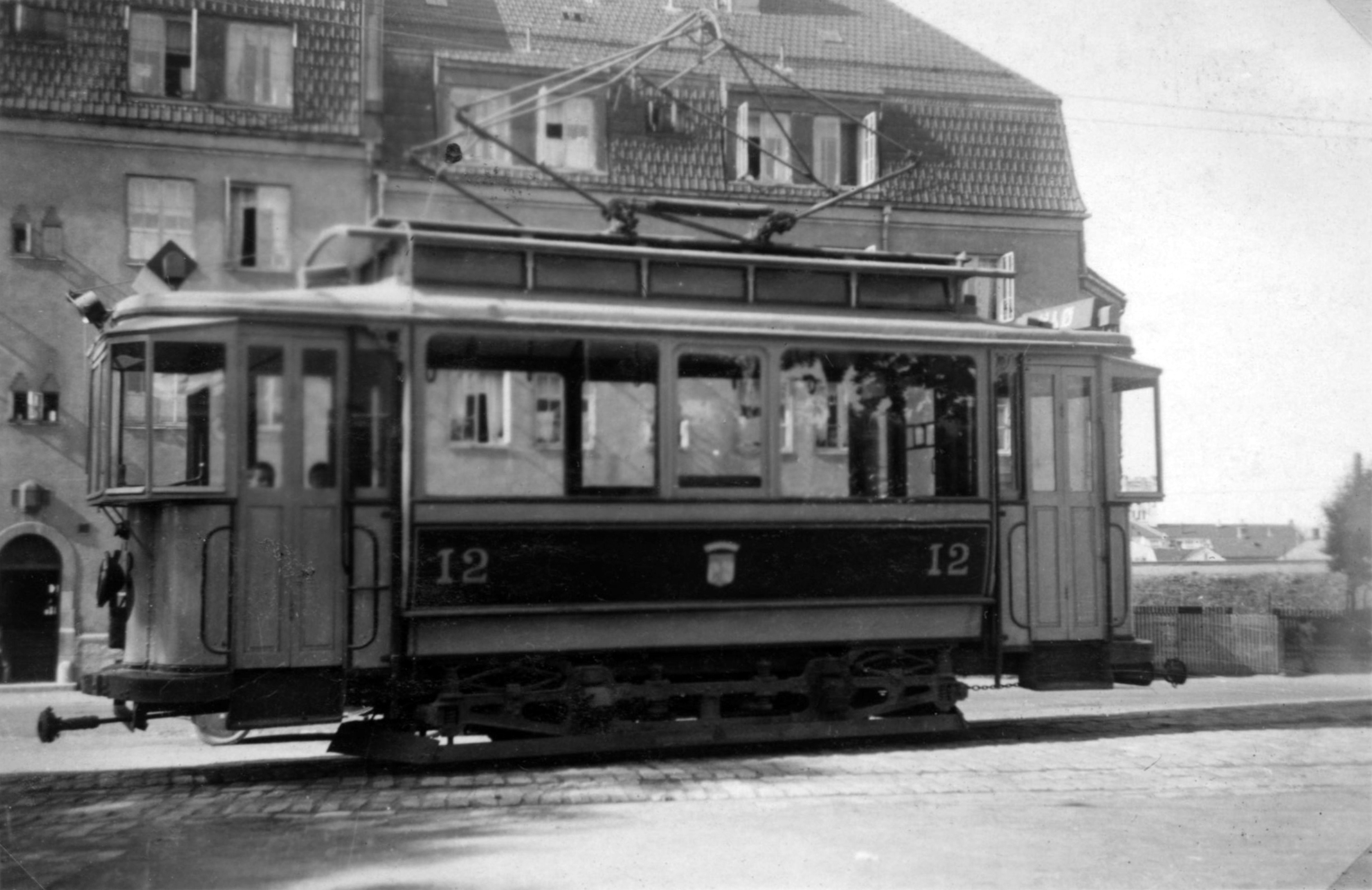

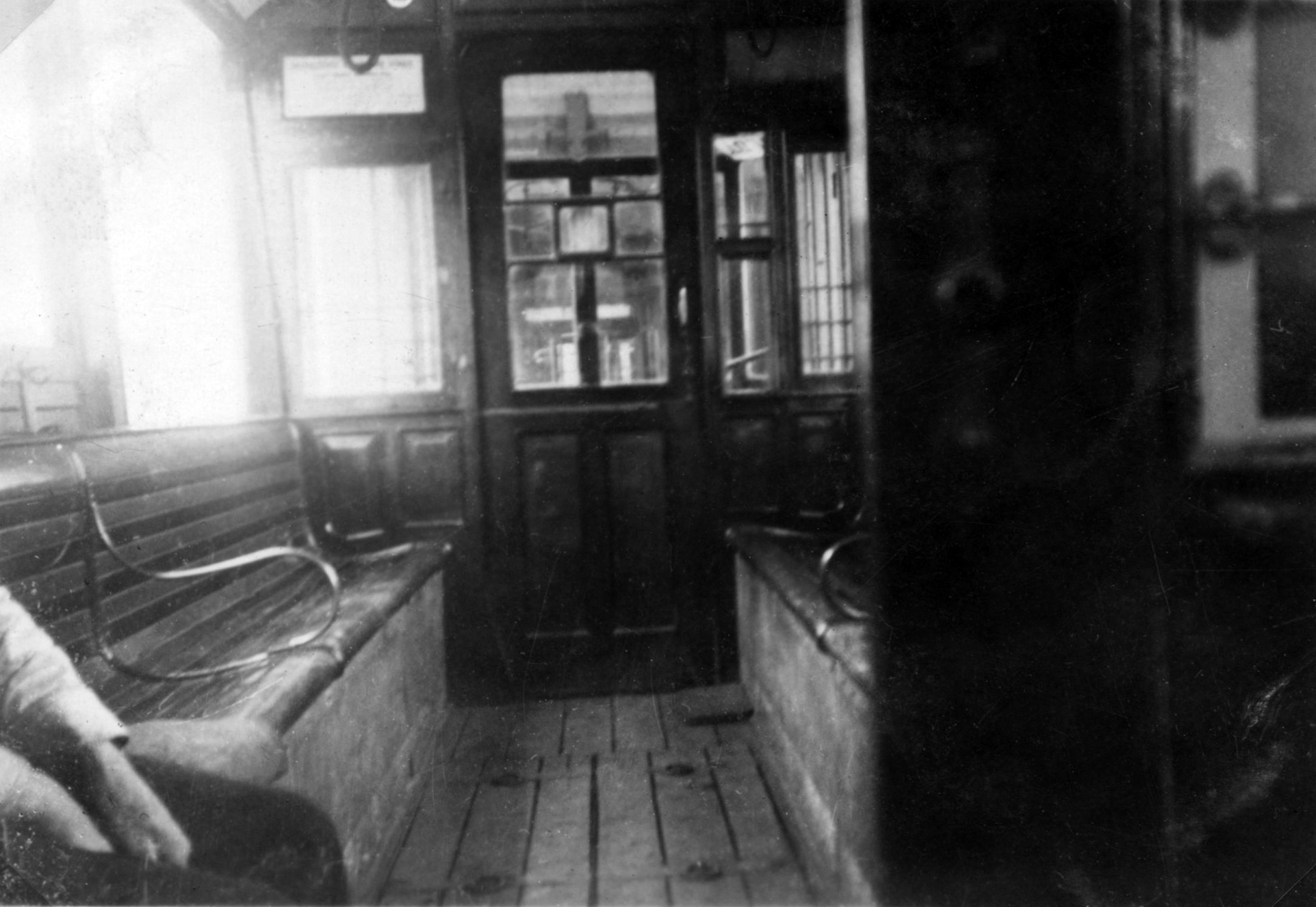
- Manufacturer: HaWa/Skabo
- Constructed: 1901–03
- Entered service: 1901
- Scrapped: 1947–56
- Number built: 12 (trams); 4 (trailes)
- Number preserved: 1
- Fleet numbers: 1–12 (trams); 20–24 (trailers)
- Operators: Trondheim Sporvei

Specifications
- Car body construction: Wood
- Car length: 7.4 m (24 ft 3 in)
- Width: 2.0 m (6 ft 7 in)
- Doors: 4
- Weight: 7.4 t (7.3 long tons; 8.2 short tons)
- Prime mover(s): Siemens D14 / D20
- Power output: 30 kW (40 hp)
- Electric system(s): 600 V DC
- Current collection: Pantograph
- Track gauge: 1,000 mm (3 ft 3 3/8 in)

TS Class 1 was a series of twelve trams built by Hannoversche Waggonfabrik for Trondheim Sporvei. Eleven trams were delivered for the opening of the Trondheim Tramway in 1901, while a single tram built by was delivered in 1903. These were numbered 1–12. In 1904, four unpowered trailers were delivered by HaWa and numbered 20–24.

Each of the two Siemens motors had a power of 15 kW (20 hp). They had a single compartment, with outdoor platforms at each end. They made up part of the old 2.0 m (6 ft 7 in) wide trams, with benches along the length of the cars. In 1916, one tram was rebuilt to a trailer, followed by five more in 1922 and another five in 1930. One tram was converted to a welding vehicle in 1922, while the last tram was kept as a heritage tram, and is still preserved at Trondheim Tramway Museum. As trailers, the trams were renumbered 50 and 55–63. All the trailers were scrapped in 1947–56.
