= Per Kure (company) =

- Industry: Electrical appliances
- Founded: 1897; 128 years ago in Hasle in Oslo, Norway
- Founder: Per Kure
- Defunct: 1988
- Fate: Merged with Asea Brown Boveri
- Headquarters: Norway

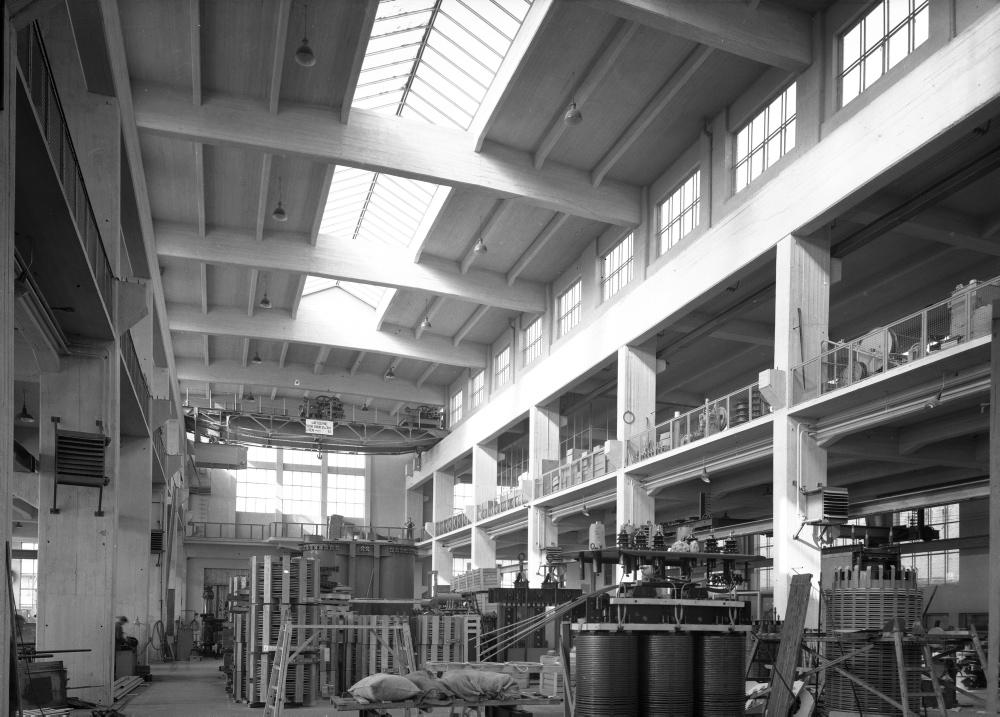
Interior photo of A/S Per Kure Norsk Motor

A/S Per Kure, variously also known as A/S Per Kure Norsk Motor- og Dynamofabrikk and ASEA–Per Kure, was a manufacturer first of electric heaters and later of transformers. Founded by Per Kure in 1897, it was for most of its history based at Hasle in Oslo, Norway. The company was dissolved during the creation of Asea Brown Boveri in 1988.

== History ==
Per Kure, born in 1872, returned to Norway in 1897 after receiving an education in electronics in Mittweida, Germany. He established the company that bore his name on 28 September. The company started working with installation of electrical apparatuses, including lights and motors. Originally located in the street Kristian Augusts gate, the company moved to Universitetsgata 24 in 1905. The company was importer of Elektra, a Swiss brand of electrical heaters, and from 1911, the company received a license to produce the products for Norway and Sweden.

In 1912, the company started selling products from Nya Förenade Elektriska Aktiebolaget of Sweden in Norway. After it had merged to create Allmänna Svenska Elektriska Aktiebolaget (ASEA), Per Kure took over ASEA's Norwegian division, Norsk Motor- og Dynamofabrik, and the new company was renamed A/S Per Kure Norsk Motor- og Dynamofabrik. The merged company produced transformers, which were largely sold for production of hydroelectricity in Norway. In 1937, all of the company's manufacturing was localized at Hasle. Per Kure remained CEO until 1938, by which time the company had 500 employees. Per Kure built transformers two classes of Norwegian electric locomotives, El 5 and El 9.

In 1944, during the Second World War, the Norwegian resistance movement was active with sabotage against companies which were supplying the German armed forces. Workers at Per Kure had joined the communist resistance group Osvald. Because of the Allied bombing of Germany, Per Kure was thought to become part of a decentralized production facility for assembly of aircraft engines, and Osvald considered the plant a legitimate target. On 30 May 1944, the entire plant at Hasle was blown up and several transformers severely damaged. The action was not coordinated with central parts of the resistance, such as Milorg, which had a more passive strategy.

In 1945, Per Kure died, and ASEA bought the company and renamed ASEA–Per Kure. In 1967, the production of Elektra products was sold. The company remained until 1988, when ASEA merged to become ABB. In 1988, ASEA–Per Kure was dissolved and the following year, production of transformers at Hasle ceased.
