= Per Kure =

Norwegian businessman

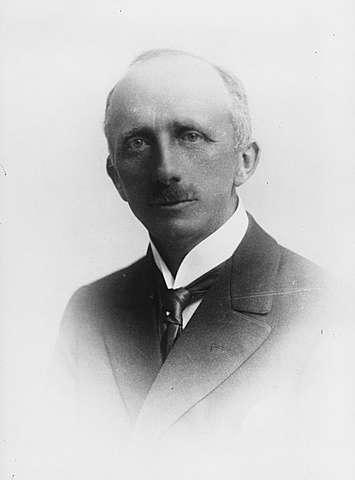
- Per Kure in 1924
- Born: 28 September 1872; Moss in Østfold, Norway
- Died: 8 March 1945 (aged 72); Oslo, Norway
- Occupations: Electrical Engineer; Businessperson

Per Kure (28 September 1872 – 8 March 1945) was an electrical engineer and businessman. He was the founder of the firm A/S Per Kure.

Per Kure was born at Moss in Østfold, Norway. Kure grew up in a merchant's family. He studied engineering, first at Horten Technical School (Horten tekniske skole) and then at Hochschule Mittweida in Saxony (1894–97). He established the company A/S Per Kure in 1897 initially as a retailer of electrical apparatuses, including lights and motors. From 1911, the company started selling such product as engines, generators and dynamos. In 1916, the company merged with Norske Motor- og Dynamofabrikk, the Norwegian subsidiary of Swedish based ASEA (Allmänna Svenska Elektriska Aktiebolaget). Kure continued as director of the new company. He resigned in 1938 as CEO of the enterprise. In 1945, ASEA bought the company which was renamed ASEA–Per Kure.

Kure was leader of the Federation of Norwegian Manufacturing Industries. He was chairman of Teknologibedriftenes Landsforening (1920–22) and Norsk Elektroteknisk Forening (1924–29) and later chairman of the Norwegian Museum of Science and Technology.

== Related reading ==
- Glete, Jan (1987) ASEA under hundra år: 1883-1983: en studie i ett storföretags organisatoriska, tekniska och ekonomiska utveckling (Västerås: Asea) ISBN 9172607645
- Aspenberg, Nils Carl (2001) Elektrolok i Norge (Oslo: Baneforlaget) ISBN 82-91448-42-6
