= NSB Class 65 =

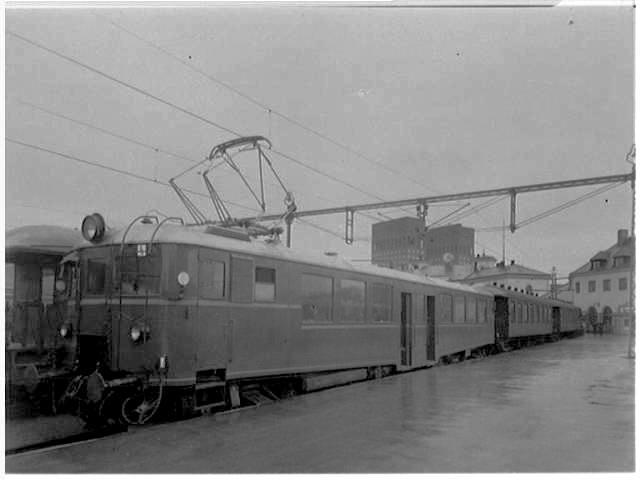
- Class 65a in 1939 at Oslo
- In service: 1936–1985
- Manufacturer: Norsk Elektrisk & Brown Boveri, Skabo and Strømmen
- Constructed: 1935–1951
- Number built: 49 units
- Formation: 3 cars
- Operators: Norwegian State Railways

Specifications
- Car length: Motor cars: 20.92 m (68 ft 8 in); Centre cars: 20.92 m (68 ft 8 in); End cars: 21.08 m (69 ft 2 in)
- Maximum speed: 70 km/h (43 mph)
- Weight: Motor cars: 46.7–47.0 tonnes (46.0–46.3 long tons; 51.5–51.8 short tons); Centre cars: 27.2–28.5 tonnes (26.8–28.0 long tons; 30.0–31.4 short tons); End cars: 29.5–30.5 tonnes (29.0–30.0 long tons; 32.5–33.6 short tons)
- Traction system: 4 x NEBB EDTM 384
- Power output: 464 kW (622 hp)
- Electric system(s): 15 kV 16.7 Hz AC Catenary
- Current collection: Pantograph
- Track gauge: 1,435 mm (4 ft 8 1/2 in)

NSB Class 65 (Norwegian: NSB type 65) was a three-car electric multiple unit operated by the Norwegian State Railways between 1936 and 1985. It was mainly used for local trains as well as branch lines. A total of 49 units were delivered between 1936 and 1949. The motor cars were built by Norsk Elektrisk & Brown Boveri and Skabo while the centre and end cars were built by Strømmen.

There are three series of Class 65. The A-series is rebuilt passenger carriages in wood totaling 10 units. The B-series consists of 13 steel units built in 1942 while a total of 22 C-series units were delivered 1949-51. Type 65 was quite successful and both Class 67 and Class 68 are based on it.

Units have been preserved by the Norwegian Railway Association, NBVJ in Nora, Freunde des Schienenverkehrs Flensburg, Minden Museum Railway and Colne Valley Railway.
