= Skabo Jernbanevognfabrikk =

Norwegian railroad car manufacturer

Skabo Jernbanevognfabrikk A/S
- Company type: Private
- Industry: Manufacturing
- Founded: 1864
- Defunct: 1959
- Fate: Merger
- Successor: Strømmens Værksted
- Headquarters: Oslo, Norway
- Products: Rail cars

Skabo Jernbanevognfabrikk was a mechanical workshop focusing on design and construction of railcars. It was established by Hans Skabo in Drammen, Norway, in 1864; it became the first rail car factory in the country when it took delivery of the cars for Kongsvingerbanen. Due to the size of the venture, it moved to Tyskerstranden at Skøyen in Kristiania (now Oslo) in 1873.

Because the delivery of rail cars is uneven, Skabo participated in other manufacturing, including coachworks for trucks, buses and taxicabs. The first Norwegian-produced trolleybus was delivered from Skabo in 1911. Also technical devices and stalls and in 1926 firewood powered snow melters; the latter contraption rather unsuccessful. In 1948 the company was bought by Norsk Elektrisk & Brown Boveri (NEBB), who sold it to Strømmens Værksted in 1959; moving all activity to Strømmen and closing the Skøyen plant.

== Stock ==
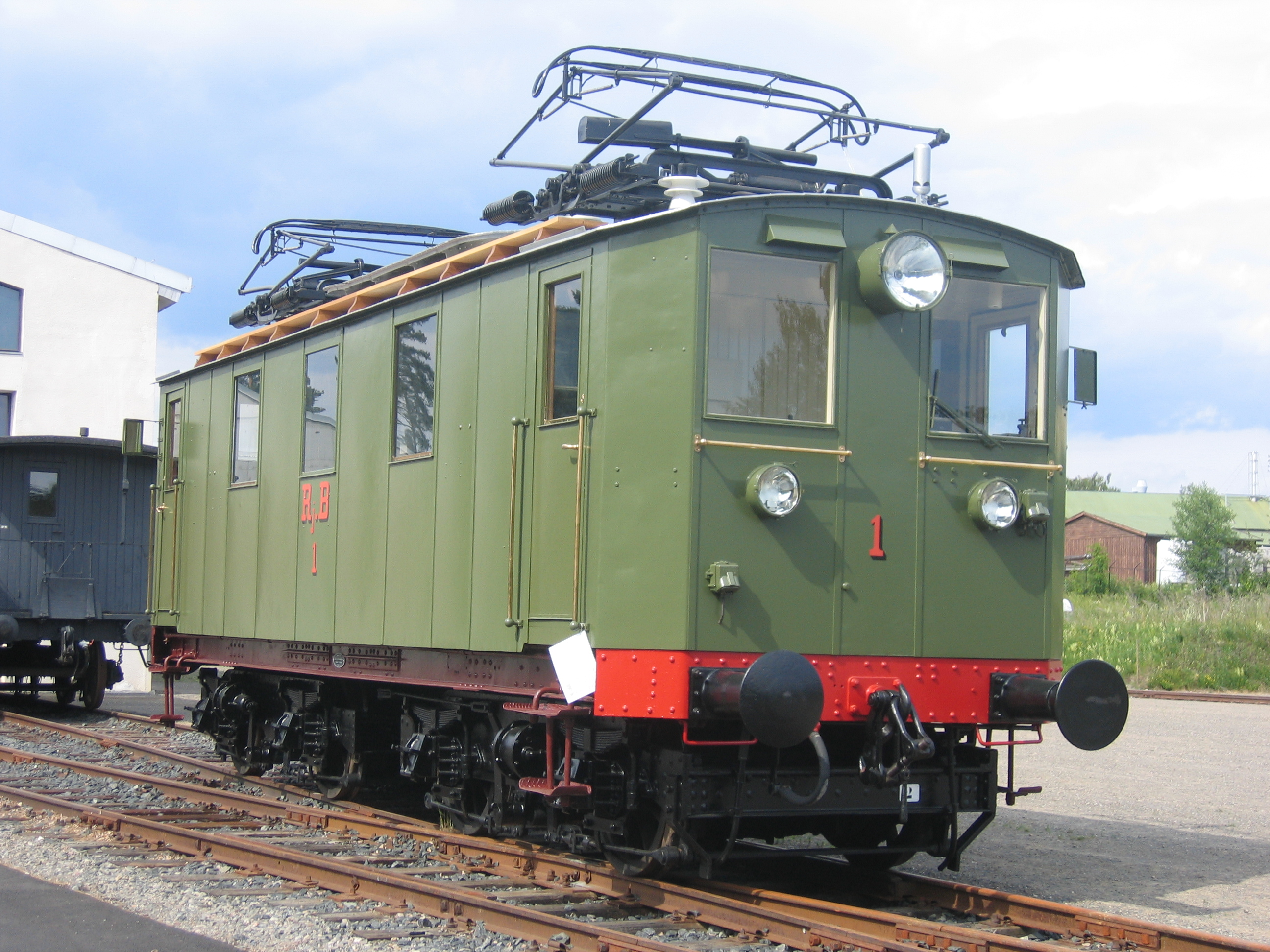
Skabo built the chassis for the NSB El 7

Skabo has built the chassis the NSB El 6 and NSB El 7 electric locomotives delivered to Rjukanbanen, for locomotives no. 5 and 6 on Thamshavnbanen, and for the multiple units type 62, type 65, type 66, type 67, type 68 and type 88. The electrical components for these were often built by Norsk Elektrisk & Brown Boveri or foreign companies like AEG or ASEA.

Many of the wooden passenger cars delivered to both Norges Statsbaner and others are built by Skabo. This included the cars delivered to Urskog-Hølandsbanen and Nesttun-Osbanen. For NSB the models included A11, A20, A21, B2, B3, B9, B20, B23, B30, B31, DF37, F2, F3, F20, R1, R20, WLAB, WLB and ZU21.

For Oslo Sporveier Skabo built several trams, including models KSS 32, KSS 95, KSS96, Hkb 42, EB 1001, EB 1007, OS 397, Hkb 110, EB 1013, Hkb 205, OS 166, OS 170 and EB 1011.

In Trondheim Skabo delivered one tram of TS Class 1 in addition to TS Class 2 and TS Class 5 for Trondheim Sporvei and GB Class 2 for A/S Graakalbanen.
