= NSB Class 68 =

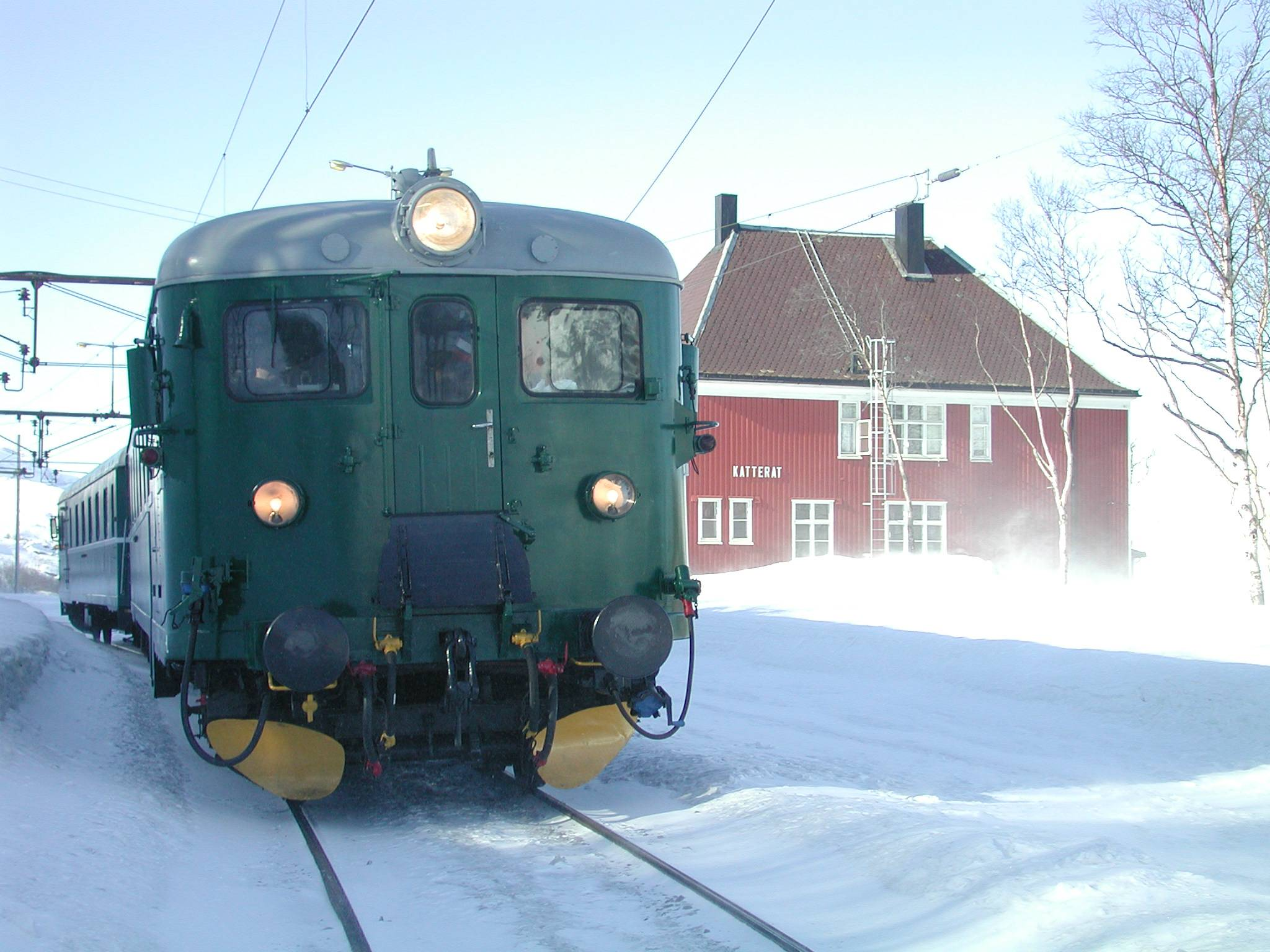
- A type 68 operated by Ofotbanen
- In service: 1956–2001
- Manufacturer: Norsk Elektrisk & Brown Boveri, Skabo and Strømmen
- Constructed: 1956–1958, 1960–1961
- Number built: 30 units
- Number scrapped: 10
- Formation: 3 car sets
- Fleet numbers: 68.01 – 68.90
- Operators: Norges Statsbaner; Ofotbanen

Specifications
- Car length: Motor cars: 20.95 m (68.7 ft); Centre cars: 20.92 m (68.6 ft); End cars: 21.08 m (69.2 ft)
- Doors: 12 per unit
- Maximum speed: 100 km/h (62 mph)
- Weight: Motor cars, A: 51.2–52.1 km/h (31.8–32.4 mph); Motor cars, B: 53.3 km/h (33.1 mph); Centre cars, A: 27.0–27.5 km/h (16.8–17.1 mph); Centre cars, B: 29.0 km/h (18.0 mph); End cars, A: 28.0–28.5 km/h (17.4–17.7 mph); End cars, B: 30.0 km/h (18.6 mph)
- Traction system: 4 x NEBB ELM 421St
- Power output: 640 kW (860 hp)
- Electric system(s): 15 kV 16.7 Hz AC Catenary
- Current collector(s): Pantograph
- Track gauge: 1,435 mm (4 ft 8 1/2 in)

NSB Class 68 (Norwegian: NSB type 68) is a three-car electric multiple unit operated by Norges Statsbaner between 1956 and 2001. It was mainly used for local trains as well as branch lines. The units were built in two series, the A-series being delivered in 21 units between 1956-58 and the B-series in nine units between 1960–61. The motor cars were built by Norsk Elektrisk & Brown Boveri and Skabo while the centre and end cars were built either by Skabo or by Strømmen.

Though the units were taken out of service between 1994 and 2001, three units were taken over by the Ofotbanen for operation on the Ofoten Line.
