= NSB El 5 =

Class of Norwegian electric locomotives

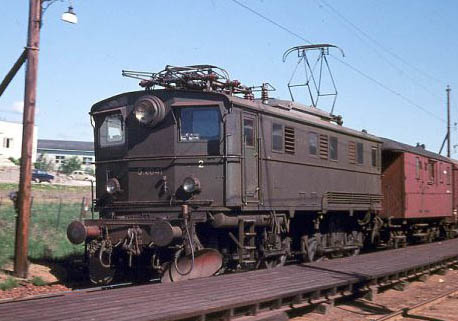
- NSB El 5 2041 outside Sandesund Station
Type and origin
- Power type: Electric
- Builder: AEG; Siemens; Norsk Elektrisk & Brown Boveri; Hamar Jernstøperi; Thune
- Build date: 1927–1936
- Total produced: 12
Specifications
- Configuration
  - UIC: B'B'
- Gauge: 1,435 mm (4 ft 8 1/2 in) standard gauge
- Length: 13.1 m (42 ft 11 3/4 in)
- Loco weight: 66.8 t (65.7 long tons; 73.6 short tons)
- Electric system/s: 15 kV 16 2/3 Hz AC Catenary
- Current pickup: Pantograph
Performance figures
- Maximum speed: 70 km/h (43 mph)
- Power output: 1,044 kW (1,400 hp)
Career
- Operators: Norwegian State Railways
- Numbers: 5 2035 – 5043; 5 2051 – 5 2053
- Locale: Rjukan Line
- Retired: 1972
- Current owner: Norwegian Railway Museum (2039)

NSB El 5 was an electric locomotive built by AEG, Norsk Elektrisk & Brown Boveri, Siemens, Hamar Jernstøperi and Thune between 1927 and 1936, with a total of 12 units being delivered to the Norwegian State Railways. They were capable of 1,044 kW and top speed of 70 km/h. Number 2039 is preserved by the Norwegian Railway Museum.
