= NSB Class 67 =

Norwegian train

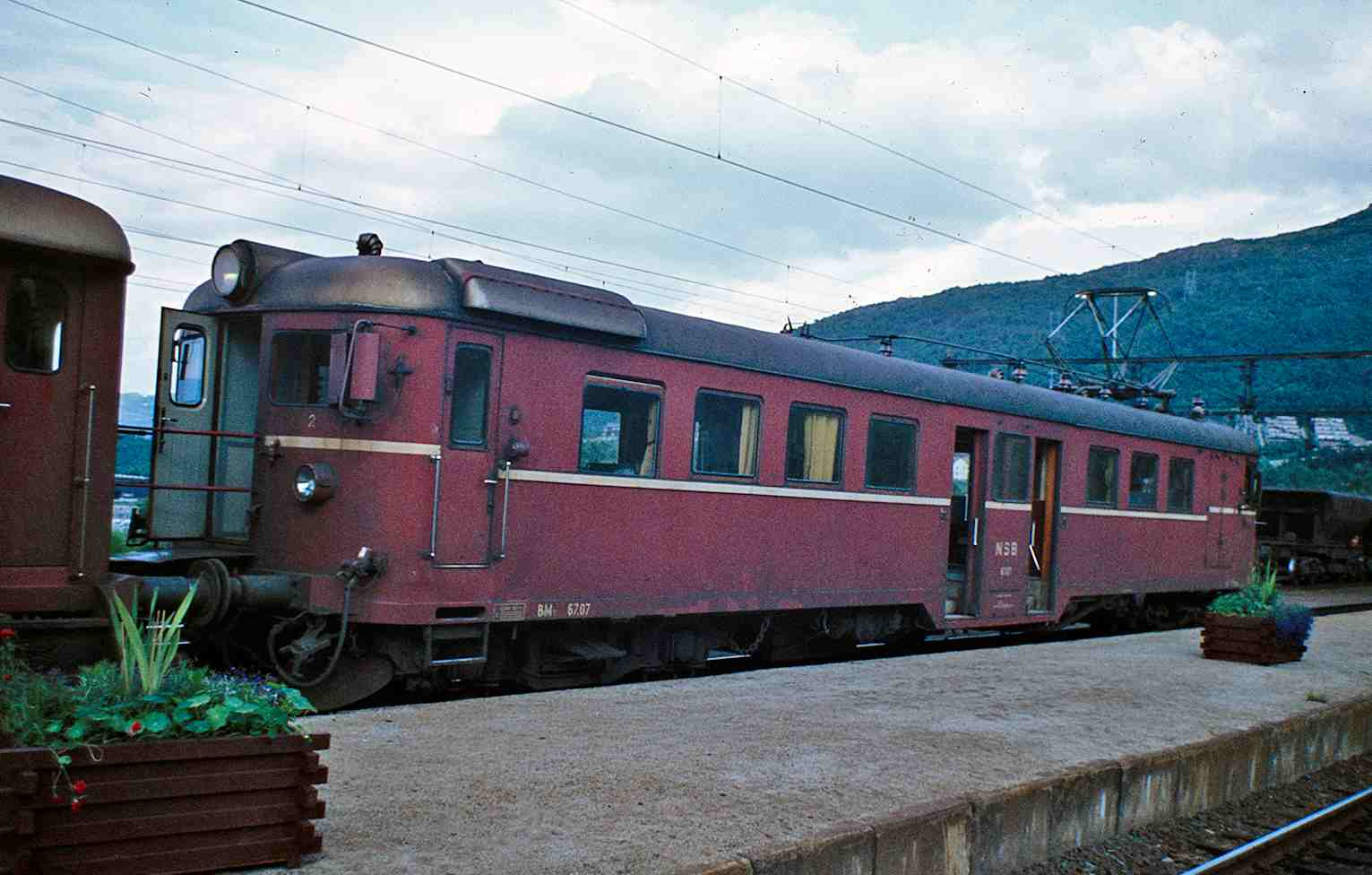
- In service: 1953–1995
- Manufacturer: Norsk Elektrisk & Brown Boveri, Skabo and Strømmen
- Constructed: 1953–1955
- Number built: 18 units
- Formation: 3 cars
- Fleet numbers: 67.01–67.18; 67.31–67.48; 67.61–67.78
- Operators: Norwegian State Railways

Specifications
- Car length: Motor cars: 20.95 m (68 ft 9 in); Centre cars: 20.92 m (68 ft 8 in); End cars: 21.08 m (69 ft 2 in)
- Maximum speed: 70 km/h (43 mph)
- Weight: Motor cars: 51.5 t (50.7 long tons; 56.8 short tons); Centre cars: 27.0–28.5 t (26.6–28.0 long tons; 29.8–31.4 short tons); End cars: 28.5–30.0 t (28.0–29.5 long tons; 31.4–33.1 short tons)
- Traction system: 4 x NEBB ELM 421 St
- Power output: 468 kW (628 hp)
- Electric system(s): 15 kV 16 2/3 Hz AC Catenary
- Current collector(s): Pantograph
- Track gauge: 1,435 mm (4 ft 8 1/2 in)

NSB Class 67 is a three-car electric multiple unit operated by the Norwegian State Railways between 1953 and 1995. It was mainly used for local trains as well as branch lines. A total of 18 3-car units were delivered between 1953 and 1955. The motor cars were built by Norsk Elektrisk & Brown Boveri and Skabo while the centre cars were built by Strømmen and the end cars by Skabo.
