= Norsk Elektrisk & Brown Boveri =

Canadian rolling stock and rail transport manufacturer

NEBB
- Company type: Subsidiary
- Industry: Rail transport
- Founded: 1874; 152 years ago
- Fate: Acquired By Bombardier
- Successor: Bombardier; ABB
- Headquarters: Oslo, Norway
- Area served: Worldwide
- Products: Locomotives; High-speed trains Intercity and commuter trains Trams; People movers Signalling systems
- Website: www.nebb.com

Norsk Elektrisk & Brown Boveri A/S also known as NEBB was a Norwegian manufacturing company, which built a lot of the rolling stock that is used by Norges Statsbaner. The plant was located at Skøyen. In 1988, it merged into Asea Brown Boveri (ABB).

== History ==
Frognerkilens Fabrikk was founded in 1874 with focus on agricultural machinery. In 1881 it started production of the first electric motor and, in 1894, it changed its name to Norsk Elektrisk A/S. Cooperation with Brown, Boveri & Cie (BBC) started in 1905 and, in 1908, BBC bought the company, giving it the name NEBB. In 1948, NEBB acquired Skabo Jernbanevognfabrikk that made railway wagons, merging the two companies, though Skabo was closed and sold to Strømmens Værksted in 1973. In 1979, Strømmens Værksted was bought by NEBB. In 1988 BBC merged with ASEA to found Asea Brown Boveri (ABB) and NEBB was merged into the new corporation, losing its former identity. Today, NEBB is part of Bombardier Transportation.

== Production ==
NEBB has been an important producer of rolling stock for the Norwegian State Railways (NSB), including the following models:

- NSB El 4 locomotive
- NSB El 5 locomotive
- NSB El 8 locomotive
- NSB El 9 locomotive
- NSB El 14 locomotive
- NSB BM65 multiple unit
