= Torp station =

Railway station in Sandefjord, Norway

Torp
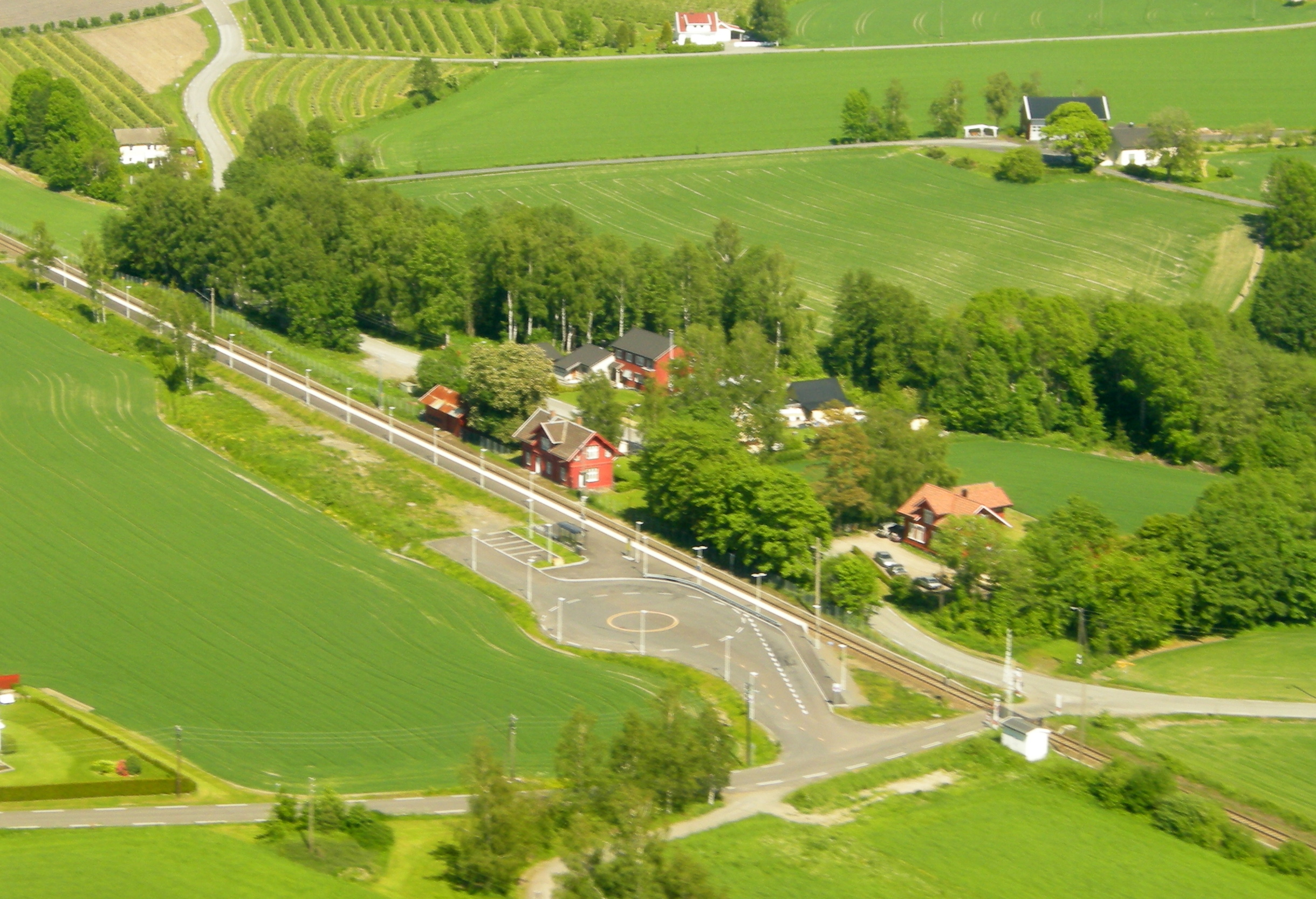

General information
- Location: Råstad, Sandefjord Municipality; Norway
- Coordinates: 59°09′54″N 10°15′56″E
- Elevation: 58.0 m (190.3 ft)
- Owner: Bane NOR
- Operator: Vy
- Line: Vestfold Line
- Distance: 135.10 km (83.95 mi)
- Platforms: 1
- Connections: Shuttle bus to Sandefjord Airport, Torp

History
- Opened: 7 December 1881
Location

Torp Station (Norwegian: Torp stasjon), also known as Sandefjord Airport Station (Sandefjord Lufthavn stasjon), is on the Vestfold Line in Sandefjord Municipality, in Vestfold county, Norway. It is served with regional trains operated by Vy. Located close to Sandefjord Airport, Torp, the station is served by a free four-minute shuttle bus service from the station to the airport. The trains operate northwards via towns in Vestfold to Drammen and Oslo and onwards via Oslo Airport, Gardermoen to towns in Innlandet county. Southwards, the trains serve Sandefjord, Larvik and Grenland.

The station opened as Raastad, later Råstad, in 1881. It had a single building, designed by Balthazar Lange. It was upgraded with a passing loop in 1910, but this was removed in 1971, and the station was closed in 1978. In 2008, the station reopened to serve the airport. The station is owned by the Norwegian National Rail Administration.

== Service ==
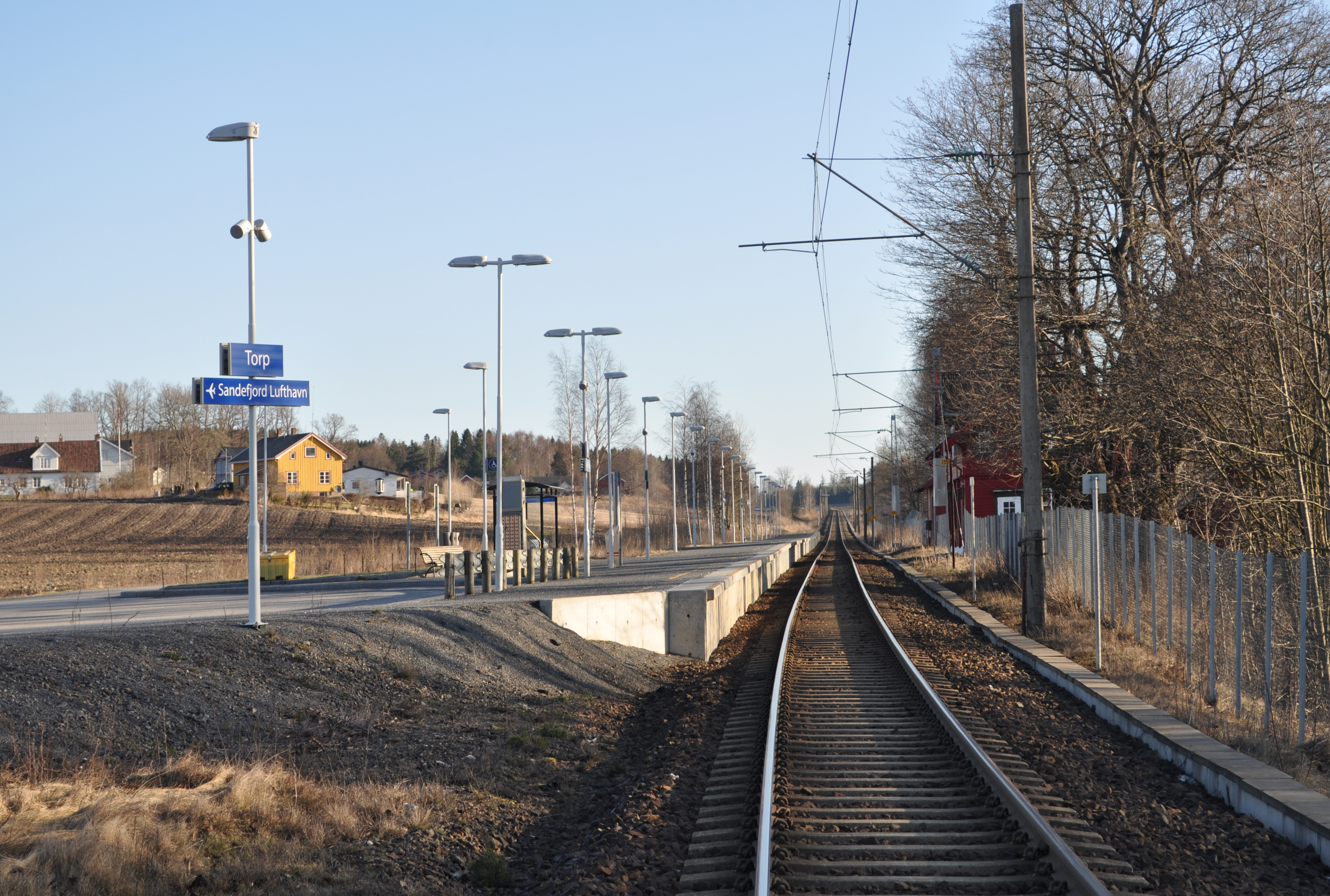
The station consists of a single platform and one track

Torp Station's primary function is to serve as an airport rail link for Sandefjord Airport. The station is served by regional trains that operate northwards via towns such as Tønsberg, Holmestrand, and Drammen to Oslo Central Station and onwards via Oslo Airport to Hamar and Lillehammer, calling at several other smaller stations. Southwards, the trains serve Sandefjord, Larvik, Porsgrunn and Skien. Travel time to Oslo is 1 hour and 48 minutes, and to Oslo Airport it is 2 hours 23 minutes.

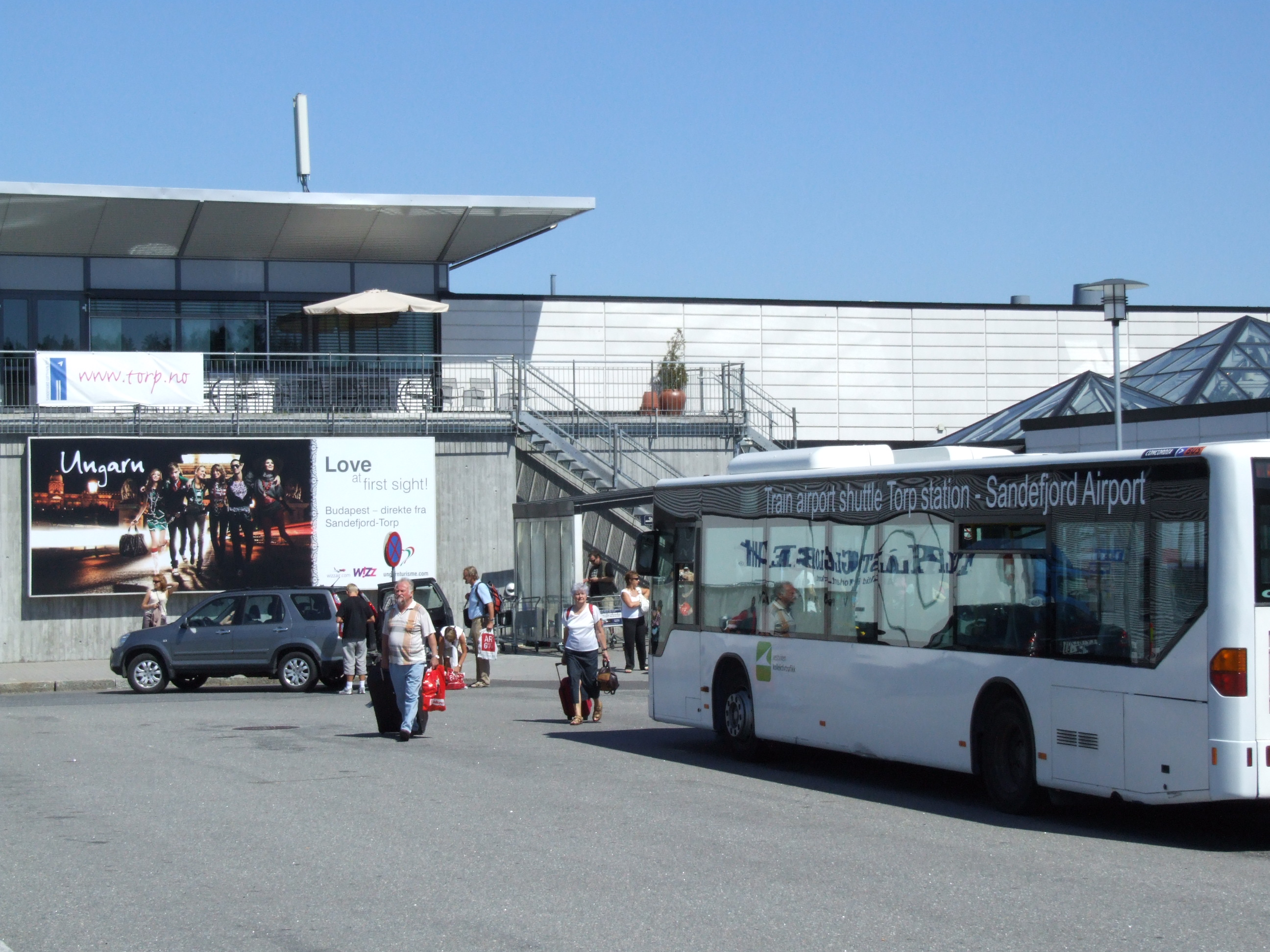
A shuttle bus at Sandefjord Airport, Torp

The station is equipped with a shed, but no other amenities, and also lacks a ticket machine. The platform (but not necessarily the train) is wheelchair accessible. There are about ten parking spaces at the station. A shuttle bus corresponds to all trains during the opening hours of the airport, and a bus trip takes four minutes to the airport terminal. The shuttle bus leaves the airport ten minutes before each train's scheduled departure. The bus is operated by NSB, and is included in the price of the train ticket. There are 42 bus departures each day. The train supplements a coach service, Torp-Ekspressen operated by Unibuss Ekspress, to Oslo, and a local bus service to Sandefjord, operated by Tide Buss for Vestfold Kollektivtrafikk.

== History ==
The station was originally named Raastad, and opened as part of the Vestfold Line on 7 December 1881. It was located in the old Sandar Municipality, that was also served by Jåstad Station. Raastad was equipped with a wooden station building designed by Balthazar Lange, and cargo expedition. There was initially only one track, but on 1 July 1910, a passing loop was installed at the station, allowing trains to pass. The station was renamed Råstad in April 1921. In 1969–70 the passing loop was extended, but already on 15 September 1971 it was disabled, and subsequently removed, with the automation of the signaling. The station became unstaffed on 1 October 1971 and was closed on 28 May 1978. The following day, the new "InterCity" services started on the Vestfold Line.

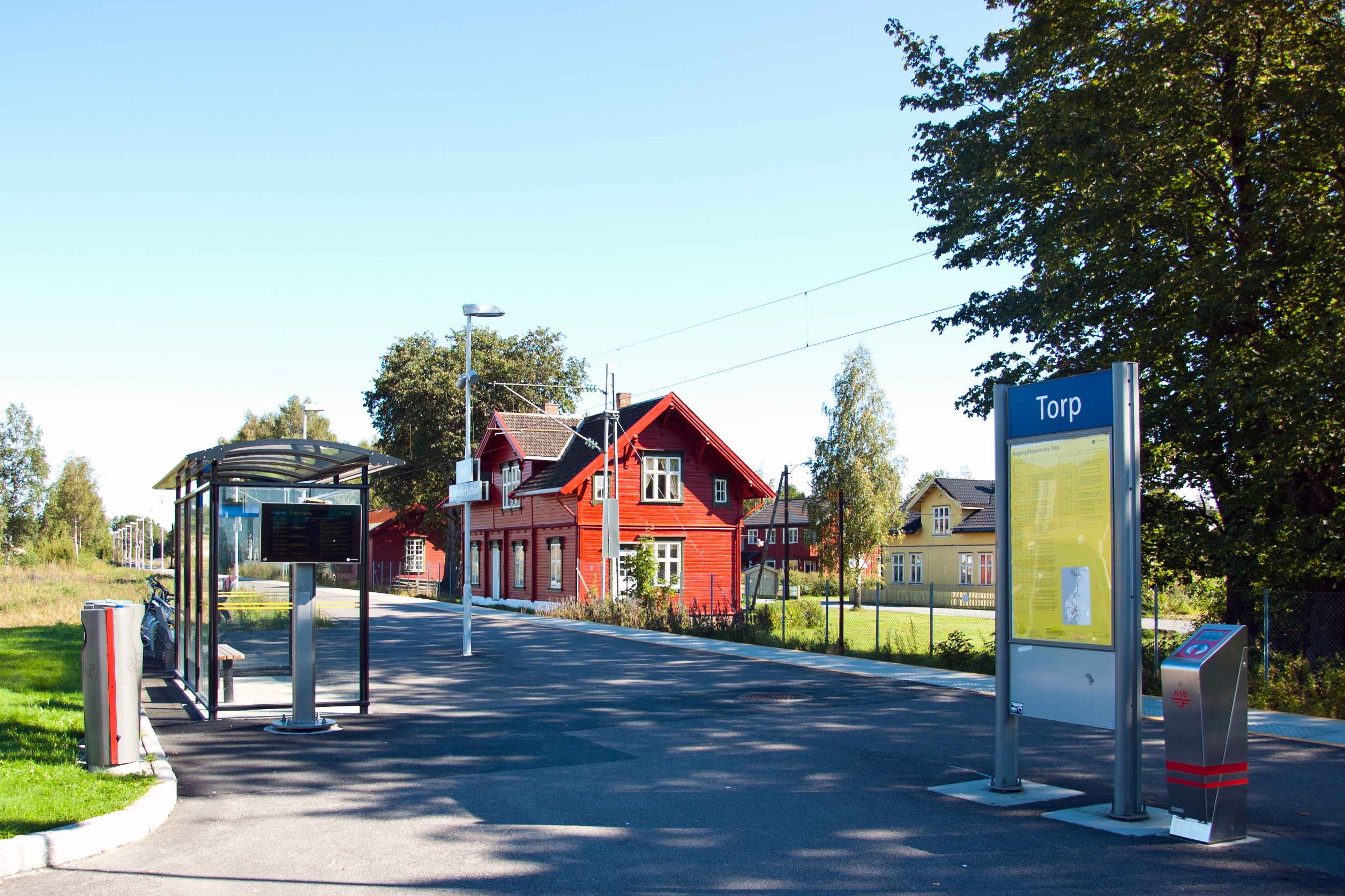
The station area

Sandefjord Airport experienced a rapid growth as an airport for low-cost carriers serving Eastern Norway since the late 1990s. Along with the success of the Airport Express Train that connects Oslo with Oslo Airport, Gardermoen, and the decision to provide a shuttle service to the competing Moss Airport, Rygge from Rygge Station, local politicians took initiative to open a dedicated stop for the airport. During the planning of the high-speed upgrade of the line, plans called to move the line to create a station integrated into the airport terminal, as had been done with Oslo Airport Station and Trondheim Airport Station. However, as the construction of a new Vestfold Line was put on hold, an intermediate solution was found to reopen Råstad Station, and offer a shuttle bus to the airport. On 16 May 2007, Vestfold County Municipality announced that they would forward the investment costs of 7 million kr for the new station, with a payback from the National Rail Administration by 2012. The latter would build, own and operate the station. The station opened on 21 January 2008, and the new platform is located on the east side of the tracks. The old station building, location in the west side, has been converted into a museum. During the first year, 80,000 passengers used the station, sufficient to make the NOK 4.5 million used by NSB on the shuttle bus profitable.

Preceding station			Following station
Sandefjord; Tue	Vestfold Line		Stokke; Unneberg
Preceding station	Regional trains		Following station
Sandefjord	RE11	Skien–Oslo S–Eidsvoll	Stokke
