= Sandefjord Station =

Railway station in Sandefjord, Norway

Sandefjord
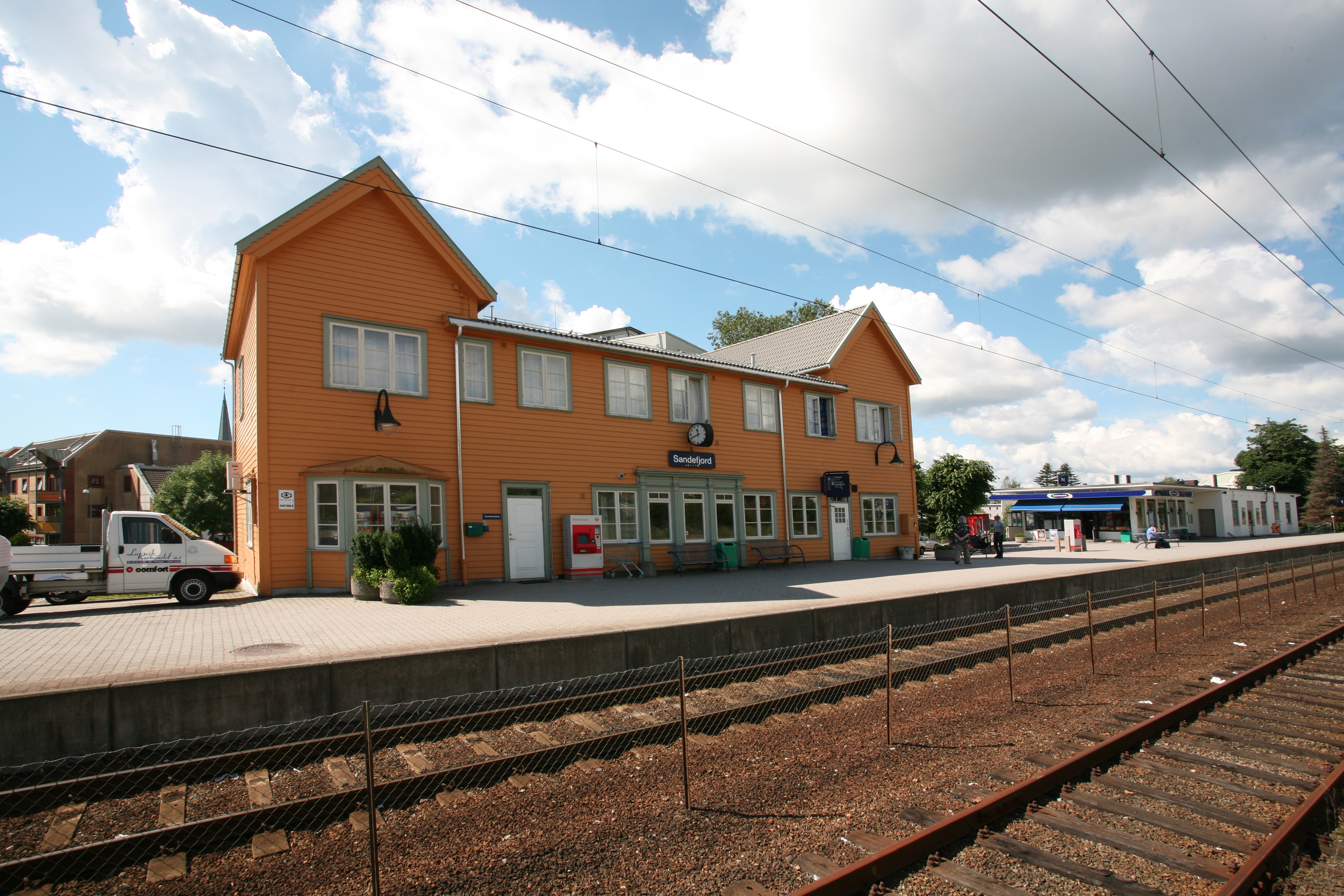

General information
- Location: Sandefjord, Sandefjord Municipality; Norway
- Coordinates: 59°08′07″N 10°13′22″E
- Elevation: 14.5 m (48 ft) amsl
- Owner: Bane NOR
- Operator: Vy
- Line: Vestfold Line
- Distance: 139.52 km (86.69 mi)
- Platforms: 2
- Connections: Bus: VKT

History
- Opened: 1881
Location

Sandefjord Station (Norwegian: Sandefjord stasjon) is a railway station on the Vestfold Line in the town of Sandefjord in Sandefjord Municipality, Norway. The station is served with regional trains operated by Vy. The station opened as part of the Vestfold Line in 1881. Norsk Spisevognselskap took over operations of the restaurant on 1 January 1940. The first train came to Sandefjord in 1881, on its way to neighboring Larvik. In the 1950s, the steam locomotive was replaced by the less noisy electric run train.

Sandefjord Station originally had three railway tracks when established in 1881. It also had one track which led through town and down to the harbor, known as Havesporet. It also had a side-track which led to National Industri, later known as Corneliussen mekaniske verksted. Goods from industry made up a large amount of the station's original traffic. Passenger traffic increased largely during summers due to tourism.

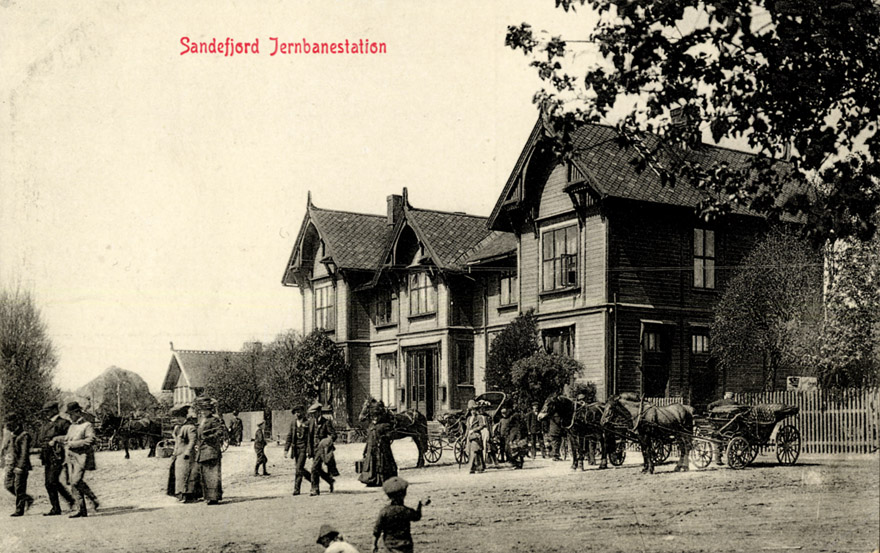
Sandefjord Station in the late 19th or early 20th century.

The station has an elevation of 14.5 meters. It lies 600 meters from the harbor. It lies adjacent to the city's bus station, which is located immediately across the street from Sandefjord Station. Its property is made up of 460 m^{2} and it is located at Jernbaneplassen by Sandar Church. It was designed by architect Balthazar Lange. A Narvesen convenience store is located at the station, while a grocery store is found across the street.

| Preceding station | | | Following station |
|---|---|---|---|
| Larvik | Vestfold Line | | Torp |
| Preceding station | Regional trains | | Following station |
| Larvik | RE11 | Skien–Oslo S–Eidsvoll | Torp |
