= Stokke Station =

Railway station in Sandefjord, Norway

Stokke
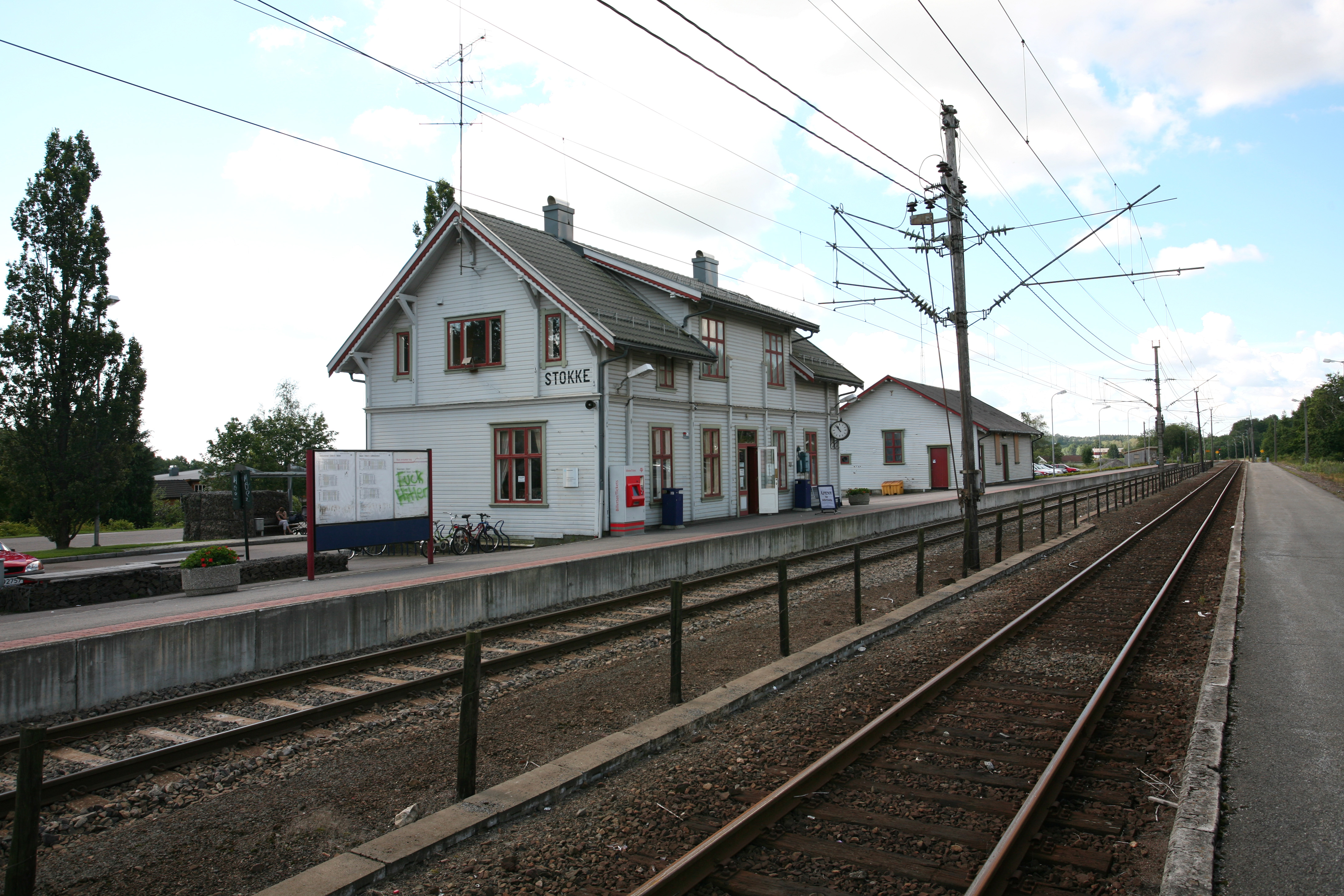

General information
- Location: Stokke, Norway
- Coordinates: 59°13′17″N 10°18′01″E
- Elevation: 58.0 m (190.3 ft)
- Owner: Bane NOR
- Operator: Vy
- Line: Vestfold Line
- Distance: 128.24 km (79.68 mi)
- Platforms: 2
- Connections: Bus: VKT

History
- Opened: 1881
Location

Stokke Station (Norwegian: Stokke stasjon) is a railway station on the Vestfold Line in Stokke, Norway. The station is served with regional trains operated by Vy. The station was built as part of the Vestfold Line in 1881.

| Preceding station | | | Following station |
|---|---|---|---|
| Sandefjord Airport | Vestfold Line | | Tønsberg |
| Preceding station | Regional trains | | Following station |
| Sandefjord Airport | RE11 | Skien–Oslo S–Eidsvoll | Tønsberg |
