= Larvik Station =

Railway station in Larvik, Norway

Larvik
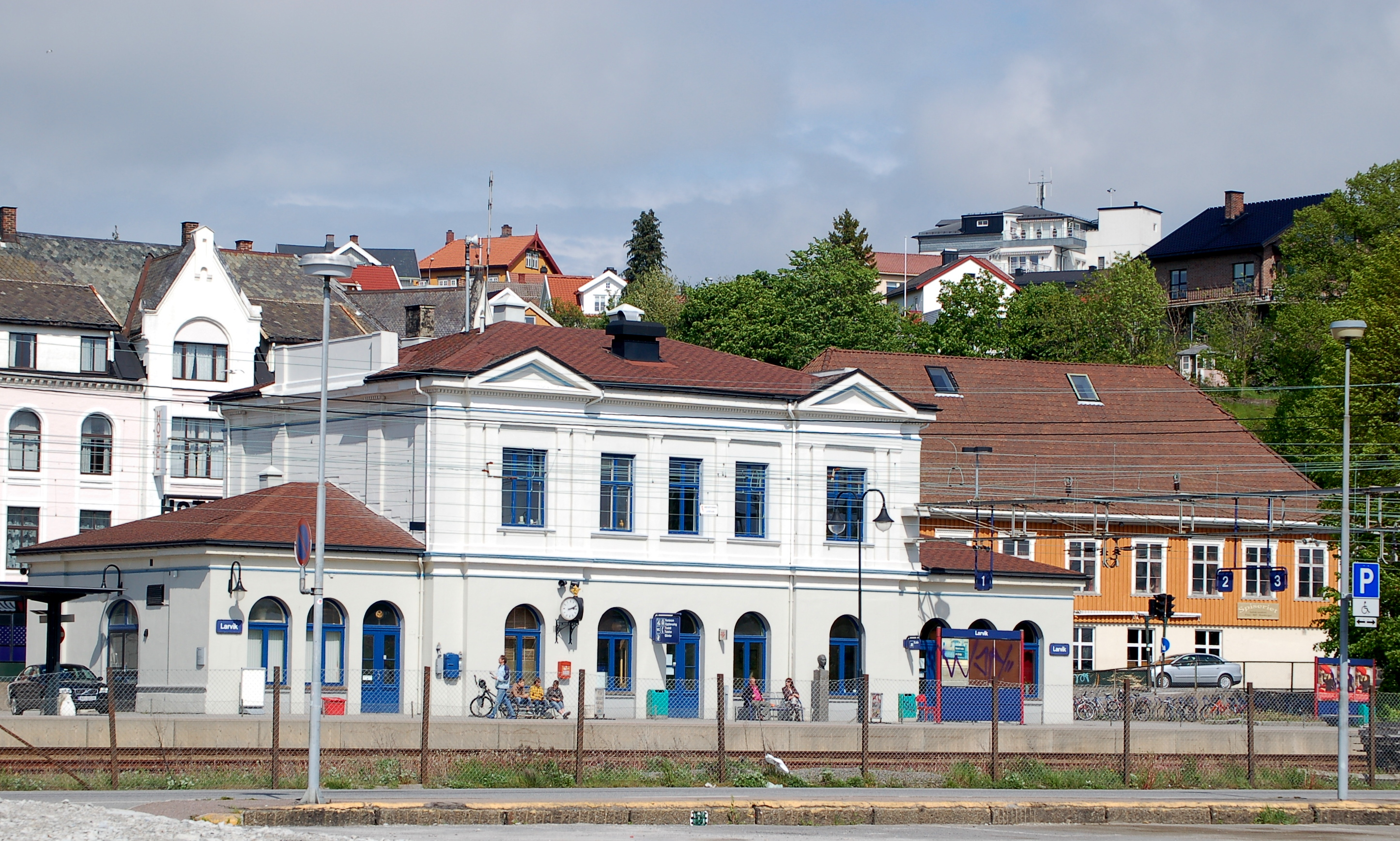

General information
- Location: Larvik, Larvik Municipality; Norway
- Coordinates: 59°03′00″N 10°01′54″E
- Elevation: 1.7 m (5 ft 7 in)
- Owner: Bane NOR
- Operator: Vy
- Line: Vestfold Line
- Distance: 158.66 km (98.59 mi)
- Platforms: 2
- Connections: Bus: VKT

Construction
- Architect: Balthazar Lange

History
- Opened: 13 October 1881
Location

Larvik Station (Norwegian: Larvik stasjon) is a railway station in the town of Larvik in Larvik Municipality in Vestfold county, Norway. The station is served with regional trains operated by Vy. The station operated as part of the Vestfold Line (Vestfoldbanen). The station building was designed by Balthazar Lange and was opened on 13 October 1881.

Preceding station			Following station
Kjose	Vestfold Line		Sandefjord
Preceding station	Regional trains		Following station
Porsgrunn	RE11	Skien–Oslo S–Eidsvoll	Sandefjord
