= Stokke (village) =

Village in Sandefjord, Norway

- Village
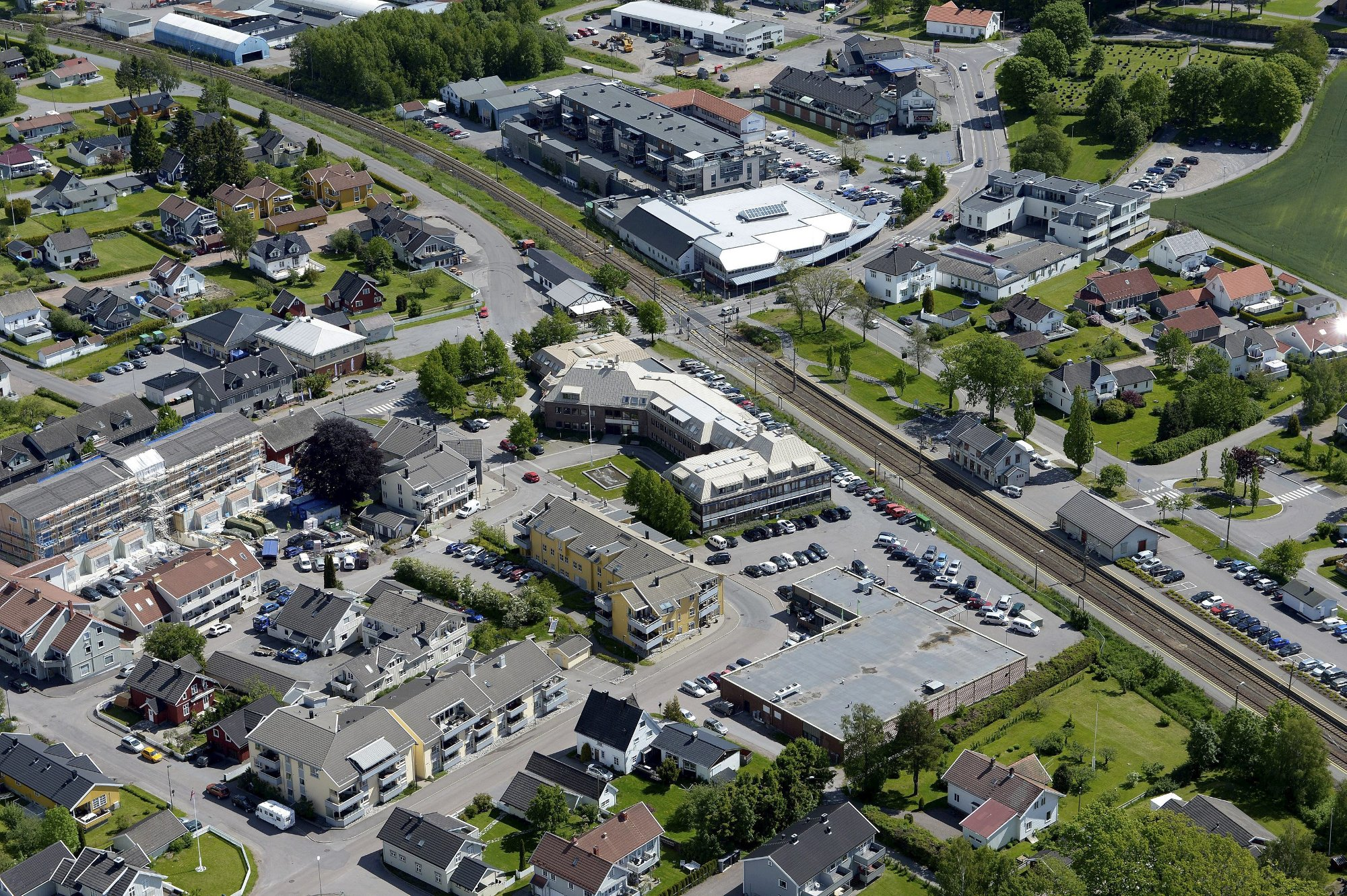
- View of the village centre
- Interactive map of Stokke
- Coordinates: 59.22359°N 10.30032°E
- Country: Norway
- Region: Eastern Norway
- County: Vestfold
- Municipality: Sandefjord Municipality

Area
  - Total: 2.35 km^{2} (0.91 sq mi)
- Elevation: 58 m (190 ft)

Population (2026)
  - Total: 4,288
  - Density: 1,825/km^{2} (4,730/sq mi)
- Time zone: UTC+01:00 (CET)
  - Summer (DST): UTC+02:00 (CEST)
- Post Code: 3160 Stokke

Stokke is a village in Sandefjord Municipality in Vestfold county, Norway. The village is located about 10 kilometres (6.2 mi) to the northeast of the city of Sandefjord and about 10 kilometres (6.2 mi) to the southwest of the city of Tønsberg. The village of Melsomvik and the Tønsbergfjorden lie about 2 kilometres (1.2 mi) to the east of Stokke.

The 2.35-square-kilometre (580-acre) village has a population (2026) of 4,288 and a population density of 1,825 inhabitants per square kilometre (4,730/sq mi).

The European route E18 highway passes 2 kilometres (1.2 mi) to the northwest of the village. The Vestfoldbanen railway line passes through the village, stopping at the Stokke Station. Stokke Church is located in the village. The village is the site of the Bokemoa elementary school and Stokke secondary school. The Gjennestad upper secondary school lies just a short distance north of the village.

== History ==
The village of Stokke was the administrative centre of the old Stokke Municipality which existed from 1838 until its dissolution on 1 January 2017 when it became part of Sandefjord Municipality.

== Media gallery ==
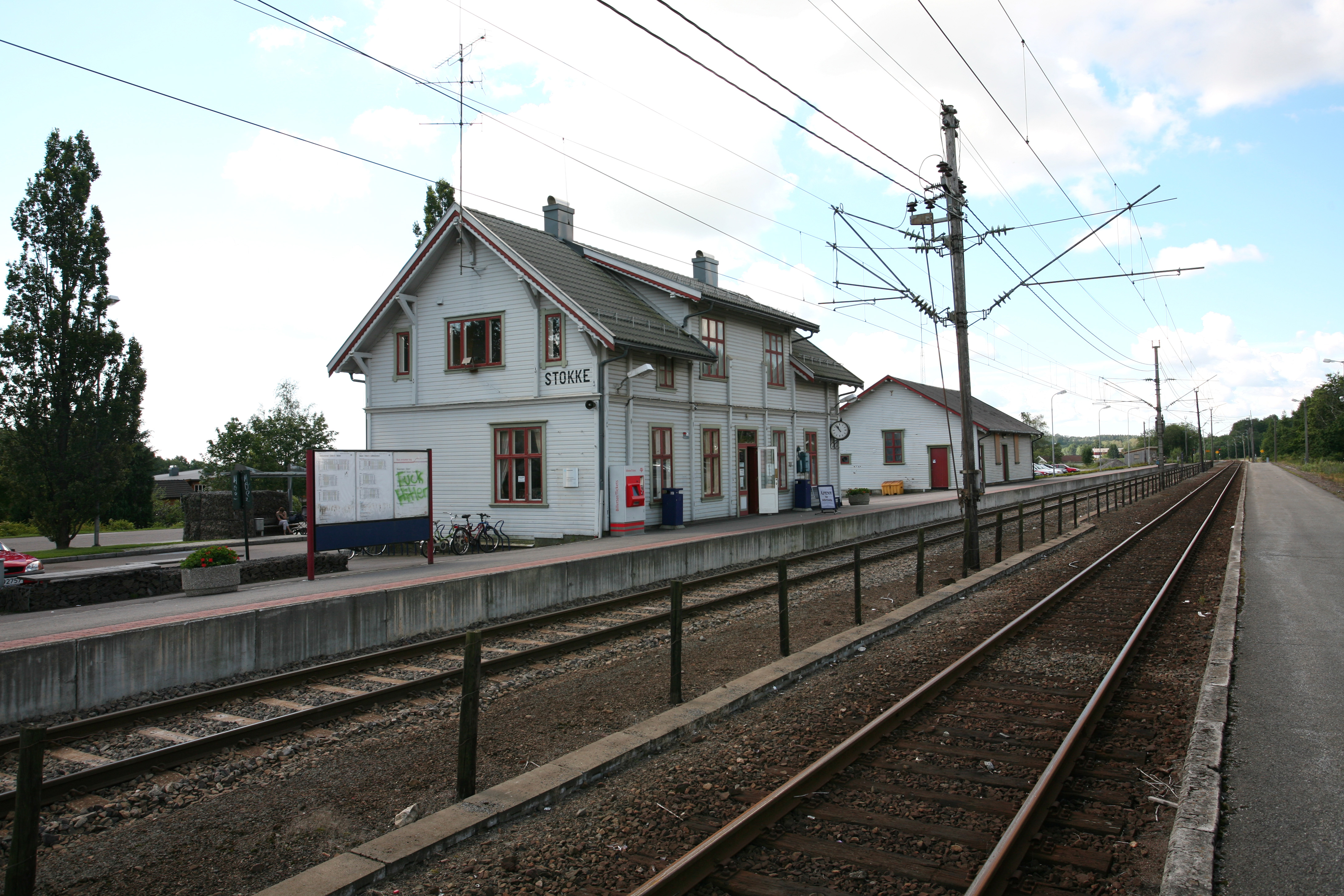
Stokke Station

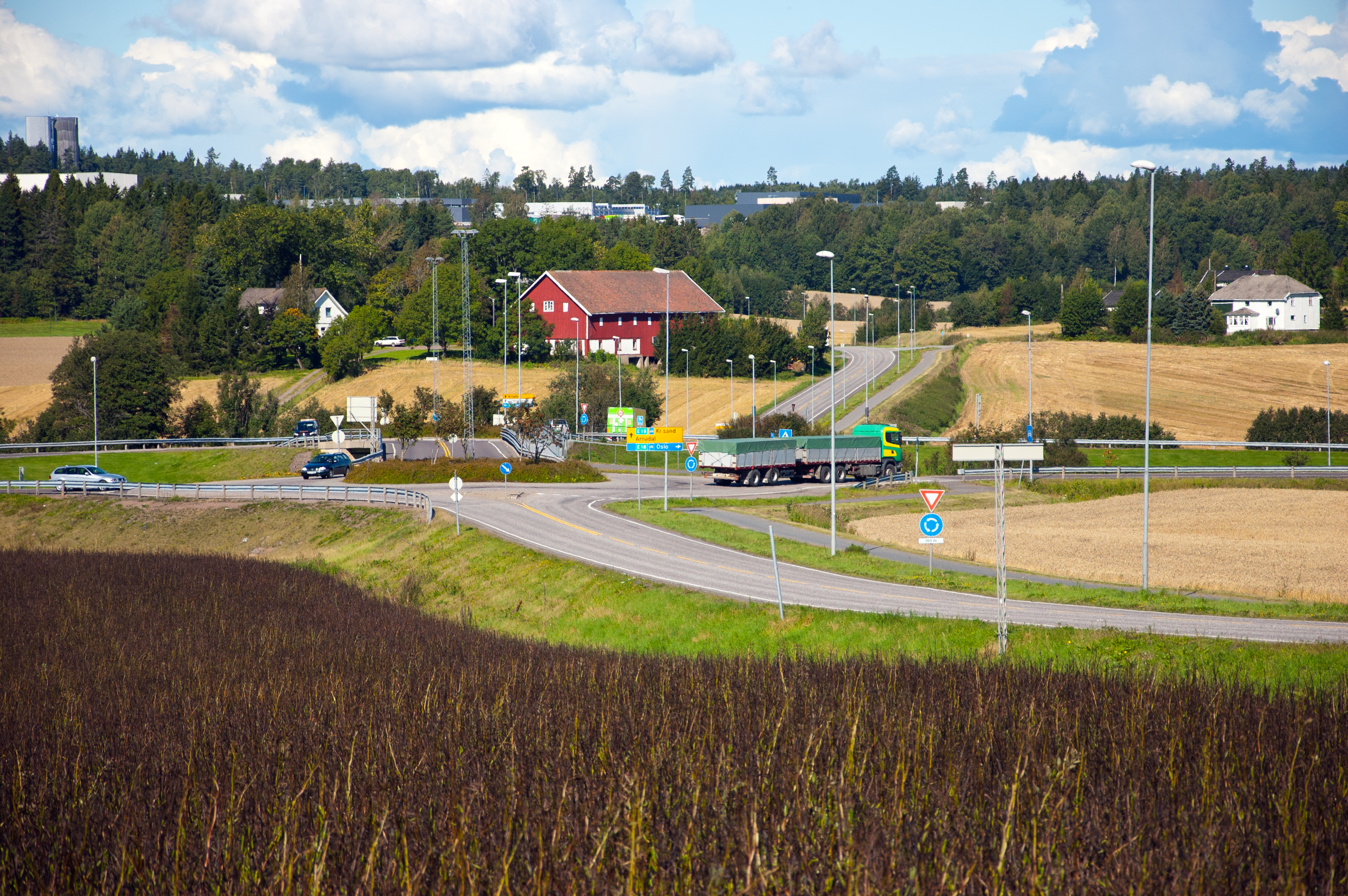
Highway interchange near Stokke

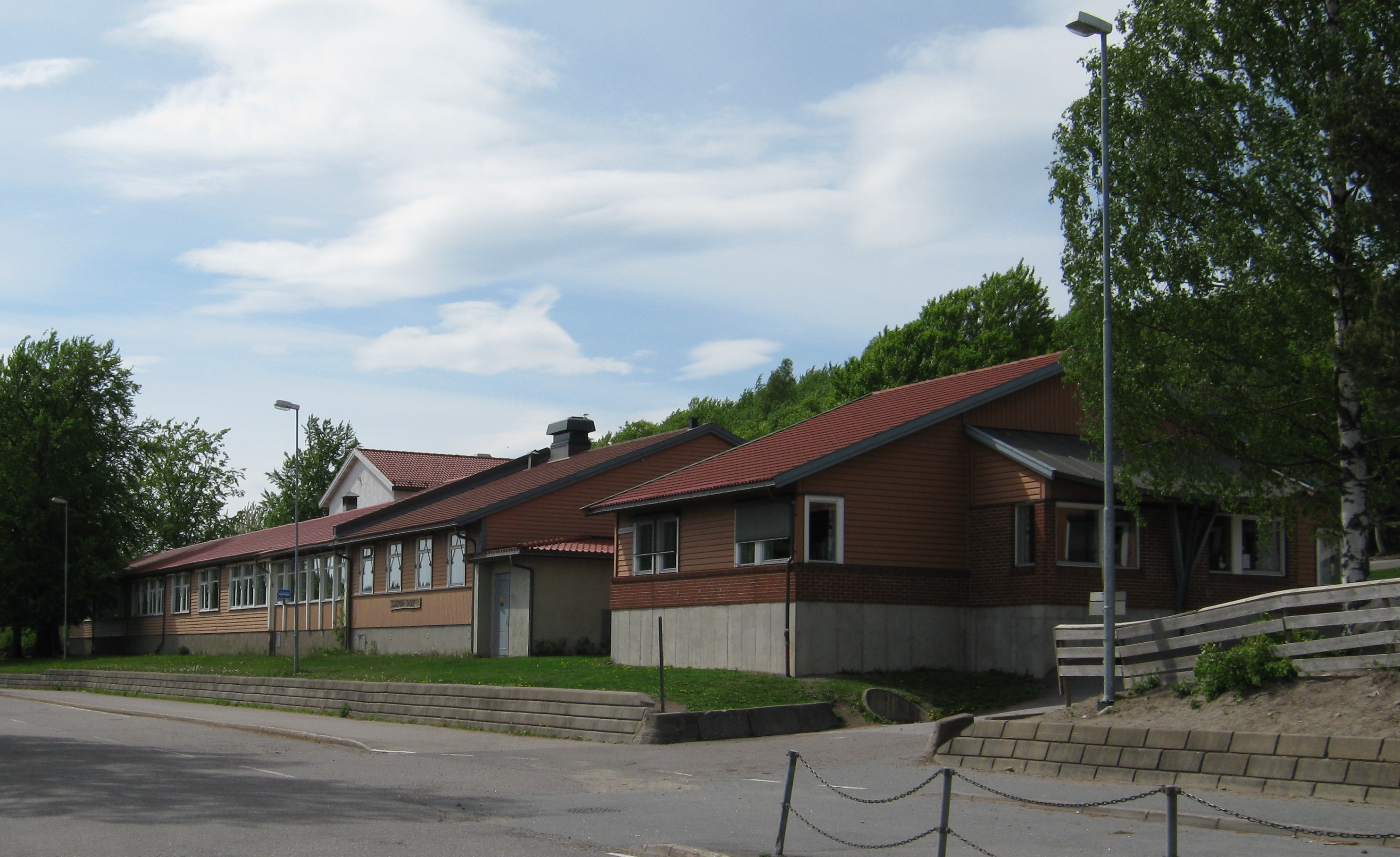
Bokemoa elementary school

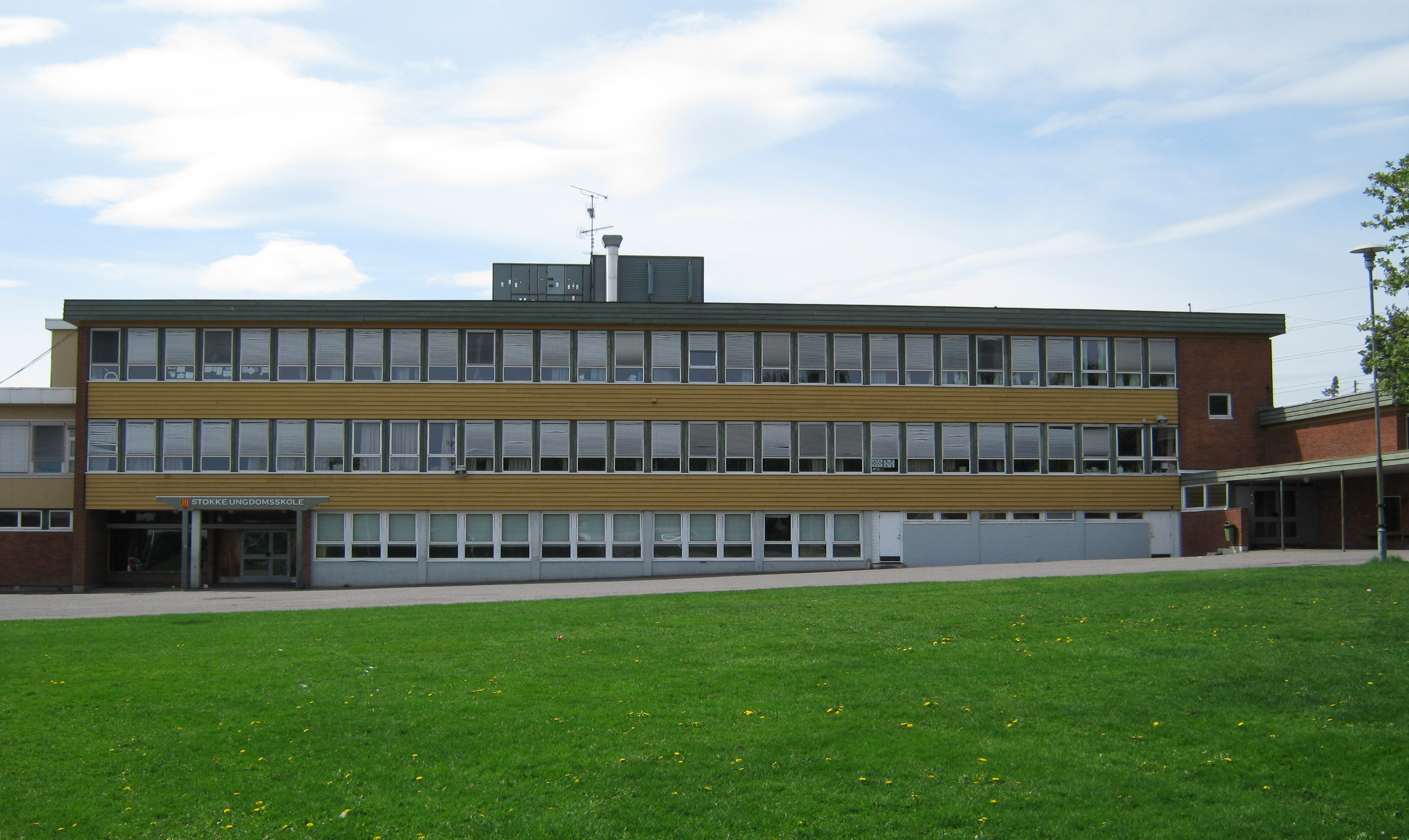
Stokke secondary school

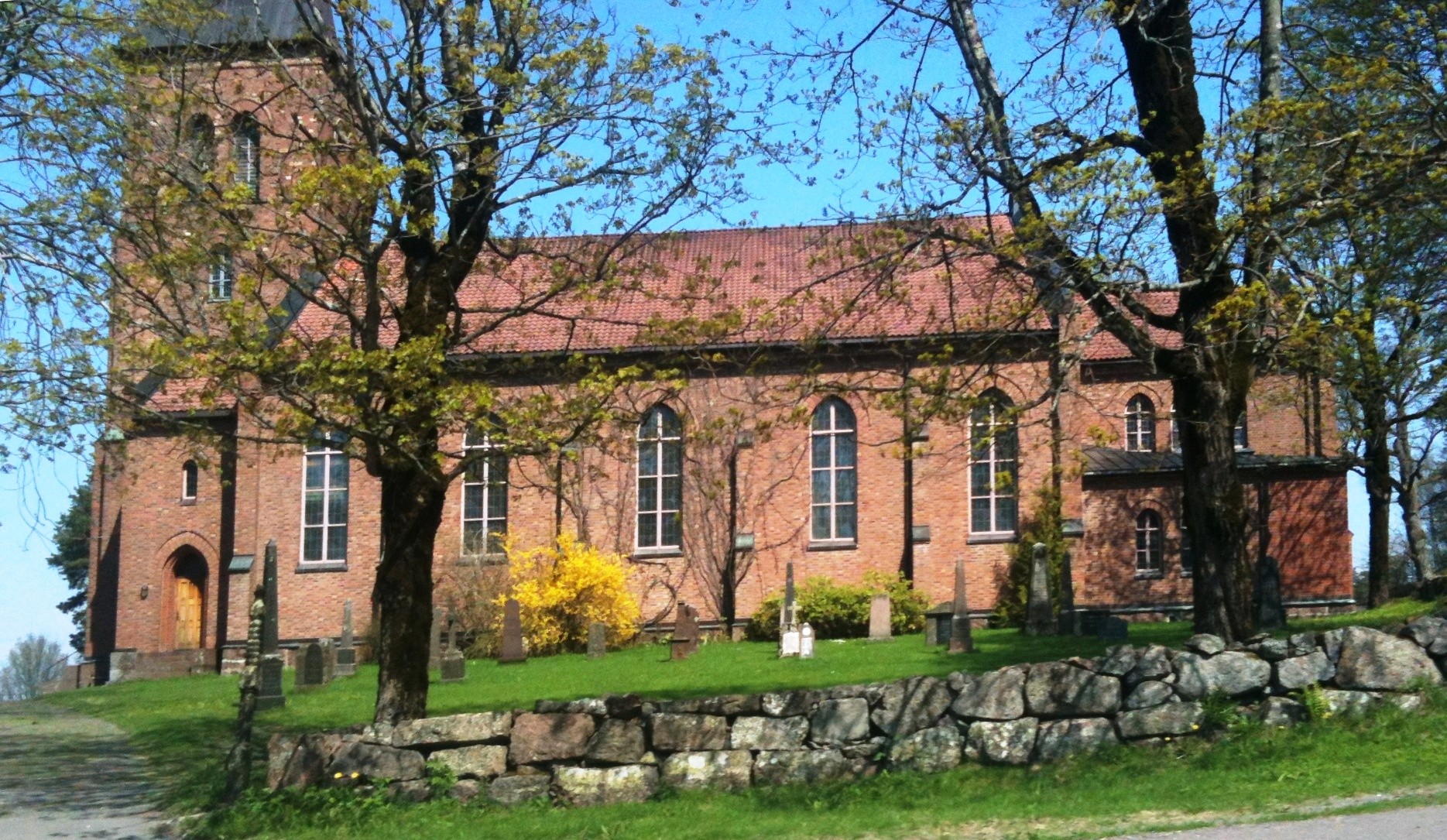
Stokke Church

== Climate ==
Climate data for Melsom 1991-2020 (26 m, avg high/low 2003–2025)
Month	Jan	Feb	Mar	Apr	May	Jun	Jul	Aug	Sep	Oct	Nov	Dec	Year
Mean daily maximum °C (°F)	1.1 (34.0)	2.0 (35.6)	6.1 (43.0)	11.3 (52.3)	16.4 (61.5)	20.4 (68.7)	22.3 (72.1)	21 (70)	17.1 (62.8)	11 (52)	6 (43)	2.4 (36.3)	11.4 (52.6)
Daily mean °C (°F)	−1.6 (29.1)	−1.5 (29.3)	1.4 (34.5)	5.9 (42.6)	11.1 (52.0)	14.9 (58.8)	17.1 (62.8)	16.1 (61.0)	12.1 (53.8)	7.0 (44.6)	2.9 (37.2)	−0.8 (30.6)	7.1 (44.7)
Mean daily minimum °C (°F)	−4.5 (23.9)	−4.2 (24.4)	−2 (28)	1.9 (35.4)	6.6 (43.9)	10.7 (51.3)	12.9 (55.2)	12.0 (53.6)	9.1 (48.4)	4.5 (40.1)	0.8 (33.4)	−3.1 (26.4)	3.7 (38.7)
Average precipitation mm (inches)	93 (3.7)	66 (2.6)	65 (2.6)	61 (2.4)	72 (2.8)	81 (3.2)	75 (3.0)	108 (4.3)	114 (4.5)	136 (5.4)	125 (4.9)	101 (4.0)	1,097 (43.2)
Source: yr.no (mean, precipitation)
