= Tønsberg Station =

Railway station in Tønsberg, Norway

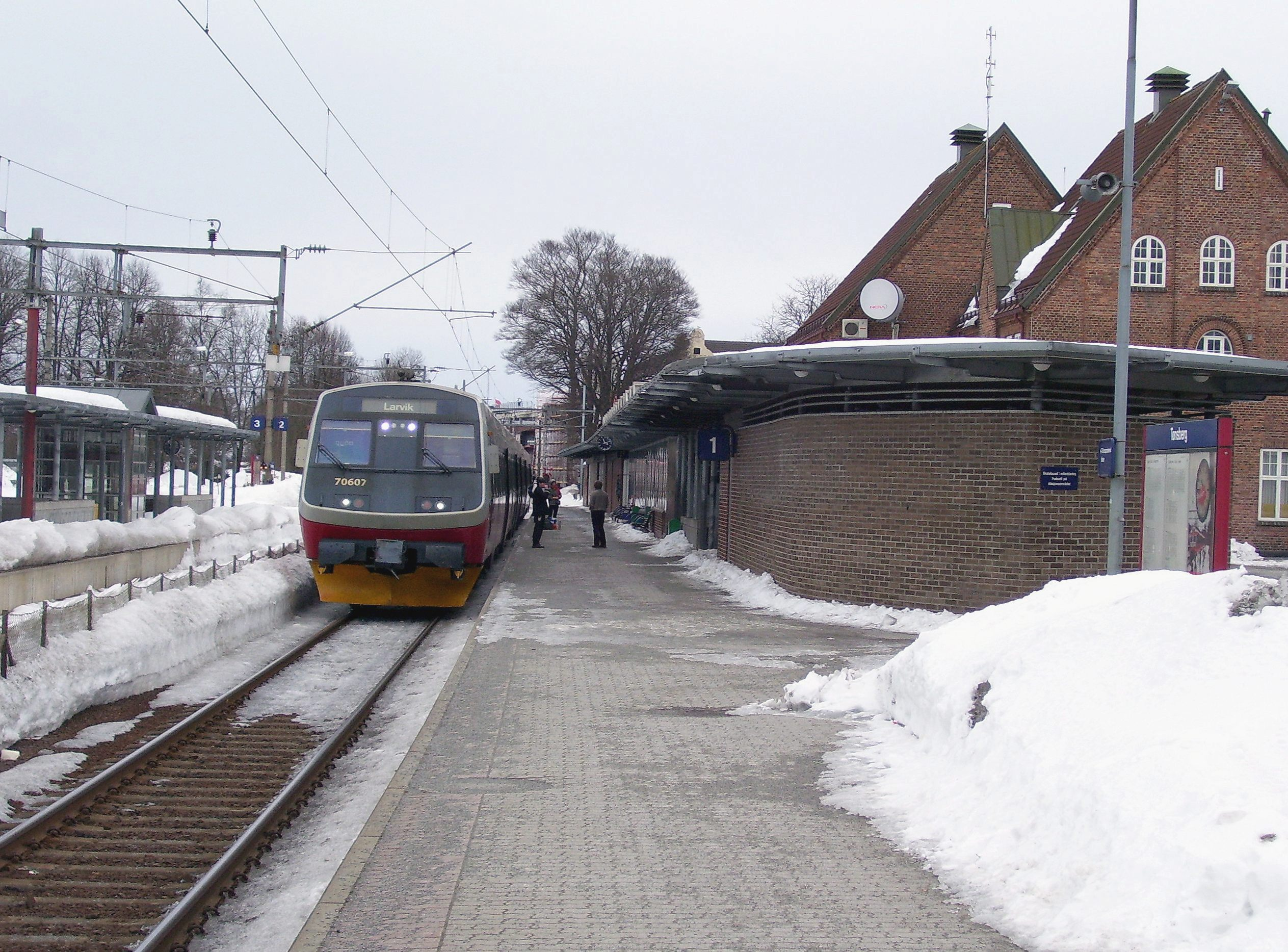
- A Class 70 train at the station

General information
- Location: Town of Tønsberg, Tønsberg Municipality; Norway
- Coordinates: 59°16′19″N 10°24′34″E
- Elevation: 14.5 m (48 ft)
- Owner: Bane NOR
- Operator: Vy
- Line: Vestfold Line
- Distance: 115.68 km (71.88 mi)
- Connections: Bus: VKT

History
- Opened: 1915
Location

Tønsberg Station on the Vestfold Line, is the main railway station in the town of Tønsberg in Tønsberg Municipality in Vestfold county, Norway. The station is located in the downtown area, to the east of the hill Slottsfjellet. It is located at an altitude of 14.5 meters (48 ft) above mean sea level, and is 115.68 kilometers (71.88 mi) from Oslo Central Station. The current station is from 1915.

== History ==
The first station at Knapløkken was a railway station built by the private Tønsberg–Eidsfoss Line. It received a station building of the smallest type used on the line, with only two rooms, and consisted further of a passing loop and an outhouse. The station had an extensive track arrangement with seven tracks and place for 203 freight cars. The station opened on 18 October 1901.

During the planning of TEB there was discussion about changing the state railway's line through town and building a new station. This would have allowed NSB trains avoid having to back from Jarlsberg Points. TEB therefore chose to build their station at Knapløkken. Thus Tønsberg was served by four stations. NSB therefore decided that it would build the Vestfold Line through Tønsberg in a loop, build a new, common station for TEB and NSB, and align the Vestfold Line out of Tønsberg next to TEB. As TEB's station was far too small to handle NSB's traffic, an all-new station was built at Knapløkken. The new line was taken into use on 1 October 1915 and the new station was completed in 1916.

At the time of the opening the station had 1 hectare (2.5 acres) of land, which was rented for 1 øre per square meter to the station employees. At the time of the opening the station had a station master, three clerks, six telegraphists, two foremen, a switcher, nine servicemen and an apprentice. On 11 May 1934, Norsk Spisevognselskap took over operation of the station restaurant. In 1948, a separate building for the restaurant was opened.

When the Vestfold Line first opened in 1881, Tønsberg was accessed to by means of a branch line running in a 221 meters (725 ft) long tunnel through Slottsfjell. At that time the Tønsberg station was a terminal station and trains had to reverse direction in Tønsberg, usually the cars were pushed into the station. This was a cumbersome operation, and in 1915 the current layout was opened. Now trains from the east run in a loop around Tønsberg city before entering the station and no reversing is necessary.

The loop does take up space however, and in 2002 the Tønsberg city council passed a resolution to replace the loop with a single line, reintroducing the simple cul-de-sac station. The Norwegian National Rail Administration, who owns the railway, protested, pointing out that turning trains around would hold it up for ten minutes. There have been calls to continue the discussion.

== Facilities ==
Tønsberg was built as a first-class station, the station's upper story originally serving as a residence for the station master and offices which hosted TEB's administration. The ground floor consisted of a waiting room, ticket sales, office for the station master, a telegraphy room, a cargo handling room, all with central heating. The station building was originally supplemented with a cargo building. The station had four main tracks, three spurs and a branch to the port, which was part of TEB.

Preceding station			Following station
Stokke	Vestfold Line		Skoppum
Preceding station	Regional trains		Following station
Stokke	RE11	Skien–Oslo S–Eidsvoll	Skoppum
