= Vestfold Line =

Railway line in Norway

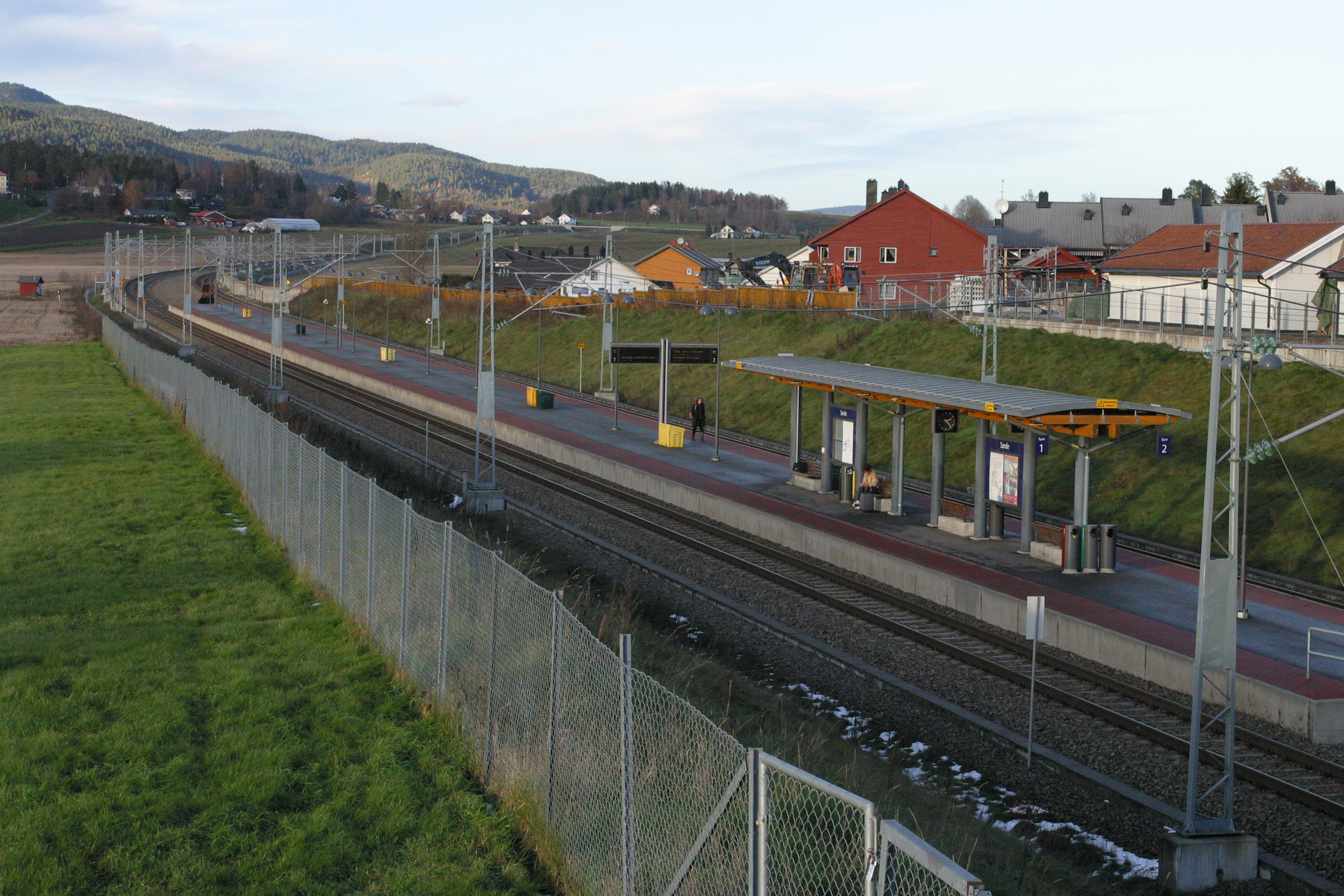
- Sande Station is located on one of the double-tracked sections

Overview
- Native name: Vestfoldbanen
- Owner: Bane NOR
- Termini: Drammen Station; Skien Station
- Stations: 13

Service
- Type: Railway
- System: Norwegian railway
- Operator: Vy
- Rolling stock: Class 70 and 74

History
- Opened: 13 October 1881

Technical
- Line length: 138 km (86 mi)
- Number of tracks: Single and double
- Character: Regional passenger
- Track gauge: 1,435 mm (4 ft 8 1/2 in)
- Electrification: 15 kV 16.7 Hz AC
- Operating speed: 200 km/h (125 mph)

The Vestfold Line (Norwegian: Vestfoldbanen) is a 137.79-kilometer (85.62 mi) railway line which runs between Drammen and Eidanger Station in Porsgrunn in Norway. The line connects to the Drammen Line at the northern terminus at Drammen Station and continues as the Bratsberg Line past Skien Station. The line is exclusively used for passenger trains, which are provided by Vy, which connect northwards to Oslo and south-westwards to Grenland. The 13-kilometer (8.1 mi) section from Eidanger to Skien is often colloquially included in the Vestfold Line. The standard gauge line is electrified at 15 kV 16.7 Hz AC and has twelve remaining stations. The Vestfold Line runs through the coastal region of Vestfold and serves major towns including Holmestrand, Tønsberg, Sandefjord and Larvik, as well as Sandefjord Airport, Torp.

The section to Larvik Station was opened on 13 October 1881 and the remainder, including an extension to Skien Station, opened on 23 November 1882. The line was originally variously known as the Drammen–Skien Line (Drammen–Skienbanen), the County Line (Grevskapsbanen) and the Jarlsberg Line (Jarlsbergbanen), until it became known as the Vestfold Line. Horten was served via the now closed 7-kilometer (4.3 mi) Horten Line from Skoppum Station. Three other branches were later built: the Brevik Line (1895), the Tønsberg–Eidsfoss Line (1901) and the Holmestrand–Vittingfoss Line (1902). The latter two were private and closed in 1938. The Vestfold Line received gauge conversion from the original narrow gauge 3 ft 6 in (1,067 mm) in 1949, as the last mainline railway in Norway. It was electrified in 1957.

Since the 1980s there have been plans to upgrade the line to high speed. The first section, at Skoger, opened in 1995. It was followed by a 13-kilometer (8.1 mi) section past Sande Station in 2001, a passing loop at Nykirke in 2002 and a 7 kilometers (4.3 mi) section including the Jarlsberg Tunnel in Tønsberg in 2011. In 2016 a new railway through Holmestrand, of which most is in the Holmestrandsporten tunnel, opened. In September 2018 a new double track line between Larvik and Porsgrunn opened, which shortened the travel-time from 33 to 12 minutes.

== Route ==
The Vestfold Line runs from Drammen Station to Eidanger Station, through three counties (Buskerud, Vestfold, and Telemark) and six municipalities (Drammen, Holmestrand, Horten, Tønsberg, Larvik, and Porsgrunn. The line is 137.79 kilometers (85.62 mi), of which 24 kilometers (15 mi) is double track. The entire line is electrified, has partial automatic train control and GSM-R. It has 111 level crossings, of which 29 have light and bar. The railway line is owned and maintained by the Norwegian National Rail Administration.

=== Drammen−Larvik ===
The route roughly follows the coastline of Oslofjorden whilst, concerning the first section, running from Drammen to Sande inland, bypassing thereby Oslofjords western finger Drammensfjorden. Holmestrandsporten tunnel between Holm i Sande and Nykirke (Horten Municipality) was opened in 2016 as part of a double-track high-speed upgrading. South of Nykirke, the route, again, crosses over into Tønsberg Municipality in a hinterland passage. Due to practical reasons (avoidance of a terminus), Tønsberg once got a big loop downtown without horseshoe curve function. The next segment to Larvik via Sandefjord runs inland, but never too far away from Skagerrak coastline. Before Larvik station, Numedalslågen is bridged.

=== Larvik−Porsgrunn−Skien ===
In 2018, the original single-track route between Farriselva (Larvik) at lake Farris and Porsgrunn (via Oklungen) was abandoned in favour of a newbuilt double-track high-speed bypass, using several tunnels and not-so-small bridges. Alongside Skienselva, Vestfold Line gets northward to Skien.

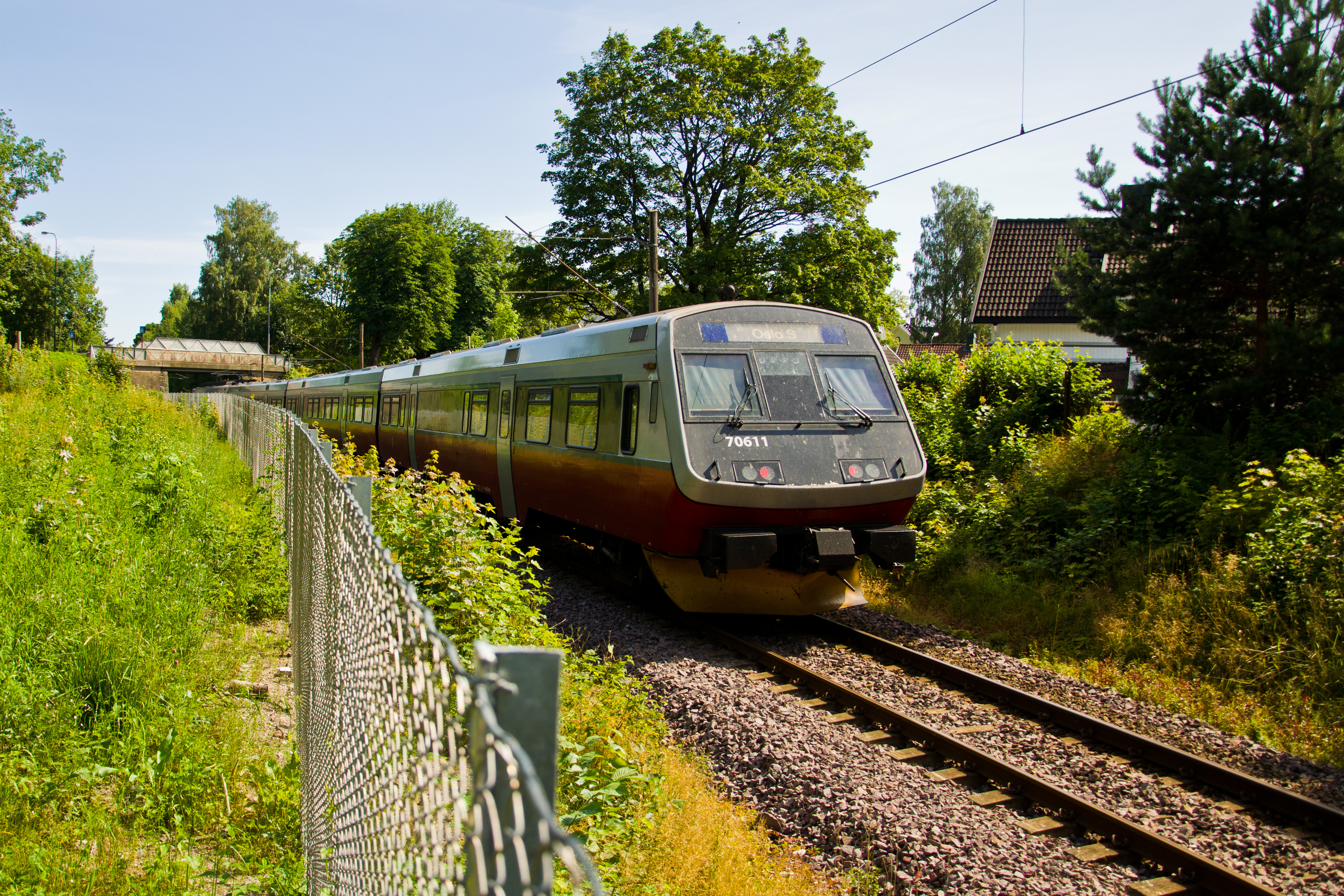
NSB Class 70 near Tønsberg

== Service ==
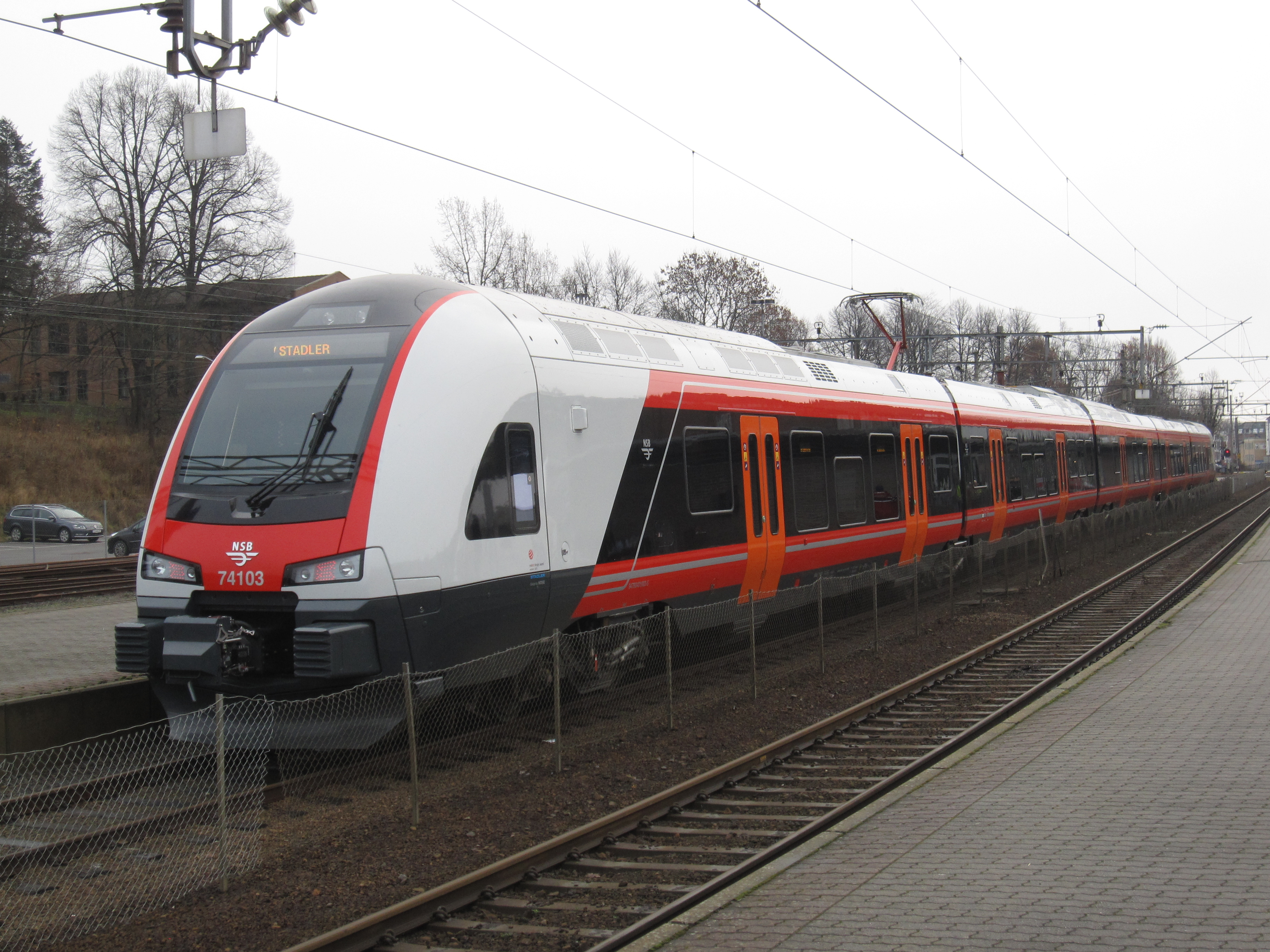
NSB Class 74 train at Tønsberg Station

Revenue traffic on the line is nearly exclusively provided by Vy as a regional service, numbered RE11. These continue southwards along the Bratsberg Line to Grenland towns of Porsgrunn and Skien and northwards along the Drammen and Asker Line to Oslo and onwards via the Gardermoen Line to Oslo Airport, Gardermoen and the Dovre Line to Lillehammer. Trains operate with a fixed hourly service, with additional trains during rush-hour.

Vy uses Class 70 and 74 electric multiple units on the line. NSB freighted 1.7 million passengers on the line in 2012, making it the busiest regional rail service provided by NSB. Vy provides an included shuttle service from Sandefjord Airport Station to Sandefjord Airport, Torp, which takes four minutes. The Vestfold Line is occasionally used by rerouted freight trains along the Sørlandet Line when that line is closed between Drammen and Nordagutu.

== History ==
=== Planning ===
Public opinion started debating the need for a railway through Vestfold in the late 1860s, when the Randsfjorden Line was built to Drammen, opening in 1868. The parliamentarians from Jarlsberg and Larvik County (renamed Vestfold in 1919) appealed to the government in 1869 for the construction of a railway through Vestfold south from Drammen to Larvik and onwards to Langefjorden. The request was positively accepted by the government, who instructed the railway director to carry out surveys through Vestfold, prioritizing it higher than the surveys through Østfold.

The country experienced an economic boom starting in 1871, with demands throughout the country for railways to be built. Official planning of a railway through Vestfold to Brevik commenced with a royal resolution on 24 July 1871. In addition to providing a regional rail service to Vestfold, a steamship service could be set up from Larvik to Frederikshavn, Denmark. There was also at the time problems with the inner parts of the Oslofjord and the Drammensfjord icing during winter, and access to the ports on the outer fjord would ease the export situation for industry.

There were a multitude of proposals for where the railway should run. The only points of agreement were that the line should run through Tønsberg, Sandefjord and Larvik, and the line between the three towns was the least controversial. North of Tønsberg there was more disunity. One proposal was to run the railway from Vestfossen Station on the Kongsberg Line along the east shore of Eikeren and down to Tønsberg along a route similar to that which the Tønsberg–Eidsfoss Line would later follow. A branch line would then be built to Horten. This alternative allowed the line to run through an area with good access to lumber, which the railway would aid export. The main disadvantage was that the route was 20 kilometers (12 mi) longer than via Sande.

Alternatively a passage through Sande was proposed, although fourteen different routes were proposed. Three main ones were the inner, outer and combined coastal alternatives. The outer followed the shore of the Oslofjord, would be 111 kilometers (69 mi) and would run through Holmestrand, Horten and Åsgårdstrand before reaching Tønsberg. The combined and inner would be 107 and 102 kilometers (66 and 63 mi), respectively, and both involved building a branch line to Horten. A major argument against the coastal route was that the towns already had a good steamship service, with services several daily departures. A third major alternative was to bypass the coast altogether and build a connection from the Kongsberg Line at Skollenborg Station down the valley of Lågendalen to Larvik. The main advantage of this alternative was the large potential for hydroelectricity along Numedalslågen.

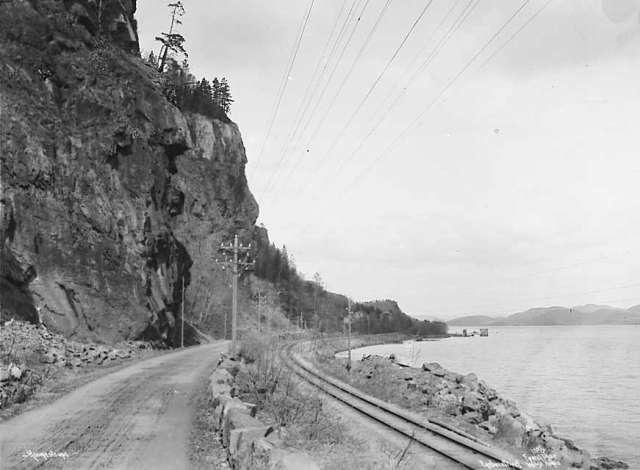
Section of the line near Holmestrand in 1902

Jarlsberg and Larvik County Council and the town councils appointed a railway committee, which asked the county governor on 27 November 1873 to issue shares in the new railway. The county bought shares worth 400,000 Norwegian krone (NOK). Shares for a coastal railway were bought for NOK 4.9 million, twice that of the interior route. The coastal route was expected to pay a dividend of three to four percent, compared to two and a half percent for the interior. Ahead of the county council meeting in December 1873 the county governor recommended that an application be sent to the government without a preferred route, but the majority of the county council's members voted in favor the interior alternative.

At the time the railway was variously referred to as the County Line and the Jarlsberg Line, both named for the historic countship of Jarlsberg. By 1874 the state railway commission had considered the line and had concluded that it should be built with narrow gauge. Only its chair, Professor Broch, voted in favor of standard gauge, and at the same time recommended that the Drammen Line be converted to the wider gauge. The advantage of 3 ft 6 in (1,067 mm) narrow gauge was that it would cut construction costs by a third. By then the railway director, Carl Abraham Pihl, had concluded in disfavor of the Vestfold Line and had instead wanted to prioritize the Østfold Line. His view was shared by the cabinet. The break-through came when plans to extend the line onwards to Skien were launched. Pihl estimated the 45-kilometer (28 mi) extension to cost NOK 4.5 million, in addition to a possible branch to Brevik.

The construction of the line was considered by Parliament in 1875. A political deal was struck, where representatives from the Vestfold area agreed to support the Voss Line while representatives from Hordaland supported the Jarlsberg Line. The decision, taken on 8 June 1875, was made with 76 against 36 votes, and supported the compromise coastal route with an extension to Skien. The line was budgeted to cost NOK 10.7 million, and shares of NOK 3.25 million had been sold.

=== Construction ===
Construction commenced in 1876, under the management of Pihl, Cato Maximilian Guldberg and Jørgen Meinich. The line received a minimum curve radius of 180 meters (590 ft) and a maximum gradient of 1:55 (1.8%). The work was attempted halted twice in 1877 by parties issuing complaints. The first stated that the right-of-way should be built in preparation for conversion to standard gauge, the latter was an attempt to stall construction and instead place the route through the interior. Engineer Størmer launched a proposal in 1878 to instead build the line with standard gauge. This was considered by Parliament's Standing Committee on Railways, but voted down with five against four votes. The proposal was voted down in the plenary voting, with only 24 supporting standard gauge.

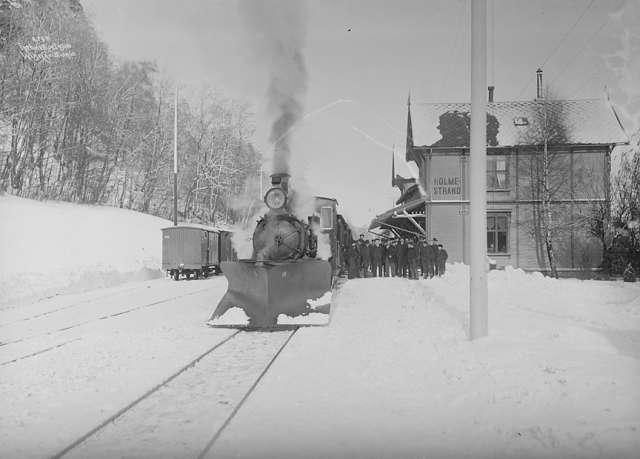
Holmestrand Station in 1902

There were few difficulties building the line in the relatively flat landscape between Drammen and Larvik. The largest challenge was building through Kobbervikdalen. The navvies were uncomfortable building a cutting south of Holmestrand, where the line went through an old cemetery in clay ground and they would often find well-preserved corpses while digging. The section between Larvik and Skien went through considerably more hilly terrain, especially along the shore of Farrisvannet, which included more than twenty tunnels along a section of 15 kilometers (9.3 mi). At the peak, in 1879, there were 2,114 people working on the railway construction, receiving an average NOK 2.50 per day in wage.

Because King Oscar II happened to be touring Norway in October 1881, the railway between Drammen and Larvik was officially opened by him on 13 October 1881, including the branch to Horten. However, the construction was not completed and the line did not actually start operations until 7 December. The section from Larvik to Skien was officially opened on 24 November 1882. Construction cost NOK 12 million. The Brevik Line was taken out of the original plans and did not open until 15 October 1895.

=== Narrow-gauge years ===
The Vestfold Line was organized as part of the Norwegian State Railways' Drammen District. At first the line was trafficked with two daily combined passenger and freight trains in each direction, in addition to a freight services on weekdays. The most important train was the post train, a combined post and passenger express which departed Oslo West Station at 08 hours and returned from Skien at 15 hours. It used the newest rolling stock NSB had available. At Skoppum there was a corresponding local train to Horten. From the opening of the Brevik Line in 1895, local trains started running between Brevik and Skien, and an additional daily express train was set up run to Brevik, where there was a corresponding steamship service to Kristiansand.

NSB took delivery of five Class V steam locomotives, manufactured by Motala Verkstad and four lager tender Class XI locomotive built by Dübs & Company. The latter were mostly used for the express trains. The first compound locomotive, Class XIII, was taken into use in 1895. The next two were not compound: two Baldwin Locomotive Works locomotives were delivered in 1898. They remained in service until 1908, when they were transferred to the Røros Line. Two Class IX from Swiss Locomotive & Machine Works units were transferred to the Vestfold Line in 1897. Two more Class XIII were delivered in 1900. Two Class XXIIIa locomotives were delivered from Hamar Jernstøperi in 1907 and 1908, with a further ten Class XXIIId units delivered from Thune between 1913 and 1915. The line later received various other steam locomotives as narrow gauge railways were converted to standard gauge.

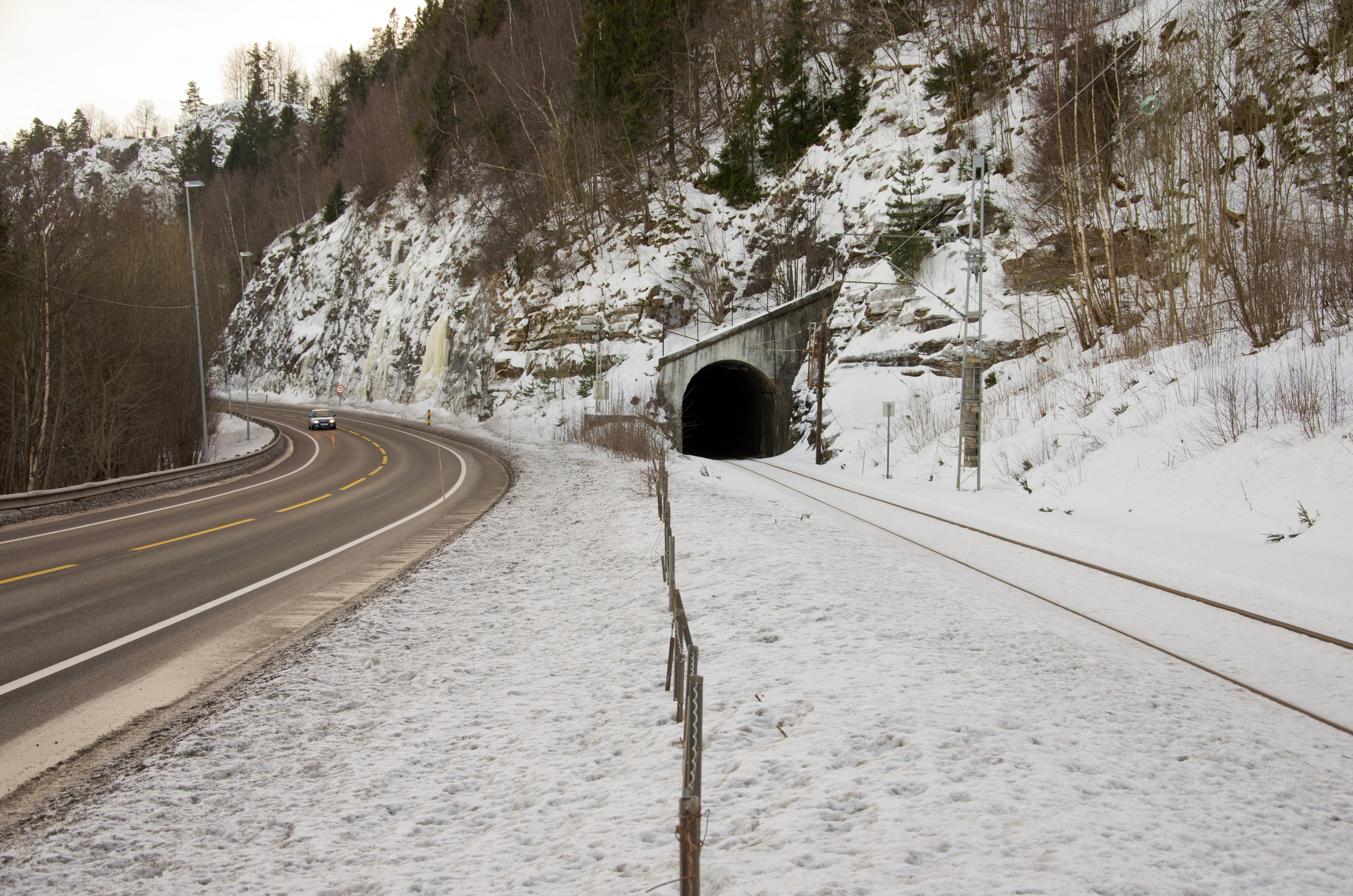
Smørstein Tunnel

During construction of a level crossing at Smørstein on 17 August 1918 the area around the track started experiencing a series of landslides. Within a few days the earthwork under the tracks had slid away. NSB hired a steamship to freight passengers and cargo past the effected area, and part of the traffic was freighted across the fjord from Horten to Moss. A temporary line was built close to the mountain, while construction took place of a temporary solution, the Smørstein Tunnel. The temporary line opened on 28 October 1918 and the new segment with a tunnel on 25 May 1921.

The Jarlsberg Line officially changed its name to the Vestfold Line on 1 July 1930. It received thirty-eight new stops in the period between 1928 and 1932.

=== Gauge conversion ===
The county council debated conversion of the line to standard gauge in 1910, and issued a request to the government. It considered the question in 1912, and granted funding for preliminary surveys. After petitioning from most municipal councils and various commercial interests in 1913, Parliament agreed to the funding in April 1914. A railway committee was established, and Drammen District proposed that its lines be converted. By the time the issue had reached Parliament in 1923, a conversion of the Vestfold Line had fallen out of the plans. However, several of the surrounding railways were converted to standard gauge.

The Drammen Line was converted to dual gauge between 1917 and 1920, and then only standard gauge from 13 November 1922. The Drammen Line was electrified in two stages, in 1922 and 1930. The Bratsberg Line opened between Notodden and Skien in 1917, and the section of the Vestfold Line from Skien to Eidanger was converted to dual gauge. From 16 June 1921 the line, including the branch to Brevik, was entirely standard gauge. This caused the trains from Skien and Porsgrunn to be re-routed via the Bratsberg Line from Kongsvinger to Oslo.

Trains on the Vestfold Line therefore terminated at Drammen, where passengers had to transfer to the Drammen Line. The low standard became a local political concern. The road director proposed closing the railway and building a highway, but the proposal met little support. A propaganda committee was established in 1931, which in addition to gauge conversion insisted on that the line be rebuilt so it ran via Horten. Parliament voted in favor on 26 June 1934 of converting the Vestfold Line. However, with the German occupation of Norway between 1940 and 1945, the Vestfold Line received a low priority and was hardly maintained. A new decision to convert the gauge was taken by Parliament in March 1946.

In 1949 there were twenty-one various versions of Class XXIII and two Class XXVI locomotives used on the Vestfold Line. New 25 kilograms per meter track were installed. However, the foundation was not resized to suit standard gauge. Between 170 and 240 men were employed and the works cost NOK 41 million. The gauge-converted railway, including the Horten Line, was taken into use on 3 October 1949. The Vestfold Line was the last railway in Norway to receive gauge conversion. Most of the remaining narrow gauge rolling stock was therefore sold to Sweden.

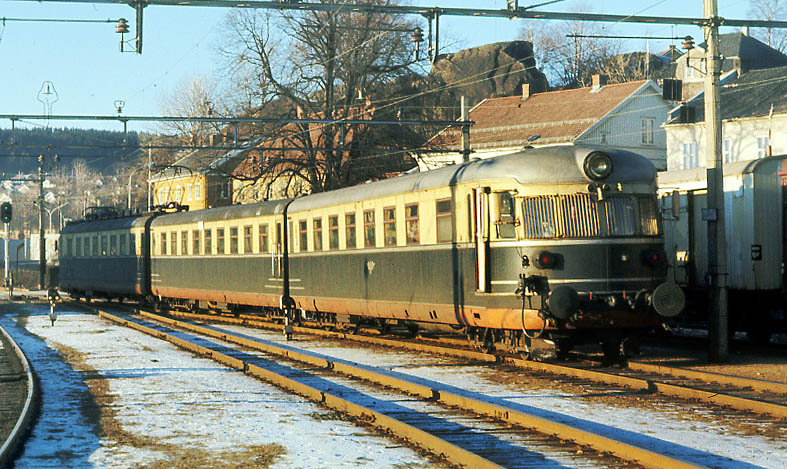
Class 66 train at Larvik Station in 1971

=== Electrification ===
The Bratsberg and Brevik Line were electrified before the Vestfold Line, between 1936 and 1949. Electrification of the Vestfold Line took place in three segments. First the segment from Eidanger to Larvik was taken into use on 15 October 1956, then the segment from Larvik to Tønsberg on 20 May 1957 and finally the segment from Tønsberg to Drammen on 1 December 1957. NSB reallocated most and later all of their El 8 locomotives to Drammen District, resulting in them being frequently used on the Vestfold Line. Class 66 multiple units were introduced on the Vestfold Line on 28 May 1967. They ran on trains to Skien until 3 June 1973, after which it only served to Larvik. They were retired on 21 May 1977. El 11 locomotives were used on the Vestfold Line from the 1970s. From the late 1970s and early 1980s, these were replaced with El 13.

Centralized traffic control was introduced in steps during the early 1970s. The section from Drammen to Holmestrand received it on 16 December 1970, the section onwards to Tønsberg on 1 July 1971, the section onwards to Sandefjord on 15 September 1971, the section onwards to Larvik on 27 October 1971, the section onwards to Porsgrunn on 16 December 1971. The port tracks in Holmestrand and Tønsberg were closed in 1980.

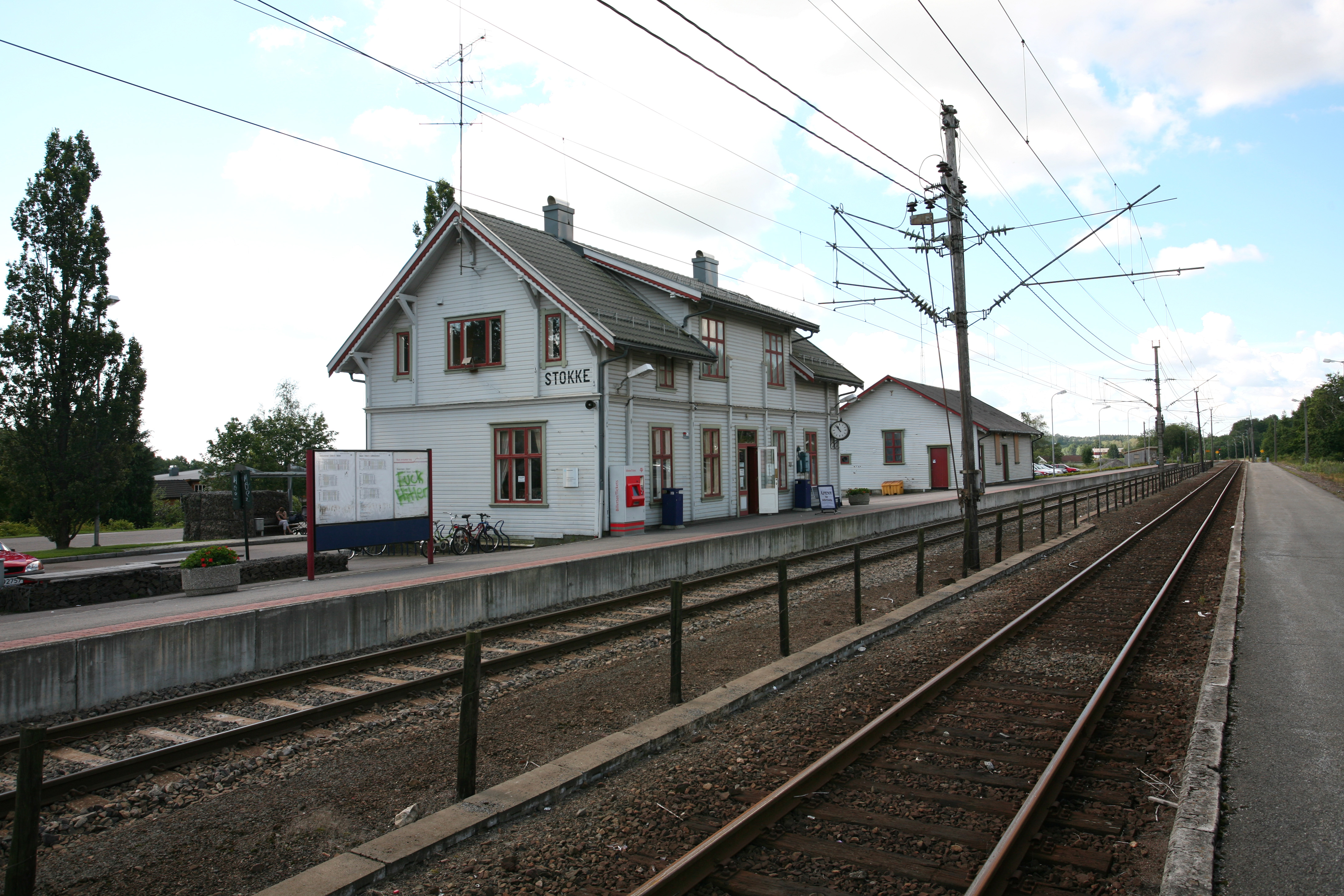
Stokke Station

A major change to the service on the Vestfold Line took place on 29 May 1978, when all smaller stations were closed. NSB introduced its new InterCityExpress concept, which resulted in an increase of patronage by twenty-five percent on the Vestfold Line. From 30 May 1980 the Oslo Tunnel opened, and trains from the Vestfold Line could terminate at Oslo East Station and continue onwards to Lillehammer. The same year a commuter association was started for the Vestfold Line. With the delivery of new B5 carriages, NSB was able to put additional B3 carriages in to use on the Vestfold Line. Automatic train stop was installed from Drammen to Larvik on 18 July 1990 and from Larvik to Skien on 28 November 1991.

=== High-speed ===
The first stages of modernization of the Vestfold Line were carried out through a combination of new trains and sections of double track. NSB ordered of the Class 70 trains for their InterCityExpress services in 1988. Capable of speeds of 160 km/h (99 mph), they were introduced on the Vestfold Line in 1992. The new trains increased capacity on the Vestfold Line with 2,100 seats per day. NSB soon found that the four-car trains had an unsuitable size: a single unit did not provide sufficient capacity while two units provided too much capacity. Despite the upgrades, by 1997 the trains from Larvik to Oslo were using twenty minutes longer than they were in 1973, and the average speed on the Vestfold Line was down to 65 km/h (40 mph).

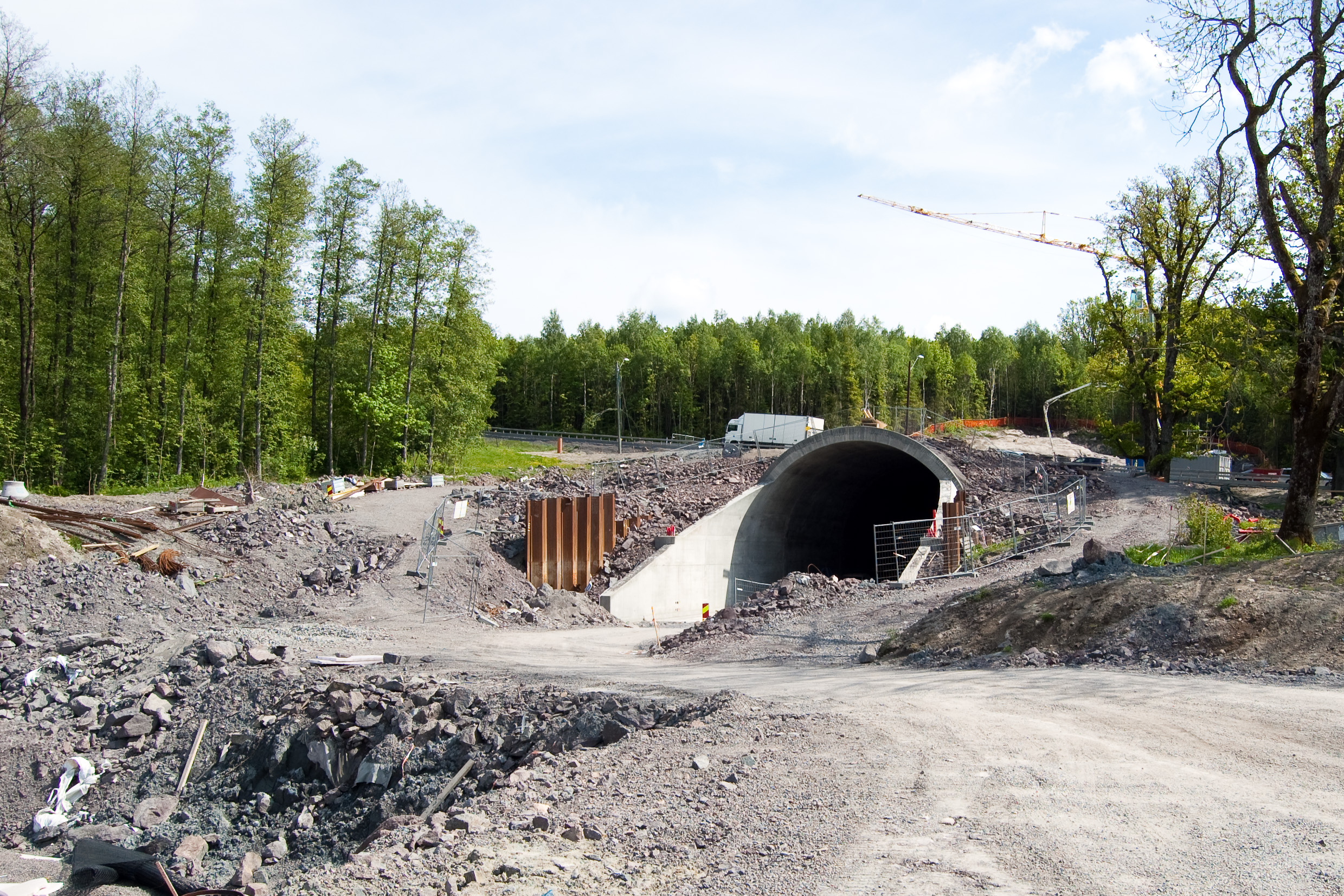
Construction of the Jarlsberg Tunnel in 2010

Starting work in 1993, the first two section of the Vestfold Line to be upgraded were a 4.5-kilometer (2.8 mi) double track segment from Kobbervikdalen to Skoger, and a 12.5 kilometers (7.8 mi) segment from Åshaugen via a new Sande Station to Holm. The Skoger section opened in on 17 October 1995, while the section past Sande did not open until 23 October 2001. Part of the reason for five-year delay with the second segment was delays with the installation of the signaling system which was being carried out by Adtranz.

In September 1999, the government presented their proposal for National Transport Plan 2002–11, which included three segments on the Vestfold Line: Holm–Nykirke, Barkåker–Tønsberg and Farriseidet–Porsgrunn. When Parliament passed the plan in February 2001, the Barkåker–Tønsberg segment was prioritized second on the Vestfold Line, after a new passing loop at Nykirke. The passing loop was completed in 2002, the same year as all traffic on the Horten Line was terminated. Råstad Station reopened as Sandefjord Airport Station on 21 January 2007, serving Sandefjord Airport, Torp. This allowed the Vestfold Line to act as an airport rail link to Sandefjord Airport, Torp, which had during the 1990s grown as both a regional airport and as a low-cost airport for Ryanair.

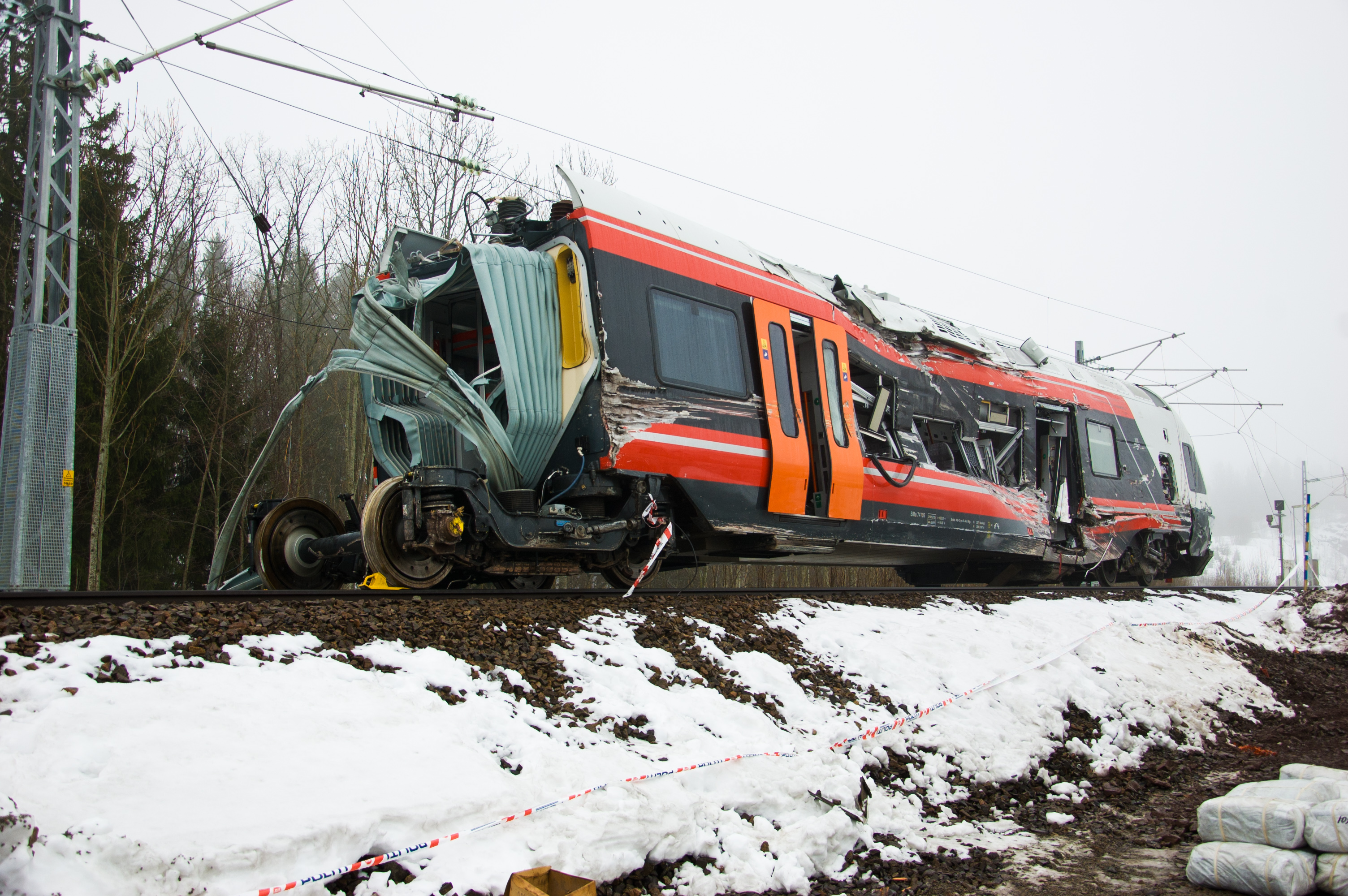
Wreckage of a Class 74 train which derailed at Nykirke during trial runs on 15 February 2012

National Transport Plan 2002–11 proposed that construction start in 2005, but by November 2002, the National Rail Administration delayed the plans, following investment cuts by Bondevik's Second Cabinet. In response, Minister of Transport Torild Skogsholm stated that she was considering financing the project as a public–private partnership paid through a surcharge on tickets fares. Increased funding to railways commenced with the appointment of Stoltenberg's Second Cabinet in 2005. The go-ahead for the 7.7-kilometer (4.8 mi) Barkåker–Tønsberg section, including the Jarlsberg Tunnel, was given by Minister of Transport Liv Signe Navarsete on 31 March 2008, estimated to cost 1.37 billion Norwegian krone (NOK).

The plan to make an isolated investment in the Barkåker–Tønsberg section was criticized by several pro-railway interest organizations, including NSB, which instead recommended that the National Rail Administration place the investments on hold until more of the Vestfold Line was planned. The short segment gives little operational advantages, while hindering a new line from running via the population centers of Horten, Åsgårdstrand and Eik. Construction of the project started on 16 March 2009, and opened on schedule on 7 November 2011. By then NSB had taken delivery of its new Class 74 units, which were put into service on the Vestfold Line. During trial runs a Class 74 unit derailed at Nykirke. The train was totaled, although no-one was seriously injured in the incident.

== Architecture ==
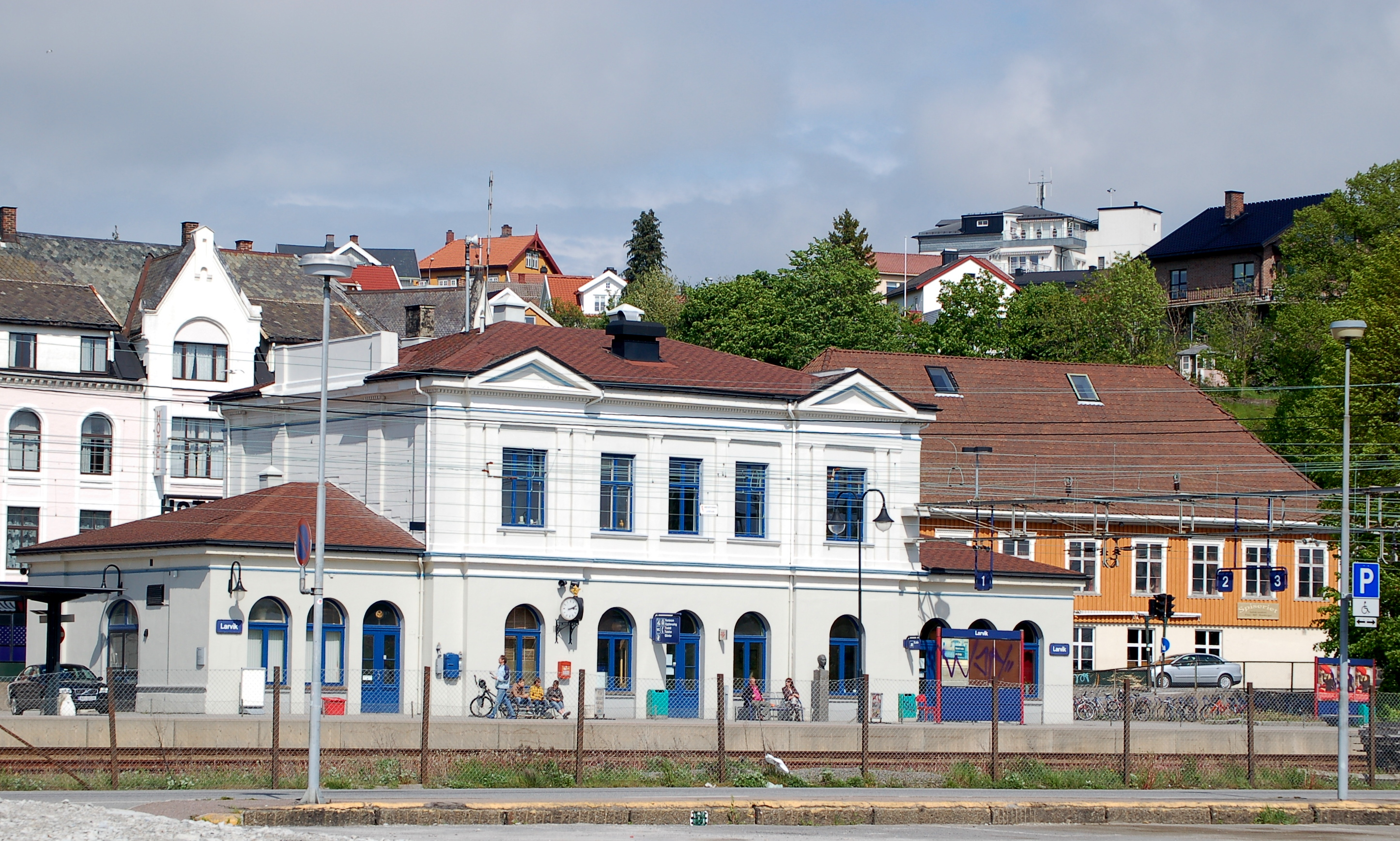
Larvik Station

Balthazar Lange was selected as the line's main architect, although some minor buildings were standardized designs by Peter Andreas Blix. Lange worked on the various plans from late 1879 until July 1882, when he retired as a railway architect. He first designed three similar, town stations: Holmestrand, Sandefjord and Porsgrunn. Designed in Swiss chalet style, they each featured gablets in each end, on both the track and town side. The ends were more anonymous. The design gave a non-symmetrical feel around the end axis, with the town side appearing in two stories and the track side as one and a half. Holmestrand and Sandefjord have both been extensively rebuilt. The stations were smaller and cheaper with resemblance of Blix' contemporary Moss Station and Fredrikstad Station on the Østfold Line, across the fjord.

The only brick stations were Tønsberg Station and Larvik Station, designed in Historicism and Renaissance Revival. In addition to these stations' size, it was decisive that local building restrictions banned wooden buildings. The two stations had the same floor plan and design, but Larvik was slightly longer. Their design was inspired from the main farmhouses of Jarlsberg and Larvik. The stations were innovative for their design with a central vestibule with direct access to both the town and track sides, with branches to waiting rooms for second and third class. They were also innovative in that the upper floor, with the station-master's residence, was smaller than the ground floor.

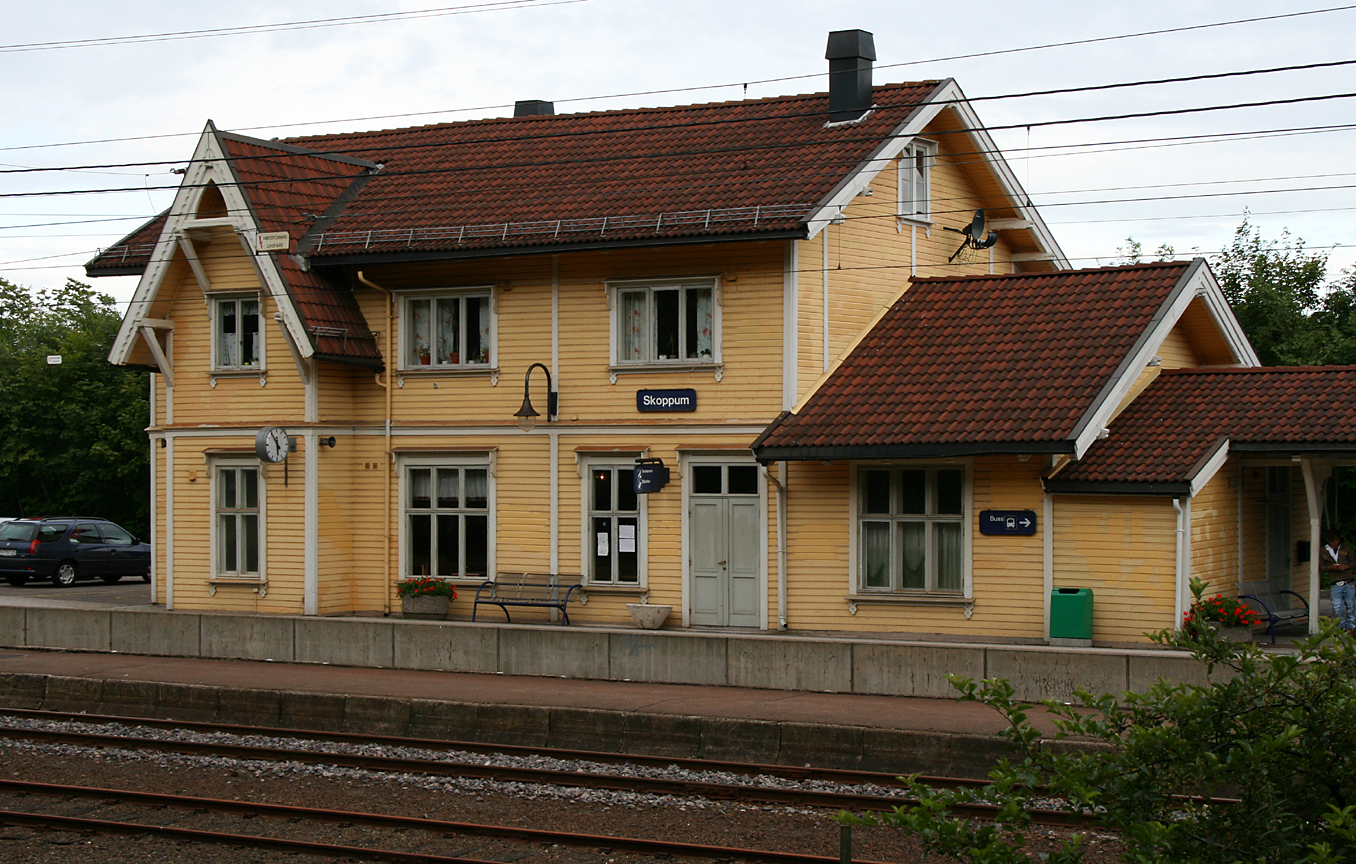
Skoppum Station

Skoppum Station, where the Horten Line branched off, was given an island platform design, with the station located between the two tracks. This, and the need for space for transshipment, gave the station an odd design, and the island location gave it difficult access from the surroundings. Six stations have been listed by the Directorate for Cultural Heritage: Skoppum, Tønsberg, Stokke, Råstad, the goods house at Sandefjord, the engine shed at Larvik Station, Eidanger Station and Borgestad Station.

== Future ==
The Vestfold Line is part of the Intercity Triangle, which the authorities wish to prioritize for future upgrades. The long-term goal is to construct a continuous high-speed double track from Oslo to Skien. This is in part a response to the E18 being upgraded to a motorway. In addition to increased speeds, the current line does not allow for more trains to operate. Plans call for an initial construction of the Inner Intercity Triangle, which will give continual double track from Tønsberg to Oslo, in addition to the shortening of the segment between Larvik and Porsgrunn. This will allow travel time from Tønsberg to Oslo to be reduced from 1 hour and 28 minutes to 1 hour. An upgrade of the rest of the line, scheduled for completion by 2030, will cut travel time from Porsgrunn to Oslo from 2 hours and 45 minutes to 1 hour and 36 minutes. The line could accommodate an estimated 9.5 million passengers per year, and each station could receive between 100 and 500 percent increase in patronage. Despite the plans for the upgrades of the Vestfold Line, there are no current plans for upgrading the 15-kilometer (9.3 mi) line and tunnel between Asker and Drammen, which all trains must follow to Oslo and which has a maximum speed of 130-kilometre-per-hour (81 mph).

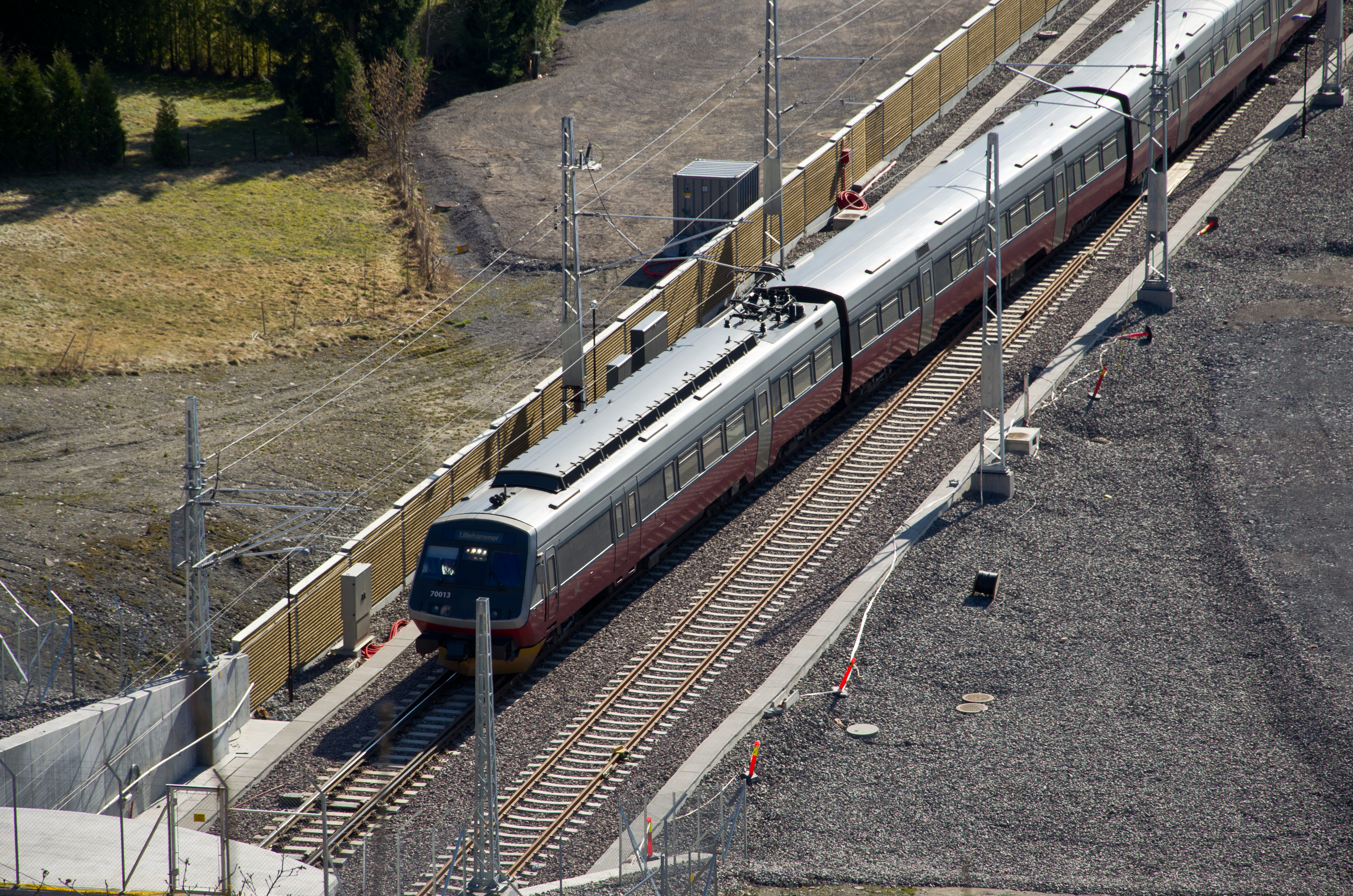
NSB Class 70 on the double-track section between the Jarlsberg Tunnel and Tønsberg Station

Construction of the 14.1-kilometer (8.8 mi) section of double track between Holm and Nykirke commenced on 16 August 2010. The segment will connect the passing loop at Nykirke and the double-tracked segment through Sande, giving a combined length of 32 kilometers (20 mi) of high-speed double track. Designed for speeds of 250 km/h (160 mph), the new segment will feature the 12.3-kilometer (7.6 mi) Holmestrandfjellet Tunnel, which will contain the four-track Holmestrand Station. The segment is estimated to cost NOK 5.7 billion and is scheduled for completion in 2016.

The 35-kilometer (22 mi) section of railway which runs between Farriseidet and Porsgrunn is in the process of being replaced with a new, high-speed 23.5-kilometer (14.6 mi) section. It will reduce travel time between Larvik Station and Porsgrunn Station from 34 to 12 minutes. Originally planned as single track with two passing loops, it was upped to double track with surveys showing increased traffic should the Sørlandet Line be connected to the Vestfold Line with the construction of a proposed Grenland Line. The segment includes seven tunnels with a combined length of 14.5 kilometers (9.0 mi) and five bridges. Municipal zoning of the segment was passed in July 2010, with construction commencing in September 2012. Construction is estimated to cost NOK 5.3 billion and is scheduled for completion in 2018.

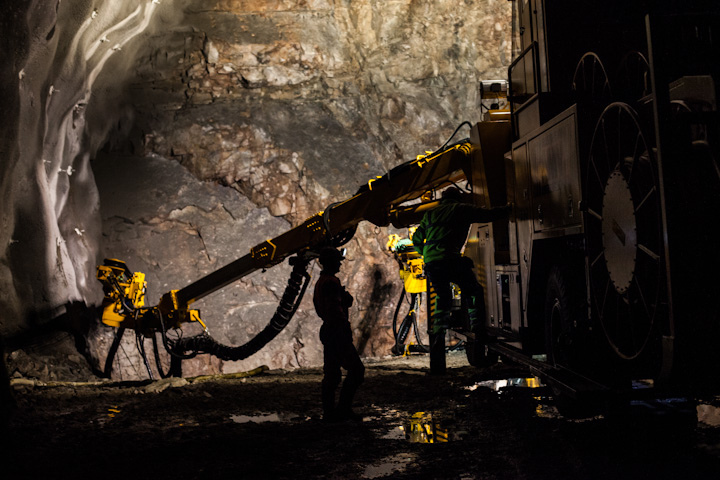
Blasting in the Holmestrandfjellet Tunnel

There are proposals to connect the Vestfold Line with the Sørlandet Line via a new Grenland Line. It would connect to the Vestfold Line just north of Porsgrunn Station and would run 59 kilometers (37 mi) from Porsgrunn to Skorstøl on the Sørlandet Line. The line is estimated to cost NOK 20-26 billion and would allow the travel time from Kragerø to Oslo of 2 hours and from Kristiansand to Oslo in 3 hours and 23 minutes. Passenger trains along the Sørlandet Line, and possibly freight trains, would be routed via the Vestfold Line. It is therefore necessary to complete the upgrade of the Vestfold Line before the Grenland Line is opened.

There are plans to build a new road crossing of the Oslofjord between Horten and Moss, which would replace the Moss–Horten Ferry. It could include a connection of the Vestfold Line with the Østfold Line. One alternative was a suspension bridge across Drøbaksundet, which could be built to accommodate trains and feature a main span of 1,300 and 1,500 meters (4,300 and 4,900 ft). A bridge or tunnel crossing further south would require more advanced technology and presumably consist of combination of various bridge technologies, including as a pontoon bridge or a submerged floating tunnel.

The Norwegian National Transport Plan for 2018–2029 states that one of the priorities for the railway system is to establish a continuous double track between Oslo and Tønsberg by the end of 2024, and a completed double track all the way to Skien in 2032.
