= Anne Rygh Pedersen =

Norwegian politician (born 1967)

Anne Rygh Pedersen (born 28 June 1967) is a Norwegian politician. She is a member of the Labour Party.

She served in the position of deputy representative to the Norwegian Parliament from Vestfold during the term 2001–2005. Rygh Pedersen was the county mayor of Vestfold 2003–2005. When the second cabinet Stoltenberg assumed office following the 2005 elections, she was appointed State Secretary in the Ministry of Justice and the Police. Rygh Pedersen resigned om February 9, 2007.

She was mayor of the new Tønsberg Municipality from 2020 to 2023.

She now lives in Tønsberg and has a son.

Preceded by	County mayor of Vestfold; 2003–2005	Succeeded by
