= Holmestrandsporten =

Double track railway tunnel in Vestfold, Norway

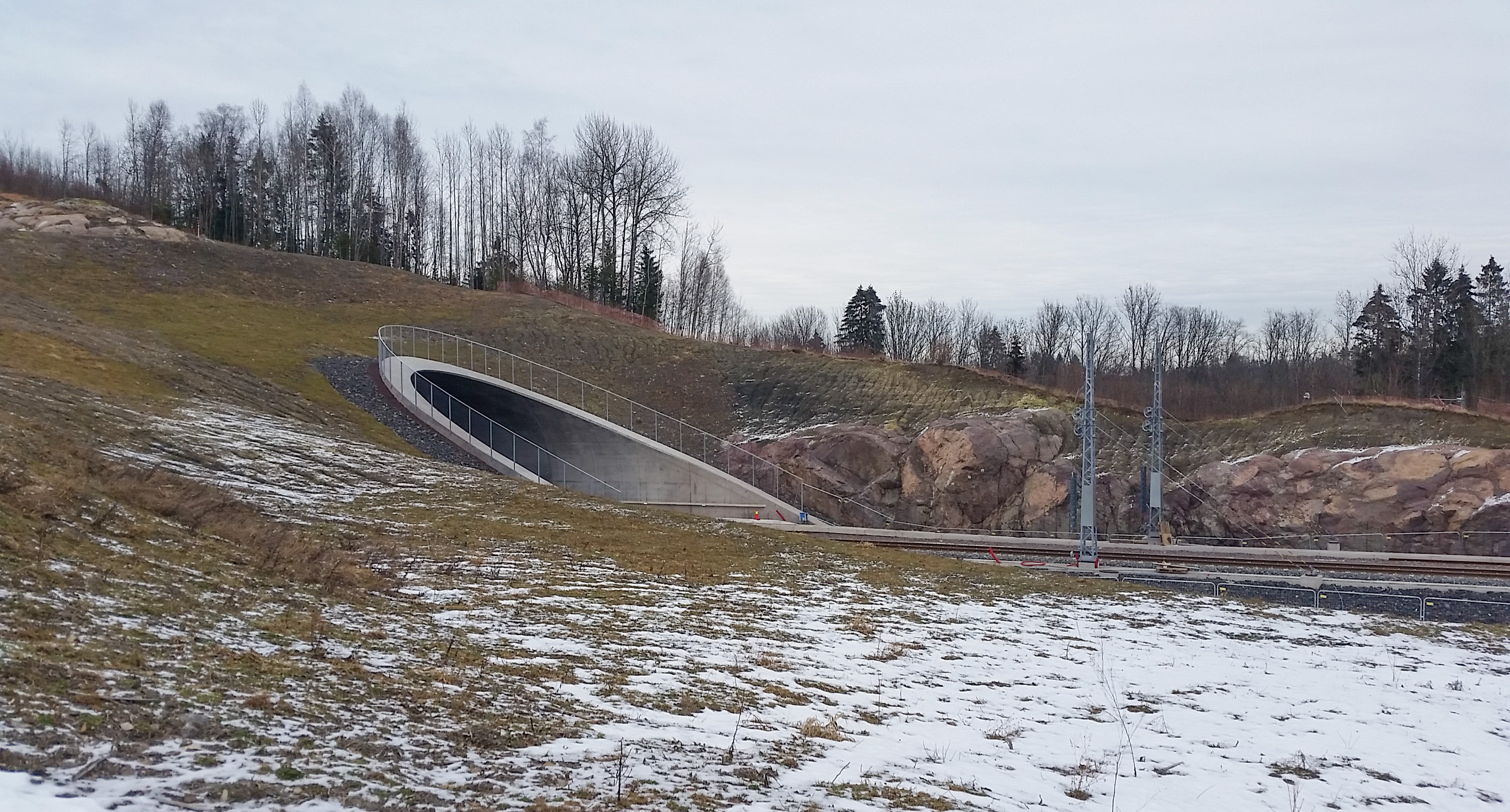
- Southern entrance, February 2016
- Interactive map of Holmestrandsporten

Overview
- Line: Vestfold Line
- Location: Holmestrandfjellet, Holmestrand, Norway
- Coordinates: 59.492046°N 10.310605°E
- Start: Holm, Sande
- End: Snekkestad, Re

Operation
- Opened: 2016
- Owner: Norwegian National Rail Administration

Technical
- Line length: 12,300 m (7.6 mi)
- No. of tracks: Double
- Track gauge: 1,435 mm (4 ft 8 1/2 in)
- Electrified: 15 kV 16.7 Hz AC
- Operating speed: 250 km/h (160 mph)

The Holmestrandsporten Tunnel (Holmestrandsporten) is a 12,300-meter (7.6 mi) long double track railway tunnel which runs through Holmestrandfjellet in Holmestrand and Tønsberg in Vestfold, Norway. It was opened for traffic on Monday 28 November 2016.

Located on the Vestfold Line, the tunnel was built as part of the 14.3-kilometer (8.9 mi) double-track high-speed segment from Holm to Nykirke. The new Holmestrand Station is located inside the mountain in the middle of the tunnel. The total cost of the project was estimated to be 6.6 billion Norwegian Kroner upon completion. The new tunnel reduces traveling time on the Vestfold Line by five minutes.

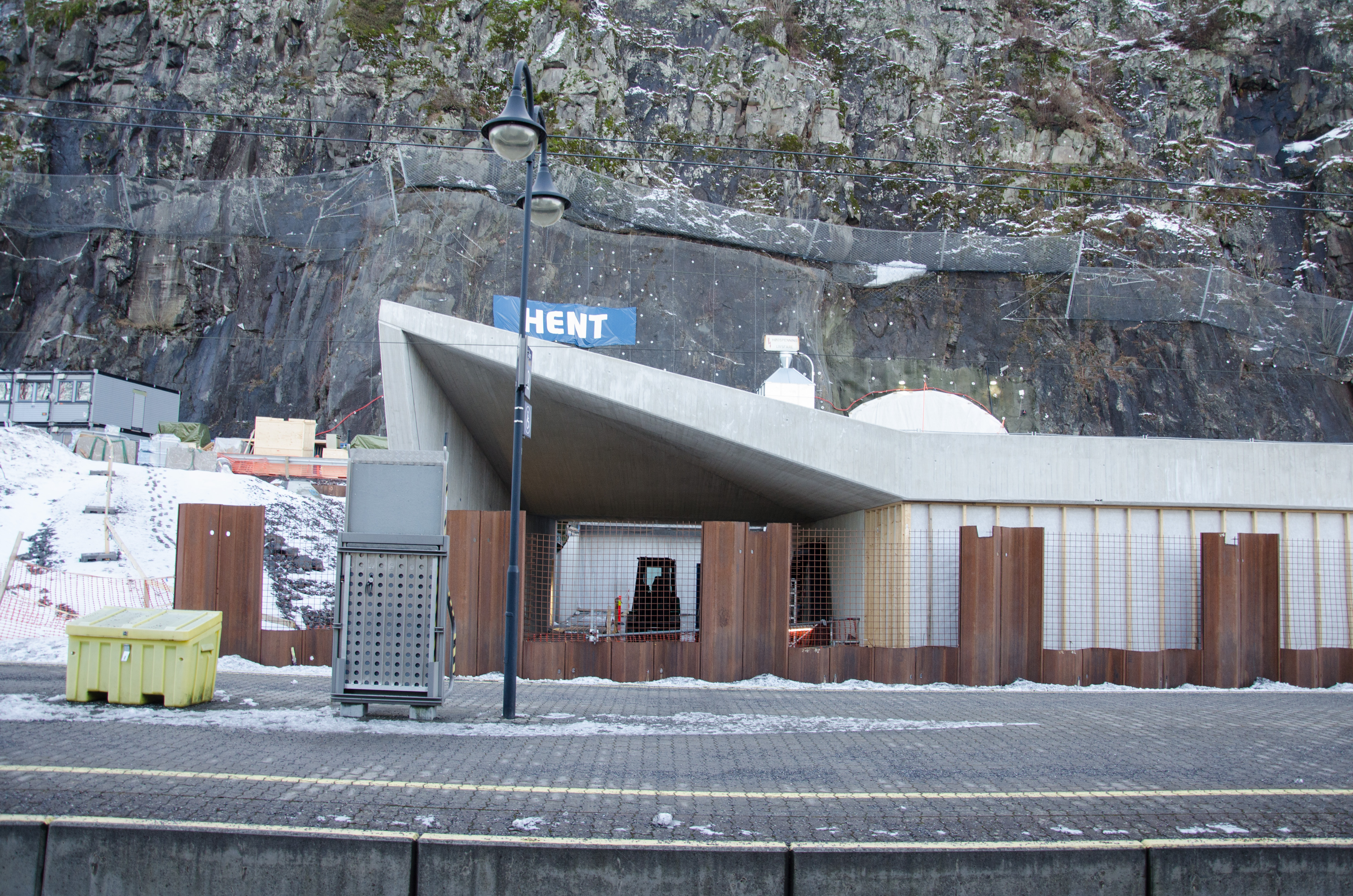
Holmestrand station, February 2016
