= Vestfold County Municipality =

Vestfold County Municipality Vestfold fylkeskommune
- County municipality
- Coat of arms

- Location in Norway
- Coordinates: 59°16′13″N 10°24′57″E
- Country: Norway
- Administrative center: Tønsberg

Government
  - County mayor: Anne Strømøy
- ISO 3166 code: NO-39
- Revenue: 2.200 billion kr
- Employees: 2,000
- Schools: 7
- Pupils: 8,500
- Transit authority: Vestfold Kollektivtrafikk
- Website: www.vfk.no

Vestfold County Municipality (Norwegian: Vestfold fylkeskommune) is the regional governing administration of Vestfold county in Norway, after the county was re-established in 2024. The county municipality was earlier established on 1 January 1976 when the law was changed to allow elected county councils in Norway. The county municipality was dissolved on 1 January 2020, when Vestfold was merged with the neighboring Telemark county, creating the new Vestfold og Telemark county which was led by the Vestfold og Telemark County Municipality. The administrative seat is located in Tønsberg and the county mayor is Anne Strømøy of the Conservative Party and the chief administrative officer for the county municipality is Toril Eeg.

The main responsibilities of the county municipality includes the governing of ten upper secondary schools with about 8,500 pupils in addition to Skiringssal Folk High School. It manages all the county roadways, public transport, dental care, culture, and cultural heritage sites in the county. Public transport is managed through Vestfold Kollektivtrafikk.

== County government ==
The Vestfold county council (Norwegian: Fylkestinget) is made up of 39 representatives that are elected every four years. The council essentially acts as a Parliament or legislative body for the county and it meets several times each year. The council is divided into standing committees and an executive board (fylkesutvalg) which meet considerably more often. Both the council and executive board are led by the County Mayor (fylkesordfører) who holds the executive powers of the county.

=== County mayors ===
- 1964-1971: Torgeir Andersen (Conservative Party)
- 1972-1975: Harald Thaulow (Conservative Party)
- 1976-1991: Sverre Nordby (Conservative Party)
- 1992-2003: Ellen Gjerpe Hansen (Conservative Party)
- 2003-2005: Anne Rygh Pedersen (Labour Party)
- 2005-2007: Tove Lisbeth Vasvik (Labour Party)
- 2007-2014: Per-Eivind Johansen (Conservative Party)
- 2015-2019: Rune Hogsnes (Conservative Party)
- 2023- : Anne Strømøy (Conservative Party)

=== County council ===
The party breakdown of the council is as follows:

Vestfold fylkesting 2024
Party name (in Norwegian)	Number of representatives
Labour Party (Arbeiderpartiet)	13
Progress Party (Fremskrittspartiet)	5
Green Party (Miljøpartiet De Grønne)	2
Conservative Party (Høyre)	12
Christian Democratic Party (Kristelig Folkeparti)	2
Centre Party (Senterpartiet)	2
Socialist Left Party (Sosialistisk Venstreparti)	1
Liberal Party (Venstre)	2
Total number of members:	39

Vestfold fylkesting 2012–2015
Party name (in Norwegian)	Number of representatives
Labour Party (Arbeiderpartiet)	13
Progress Party (Fremskrittspartiet)	5
Conservative Party (Høyre)	14
Christian Democratic Party (Kristelig Folkeparti)	2
Centre Party (Senterpartiet)	1
Socialist Left Party (Sosialistisk Venstreparti)	2
Liberal Party (Venstre)	2
Total number of members:	39

Vestfold fylkesting 2008–2011
Party name (in Norwegian)	Number of representatives
Labour Party (Arbeiderpartiet)	12
Progress Party (Fremskrittspartiet)	9
Conservative Party (Høyre)	9
Christian Democratic Party (Kristelig Folkeparti)	2
Red Party (Rødt)	1
Centre Party (Senterpartiet)	2
Socialist Left Party (Sosialistisk Venstreparti)	2
Liberal Party (Venstre)	2
Total number of members:	39

Vestfold fylkesting 2004–2007
Party name (in Norwegian)	Number of representatives
Labour Party (Arbeiderpartiet)	9
Progress Party (Fremskrittspartiet)	10
Conservative Party (Høyre)	7
Christian Democratic Party (Kristelig Folkeparti)	2
Red Electoral Alliance (Rød Valgallianse)	1
Centre Party (Senterpartiet)	2
Socialist Left Party (Sosialistisk Venstreparti)	5
Liberal Party (Venstre)	1
Vestfold List (Vestfoldlista)	2
Total number of members:	39

Vestfold fylkesting 2000–2003
Party name (in Norwegian)	Number of representatives
Labour Party (Arbeiderpartiet)	10
Progress Party (Fremskrittspartiet)	7
Conservative Party (Høyre)	10
Christian Democratic Party (Kristelig Folkeparti)	4
Red Electoral Alliance (Rød Valgallianse)	1
Centre Party (Senterpartiet)	2
Socialist Left Party (Sosialistisk Venstreparti)	3
Liberal Party (Venstre)	1
Hospital List (Sykehuslista)	7
Total number of members:	45

Vestfold fylkesting 1996–1999
Party name (in Norwegian)	Number of representatives
Labour Party (Arbeiderpartiet)	13
Progress Party (Fremskrittspartiet)	7
Conservative Party (Høyre)	13
Christian Democratic Party (Kristelig Folkeparti)	4
Red Electoral Alliance (Rød Valgallianse)	1
Centre Party (Senterpartiet)	4
Socialist Left Party (Sosialistisk Venstreparti)	2
Liberal Party (Venstre)	1
Total number of members:	45

Vestfold fylkesting 1992–1995
Party name (in Norwegian)	Number of representatives
Labour Party (Arbeiderpartiet)	13
Progress Party (Fremskrittspartiet)	4
Conservative Party (Høyre)	14
Christian Democratic Party (Kristelig Folkeparti)	4
Centre Party (Senterpartiet)	4
Socialist Left Party (Sosialistisk Venstreparti)	5
Liberal Party (Venstre)	1
Total number of members:	45

Vestfold fylkesting 1988–1991
Party name (in Norwegian)	Number of representatives
Labour Party (Arbeiderpartiet)	15
Progress Party (Fremskrittspartiet)	7
Conservative Party (Høyre)	14
Christian Democratic Party (Kristelig Folkeparti)	3
Centre Party (Senterpartiet)	2
Socialist Left Party (Sosialistisk Venstreparti)	2
Liberal Party (Venstre)	2
Total number of members:	45

Vestfold fylkesting 1984–1987
Party name (in Norwegian)	Number of representatives
Labour Party (Arbeiderpartiet)	16
Progress Party (Fremskrittspartiet)	4
Conservative Party (Høyre)	16
Christian Democratic Party (Kristelig Folkeparti)	3
Centre Party (Senterpartiet)	2
Socialist Left Party (Sosialistisk Venstreparti)	2
Liberal Party (Venstre)	2
Total number of members:	45

Vestfold fylkesting 1980–1983
Party name (in Norwegian)	Number of representatives
Labour Party (Arbeiderpartiet)	16
Progress Party (Fremskrittspartiet)	1
Conservative Party (Høyre)	18
Christian Democratic Party (Kristelig Folkeparti)	4
Centre Party (Senterpartiet)	3
Socialist Left Party (Sosialistisk Venstreparti)	1
Liberal Party (Venstre)	2
Total number of members:	45

Vestfold fylkesting 1976–1979
Party name (in Norwegian)	Number of representatives
Labour Party (Arbeiderpartiet)	16
Conservative Party (Høyre)	14
Christian Democratic Party (Kristelig Folkeparti)	5
New People's Party (Nye Folkepartiet)	1
Centre Party (Senterpartiet)	4
Socialist Left Party (Sosialistisk Venstreparti)	2
Liberal Party (Venstre)	2
Total number of members:	45
