= Vestfold Kollektivtrafikk =

Public transport administration for the county of Vestfold in Norway

Vestfold Kollektivtrafikk AS
- Company type: County owned
- Industry: Public transport
- Founded: 17 April 1998
- Headquarters: Tønsberg, Norway
- Area served: Vestfold
- Key people: Erik Gundersen (CEO)
- Services: Bus transport
- Owners: Vestfold County Municipality
- Website: www.vkt.no

Vestfold Kollektivtrafikk (VKT) (lit. Vestfold Public Transport) is the public transport administration for the county of Vestfold in Norway. VKT is responsible for planning, organising and marketing bus transport in the county, but does not operate any buses. Instead the operation is done by private companies based on public service obligation contracts or negotiations. VKT is organised as a limited company owned by the county administration. The administration is located in Tønsberg.

VKT organises bus routes managed by 650 buses driving 26 million km per year.
