= List of railway companies of Norway =

This is a list of railway companies in Norway.

== Companies ==
Type indicates the role of the company. Integrated companies operate both the infrastructure and the trains. Freight companies operate only freight trains, while ore companies operate ore trains on contract with a mining company on a single line. Passenger companies operate only passenger trains, trams or rapid transits. Infrastructure companies are government-owned agencies or limited companies that own only the right-of-way, while the trains are operated by other companies. Authorities are public bodies responsible for marketing, grants and planning of the urban railways. Rolling stock companies only own the rolling stock, which is leased to other companies.

*	Company is owned by national or local governments
¤*	Company is government-owned, but founded as private enterprise
¤	Company is private

Company	Type	Lines	Years	Owner	Successor	Ref
Akersbanerne	Infrastructure	Oslo Tramway	1917–49	Aker Municipality*	Oslo Sporveier	
Bane NOR	Infrastructure	Mainline	2017–	Ministry of Transport and Communications*	—	
Bergen Sporvei	Integrated	Bergen Tramway	1897–1965	Bergen Municipality*	Terminated	
Boreal Bane	Integrated	Trondheim Tramway	1990–	Boreal Norge¤	—	
Bybanen	Infrastructure	Bergen Light Rail	2010–	Hordaland County Municipality*	—	
Bærumsbanen	Integrated	Oslo Tramway	1924–71	Oslo Sporveier*	Oslo Sporveier	
Cargolink	Freight	Mainline	2008–16	Autolink¤	Terminated	
CargoNet	Freight	Mainline	1996–	Vy*	—	
Dunderland Iron Ore Company	Ore	Dunderland	1904–47	Private¤	Norwegian State Railways	
Ekebergbanen	Integrated	Oslo Tramway	1917–93	Oslo Sporveier*	Oslo Sporveier	
Elkem	Integrated	Sulitjelma	1918–65	Oslo Municipality*	Terminated	
Flytoget	Passenger	Gardermoen	1998–	Ministry of Trade and Industry*	—	
Graakalbanen	Integrated	Trondheim Tramway	1924–71	Trondheim Sporvei¤*	Trondheim Trafikkselskap	
Go-Ahead Nordic	Passenger	Arendal; Jæren; Sørlandet	2019-	Go-Ahead Group	—	
Grimstadbanen	Integrated	Grimstad	1907–12	Private¤	Norwegian State Railways	
Holmenkolbanen	Integrated	Oslo Tramway	1898–1991	Oslo Sporveier*	Oslo Sporveier	
Holmestrand–Vittingfossbanen	Integrated	Holmestrand–Vittingfoss	1902–31	Private¤	Vestfold Privatbaner	
Keolis Norge	Passenger	Bergen Light Rail	2010–	Keolis	—	
Kristiania Elektriske Sporvei	Integrated	Oslo Tramway	1894–1924	Private¤	Oslo Sporveier	
Kristiania Kommunale Sporveie	Integrated	Oslo Tramway	1899–1905	Oslo Municipality*	Kristiania Sporveisselskab	
Kristiania Sporveisselskab	Integrated	Oslo Tramway	1875–1924	Private¤	Oslo Sporveier	
Lierbanen	Integrated	Lier	1904–37	Private¤	Terminated	
Lillesand–Flaksvandbanen	Integrated	Lillesand–Flaksvand	1896–53	Private¤	Terminated	
Linx	Integrated	Mainline	2000–04	Norwegian State Railways*; SJ*	Terminated	
Malmtrafik	Ore	Ofoten	1996–	SSAB Svenskt Stål*	—	
Nesttun–Osbanen	Integrated	Nesttun–Os	1894–1935	Private¤	Terminated	
Norsk Transport	Integrated	Rjukan	1907–91	Norsk Hydro¤	Terminated	
Norsk Hoved-Jernbane	Integrated	Hoved	1854–??	Private¤	Norwegian State Railways	
Norwegian National Rail Administration	Infrastructure	Mainline	1996–2016	Ministry of Transport and Communications*	Bane NOR; Norwegian Railway Directorate	
Norwegian State Railways	Integrated	Mainline	1883–1996	Ministry of Transport and Communications*	Vy; Norwegian National Rail Administration	
Ofotbanen	Mixed	Mainline	2001–08	Mons Bolin; Autolink*	—	
Oslo Lysverker	Integrated	Solbergfoss	1918–65	Oslo Municipality*	Terminated	
Oslo Sporveier	Integrated	Oslo Metro; Oslo Tramway	1924–2006	Oslo Municipality*	Kollektivtransportproduksjon	
Oslo Vognselskap	Rolling stock	Oslo Metro; Oslo Tramway	2006–	Kollektivtransportproduksjon*	—	
Ruter	Authority	Oslo Metro; Oslo Tramway	2008–	Oslo Municipality; Akershus County Municipality*	—	
Salvesen & Thams	Integrated	Thamshavn	1908–74	Orkla*	Terminated	
SJ Norge	Passenger	-	2020-	SJ	—	
Skyss	Authority	Bergen Light Rail	2010–	Hordaland County Municipality*	—	
Sporveien	Infrastructure	Oslo Metro; Oslo Tramway	2006–	Oslo Municipality*	—	
Sporveien T-banen	Passenger	Oslo Metro	2003–	Sporveien*	—	
Sporveien Trikken	Passenger	Oslo Tramway	2003–	Sporveien*	—	
Sydvaranger	Ore	Kirkenes–Bjørnevatn	1910–96; 2009–	Ministry of Trade and Industry*	—	
Timetoget	Passenger	Bratsberg	1999–2000	Norwegian State Railways*	Terminated	
Tønsberg–Eidsfossbanen	Integrated	Tønsberg–Eidsfoss	1901–31	Private¤	Vestfold Privatbaner	
Trondheim Sporvei	Integrated	Trondheim Tramway	1936–74	Trondheim Municipality*	Trondheim Trafikkselskap	
Trondheim Trafikkselskap	Integrated	Trondheim Tramway	1974–88	Trondheim Municipality*	AS Gråkallbanen (Boreal Bane)	
Trondhjems Elektricitetsværk og Sporvei	Integrated	Trondheim Tramway	1901–36	Trondheim Municipality*	Trondheim Sporvei	
Urskog–Høland Line	Integrated	Urskog–Høland	1896–1945	Private¤	Norwegian State Railways	
Valdresbanen	Integrated	Valdres	1902–37	Private¤	Norwegian State Railways	
Vestfold Privatbaner	Integrated	Tønsberg–Eidsfoss; Holmestrand–Vittingfoss	1931–38	Private¤	Terminated	
Vy	Passenger	Mainline	1996–	Ministry of Transport and Communications*	—	
Vy Gjøvikbanen	Passenger	Gjøvik	2006–	Vy*	—	
Vy Tog	Passenger	Bergen	2020–	Vy*	—	

== See also ==
- List of railway lines in Norway
