= List of railway lines in Norway =

Map of the railway lines in Norway. — electrified lines — non-electrified lines — disused or heritage lines

The Norwegian railway network consists as of March 2010 of 4,159 kilometres (2,584 mi) of line, owned and managed by the Norwegian National Rail Administration. Of this, 3,900 kilometres (2,400 mi) has regular traffic. This includes 30 lines in regular traffic and 10 lines with irregular traffic. Twenty-four of these lines are electrified. Norway's longest is the Nordland Line, which runs 734 kilometres (456 mi) from Trondheim to Bodø. The longest electrified line is the Sørlandet Line, which runs 563 kilometres (350 mi) from Drammen to Stavanger.

As of March 2010, the system consists of 241 kilometres (150 mi) of double track, 2487 bridges, 695 tunnels, 3514 level crossings and 358 stations. The Drammen Line, the Gardermoen Line and the Asker Line are the only to be double track in their entire length.

== List ==
The following list contains all non-industrial railways to be completed in Norway. The list states the line's name and its terminal stations, or terminal points, if it does not terminate at a station. The list indicates if the line was opened as a private railway (one not owned or operated by NSB, and since 1996 by the National Rail Administration), and if the private line was later nationalized. The list also states which gauge the line was built in, and if it later has been converted to another gauge. The overall length and length of double track are given in kilometers and miles; this is the route length, not the length of the track. For those lines that have the full route in operation, the distance is the current length, while for lines that have been closed partially or in full, it is the length at the time of the opening. Next is listed if the line is electrified or not, and if the line was electrified at a different system than the standard 15 kV 16.7 Hz AC used by NSB and the National Rail Administration. The list then states the number of stations, bridges and tunnels on the line; for currently operating lines, this is the current count, while for other lines, it is the peak count in the line's history. The list then states the date the first section of line was taken into use and the date the last section of the line was taken into use. These dates may or may not be the same day that the official opening took place. For those railways that have been closed in full, the date of the closing (the first date without permitted revenue transport) is stated, along with if the track remains or not, and if the line has been taken into use by a heritage railway. This column also states if part of the railway has been closed for revenue traffic.

¤	Private
¤*	Opened private, since nationalized
#	Parts of the line closed
†	Heritage
††	Closed; tracks remain
†††	Closed; tracks removed
§	Opened with 1,000 mm (3 ft 3 3/8 in) narrow gauge.
*	Opened with 1,067 mm (3 ft 6 in) narrow gauge.
**	Opened with 1,067 mm (3 ft 6 in) narrow gauge, since converted to standard gauge.
***	Parts opened with 1,067 mm (3 ft 6 in) narrow gauge, since converted to standard gauge.
£	Opened with 750 mm (2 ft 5 1/2 in) narrow gauge.
££	Opened with 750 mm (2 ft 5 1/2 in) narrow gauge, since converted to 1,067 mm (3 ft 6 in) narrow gauge.
$	Electrified at a non-standard voltage

El	Electrified
St	Number of stations
Br	Number of bridges
Tu	Number of tunnels

Line	Termini	Length (km)	Length (mi)	Double track (km)	Double track (mi)	El	St	Br	Tu	Opened	Completed	Closed	Ref(s)
Ålgård	Ganddal–Ålgård**	12	7	0	0	No	8	1	17	24 December 1924	24 December 1924	#	
Alna	Alnabru–Grefsen	2	1	0	0	Yes	0	6	1	20 January 1901	20 January 1901	—	
Alnabru–Loenga	Alnabru–Loenga	3	2	0	0	Yes	0	0	0	1 May 1907	1 May 1907	—	
Arendal	Nelaug–Arendal**	36	22	0	0	Yes	8	16	3	18 December 1910	18 December 1910	—	
Asker	Sandvika–Asker	15	9	15	9	Yes	0	2	3	1 August 2005	1 August 2005	—	
Askim–Solbergfoss^{¤}	Askim–Solbergfoss	8	5	0	0	No	5	2	0	1918	1918	1 April 1965^{†††}	
Bergen	Hønefoss–Bergen***	371	231	0	0	Yes	38	205	145	11 July 1883	1 December 1909	—	
Bratsberg	Eidanger–Nordagutu	47	29	0	0	Yes	3	45	20	18 December 1917	18 December 1917	—	
Brevik	Eidanger–Brevik**	9	6	0	0	Yes	0	18	0	16 October 1915	16 October 1915	—	
Dalane–Suldal	Dalane–Suldal	1	1	0	0	Yes	0	0	0	1 March 1878	1 March 1944	—	
Drammen	Oslo S – Drammen**	42	26	42	26	Yes	16	29	11	7 October 1872	7 October 1872	—	
Dovre	Eidsvoll – Trondheim S***	492	306	4	2	Yes	29	328	42	23 June 1862	20 September 1921	—	
Eastern Østfold	Ski–Sarpsborg	79	49	0	0	Yes	15	32	2	24 November 1882	24 November 1882	—	
Flåm	Myrdal–Flåm	20	12	0	0	Yes	9	2	21	15 October 1941	15 October 1941	—	
Flekkefjord	Sira–Flekkefjord	17	11	0	0	No	15	2	17	1 November 1904	1 November 1904	1 January 1991^{††}	
Gardermoen	Etterstad–Eidsvoll	64	40	62	39	Yes	3	13	4	8 October 1998	22 August 1999	—	
Gjøvik	Oslo S – Gjøvik	123	76	2	1	Yes	23	72	7	20 December 1900	28 November 1902	—	
Grimstad^{¤}*	Grimstad–Rise	22	14	0	0	No	18	2	0	16 September 1907	16 September 1907	1 September 1961^{†††}	
Hardanger	Voss–Granvin	28	17	0	0	Yes	13	3	4	1 April 1935	1 April 1935	#	
Holmestrand–Vittingfoss^{¤}	Holmestrand–Vittingfoss*	24	15	0	0	No	12	1	1	1 October 1902	1 October 1902	1 June 1938^{†††}	
Horten	Skoppum–Horten**	7	4	0	0	Yes	6	0	0	7 December 1881	7 December 1881	—	
Kirkenes–Bjørnevatn^{¤}	Finneid–Fagerli	8	5	0	0	No	3	0	1	13 July 1910	13 July 1910	††	
Kongsvinger	Lillestrøm–Charlottenberg	116	72	0	0	Yes	17	62	0	3 October 1862	4 November 1865	—	
Kragerø	Neslandsvatn–Kragerø	27	17	0	0	No	13	4	11	2 December 1927	2 December 1927	1 January 1989^{†††}	
Krøderen	Vikersund–Krøderen**	16	10	0	0	No	16	0	0	28 November 1872	28 November 1872	1 March 1985^{†}	
Lier^{¤}	Lier–Svangstrand*	20	12	0	0	No	9	3	0	15 July 1903	15 July 1903	1 January 1937^{†††}	
Lillesand–Flaksvand^{¤}	Lillesand–Flaksvand*	17	11	0	0	No	9	0	0	4 June 1896	4 June 1896	22 June 1953^{†††}	
Meråker	Hell–Storlien	70	43	0	0	No	4	60	1	17 October 1881	17 October 1881	—	
Namsos	Grong–Namsos	52	32	0	0	No	21	7	5	16 November 1896	7 December 1903	—	
Nesttun–Os^{¤}	Holmestrand–Vittingfoss^{£}	26	16	0	0	No	11	0	0	1 July 1894	1 July 1894	1 September 1935^{†††}	
Nordland	Trondheim S – Bodø	734	456	0	0	No	29	328	42	1 February 1902	1 February 1962	—	
Numedal	Kongsberg–Rødberg	93	58	0	0	No	0	5	19	20 November 1927	20 November 1927	#	
Ofoten	Narvik–Vassijaure	43	27	0	0	Yes	6	5	18	15 November 1902	15 November 1902	—	
Oslo Port	Oslo S – Oslo V	8	5	0	0	No	0	0	1	13 November 1907	13 November 1907	1983^{†††}	
Østfold	Oslo S – Kornsjø	171	106	64	40	Yes	23	134	17	2 January 1879	25 July 1879	—	
Randsfjorden	Hokksund–Randsfjord**	72	45	0	0	Yes	2	21	1	15 November 1866	16 October 1868	#	
Rauma	Dombås–Åndalsnes	116	72	0	0	No	4	103	5	30 November 1924	30 November 1924	—	
Rjukan^{¤}	Mæl–Rjukan	16	10	0	0	Yes^{$}	9	2	1	9 August 1909	9 August 1909	5 July 1991^{††}	
Roa–Hønefoss	Roa–Hønefoss	34	21	0	0	Yes	0	27	3	11 July 1883	1 December 1909	—	
Røros	Hamar–Støren**	382	237	0	0	No	27	223	6	5 August 1864	16 January 1877	—	
Røykenvik	Jaren–Røykenvik	7	4	0	0	No	3	2	0	20 December 1900	20 December 1900	11 November 1957^{†††}	
Setesdal	Kristiansand–Byglandsfjord*	79	49	0	0	No	61	7	17	27 November 1896	27 November 1896	2 September 1962^{†}	
Skreia	Reinsvoll–Skreia	22	14	0	0	No	11	0	0	28 November 1902	28 November 1902	15 September 1963^{†††}	
Skøyen–Filipstad	Skøyen–Filipstad**	2	1	1	1	Yes	0	0	0	7 October 1872	7 October 1872	#	
Solør	Kongsvinger–Elverum	88	55	0	0	No	0	31	1	3 November 1893	4 December 1910	—	
Sørlandet	Drammen–Stavanger***	549	341	0	0	Yes	43	526	191	1 March 1878	1 March 1944	—	
Sperillen	Hen–Sperillen	24	15	0	0	No	12	1	2	2 August 1926	2 August 1926	10 August 1957^{†††}	
Spikkestad	Asker–Spikkestad**	12	7	0	0	Yes	7	0	8	7 October 1872	7 October 1872	—	
Stavne–Leangen	Stavne–Leangen	6	4	0	0	No	1	8	2	1 June 1957	1 June 1957	—	
Sulitjelma^{¤}	Finneid–Fagerli^{££}	36	22	0	0	No	15	5	6	13 October 1892	20 December 1956	23 July 1972^{†}	
Thamshavn^{¤}	Holmestrand–Vittingfoss^{§}	26	16	0	0	Yes^{$}	15	2	1	15 July 1908	15 August 1910	30 May 1974^{†}	
Tinnoset^{¤}*	Hjuksebø–Tinnoset	30	19	0	0	Yes^{$}	2	20	9	9 August 1909	9 August 1909	#	
Tønsberg–Eidsfoss^{¤}	Tønsberg–Eidsfoss*	48	30	0	0	No	19	3	0	21 October 1901	21 October 1901	1 June 1938^{†††}	
Treungen	Nelaug–Treungen**	65	40	0	0	No	12	1	2	2 August 1926	2 August 1926	10 August 1957^{†††}	
Trunk^{¤}*	Oslo S – Eidsvoll	84	52	20	12	Yes	21	60	4	1 September 1854	1 September 1854	—	
Urskog–Høland^{¤}*	Sørumsand–Skulerud^{£}	56	35	0	0	No	24	2	0	16 November 1896	7 December 1903	1 July 1960^{†}	
Valdres	Eina–Fagernes	108	67	0	0	No	24	3	3	28 November 1902	29 October 1906	#	
Vestfold	Drammen–Eidanger**	128	80	17	11	Yes	11	99	16	7 December 1881	24 November 1882	—	
Vestmarka	Skotterud–Vestmarka	14	9	0	0	No	12	1	0	15 October 1918	15 October 1918	1 June 1965^{†††}	

== See also ==
- List of railway companies of Norway
