= Private railways of Norway =

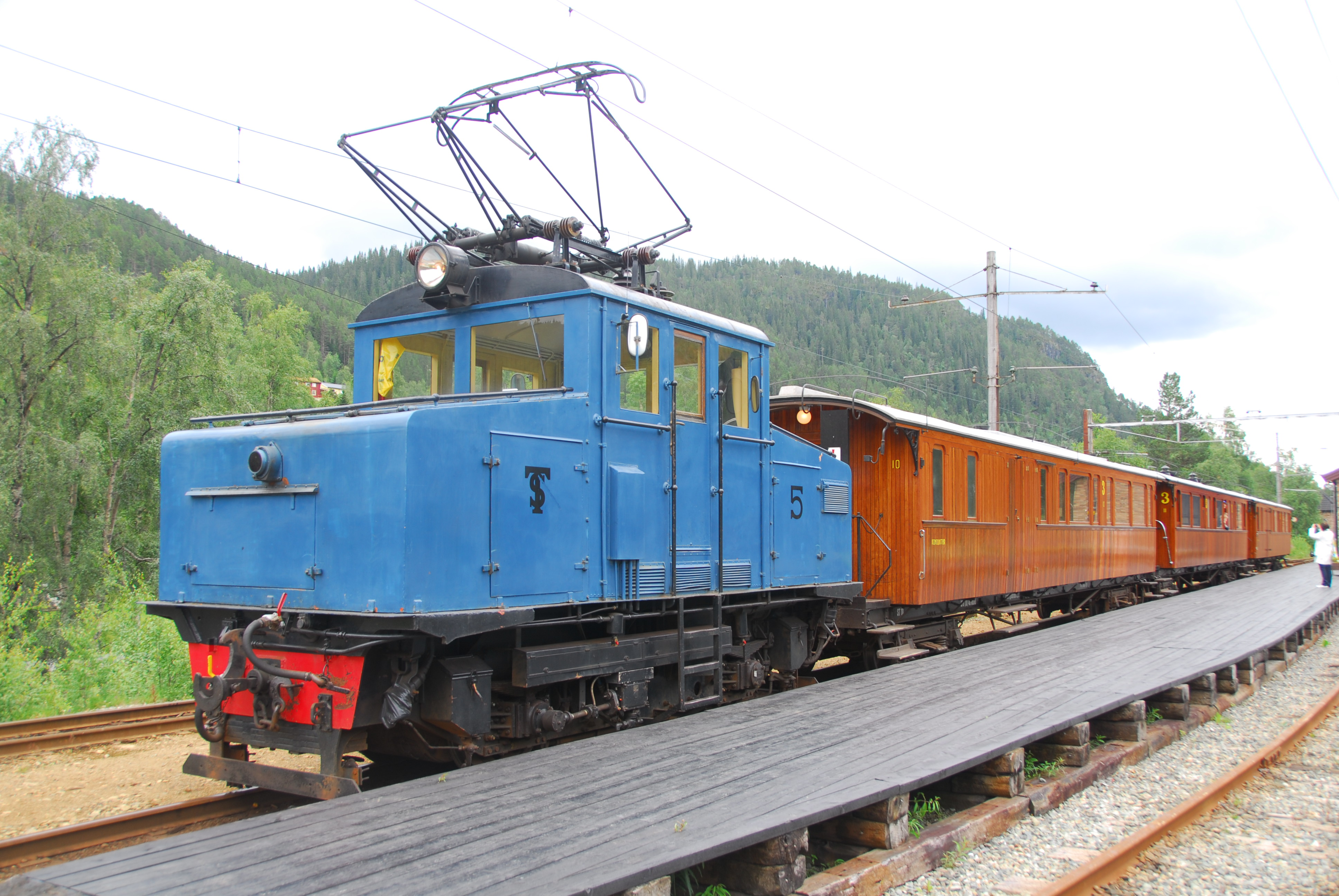
The former industrial Thamshavn Line also featured passenger transport, and has been converted to a heritage railway

Private railways in Norway consist of industrial and public railways. Industrial railways were used to transport ore or other industrial products to ports, although they have, particularly to begin with, also operated passenger and cargo services. The other nine private railways have been public and operated as mixed passenger and freight services. Of these, four were later taken over by the Norwegian State Railways (NSB). Only five non-industrial railways were never nationalized, despite all having been closed. There were the Nesttun–Os, Holmestrand–Vittingfoss, Lillesand–Flaksvand, Tønsberg–Eidsfoss and the Lier lines. No industrial railways remain in operation, although one former private railway, the Trunk Line, Norway's first railway, is still in use.

The division between private and publicly owned railways is related to operation rather than ownership. All non-industrial private railways received state grants for construction, while many of NSB's railways were at first organized as limited companies with private owners, although NSB was responsible for all operations and maintenance of the line and rolling stock. For both NSB-run and private, non-industrial railways, municipalities and counties were often the largest owners. Eventually, all the private, non-industrial railways started losing money, and unless they received subsidies, were forced to close. However, the state and municipalities often provided subsidies to keep them operational. The last private railway to close was the Lillesand–Flaksvand Line, in 1958.

== List ==
The following is a list of the private railways in Norway. It includes the line, type (industrial or public), the owner at the time the railway was closed, the longest length of the line, the gauge, the date the line opened, was nationalized and was closed for passenger and cargo, if applicable. The list only contains industrial railways which at some point had regular passenger transport.

Line	Type	Owner	Length (km)	Length (mi)	Gauge	Opened	Nationalized	Closed (passengers)	Closed (cargo)
Dunderland	Industrial	Dunderland Iron Ore Company	22.0	13.7	1,435 mm (4 ft 8 1/2 in)	1 November 1904	—	—	—
Grimstad	Public	—	22.1	13.7	1,067 mm (3 ft 6 in)	15 September 1907	24 January 1912	1 September 1961	1 September 1961
Holmestrand–Vittingfoss	Public	Vestfold Privatbaner	24.4	15.2	1,067 mm (3 ft 6 in)	2 October 1902	—	27 September 1931	1 June 1938
Lier	Public	—	20.6	12.8	1,067 mm (3 ft 6 in)	2 October 1904	—	23 October 1932	1 January 1937
Lillesand–Flaksvand	Public	—	16.6	10.3	1,067 mm (3 ft 6 in)	4 June 1894	—	15 June 1953	15 June 1953
Nesttun–Os	Public	—	26.3	16.3	750 mm (2 ft 5 1/2 in)	1 July 1894	—	2 September 1935	2 September 1935
Rjukan	Industrial	Norsk Transport	46.0	28.6	1,435 mm (4 ft 8 1/2 in)	9 August 1909	—		1 July 1991
Solbergfoss	Industrial	Oslo Lysverker	7.9	4.9	1,435 mm (4 ft 8 1/2 in)	1918	—		4 January 1965
Sulitjelma	Industrial	Elkem	38.5	23.9	1,067 mm (3 ft 6 in)	13 October 1892	—		15 June 1915
Thamshavn	Industrial	Salvesen & Thams	25.3	15.7	1,000 mm (3 ft 3 3/8 in)	15 July 1908	—		30 May 1974
Tønsberg–Eidsfoss	Public	Vestfold Privatbaner	48.0	29.8	1,067 mm (3 ft 6 in)	21 October 1901	—	1 June 1938	1 June 1938
Trunk	Public	—	67.8	42.1	1,435 mm (4 ft 8 1/2 in)	1 September 1854	4 March 1926	—	—
Urskog–Høland	Public	—	56.8	35.3	750 mm (2 ft 5 1/2 in)	14 November 1896	1 July 1945	1 July 1960	1 July 1960
Valdres	Public	—	108.6	67.5	1,435 mm (4 ft 8 1/2 in)	1 September 1902	1 January 1937	1 January 1989	—
