= Holmestrand Private Station =

Railway station in Holmestrand, Norway

Holmestrand
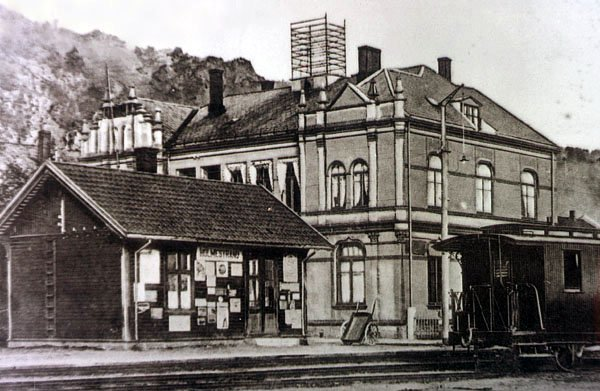
- The station in 1910

General information
- Location: Holmestrand; Norway
- Coordinates: 59.48931°N 10.31728°E
- Elevation: 0.6 m (2 ft 0 in)
- Owner: Holmestrand–Vittingfoss Line (1902–34); Vestfold Privatbaner (1934–38)
- Line: Holmestrand–Vittingfoss Line
- Distance: 0 km (0 mi)

History
- Opened: 1 October 1902
- Closed: 1 June 1938
Location
- Location within Norway

Holmestrand Private Station (Norwegian: Holmestrand privatstasjon) was a railway station located in Holmestrand, Norway. It served as the terminus station of the private Holmestrand–Vittingfoss Line (HVB), which was in use between 1902 and 1937. The station was connected to the Norwegian State Railways' (NSB) Holmestrand Station on the Vestfold Line.

== History ==
The town's first station opened in 1881 and serving the Vestfold Line, was operated by the Norwegian State Railways (NSB). With the planning of a private railway to Hvittingfoss during the last years of the 1890s, a controversy arose over the location of a new station in Holmestrand. As both single parcels and whole wagon-loads would be transshipped between HVB and NSB, the two railway lines would necessarily have to be connected. Five proposals for lines were made, which would either give a common station for both railways in Holmestrand, or two separate stations. Two of the alternatives called for a common station, with the tracks either running via Gausen or the docks. A separate station was proposed either at the town square, with the connection line being built via Gausen or the docks. Alternatively, the station could be built at Gausen.

Holmestrand Municipal Council voted on 20 November 1900 in favor of a station at the square with a connection over Gausen, estimated to cost NOK 43,000, including the connection line. Because this avoided running via the docks, this gave the lowest cost. Other alternatives cost as much as NOK 154,000. However, NSB's district chief stated on 18 May 1901 that the state railways were opposed to this alternative because the link would have a negative influence on operations at Holmestrand Station. After negotiations the two companies reached an agreement, with permission given on 26 August 1902.

The station cost NOK 27,300. The largest amount was for the depot, which cost NOK 5,000. Other major posts were NOK 3,000 for the freight house and NOK 2,000 each for the station building and wagon shed. Signaling systems and inventory cost NOK 2,000. HVB was officially opened on 2 October 1902. The shed at Gausen quickly proved to be too small and was expanded in 1906 with additional space for rolling stock and a carpenter's workshop, costing NOK 1153.65. It was expanded further the following year for NOK 322.60. The final expansion took place in 1910, when a shed for storing and drying wood was built. At first the station only had three tracks, increasing to four in 1907, costing NOK 347.46. That year the station handled 68 tonnes of express cargo and 8,884 tonnes of regular cargo, in addition to 24 live animals. Later the station also received two additional spurs which each had a small turnstiles.

On 23 October 1910 the docks at Holmestrand Station collapsed, taking with it large amounts of lumber and a warehouse. Fifty men were immediately dispatched from Vittingfoss Bruk to clean up and build new docks. The accident had been caused by 1,600 tonnes of pulp, which was more than the docks were capable of carrying. During the night of 1 November a storm hit Holmestrand, washing away some of the dockside permanent way, leaving only the tracks hanging in the air. By 3 November all but three tonnes of pulp had been salvaged.

The original connection with the Vestfold Line gave operating difficulties for NSB, resulting in the line over Gausen being replaced by a new line over Traneberghaugen, which opened on 21 December 1910. The new double track line cost NOK 200,000, financed by a loan provided by Holmestrand Municipality. In 1910 the station handled 11,630 tonnes of freight and 13,705 of milk, most of which was sent to Viking Melk. The station handled 17,205 passengers, of which 800 traveled on second class and the rest on third, giving the station a revenue of NOK 134,198. Through the next few years a new stone platform was built at the station building and the coal shed expanded. The station building was expanded in 1917 and four years later it received a renovation with new interior and electrical lighting. The station had 23,645 passengers, 191 tonnes of express cargo and 4,393 tonnes of regular cargo in 1921.

The docks collapsed again on 17 February 1925, this time simply by sinking under the massive load of wood. The docks, measuring 170 square meters (1,800 sq ft), had not handled the 3,000 tonnes per square meter load. A new, enforced dock was built during the summer. HVB merged with the Tønsberg–Eidsfoss Line on 23 August 1934 through the creation of a new railway company, Vestfold Privatbaner. The move was met with disregard in Holmestrand, as the new company selected Tønsberg for its head office. Vestfold Privatbaner had a troubled economy, as Vittingfoss Bruk repeatedly shut down production. The railway company's director thus in 1936 started the process of closing the segment from Hillestad to Holmestrand, and from 1936 only irregular trains ran on the segment.

== Facilities ==
The station was located at the town square in Holmestrand. It was located 1.1 kilometers (0.68 mi) from Gausen and 1.4 kilometers (0.87 mi) from Reversen Station, the next along the line. The station was 29.80 kilometers (18.52 mi) from Hvittingfoss Station. Holmestrand Station was located 0.6 meters (2 ft 0 in) above mean sea level.

Holmestrand was the main depot of HVB and included a series of operations buildings in addition to the company's administration. It consisted of a station building, a freight building, an outhouse, a locomotive depot, a wagon shed, a coal shed, a turntable and a guardhouse. The station had five tracks, of which three were spurs. Two of these connected to small turnstiles, which were only large enough to handle freight cars. North of the station the line connected to the Vestfold Line at Holmestrand Station. At Gausen there was an engine shed with two tracks. There were gradually built branch lines to major industrial facilities in town, such as the power company Holmestrand Elektrisitetsverk, Nordisk Aluminium and the fish market.

| Preceding station | | Following station |
|---|---|---|
| Reversen | Holmestrand–Vittingfoss Line | Holmestrand |
