= HVB =

HVB may refer to:

- Hervey Bay Airport, in Queensland, Australia
- Holmestrand–Vittingfoss Line, an abandoned railway line in Norway
- HypoVereinsbank, a German financial institution
