= Eidsfoss Church =

Church in Vestfold, Norway

- Eidsfoss kirke
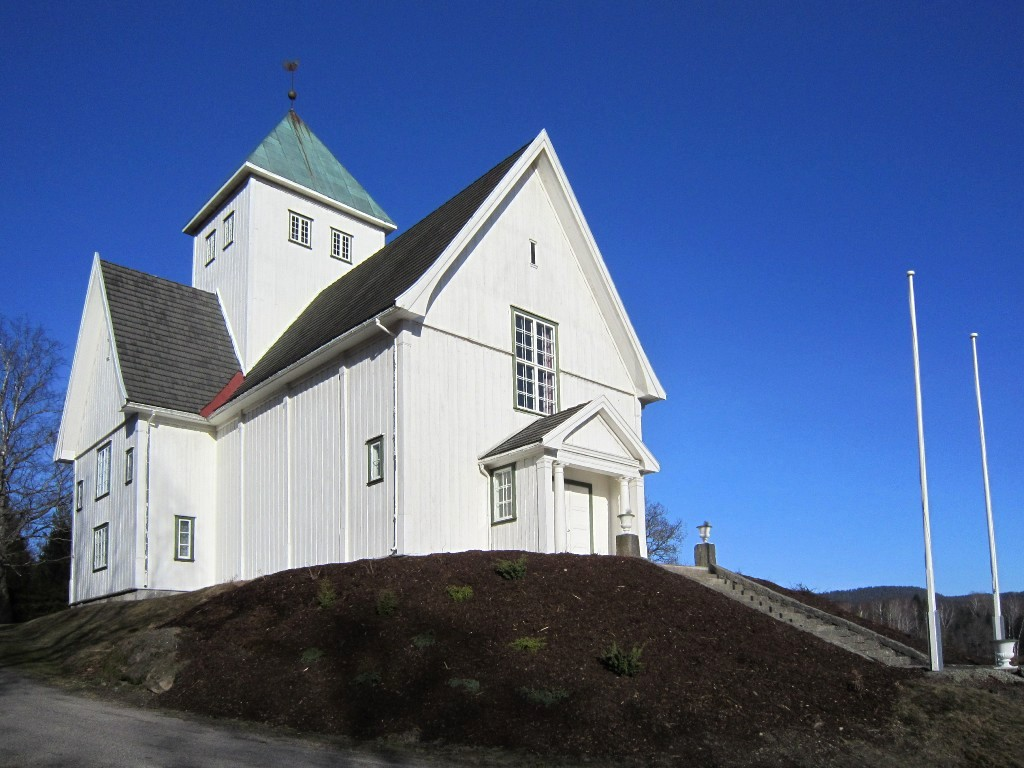
- View of the church
- Eidsfoss Church
- 59°35′31″N 10°02′43″E
- Location: Holmestrand Municipality, Vestfold
- Country: Norway
- Denomination: Church of Norway
- Churchmanship: Evangelical Lutheran

History
- Status: Parish church
- Founded: 1904
- Consecrated: 20 July 1904

Architecture
- Functional status: Active
- Architect: Holger Sinding-Larsen
- Architectural type: Long church
- Completed: 1904 (122 years ago)

Specifications
- Capacity: 200
- Materials: Wood

Administration
- Diocese: Tunsberg
- Deanery: Nord-Jarlsberg prosti
- Parish: Hof, Vassås og Eidsfoss
- Norwegian Cultural Heritage Site
- Type: Church
- Status: Listed
- ID: 84072

Eidsfoss Church (Norwegian: Eidsfoss kirke) is a parish church of the Church of Norway in Holmestrand Municipality in Vestfold county, Norway. It is located in the village of Eidsfoss. It is one of the churches for the "Hof, Vassås og Eidsfoss" parish which is part of the Nord-Jarlsberg prosti (deanery) in the Diocese of Tunsberg. The white, wooden church was built in a long church design in 1904 using plans drawn up by the architect Holger Sinding-Larsen. The church seats about 200 people.

== History ==
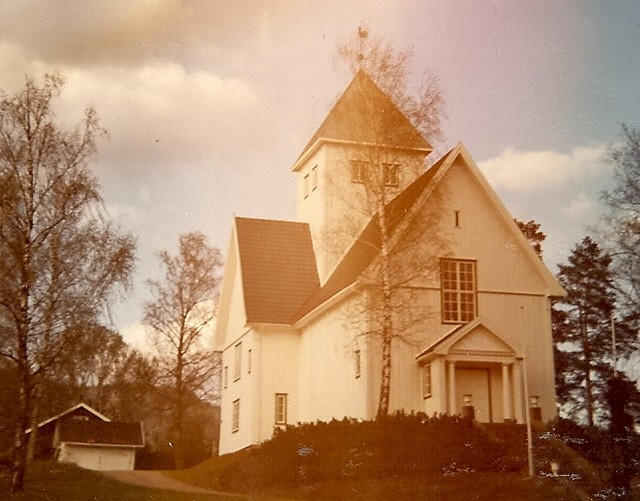
View of the church

The Eidsfoss ironworks company decided to build a church in the village of Eidsfoss at the turn of the 20th century. The church paid for most of the cost of the building and it was on donated land. Holger Sinding-Larsen designed the church and Andreas A. Kolstad was hired as the lead builder for the project. Construction began in 1903, but unfortunately on 30 November 1903, the unfinished church building caught fire and burned down. After the rubble was cleared, the church was rebuilt on the same site. The new church was completed and consecrated on 20 July 1904 by the Bishop Anton Christian Bang. The timber-framed church is often referred to as a cruciform church, and from the outside it may look like one. However, the pews are arranged as in a long church. The cross arms are actually sacristies with galleries above, rather that part of the main nave, so it is more like a long church than a cruciform church. In 1958, the ironworks company sold gave the church to the parish.

== See also ==
- List of churches in Tunsberg
