= Osøren Station =

Railway station in Hordaland, Norway

Osøren
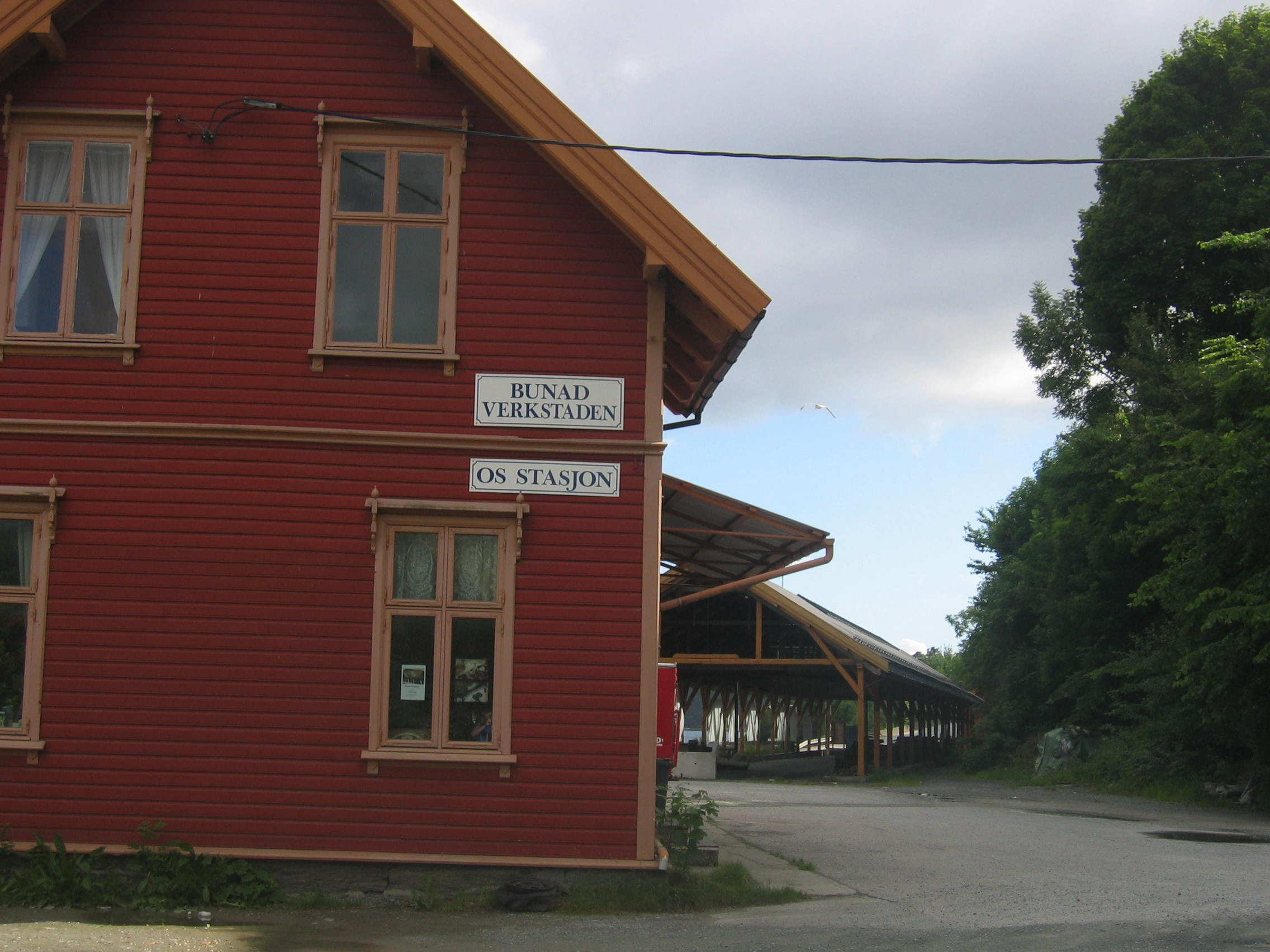
- Osøren station is now a heritage museum

General information
- Location: Osøyro, Bjørnafjorden Municipality; Norway
- Coordinates: 60°11′03″N 5°28′08″E
- Elevation: 3 metres (9.8 ft)
- Owner: A/S Nesttun–Osbanen
- Line: Nesttun–Osbanen
- Distance: 26.3 km
- Platforms: 1

History
- Opened: 1 June 1884
Location

Osøren Station was a railway station located in Osøyro in Bjørnafjorden Municipality in Vestland county, Norway. The station was the terminus of Nesttun–Osbanen from its opening on 1 June 1884 to its closure on 2 September 1935. After the railway closed, the station environment has been kept as a heritage railway centre.
