= Eidsfoss =

Village in Holmestrand Municipality, Norway

- Village
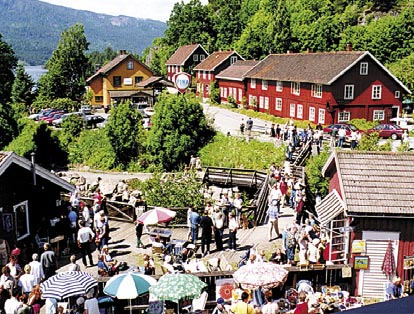
- View of the village
- Interactive map of Eidsfoss
- Coordinates: 59.59615°N 10.03595°E
- Country: Norway
- Region: Eastern Norway
- County: Vestfold
- District: Jarlsberg
- Municipality: Holmestrand Municipality
- Elevation: 22 m (72 ft)
- Time zone: UTC+01:00 (CET)
  - Summer (DST): UTC+02:00 (CEST)
- Post Code: 3095 Eidsfoss

Eidsfoss is a village in Holmestrand Municipality in Vestfold county, Norway. The village is located at the southern end of the lake Eikeren, about 7 kilometres (4.3 mi) north of the village of Hof and about 20 kilometres (12 mi) southeast of the village of Vestfossen (in Øvre Eiker Municipality). The village itself is mostly located on a small isthmus of land between two lakes, with a river connecting them.

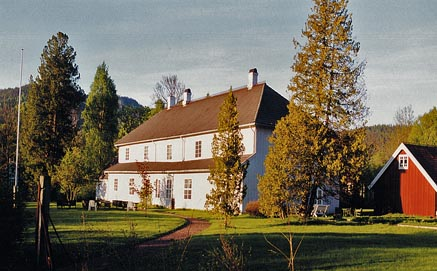
Eidsfos Manor

== History ==
The village was the site of the Eidsfos Iron Works (Eidsfos Jernverk) which was first built in 1697. The ironworks was closed in 1873. The village is also the location of the historic Eidsfos Manor (Eidsfos Hovedgård) where the owners and manager of the ironworks maintained residence for over 250 years. The manor house, which reflects both Renaissance and Baroque architecture, dates from approximately 1750.

=== Historical timeline ===
- 1697: Caspar Herman Hausmann enters into an agreement with Baron Gustav Wilhelm von Wedel (1641-1717), owner of Jarlsberg County, and oversees the founding of Eidsfos Jernverk.
- 1698: The first furnace plate is cast, depicting the nine buildings of the ironworks and King Christian V riding a horse.
- 1795: Peder von Cappelen takes over Eidsfos Jernverk.
- 1901: Tønsberg-Eidsfoss railway line (Tønsberg–Eidsfossbanen) between Eidsfos and Tønsberg is opened. This was shut down in 1938.
- 1903: The steamer S/S Stadshauptmand Schwartz begins to operate on regular routes on the nearby lake Eikeren.
- 1904: Eidsfoss Church is inaugurated by Bishop A. Chr. Bang (1840-1913).
- 1915: The first power station is commissioned.
- 1977: Authorities grant permission for the demolition of the workers’ houses on Bråtagata.
- 1979: The Old Eidsfos Foundation (Stiftelsen Gamle Eidsfos) is established, aiming to preserve and restore the old ironworks community. The houses are saved.
