= Eikeren =

Lake in Eastern Norway

- Eikern (unofficial)
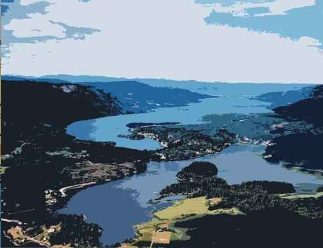
- Interactive map of Eikeren
- Location: Buskerud and Vestfold
- Coordinates: 59°38′N 9°58′E
- Type: Lake
- Primary inflows: Fiskumsvannet lake
- Primary outflows: Bergsvannet lake
- Basin countries: Norway
- Max. length: 16 kilometres (9.9 mi)
- Max. width: 2.5 kilometres (1.6 mi)
- Surface area: 27.6 km^{2} (10.7 sq mi)
- Average depth: 158 metres (518 ft)
- Surface elevation: 19 metres (62 ft)
- References: NVE

Eikeren is a long, deep lake in eastern Norway. The 27.6-square-kilometre (10.7 sq mi) lake is located on the border of Øvre Eiker Municipality in Buskerud county and Holmestrand Municipality in Vestfold county (the majority of the lake is in Buskerud). It is the largest lake in all of Vestfold county, measuring about 16 kilometres (9.9 mi) long and 2.5 kilometres (1.6 mi) wide, and reaching a depth of 158 metres (518 ft).

The village of Eidsfoss lies at the southeastern end of the lake. At Eidsfoss, water flows into the lake from the nearby lakes Bergsvann, Vikevann, Haugestadvann and Hillestadvann. Eikeren lake also receives water flowing into it from the rivers Hakavikelva and Steinbruelva. The lake flows out through a narrow strait (Sundet) on the north end of the lake. The strait flows into a smaller lake Fiskumvannet. Through this strait, water flows at an average rate of 7 cubic metres per second (250 cu ft/s). From Fiskumvannet, water runs out into the river Vestfosselva to the village of Vestfossen. The river then goes on to the town of Hokksund, where it splits into two rivers that both flow in the large river Drammenselva.

== Reservoir ==
In 2005, Eikeren was developed by the Vestfold Inter-Municipal Waterworks, (Vestfold Interkommunale Vannverk), in order to provide extra drinking water for Vestfold county. The other reservoir for the county is the lake Farris in Larvik Municipality. Vestfold Inter-Municipal Waterworks Authority is a company owned by all the municipalities in Vestfold county and it is responsible for water supply, water treatment, emergency power supply, and water distribution to the people of the county.

== Tourism ==
During the summer season, Eikeren is served by tourist boat M/S Eikern which runs between the villages of Eidsfoss and Vestfossen. The original M/S Eikern steamer was commissioned in 1861. The steam vessel Cappelen was built in 1880 and was used for timber and passenger traffic. In 1903, the steamship Stadshauptmand Schwartz carried regular traffic and provided a link between the Kongsberg Railway (Kongsbergbanen) and the Tønsberg–Eidsfoss Line. The current vessel M/S Eikern has carried traffic on Eikern since 1997.

== See also ==
- List of lakes in Norway
