= Vivestad Church =

Church in Vestfold, Norway

- Vivestad kirke
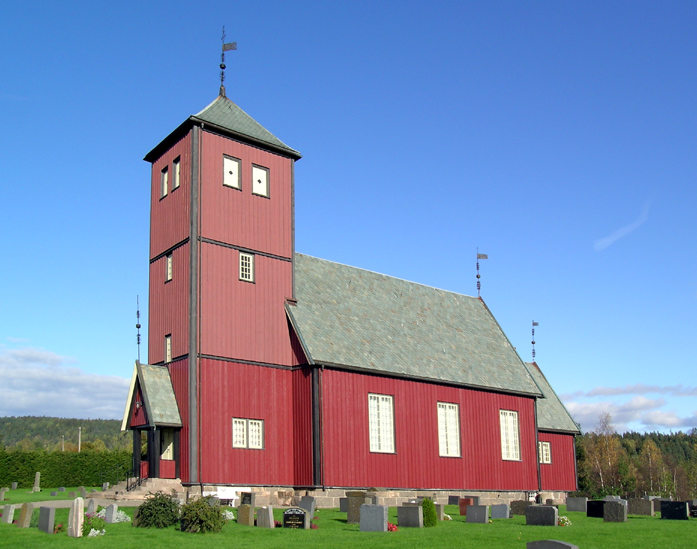
- View of the church
- Vivestad Church
- 59°25′20″N 10°07′59″E
- Location: Tønsberg Municipality, Vestfold
- Country: Norway
- Denomination: Church of Norway
- Previous denomination: Catholic Church
- Churchmanship: Evangelical Lutheran

History
- Status: Parish church
- Founded: 12th-century
- Consecrated: 1914

Architecture
- Functional status: Active
- Architect: Carl Berner
- Architectural type: Long church
- Completed: 1914 (112 years ago)

Specifications
- Capacity: 152
- Materials: Wood

Administration
- Diocese: Tunsberg
- Deanery: Tønsberg domprosti
- Parish: Vivestad
- Norwegian Cultural Heritage Site
- Type: Church
- Status: Listed
- ID: 85860

Vivestad Church (Norwegian: Vivestad kirke) is a parish church of the Church of Norway in Tønsberg Municipality in Vestfold county, Norway. It is located in the village of Vivestad. It is the church for the Vivestad parish which is part of the Tønsberg domprosti (deanery) in the Diocese of Tunsberg. The brown, wooden church was built in a long church design in 1914 using plans drawn up by the architect Carl Berner. The church seats about 152 people.

== History ==
The earliest existing historical records of the church date back to the year 1398, but the church was not built that year. The first church in Vivestad was likely a wooden stave church. It was dedicated to Saint Peter and Saint Paul. It is said to have been built near a spring that was believed to have healing powers. As such, the church was a place of pilgrimage until well after the Reformation. The spring is said to have disappeared at the end of the 18th century.

In 1628, the old stave church was torn down and a new church was built. The new log construction building had flat wooden panels covering the logs on the inside and outside. It was a simple church that originally had a small tower on the roof. Later, a large tower was built on the west end. The church had approximately 100 seats. In 1911, the church burned down, but central fixtures such as the altarpiece, pulpit, and baptismal font were saved from the fire.

After the fire, the remains of the church were removed and planning began for a replacement church. The parish hired Carl Berner to build the new church. He had measured and recorded information about the old church the year before the fire and he used this as the basis for the new church. Construction took place in 1913-1914 and it was completed and consecrated in 1914. The new church was a wooden long church with a large west tower (and a church porch at the foot of the tower), a rectangular nave, and a narrower and lower choir on the east end. The baptismal font, altarpiece, and pulpit from the old church were installed in the new building. The two church bells were cast at Olsen Nauen Bell Foundry in 1911–1913. The church was extensively repaired in the 1970s.

== Media gallery ==
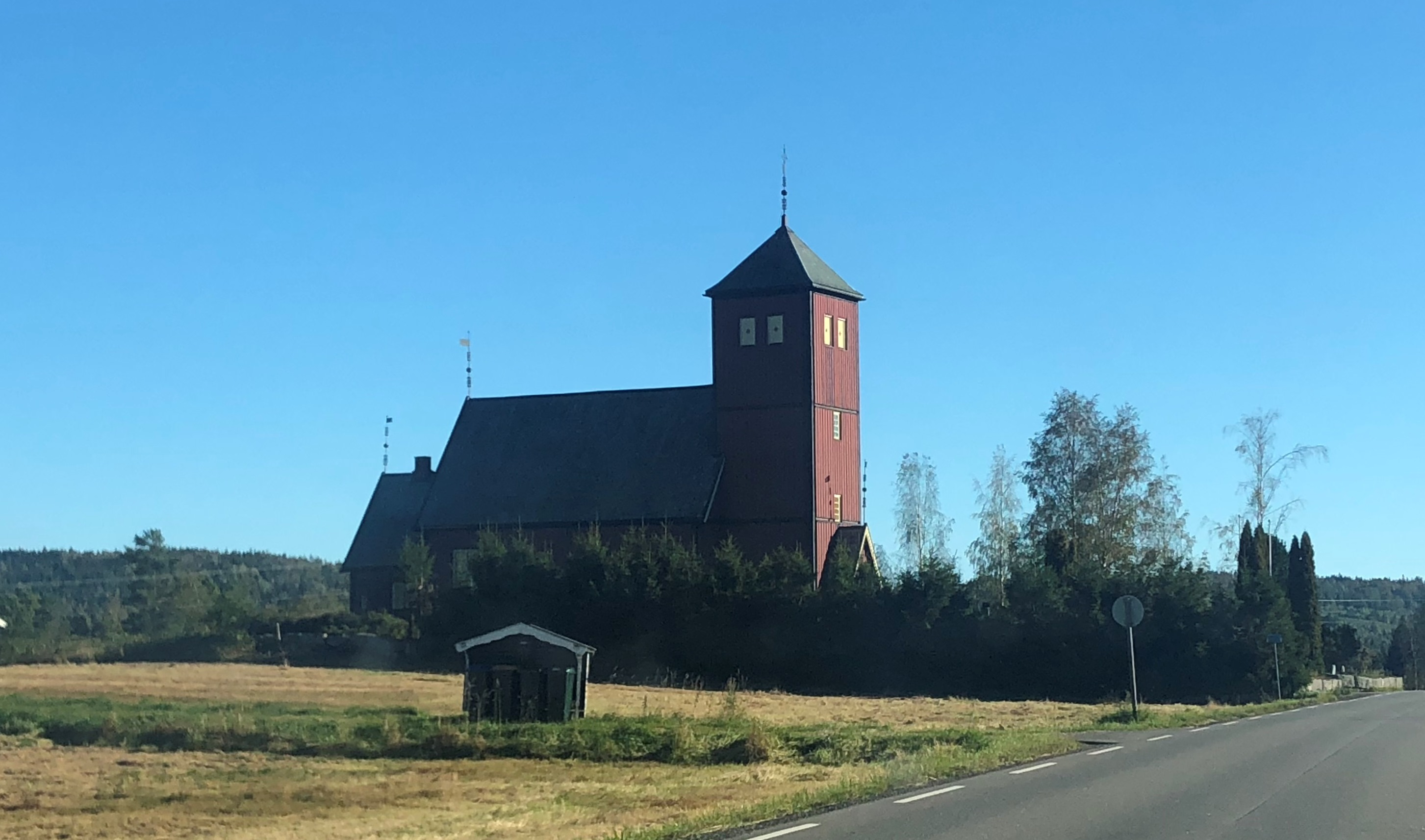

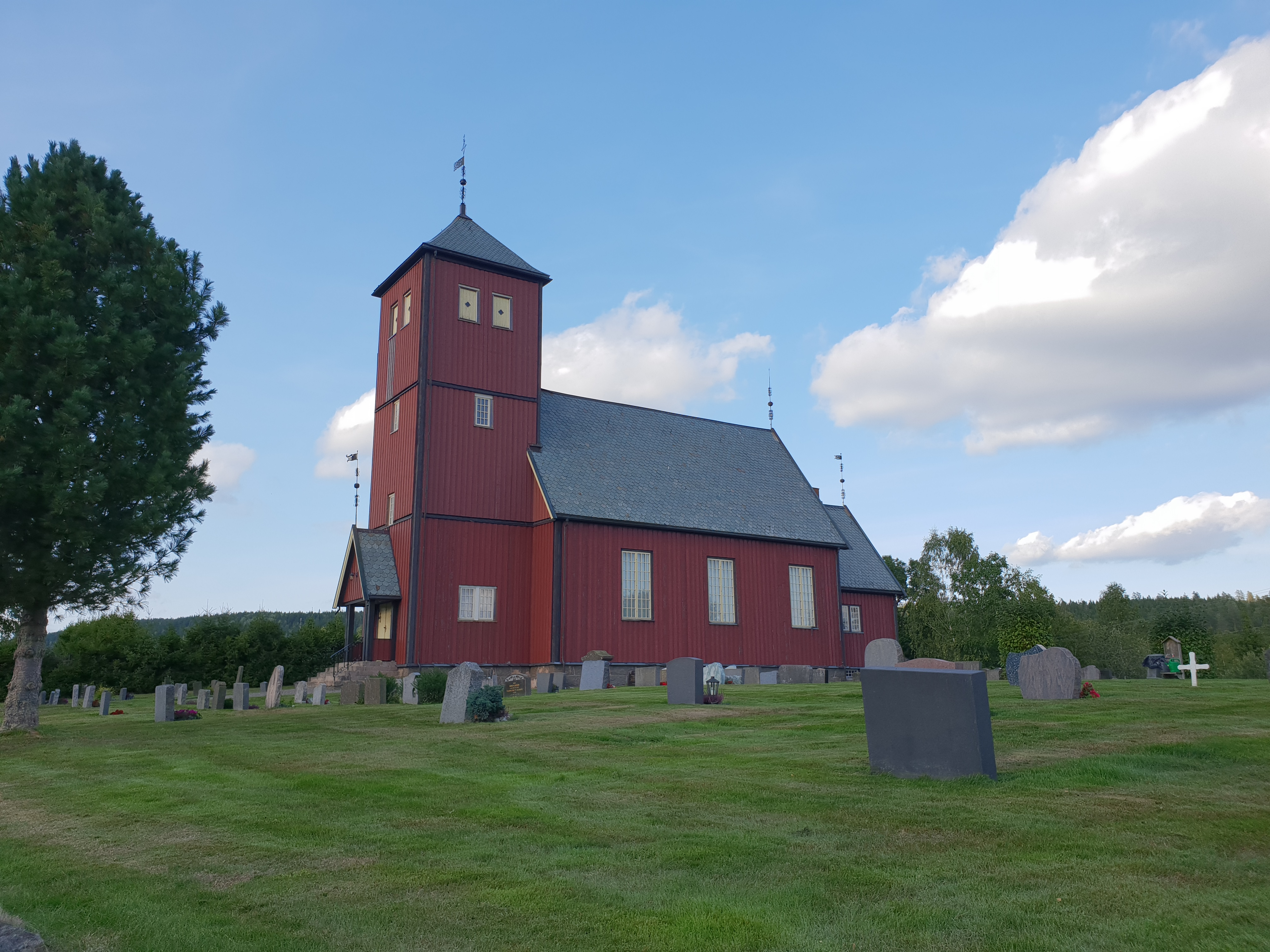

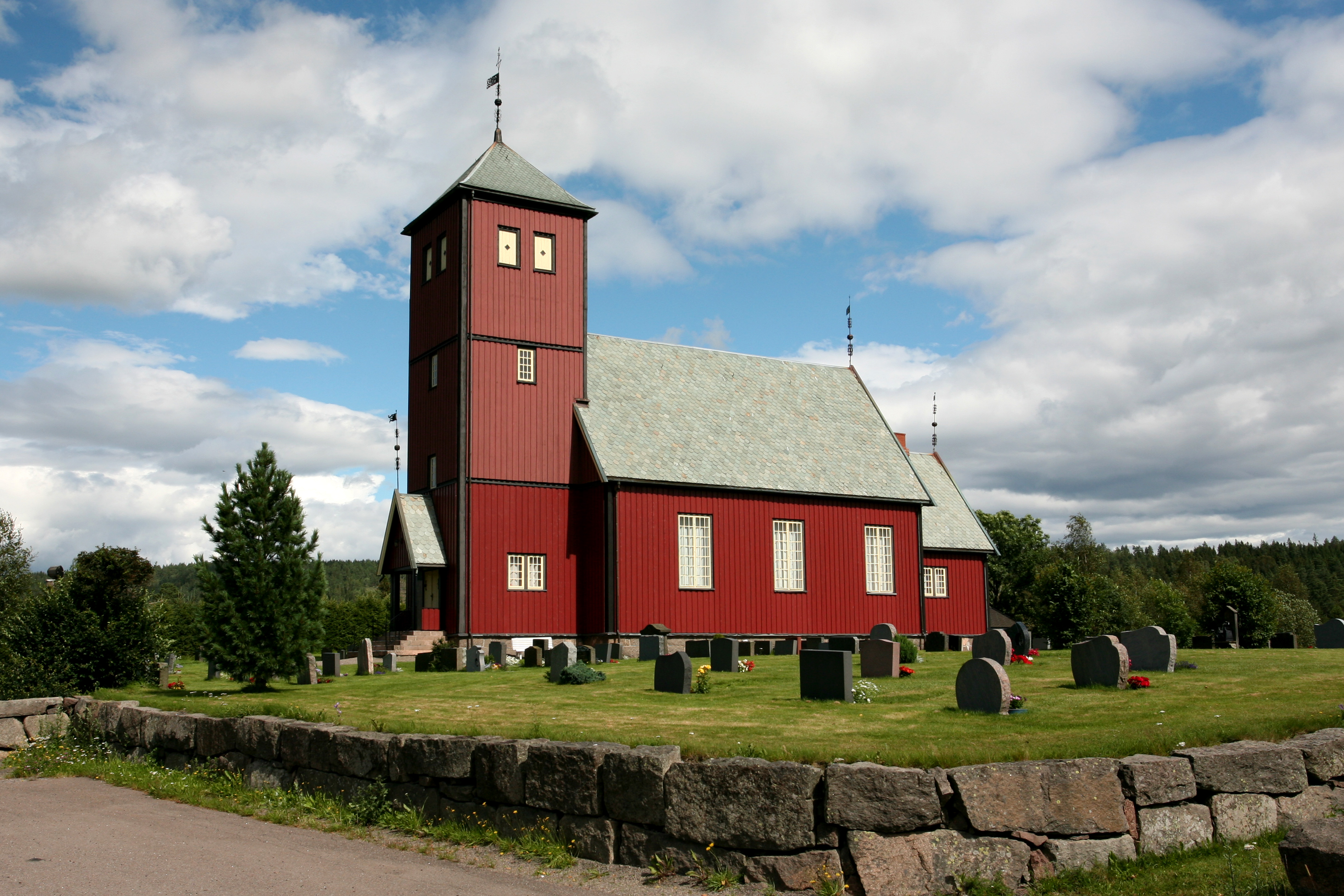

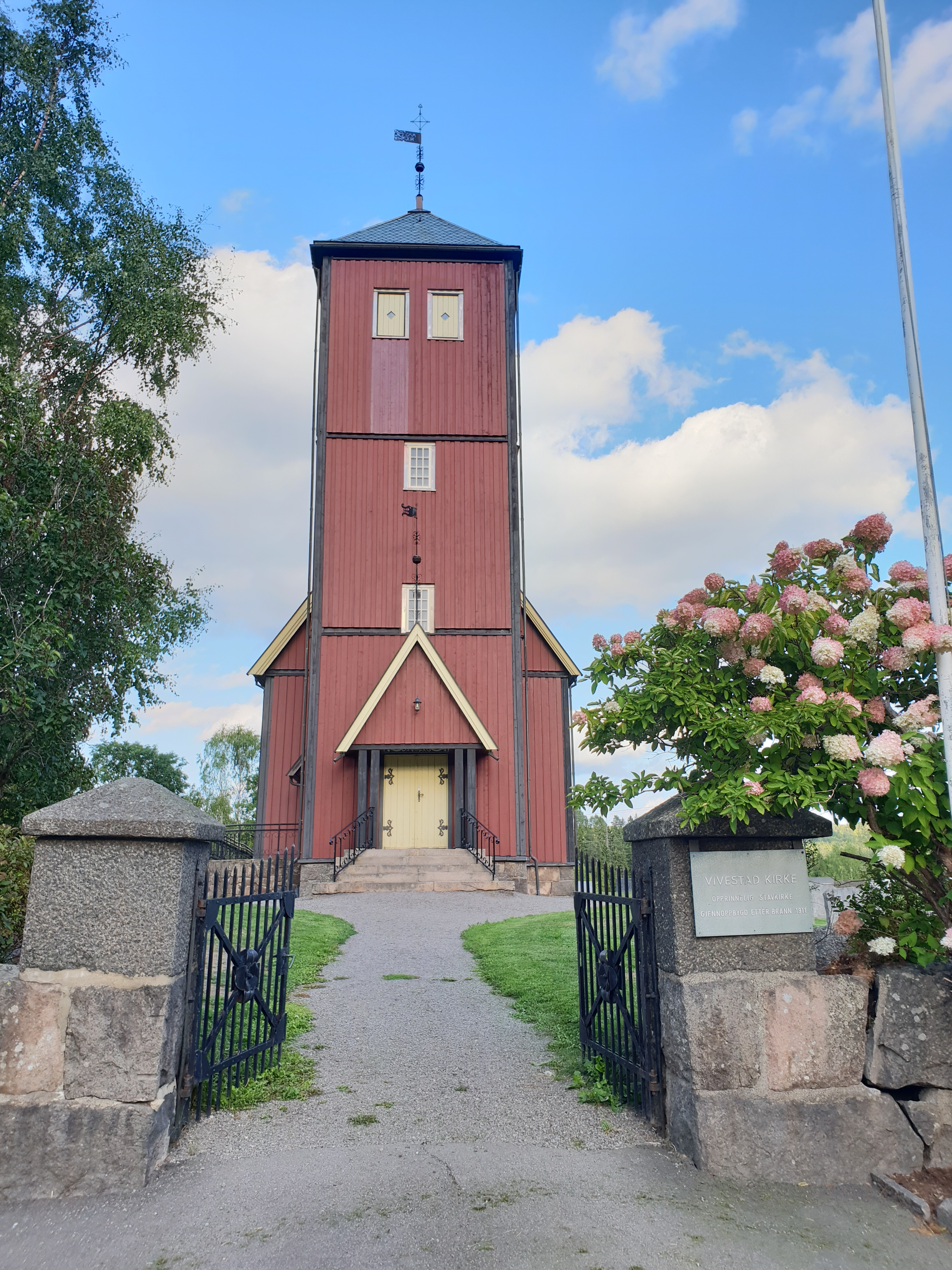

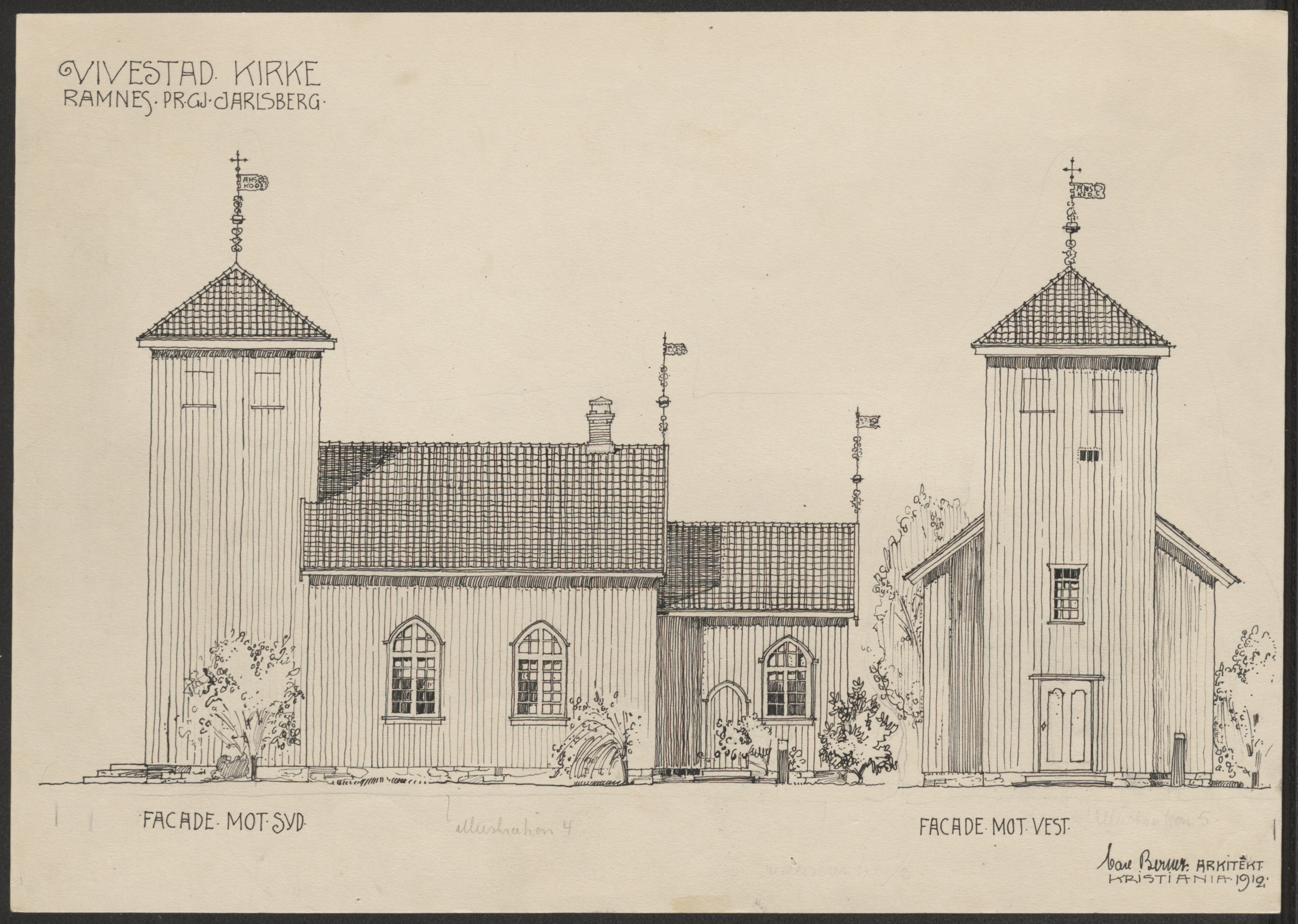

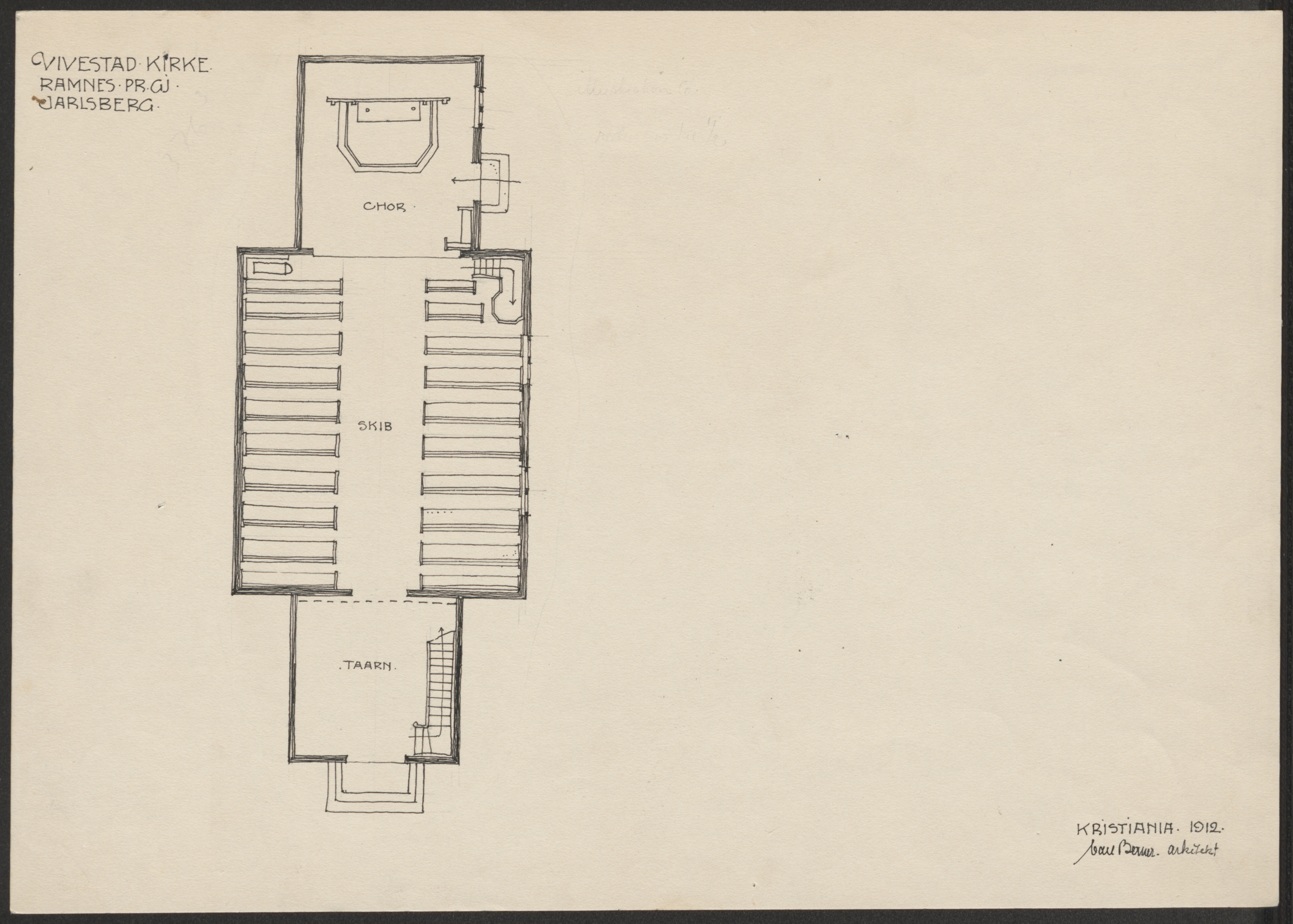

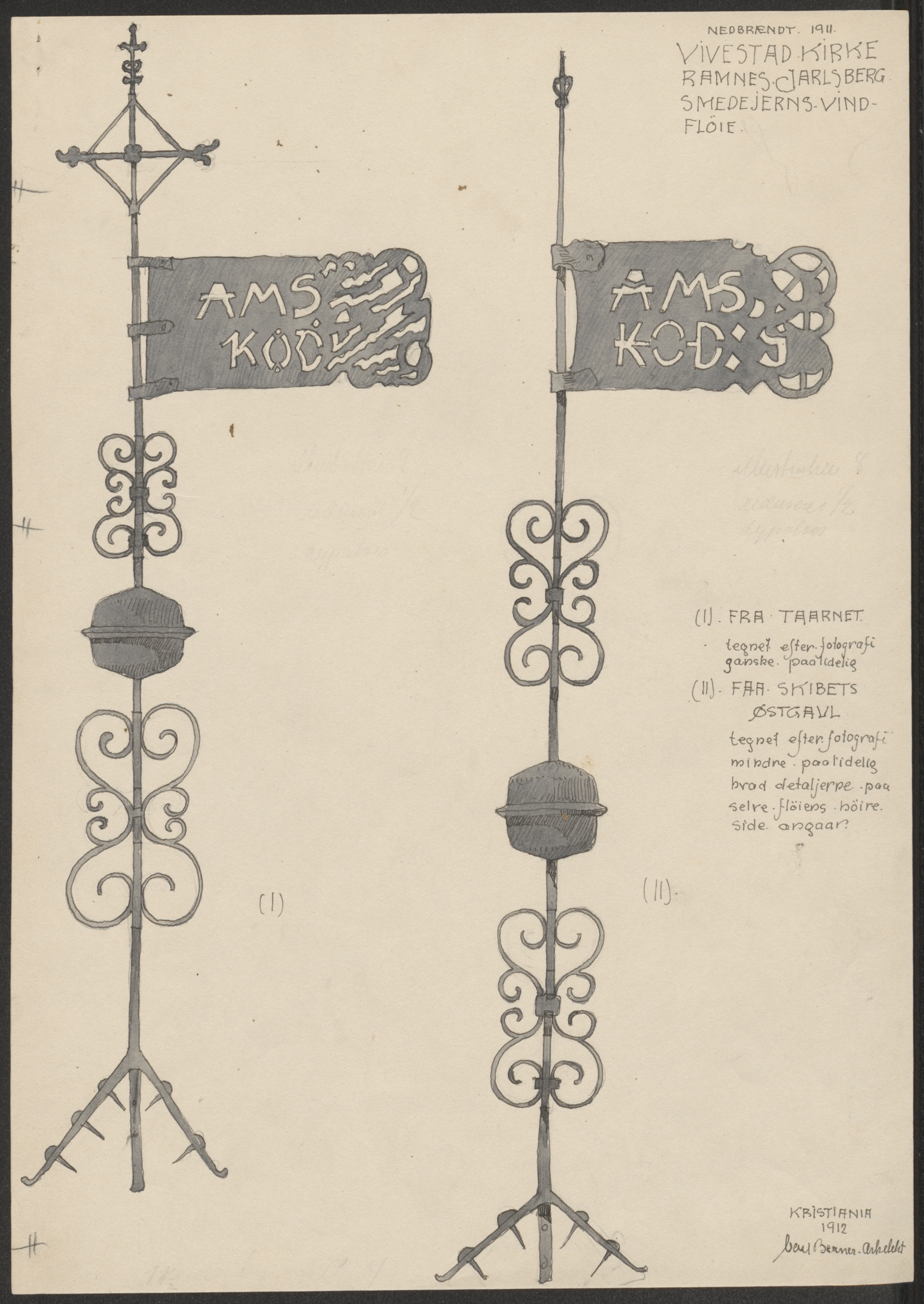

== See also ==
- List of churches in Tunsberg
