= Holmestrand–Vittingfoss Line =

Abandoned railway line in Norway

Holmestrand–Hvittingfoss Line
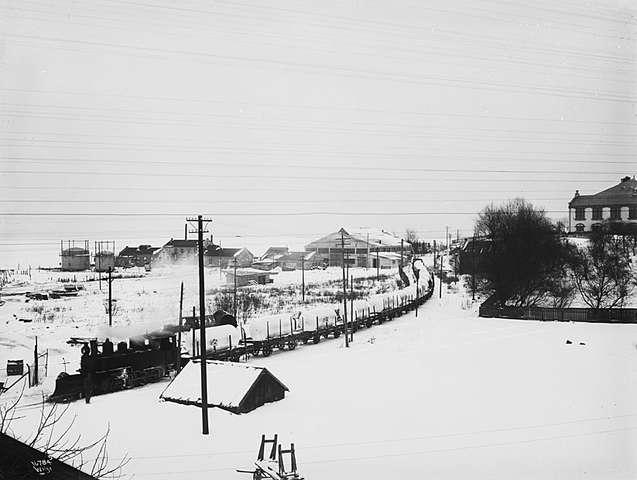
- Aluminum train in Holmestrand in 1923

Overview
- Native name: Holmestrand–Hvittingfossbanen
- Status: Abandoned
- Owner: Vestfold Privatbaner
- Termini: Holmestrand; Hvittingfoss

Service
- Type: Railway
- System: Norwegian railways
- Operator: Vestfold Privatbaner

History
- Opened: 30 September 1902
- Closed: 1 June 1938

Technical
- Line length: 29.80 km (18.52 mi)
- Number of tracks: Single
- Character: Freight of pulp
- Track gauge: 1,067 mm (3 ft 6 in)
- Electrification: No
- Operating speed: 30 km/h (19 mph)

The Holmestrand–Hvittingfoss Line (Norwegian: Holmestrand–Hvittingfossbanen) or HVB is an abandoned railway between Holmestrand to Hvittingfoss in Norway. It consisted of two sections: a 13.4-kilometer (8.3 mi) line from Holmestrand to Hillestad and a 10.4-kilometer (6.5 mi) section from Hof to Hvittingfoss. The two parts were connected by a 6 kilometers (4 mi) section of the Tønsberg–Eidsfoss Line. At Holmestrand Station, the line connected to the Vestfold Line of the Norwegian State Railways. HVB was opened on 30 September 1902 and closed on 1 June 1938. The main purpose of the line was the transport of wood pulp at Hvittingfoss, although it was also used for passenger transport until 1931.

== Route ==
The 30-kilometre (19 mi) narrow gauge railway executed a steep climb from Holmestrand to Hvittingfoss. It had a maximum gradient of 2.5 percent, a minimum curve radius of 100 metres (330 ft) and a track weight of 17.5 kilograms per metre (35 lb/yd). At Holmestrand, the line followed a zig-zag pattern up the hill, forcing the trains to back into Holmestand Station. Located up from Holmestrand is a 300 metres (980 ft)—the only on the line. From Holmestrand to Hillestad, the line is 13.4 kilometers (8.3 mi). There, it runs concurrently with the Tønsberg–Eidsfoss Line for 6 kilometers (4 mi), before splitting again at Hof and running 10.4 kilometers (6.5 mi) to Hvittingfoss.

In Holmestrand there was a spur to Nordisk Aluminium, which remained in use as a branch of the Vestfold Line until 1984.

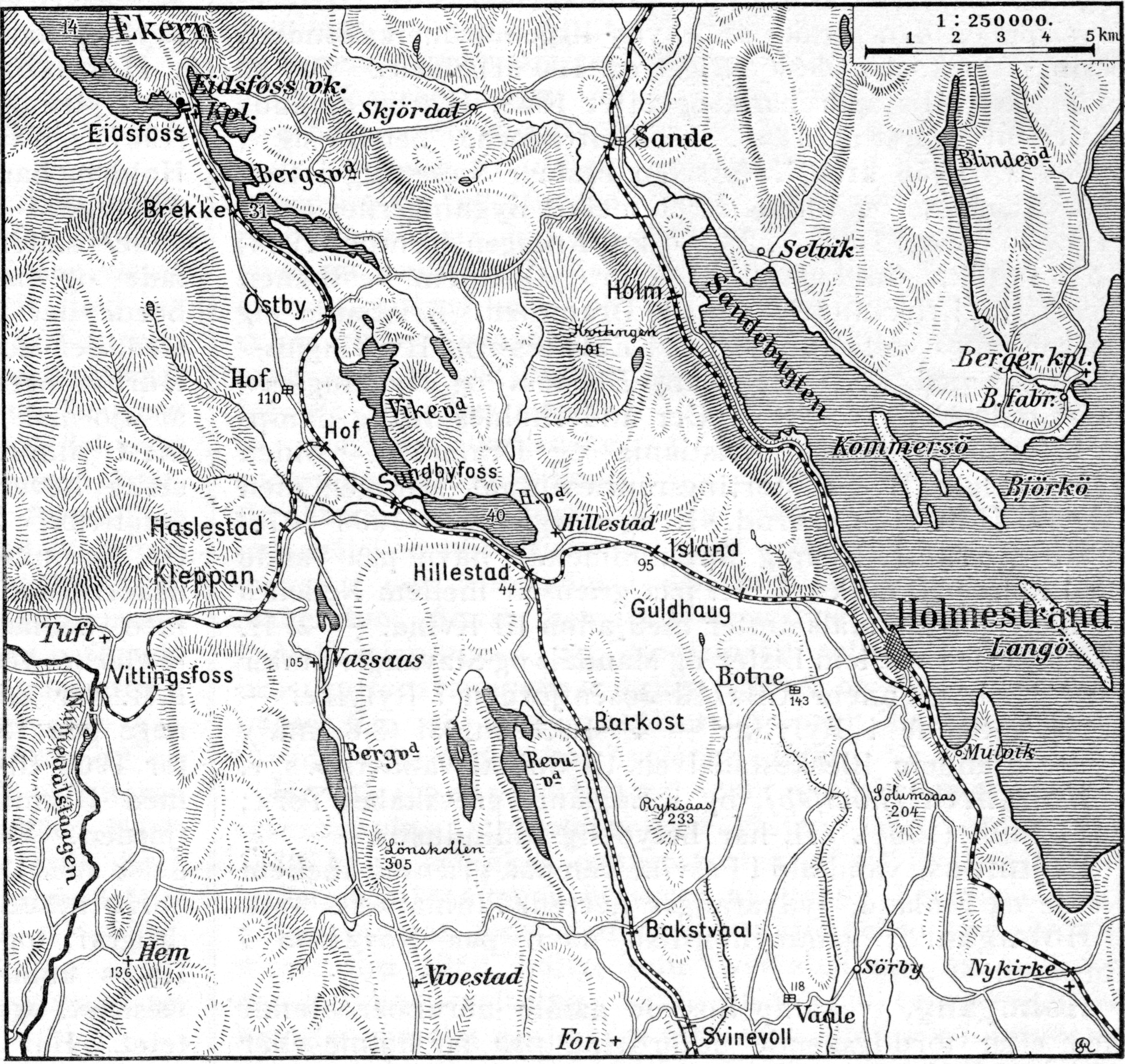
Map from 1910 which shows the line's route

In Holmestrand, the locomotive shed is still in use, although urban growth has removed all other remnants of the line. The right-of-way out of town is used as a suburban street. The tunnel has fallen into disuse, but from there the right-of-way is used as a trail. Towards Hillestad the railway ran in agricultural land, which has been reclaimed. The last few kilometers towards Hillestad, the route is used as a forestry road. From Hof, the right-of-way is gone, but along the last section down to Hvittingfoss, the right-of-way remains as a forestry road. The station and freight house have been preserved.

== History ==
=== Planning ===
Proposals for a Vestfold Line arose in the late 1860s and accelerated through the 1870s. The county was split in where the line should run, with three major proposals: along the shore of the Oslofjord, along Eikeren to Eidsfoss and through an inland route to Tønsberg, and via Lågendalen to Larvik Station. The Eidsfoss alternative allowed the line to run through an area with good access to lumber, which the railway would aid export. The main disadvantage was that the route was 20 kilometers (12 mi) longer than via the coast. Other minor plans included a Svarstad Line which would have run from Horten via Skoppum and Svarstad to Hvittingfoss. It was mostly seen as a supplement to the Lågendal Line, should it have been built. The issue was not resolved until Parliament on 8 June 1875 voted in favor of a coastal route. The narrow gauge Vestfold Line, at the time named the Jarlsberg Line, opened in 1881.

Engineer C. F. Melby proposed during the 1890s that the Svarstad Line be built. It was proposed to branch from the Vestfold Line at Skoppum Station, the same station the Horten Line branches from. It was proposed as a minor railway with the goal of cheap construction, resulting in it being designed with sharp curves and steep gradients. The basis at Skoppum allowed the shortest distance to a coastal station. The line was proposed run along Undrumsdal, Fosaas, through Fossan, Firing, Holt, Sjuve, Vivestad and Vassås before reaching Svarstad. IT would then have run north through Lågendalen to Hvittingfoss. This gave a not too complicated construction, allowing costs to be low. The line received support in Horten, and with a single decisive vote the municipal council voted in favor of a NOK 150,000 grant of the total NOK 1.4 million in estimated construction costs. However, it met little support in other political bodies and was soon scrapped.

Instead a shorter line from Holmestrand to Hvittingfoss was favored. The main incentive to build a railway was caused by Vittingfoss Brug. The pulp mill had been established by Andrers Olai Handeborg in 1872. Although located in a good location in relation to power and access to lumber, its interior location made transport of the pulp difficult. It bought a steam tractor in 1874, but the poor road quality made it difficult to use and it was soon abandoned. The company therefore started arguing that it needed a railway. Handeborg lost most of his fortune in the stock market crash of 1899 and the mill was taken over by the banks. In 1902 they sold it to the British publisher Edward Lloyd and the company took the name Vittingfoss Bruk.

Demands for a railway to Hvittingfoss came as a response to the planning of the Tønsberg–Eidsfoss Line. From the point of view of interests from Holmestrand, they were worried that the town would lose its surrounding area to Tønsberg, and hence its basis for trade. A committee was created, consisting of Birch, N. G. Berg and Chr. Bettum. They concluded that they railway should be built as cheap as possible, and proposed that 750 mm (2 ft 5 1/2 in) gauge be used. This would cause a break of gauge in Holmestrand, but the committee argued that nearly all traffic would be transferred to boats at Holmestrand, so this would not incur much costs. Hvittingfoss Brug supported the narrower gauge, and offered to purchase shares forth NOK 100,000 if this was chosen. The committee further proposed shortening the line by building part of it as a rack railway, allowing for steeper gradients.

=== Construction ===
The railway was approved by Parliament on 24 July 1896, at the same time as the Tønsberg–Eidsfoss Line. The original budget was NOK 728,000. The line was to be built and operated as a private railway. Construction of the Tønsberg–Eidsfoss Line commenced in 1898, and this line was built with 3 ft 6 in (1,067 mm), the same as the Vestfold Line. Because HVB desired to have the same gauge as TEB to allow for a concurrency, HVB's gauge was therefore changed to 3 ft 6 in (1,067 mm) gauge. The alternative was to build the section with dual gauge. The issue resulted in disagreements between the parties, but in the end the pulp mill agreed to maintain their financing despite the gauge change. A proposal to electrify the railway was proposed, but the NOK 250,000 cost was not found to pay off and therefore scrapped.

The line was surveyed twice, with the latter being used for most of the construction. Two major alternatives could be chosen along the common section with TEB, with a line via Østbygden being discarded in favor of one north of Hillestadvannet. There was during the late planning stages a proposal to increase the minimum curve radius from 100 to 150 meters (330 to 490 ft), but this was discarded after the government would not allocate the additional necessary funding. One of the major delays during construction was the Innlofjellet Tunnel, which suffered several landslides, one which partially flooded the town.

Five alternatives were proposed in Holmestrand, which variously included sharing NSB's Holmestrand Station or building a separate station. The municipal council supported on 20 November 1900 an alternative with a separate station at the towns square, with a branch via Gausen to NSB's station. Estimated to cost NOK 43,000, this was the cheapest alternative. NSB opposed this, stating that it could cause operational problems for them at Holmestrand Station, but gave permission for the connection line on 26 August 1902.

Laying of the permanent way started on 28 September 1901. The construction cost ended at NOK 881,000, of which the state paid NOK 364,000. The rest was paid for by municipalities and private individuals and companies. With the increase to 3 ft 6 in (1,067 mm) gauge, a further NOK 100,000 was granted on 28 March 1896. The state increased its investments twice more as costs continued to increase, based on decisions in Parliament for a raise of NOK 74,000 on 29 May 1900 and a raise of NOK 30,000 on 20 May 1902. These increased fundings were met with equal increased local funding. A fatal accident occurred on 1 October 1902, when the final inspection was being carried out. The inspector had not been informed of an extra maintenance of way train, and he was run down while on the tracks. The official opening took place the following day, on 2 October 1902.

=== Early operational history ===
HVB and TEB signed an agreement concerning the operation of the concurrent section. TEB was given the operational responsibility, although both railways were free to use it. All transshipment was to take place at Hillestad Station. Both companies retained their revenue, while HVB compensated TEB for part of the operating and maintenance costs. This included that the two lines would share a sixth of TEB's administration costs, based jointly on the number of trains and the revenue from the concurrent section. Any upgrades to the section would be split between the two companies. Operational costs were split based on the ratios of the number of trains and the number of axles. If the two companies could not agree on the calculation, NSB's district chief in Drammen would arbitrate.

HVB bought tis first two steam locomotives from Krauss & Co. of Germany. They were numbered 1 and 2, and named Holmestrand and Vittingfoss. The company also bought three two-axle passenger cars and twenty-four freight cars. In 1902, Holmestrand was sold to TEB, because they had problems with their locomotives. The railway bought three passenger carriages, one which also had a second class compartment. Although it had a standard almost comparable to NSB's first class, it saw little use and nearly all passengers traveled in third class.

The railway had a mixed reception in the interior. On the one hand it provided a fast and efficient way to reach the coastal towns, but many farmers lost and important supplementary income after they were no longer needed to perform transport services for Vittingfoss Bruk. The first full operation year, in 1903, resulted in 19,446 passengers and a profit of NOK 1,556.71. The following year ridership increased dramatically, to 45,418. Also freight increased, from 10,887 to 25,820 tonnes. This caused additional rolling stock to be procured. New freight cars were built at Eidsfoss Verk and a new locomotive was built by Thune. Delivered in October 1904, it was also named Holmestrand, and was identical to a class being built for the Lier Line. Thune delivered the railway's fourth locomotive in 1909. By then the railway had 53 freight cars. The company had a profit of NOK 29,714 in 1910.

Transshipment between HVB and NSB initially cost HVB NOK 38.25 per car. The track arrangement from Gausen to Holmestrand Station caused operational difficulties for NSB, resulting in a new connection track being built. The new section also served Nordisk Aluminium. In 1907 HVB transshipped 114 tonnes of express cargo and 13,553 tonnes of regular cargo to NSB. HVB's cars drove a combined 8,042-kilometer (4,997 mi) on NSB lines. The annual amounts varied, with the express cargo following to 20 tonnes and regular cargo 878 tonnes by 1911. Then traffic rose, reaching 140 and 5,600 tonnes, respectively, in 1920. A peak cargo of 73,196 tonnes was transported in 1915.

Although HVB was profitable, TEB failed after the initial years to make money on its operation. There therefore arose a proposal for HVB to take over all operations north of Hillestad, and relegate the southern part of TEB to a suburban line for Tønsberg. The proposal came from the HVB's board, who saw the possibility of using existing crew and rolling stock to operate trains from Eidsfoss to Holmestrand. It would have increased the number of daily services from Hillestad to Holmestrand from two to four. The proposals was rejected by the municipal councils in Tønsberg Municipality, Våle Municipality, and Ramnes Municipality, which had major ownership stakes in TEB.

The passenger transport from Hvittingfoss increased until the 1910s, when it stabilized at about 50,000 passengers per year, before peaking at 90,910 in 1918. However, high coal prices drew up operating costs, even though the railway in part started using wood as fuel. The company had a deficit of NOK 30,293 in 1918. The next two years the ridership fell by a third, while the company's costs for fuel increased to NOK 80,424 to NOK 156,540. The company went with a loss until 1923, when traffic started increasing again. The highest profit, of NOK 61,602, was recorded in 1925. The following year Hasestad Station burned down in a fire, and the wharfs in Holmestrand collapsed because it could not support the amount of pulp being stored there. Freight traffic continued to fall in the following years. Patronage until the late 1920s, when between 20,000 and 30,000 passengers per year were transported.

A bus service through Lågendalen started in 1910, providing services from Vittingfoss to Kongsberg Station and Larvik Station. In 1923 the government decided to take over the route, in part as a compensation for the valley not receiving a railway. The responsibility was given to NSB, whose bus division started a route from Larvik via Svarstad to Kongsberg. The main challenge was finding a suitable vehicle to operate the service during winter. The service included one daily route to Vittingfoss, which corresponded with the train. The route was not favorable for the railway company. The bus service gave little new traffic to the railway, while the railway fed considerable traffic to the bus service, although few passengers transferred between the two.

=== Termination of passenger services ===
All services on the line were mix trains, which resulted in long stops at station to load and unload cargo. Trains would be delayed, causing passengers to instead ride with unscheduled buses. HVB considered buying a railcar, and borrowed one from NSB, but found it was not powerful enough to get up the steep gradients. Instead the company bought a bus in 1925, which was to operate a single daily round service between Hvittingfoss and Holmestrand. By 1927 the company's deficit was increasing. The state guaranteed for NOK 18,000, but demanded that the remaining loss be covered by the municipalities. Costs were proposed cut by closing the workshop in Holmestrand. HVB attempted to secure a deal with NSB in which the latter would effectively subsidize the maintenance, but this was rejected by NSB. The result was that a few jobs were cut in Holmestrand and maintenance continued as before. Additional cost savings were carried out by reducing maintenance of the track to a bare minimum. HVB experienced a sharp increase of ridership to 51,442 in 1928, just to see it fall down to 25,000 the following year and to 21,157 in 1930.

HVB attempted to increase their traffic by reducing their fares, both for passengers and freight. The company also experienced that many shippers overloaded the cars. In addition to the loss of revenue, if the car was to continue with NSB, it was often required to be transshipped, at the cost of HVB. This was particularly a problem with lumber. An easy way to measure the weight at the small stations was not resolved until it was discovered that a correctly loaded car would just allow a match box to fit between the car's frame and bogie spring. The company therefore announced on 27 January 1931 that it intended to terminate all passenger trains from 1 March. This would give cost savings of NOK 30,000, as all employees who worked with expedition of passengers could be laid off, reducing the number of employees at intermediate stations from thirty to seven. The company would expand its bus service, which it expected to make a profit from. The trains could be optimized for freight timetables, giving additional cost savings. The bus was not delivered until September, postponing the termination of passenger operations to 27 September. The company was able to make a profit of NOK 157 in 1932.

The closing of the passenger train service received mixed reactions. On the one hand it was possible to reach Holmestrand up to an hour earlier, but on the other hand the ride was much less comfortable. This was in part caused by the road which had been built being 7 kilometers (4.3 mi) shorter than the railway, as it could allow for steeper climbs. From 1932 Hvittingfoss Bruk started a harder line in their negotiations with the railway. They contracted part of the pulp freighting to truck drivers, and demanded discounts from the railway company. This caused HVB to make a NOK 5,000 loss that year. The following year Hvittingfoss Bruk stopped sending any cargo with HVB, which had a dramatic effect on HVB. The company's board started intense negotiations to find new sources of revenue or areas to cut costs, and proposed both closing down the line and a merger with TEB.

=== Merger and closing ===
NSB carried out a survey to look into the future of HVB and TEB. The report recommended that both the branch from Eidsfoss and Hvittingfoss run to Holmestrand and that the section from Hillestad to Tønsberg. By then Hvittingfoss Bruk had been bought by Tønsberg Municipality, and to retain the transshipment jobs at the town's port, the municipal council insisted on that the pulp mill send its pulp to Tønsberg, rather than the shorter and more economical haul to Holmestrand. This was met with resistance in Holmestrand, as an estimated 44 people would lose their jobs and Viking Melk would possibly have to close down.

To rationalize operations, HVB and TEB were merged on 23 August 1934 through the creation of a new railway company, Vestfold Privatbaner. Holmestrand protested against the head office being located in Tønsberg and decided to not buy shares in the company. This further relegated their influence over the line and operations. Vestfold Privatbaner had a troubled economy, as Hvittingfoss Bruk repeatedly shut down production. The railway company's director thus in 1936 started the process of closing the segment from Hillestad to Holmestrand, and from 1936 only irregular trains ran on the segment. A youth fair resulted in several charter trains being run on 13 June 1937. The final revenue train was a series of half-completed freight trains which were being built by Eidsfoss Verk. Because of the uncertain future of the line, they decided to transfer production to Sundland in Drammen and the unfinished cars were sent via HVB.

=== Heritage ===
Norsk Privatebane Historisk Selskap was established in 1967 with the intention of establishing a heritage railway. It first attempted to establish itself at Kopstad Station, but instead settled for Kleppen Station. It was at the time intact with a full inventory, including such items as a complete storage of unused tickets. Several of the railway carriages were identified, most of them used as cabins. One person offered to donate two carriages, with original interior and coloring, but after a building permit was rejected he instead chose to burn them down. A representative traveled to Sweden, where he was able to purchase narrow-gauge rolling stock. Clearing of the line at Hillestad started in May 1968 and station building at Kleppen was attempted transported up to Hillestad. However, the truck carrying the building had an accident and the building was smashed. The heritage enthusiasm died out.

== See also ==
- Narrow gauge railways in Norway
