= Grimstad Line =

Railway line in Norway

Coordinates: 58°27′54″N 8°46′11″E

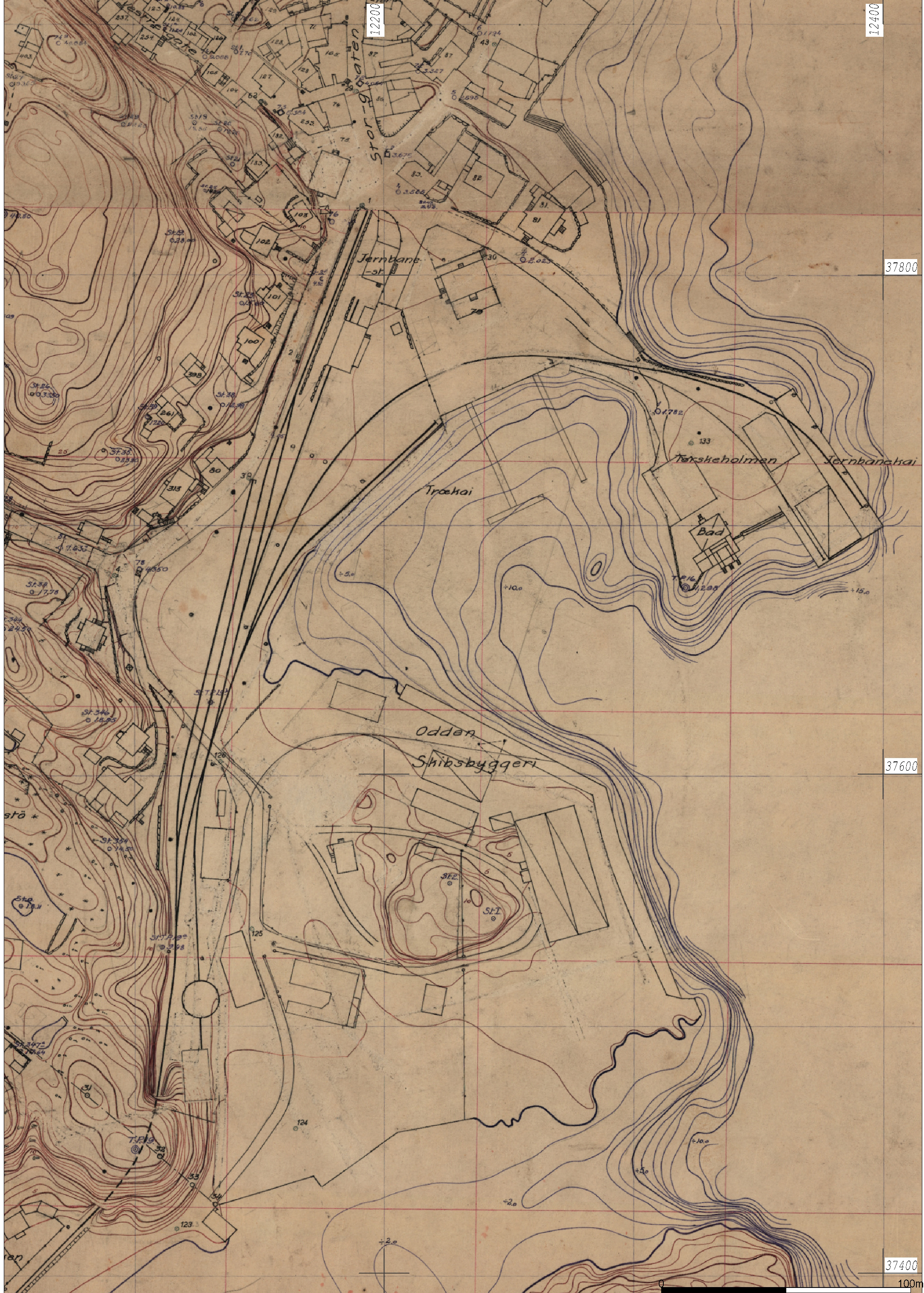
- Grimstadbanen

Overview
- Native name: Grimstadbanen
- Status: Abandoned
- Owner: Norwegian State Railways
- Termini: Grimstad Station; Rise Station

Service
- Type: Railway
- System: Norwegian railway
- Operator: Norwegian State Railways

History
- Opened: 14 September 1907
- Closed: 1 September 1961

Technical
- Line length: 22.19 km (13.79 mi)
- Number of tracks: Single
- Track gauge: 1,435 mm (4 ft 8 1/2 in)
- Electrification: No

The Grimstad Line (Norwegian: Grimstadbanen) was a 22-kilometer (14 mi) long railway line between Grimstad and Rise in Norway. The line was a branch of the Arendal Line, which is in turn a branch of the Sørland Line. Opened as the Grimstad–Froland Line on 14 September 1907, it was originally a private railway. The line was nationalized and taken over by the Norwegian State Railways in 1912. The railway was originally built with 1,067 mm (3 ft 6 in) narrow gauge, but was converted to standard gauge in 1936. Because of the cumbersome transfers, the line had few passenger and little freight. It was closed and demolished in 1961.

== Route ==
Most of the demolished route is either highway or bicycle path. Very few buildings remain; the main exception being the station building at Rykene which is a private dwelling.

== History ==
=== Planning ===
Plans for a railway from Grimstad was first launched in 1874, when a railway committee was established by Grimstad Municipality. The initial interest was for a 3.9-kilometer (2.4 mi) long line to the southwestern end of the lake Rore to the town center. In 1881, the section was surveyed, which included a 0.7-kilometer (0.43 mi) long branch to Naudenes. It was estimated to cost 200,000 Norwegian krone (NOK). In 1890, a 600 mm (1 ft 11 5/8 in) gauge railway was proposed along the same route, which would have cost NOK 142,000. An application to the Ministry of Labour for engineering assistance to plan the route was denied in 1892.

In 1874, Aust-Agder County Municipality (then Nedenes) established a railway committee as a response to the national ambitions of creating a Vestland Line (later named the Sørland Line) which would connect Rogaland and Agder to Oslo and Eastern Norway. There was controversy regarding the choice of route; while many proposals existed, the two main was an inland route and a coastal route. Nedenes County Railway Committee supported an inner route, stating the large amount of lumber which was logged in the interior parts of the county, and which depreciated in value during log driving—which could take up to three years.

During the early 1880s, Norway fell into a recession and railway construction halted. By 1884, planning of the Vestland Line had halted, and instead municipalities started planning lines which would connect the coastal towns to inland lakes. The hope was that if an inland line was later built, these would also act as branch lines, giving the towns railway connections to the capital. In Nordenes, it was proposed that both Arendal and Grimstad would have a branch line, which would connect somewhere north of towns, and continue northwards into the interior. In 1891, an agreement was reached between local politicians to build a line from the lake Nisser through Åmli Municipality and Moripen to Messel, where the line would branch to Grimstad and Arendal. Originally the proposal had called for the branching to occur even closer to the coast, at Rykene. Representatives from Arendal wanted an even further away branching point, and proposed Bøylestad.

In 1892, the Ministry of Labour proposed several lines in the area. One went from Grimstad via Arendal to Nisser via Nelaug, the other were the Kragerø Line and a line connecting to Risør. It was followed up by a proposal for a line from Kongsberg—then terminus of the Sørland Line—to Grovane, which had a railway to Kristiansand. The proposed line would have branches to Skien, Kragerø, Arendal, Åmli, Risør, Grimtad, Tvedestrand and Notodden. In 1893, the proposal was rejected by the Parliament of Norway, although the section from Arendal to Åmli was approved.

Work on planning the Grimstad Line continued with proposals to extend the line further. Following the decision to build the Arendal–Åmli Line, plans were made for the Grimstad Line to connect to the other line at Messel. In a meeting for various local politicians on 20 May 1895, it was decided to create a committee which was given permission to apply for a concession to build a railway. Two days later, at a new meeting, the committee was given permission to extend the line to Blakstad Bridge. The line was estimated to cost NOK 800,000, of which the municipalities and counties would cover half the costs. An application to the ministry was sent following a new meeting on 31 May.

Parliament voted on 20 May 1899 to give a grant of 368,000 to the Grimstad Line if it received concession. Half was to be given as a loan without interest and installments, half as share capital in the limited company which would be established to build and operate the line. The proposal was passed with 71 against 36 votes, with the minority arguing that it would upset the balance in the compromise which had been made in 1894 for a series of railway lines throughout the country. The plans for the line were based on the Lillesand–Flaksvand Line, resulting in a curve radius of 70 meters (230 ft). The rolling stock would be the same, with the Grimstad Line needing two locomotives, six carriages with a total 114 seats, four boxcars and thirty lumber cars.

Rudolf Krum was hired as chief engineer, while the state appointed Jonas Lund as auditing engineer. Lund immediately proposed shortening the line with 2 kilometers (1.2 mi) by letting the line between Spedalen and Grimstad run via Vikkilen instead of via Rore, but this was rejected by other involved parties. In January 1900, Krum launched four plans for the station in Grimstad, all which would involve it being located at the port. However, it was then proposed that the station itself be located on a cheaper lot and that a branch instead be built to the port. After much local debate, the municipal council on 20 June 1902 with 25 against 3 votes chose to locate it at Vestrebugt. The roundhouse and coal shed were moved further away from the station area.

=== Construction ===
There were four bids for the tender to build the line; Ingeniørfirmaet Strøm & Hornemann was the cheapest and was awarded the contract in June 1903. They started work in 1903, despite that a concession was not granted until 29 August 1904, with a duration of 30 years, on condition that the line be completed by 1907. A last-minute change to the route was also made to allow access from Rykene. Instead of being laid through Lammedalen and across Nidelva at Kroken to Lindtveit, it was laid south of Temsevannet and through Strubro. This made the line 0.76 kilometers (0.47 mi) longer.

The line was to be built with the same gauge as the Arendal Line; although it was eventually decided to be built in narrow gauge, this was not known at the time. Therefore, the Grimstad was built so that the tracks could be laid either with narrow or standard gauge. The minimum curve radius was increased to 150 meters (490 ft), the maximum gradient 2.5 percent and with tracks weighing 15 kilograms per meter (22 lb/ft). The maximum permitted axle load was 5 tonnes (4.9 long tons; 5.5 short tons). The line's six bridges were built by Vulcan and Moss Mekaniske Verksted. Strøm & Hornemann built all the stations, except Grimstad, which was built by Heinecke, while Rise was built by the Norwegian State Railways. The locomotives were delivered on 11 May 1906. A telephone line was built along the line.

Construction and purchase of rolling stock cost NOK 736,000, 38,500 over budge. The costs were divided evenly between the municipalities and the state. The line was finished on 23 June 1907, when the first train, with the municipal council and their wives, ran from Grimstad to Rise. The line was officially opened on 14 September. Ordinary operations started on 16 September.

=== Nationalization ===
When the line opened, there was no funding for operations, so the members of the committee guaranteed funds for their own risk. In June 1908, the company Aksjeselskapet Grimstad–Frolandsbanen was incorporated, with two board members appointed by Grimstad Municipal Council and two by the general assembly. Sigurd Berg was hired as general manager. To begin with, the line had two or three daily trains per direction. Travel time from Grimstad to Rise was one hour and three to seven minutes. In 1910, it was necessary to replace some of the ties, as the original ones had too low quality.

The railway saw significantly less transport than estimated. There was very little lumber transport from Messel, in part because a timber slide had been built at Rykene in 1902. The factory at Rykene also chose to build an aerial tramway to transport its wood pulp instead of sending it via the railway. Passenger traffic was limited on the inner parts of the line; particularly the detour via Rorevann was a disadvantage, as people from Fjære were 3 kilometers (1.9 mi) from the center via the road, but 8 kilometers (5.0 mi) by rail. From 1 July 1910 to 31 June 1911, the line transport 40,077 people, of which 152 traveled on second class and the rest in third class. The line carried 9,305 tonnes (9,158 long tons; 10,257 short tons) of general cargo and 45 tonnes (44 long tons; 50 short tons) of dispatch goods. It had income of NOK 22,531, but operating costs of NOK 32,000.

In February 1910, the company's board ask the County Governor to apply for the state to take over the line. The standing committee agreed that the lien should be nationalized, and initially gave a grant of NOK 17,500 to operate the line for 15 months, in addition to refunding NOK 60,000 to Grimstad Municipality. An extraordinary general assembly was held on 30 November 1911 where the company was decided dissolved and the assets transferred to the state. This occurred on 22 and 23 January 1912, and from 24 January, the line was integrated with NSB and became subordinate Arendal District. After being nationalized, NSB stationed a telegraph operator at Rykene, and increased the number of ties to increase the axle load to NSB's standard of 5.5 tonnes (5.4 long tons; 6.1 short tons). In 1924, the second-class carriages were removed, as too few people were willing to pay the 50% premium. In 1927, Cmb 13 diesel multiple units were taken into use, this increasing the number of halts. The stations Roresand, Spedalen and Lia were unstaffed in 1928.

In 1927, the Sørland Line was extended to Neslandsvatn and received a temporary terminus at Kragerø via the Kragerø Line. The next stage of the line was the extension from Neslandsvatn to Nelaug, where it would connect to the Arendal Line and use it to reach the coast. In preparation for the arrival, NSB had in 1923 proposed to convert the Treungen and Grimstad Lines to standard gauge. This was denied, but again proposed in 1928. The cost was estimated at NOK 2.7 million. NSB also stated that an alternative was to close the line north of Nelaug and the Grimstad Line. In 1931, a new proposal was made, and finally a decision was made to rebuild the line from Arendal to Nelaug with dual gauge. By 1934, the proposal was changed so that the Grimstad Line was to be closed, the section from Arendal to Nelaug has standard gauge, and the northern part have narrow gauge.

The closing of the Grimstad Line was met with massive local opposition. The affected municipalities all issued statements opposing the closing and Grimstad stated they the NOK 90,000 in local funding for the Sørland Line would not be given. They also stated that if the line was closed, a series of improvements to the local road network would have to be made. On 21 June 1934, parliament voted to keep the Grimstad Line.

The Arendal Line was converted to standard gauge in 1935, and became the end of the Sørland Line from 9 November. This caused a break-of-gauge at Rise, causing transshipment of all passengers and freight. Work to convert the Grimstad Line started on 24 September 1935, with an average 22 people working with the project. The right-of-way had to be changed at the northern section before the bridge across Nidelva, giving the line a 128-meter (420 ft) curve radius. The roundhouse at Grimstad was also moved. During ten hours on 8 November 1936, the 24 switches were replaced, and the following day operations resumed, with standard gauge trains. To being with, a steam locomotive was stationed at Grimstad, but in 1938 it was replaced with a multiple unit. The line was transferred from Arendal District to Kristiansand District when the Sørland Line was opened to Kristiansand from 21 June 1938.

In 1939, the Grimstad Line had an operating loss of NOK 90,000, and NSB made an inspection to consider closing the line. However, the road from Rise to Grimstad was in so poor condition that driving a bus on it would not be feasible. Class 9 locomotives were introduced on so-called "small trains", where the fireman also acted as conductor. The class was also used on freight trains between Arendal and Grimstad. It would then back from Arendal to Rise, run forward to Grimstad, back from Grimtad to Rise and then run forward to Arendal. In 1947, the line received Kristine Valdresdatter, a multiple unit previously used on the Valdres Line. It had only 45 seats, compared to the previous 52 in Cmb 13. Kristine Valdresdatter was retired in 1955 and replaced with Class 87.

=== Closing ===
By 1955, the amount of dispatch good and freight had been halved since 1930, to 280 and 2,500 tonnes (280 and 2,460 long tons; 310 and 2,760 short tons), respectively. The number of passengers was also down, to 40,000 per year. In 1957, NSB's costs of operating the line was NOK 750,000 per year, while income was NOK 90,000. In a letter dated 28 May, NSB proposed closing the line from 1 October 1958, and received support from the Ministry of Transport and Communications. However, Grimstad would need new and better roads should it lose the railway line, particularly the road from Grimstad to Blakstad. Because it took time to organize a new such road, the date of closing the line was delayed. Nic. Jørgensen proposed having private operation of the line; he wanted to put railway wheels on two ordinary buses and run them on the line. This was rejected by the ministry.

The last train ran on 31 August 1961, and because of large traffic, a larger Class 86 was used instead of a Class 87 train. The passenger service was replaced by bus; the service from Grimstad to Rykene was extended to Rise, where there was transfer with the train. Demolish of the line started on 19 September and lasted until 21 November, when all but the last 100 meters (330 ft) from Rise Station had been removed. Rise Station received a new overpass, thus removing the level crossing. Part of the new road from Grimstad to Rise and Blakstad was placed on the railway's right-of-way. The Grimstad area received NOK 6.75 million worth of compensation roads.

== See also ==
- Narrow gauge railways in Norway
