= Nesttun–Os Line =

Railway line in Norway

Coordinates: 60°11′02″N 5°28′08″E

Norwegian: Nesttun–Osbanen
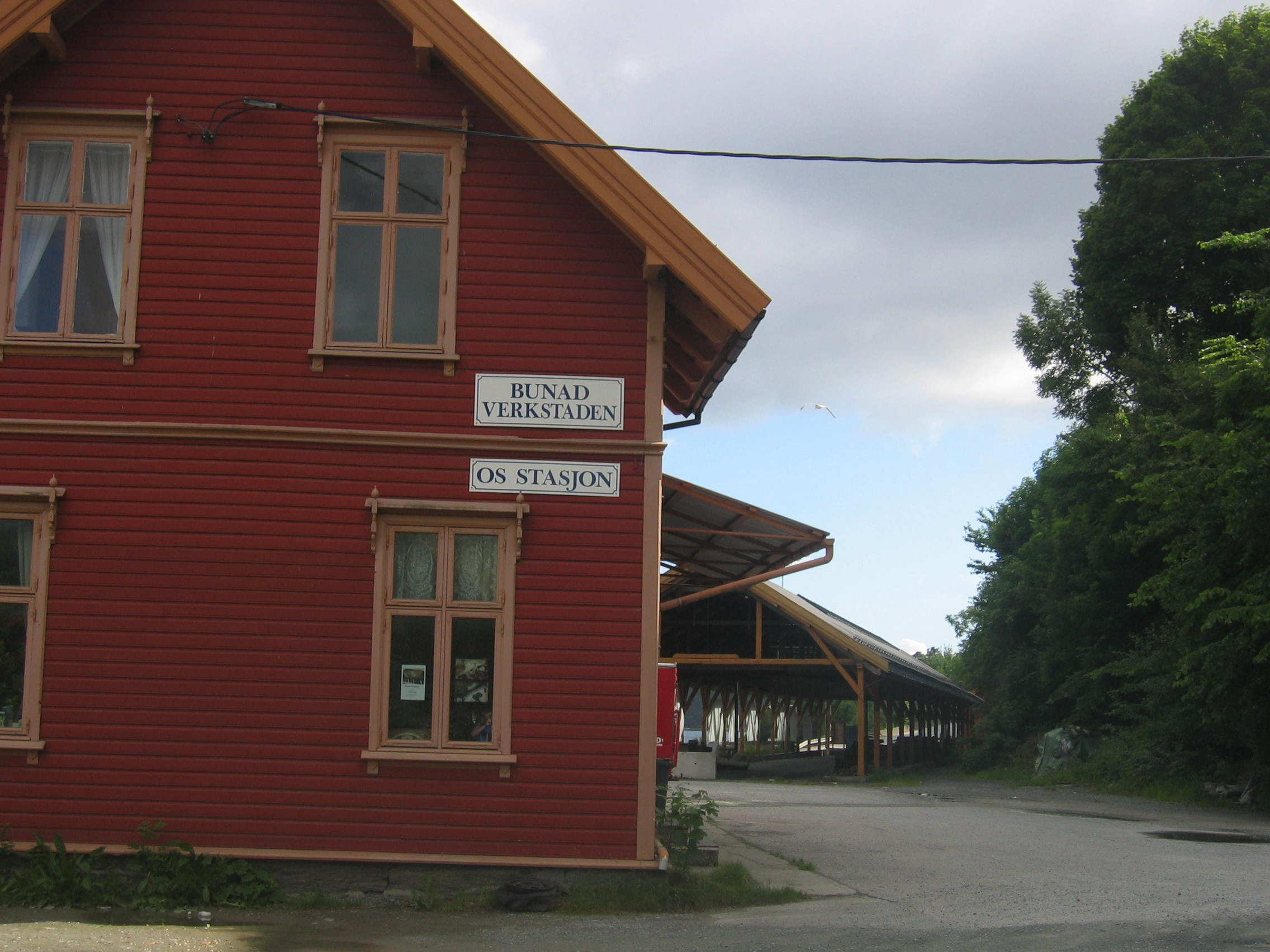
- Osøren Station

Commercial operations
- Built by: A/S Nesttun-Osbanen
- Original gauge: 750 mm (2 ft 5 1/2 in)
- Original electrification: None

Preserved operations
- Length: 40 m (131 ft)
- Preserved gauge: 750 mm (2 ft 5 1/2 in)

Commercial history
- Opened: 1 June 1894
- Closed: 2 September 1935

The Nesttun–Os Line (Norwegian: Nesttun–Osbanen) was a narrow gauge railway between Nesttun (now in Bergen Municipality) and the community of Osøyro (now in Bjørnafjorden Municipality), Norway. As the first private railway in Norway, it opened 1 June 1894, designed to connect Os to the Voss Line, allowing for passenger and freight transport to Bergen and Vossevangen. Despite a boom caused by World War I, the railway was eventually driven out of business by competition from road transport, which provided faster service. On 2 September 1935, it became the first Norwegian railway to close, and most of the railway was dismantled the following year.

Today, only short stretches of the railway and a few stations survive. Much of the former railway line is used as a bicycle path (rail trail), which makes revival of the Nesttun–Os Railway as a heritage railway very difficult. However, a 40-metre-long (130 ft) railway stretch remains at Stend Station, the only unaltered remaining station, upon which a diesel locomotive and a passenger car are placed. The station building itself has been restored and is used as a museum.

== History ==
Proposals to build a railway from Nesttun to Os were first made during the planning of the Voss Line from Bergen Municipality to Voss Municipality. Initial plans called for slightly longer route via Osøyro, Samnanger, Norheimsund, and Granvin. At the time it was required that local municipalities finance 20% of railways, and in 1874, Os Municipality was encouraged to purchase shares for NOK 8,000. This was rejected by the municipal council, and eventually the Voss Line was instead built via Dale. In 1884, a committee was established in Fana to consider the possibility of building a branch line from Nesttun to Fana. But neither the municipality nor the county were willing to give grants to the line, and, the plans were shelved in 1885. At the same time, the physician Daniel Schumann Krüger started to popularize the possibility of building a connection from Nesttun to Osøren (now Osøyro). At the time it was popular to build tracks along existing roads and use slow locomotives, and Krüger at first proposed such a solution, but later determined to support a conventional railway.

In 1884, a line from Os to Nesttun was estimated to cost NOK 885,000 plus land acquisition costs. Public meetings were held and in 1885 a committee was established. The following year, an application was sent to the state for NOK 3,000 in grants for preliminary work. It was presumed that the railway would be private, but the committee wanted to receive partial state funding. While the government favored the railway, the grant was a lower priority among the many proposed railway lines at the time. In 1888, an engineer from the state investigated the route, and recommended that the line be built via Rådal to increase the population which it would serve. In addition, Fanahammeren and Stend were regarded as transport hubs at the time. Following this, shares were issued for NOK 50,000 in the company, but this was not sufficient to finance the railway.

Instead of raising more capital, Krüger tried to reduce the cost. He proposed reducing the minimum curve radius from 100 to 50 metres (330 to 160 ft) and reduce the gauge from the 1,067 mm (3 ft 6 in) gauge used on the Voss Line to 600 mm (1 ft 11 5/8 in). This would allow the railway to have sharper curves and allow it to pass around any obstacles and hills, removing the need for cuttings and tunnels. Engineer Nicolay Nicolaysen Sontum started planning the cheaper railway in 1889, and he estimated the cost to NOK 500,000. After the project was marketed in the Bergen press, shipowners Fredrik Georg Gade and Johan A. Mowinckel supported it, as did major Wollert Konow (SB). An application for a concession was sent on 15 March 1890, in which Gade and Mowinckel guaranteed the necessary capital. This made Nesttun-Os the first railway in Norway to be built without state grants. The construction contract was signed with Sontum on 29 March.

The concession was granted on 2 February 1891 and had a duration of 40 years from the date the line started operation. The delay was in part because there was a debate about the gauge in the Parliament of Norway. The company opened for sales of shares on 3 March 1891. The largest owners were Gade (20%), Mowinckel (10%), Os Municipality (5%) and Krüger (2%). The municipality used a whole year's budget on the share purchases, and borrowed money to be repaid in 40 years. In addition to the share sales, the railway received free real estate from many farmers.

The railway was constructed in 750 mm (2 ft 5 1/2 in) narrow gauge, the smallest gauge ever built in Norway. The smallest curve radius was 50 metres (160 ft). This combination made it possible to avoid any tunnels whatsoever and the longest bridge was 8 metres (26 ft). But it also meant that all goods had to be off-loaded at Nesttun and that the railway had a maximum speed of 25 km/h (16 mph). The railway was of vast importance for the Os community, as it allowed for day trips to Bergen. The rail trip took only two hours, and was considerably faster and cheaper than travel by steam ship.

Despite a boom caused by World War I, the railway lost business to road transport, which provided faster service. On 2 September 1935, it became the first Norwegian railway to close, and most of the track was demolished the following year.

== Heritage ==
Most of the right-of-way still exists, although all the tracks were removed in 1936. In 1980, most of the right-of-way within Bergen was converted to a hiking and bicycle trail, and later asphalted. The right-of-way can therefore be walked 12.7 kilometres (7.9 mi) from Nesttun to Kismul. Along 6.1 kilometres (3.8 mi) there is a combined path and road, although the latter has little traffic. The section from Selsvik to Ytre Sandvika was converted to a bicycle path in 2002, and in 2008, the path was extended another kilometer (half a mile) past Kismul. The remaining section past Kalandseid has been regulated, but lack of funding has delayed the process. While hiking is possible, the path is overgrown and some places become a swamp.

From Kalandseid to Søfteland, the route runs next to European Route E39. South from Kalandseid, the route goes through private agricultural land towards Røykenes. In Os there is a section from Tømmernes to Søfteland that has been asphalted as a path. From Storestraumen south of Søfteland, about one kilometer (half a mile) has been converted to a gravel path. On this section is Bergstø Bridge, where 2 metres (6 ft 7 in) of track has been laid.

Stend Station has been converted to a railway museum and is the only station building to remain in its original design. In the 1980s, the building had fallen into disrepair, but from 1987, Friends of the Os Line started renovating it. It has a small display of artifacts from the railway, including old pictures, a film and items, including tools from the workshop. Outside there is a 70-metre (230 ft) long railway line. On it is a draisine from 1925, a combined third-class and post wagon from 1894. It consists of two half frames that were welded together, with bogies bought from Poland. It is the smallest bogies wagon in Norway. The station also features a water station. The museum also has a diesel locomotive which dates from 1967. It was used by Fana and later Bergen Municipality in the sewer tunnels, and was given to the museum in 1995. It features 750 mm (2 ft 5 1/2 in) gauge, but otherwise has no resemblance with the material used on the Nesttun–Os Line.

Os Station has been preserved and is owned by Os Municipality. Plans exist to renovate and revert it to its look from 1894, but lack of money has only resulted in the station being painted in the original colors. Plans call for a short section of track to be laid on the station area. The workshop has become the location of a sewer pumping station, although the exterior has been renovated to the original. The depot was built with decorative pillars, but there were built over in the 1930s. In the 1990s, these were removed again. Os Cultural Development has the rights to use the municipally owned building, and they have stated that they plan to convert it to a center for art. The building is planned expanded with a glass facade towards the fjord is planned, which would feature art workshops and ateliers.

Ulven Station also remains, has been modernized and serves as a private residence. All the buildings at Kalandseid Station have been demolished, except a private residence. The station area of Hamre Station has been converted to a turning spot for buses. Fana Station still stands, but has been renovated and modernized to the unrecognizable, and serves as a private residence. Rådal Station is in use as a private residence.

Two passenger cars are displayed at the Norwegian Railway Museum in Hamar, after they had served on the Urskog–Høland Line from 1935 to 1960. They are used on the museums Tertitt train that runs on the museum area. They were renovated in 1994–95. Os Municipality has a dismounted half wagon frame from an Oldbury wagon dating from 1894. A wagon frame built by Skabo in 1907 is in use in a garden at Kismul. It includes some original benches.

== See also ==
- Narrow gauge railways in Norway
