= Vestfold Privatbaner =

Norwegian private railway company

Vestfold Privatbaner was a private railway company which operated two railways in Vestfold, Norway, the Holmestrand–Vittingfoss Line (HVB) and the Tønsberg–Eidsfoss Line (TEB). The company was created in 1934 as a merger between the two former operating companies of each of the two lines, but Vestfold Privatbaner closed operations already on 1 June 1938.

== History ==
Prior to the merger, the Norwegian State Railways carried out a detailed survey of the business aspects of the two lines. In the evaluation of TEB, NSB was worried about the amount of traffic and stated that while traffic on other lines was rising, TEB was experiencing a decrease in traffic, which was characterized as "very poor", even by Norwegian standards. The importance of the line was also question, as it run parallel to the Vestfold Line and no station south of Hildestad was ever more than 13 kilometers (8.1 mi) from a station on the main line. NSB also argued that the line's utility was severely reduced because the line had never been extended to Vestfossen Station on the Sørlandet Line. NSB further criticized that trains running on the northern segment did not run the shorter distance to Holmestrand. NSB therefore rejected taking over the line and instead proposed running a bus service from Tønsberg to Auli twice per day.

NSB was more positive to the upper section, and proposed that the segment from Hoff to Eidsfoss remain, as most of the freight could be transferred to Holmestrand. This rearrangement would, according to the estimates, break even. However, local politicians were not interested in closing either of the lines. However, to rationalize operations, they merged the two railway companies to create Vestfold Privatbaner on 23 August 1934. It was given a board consisting of five members, one appointed by the Ministry of Labour, one each by the municipal councils of Tønsberg and Holmestrand and one additional member from each town, elected by the annual meeting. This was later changed to ten members, one from each of the ten municipalities which the line ran through.

As Vittingfoss Bruk was owned by Tønsberg Municipality, they had moved all transport from the pulp mill to Tønsberg, despite the longer ride and higher costs this incurred. Tønsberg Municipal Council therefore demanded that the head office of Vestfold Privatbaner be placed in Tønsberg. They also rejected any proposals to close the Tønsberg–Hillestad segment. Aldermen in Holmestrand disagreed and demanded that the head office be located in Holmestrand and thus Holmestrand Municipality decided not to buy shares in the new railway company. This resulted in the capital being limited to NOK 50,000, but secured Tønsberg Municipality control over the company. They therefore started planning to close the segment from Hillestad to Holmestrand. This was met with resistance in Holmestrand, as an estimated 44 people would lose their jobs and Viking Melk would possibly have to close down.

The financial difficulties at Hvittingfoss Bruk caused stress for the railway company. The detour via Tønsberg increased transport costs, and the director attempted at using trucks to freight pulp to Holmestrand instead of using the train. The factory shut down production several times, leaving the railway without its main customer. The railway company's director thus in 1936 started the process of closing the segment from Hillestad to Holmestrand, and from 1936 only irregular trains ran on the segment. A youth fair resulted in several charter trains being run on 13 June 1937. The final revenue train was a series of half-completed freight trains which were being built by Eidsfoss Verk. Because of the uncertain future of the line, they decided to transfer production to Sundland in Drammen and the unfinished cars were sent via HVB. The last revenue train to Tønsberg ran on 31 May 1938, which, caused by lack of proper maintenance of the track, derailed at Hoff Station.

There was little domestic need for narrow-gauge rolling stock in Norway at the time. NSB was in the process of gauge converting all its narrow-gauge railways to standard gauge, and had a surplus of narrow-gauge rolling stock. The only other remaining private narrow-gauge railway in the country was the Lillesand–Flaksvand Line, although Vestfold Privatbaner's stock was not suited for the line. Attempts to sell the locomotives to Swedish narrow-gauge railways were also fruitless. The only interest was a German railway in current-day Poland which bought locomotive no. four. Three locomotives, Tønsberg, Vittingfoss and Holmestrand, were sold to Norcem Langøya. Eidsfoss was, along with the Eidsfoss Station, sold to Eidsfoss Verk, and remained there until it has scrapped in 1957. By then the railway line at Eidsfoss was still in working order. Two freight cars were sold to NSB. Stations were typically sold to the owners which had sold the land to the railway, while others were bought by the respective municipalities. However, not until 1954 was the last property sold.

Norsk Privatebane Historisk Selskap was established in 1967 with the intention of establishing a heritage railway. It first attempted to establish itself at Kopstad Station, but instead settled for Kleppen Station. It was at the time intact with a full inventory, including such items as a complete storage of unused tickets. Several of the railway carriages were identified, most of them used as cabins. One person offered to donate two carriages, with original interior and coloring, but after a building permit was rejected he instead chose to burn them down. A representative traveled to Sweden, where he was able to purchase narrow-gauge rolling stock. Clearing of the line at Hillestad started in May 1968 and station building at Kleppen was attempted transported up to Hillestad. However, the truck carrying the building had an accident and the building was smashed. The heritage enthusiasm died out.

== Rolling stock ==
Vestfold Privatbaner operated seven steam locomotives and one railcar. Four locomotives were inherited from HVB and the rest from TEB. At the time services closed the company had 95 freight cars, of which 60 were in "good shape".

Locomotives and railcars
Name	No.	Origin	Built	Wheel arr.	Manufacturer	Ref
Holmestrand	1	HVB	1902	2-6-0	Chemnitz	
Vittingfoss	2	HVB	1901	2-8-0	Krauss & Co.	
Tordenskjold	3	HVB	1904	2-8-0	Thune	
Jumbo	4	HVB	1909	2-8-0	Thune	
Bjørn	1	TEB	1901	2-8-0	Krauss & Co.	
Eidsfoss	2	TEB	1899	2-4-2	Baldwin Locomotive Works	
Tønsberg	3	TEB	1899	2-4-2	Baldwin Locomotive Works	
Railcar	—	TEB	1930	—	Strømmens Værksted	
