= Tønsberg–Eidsfoss Line =

Abandoned railway in Norway

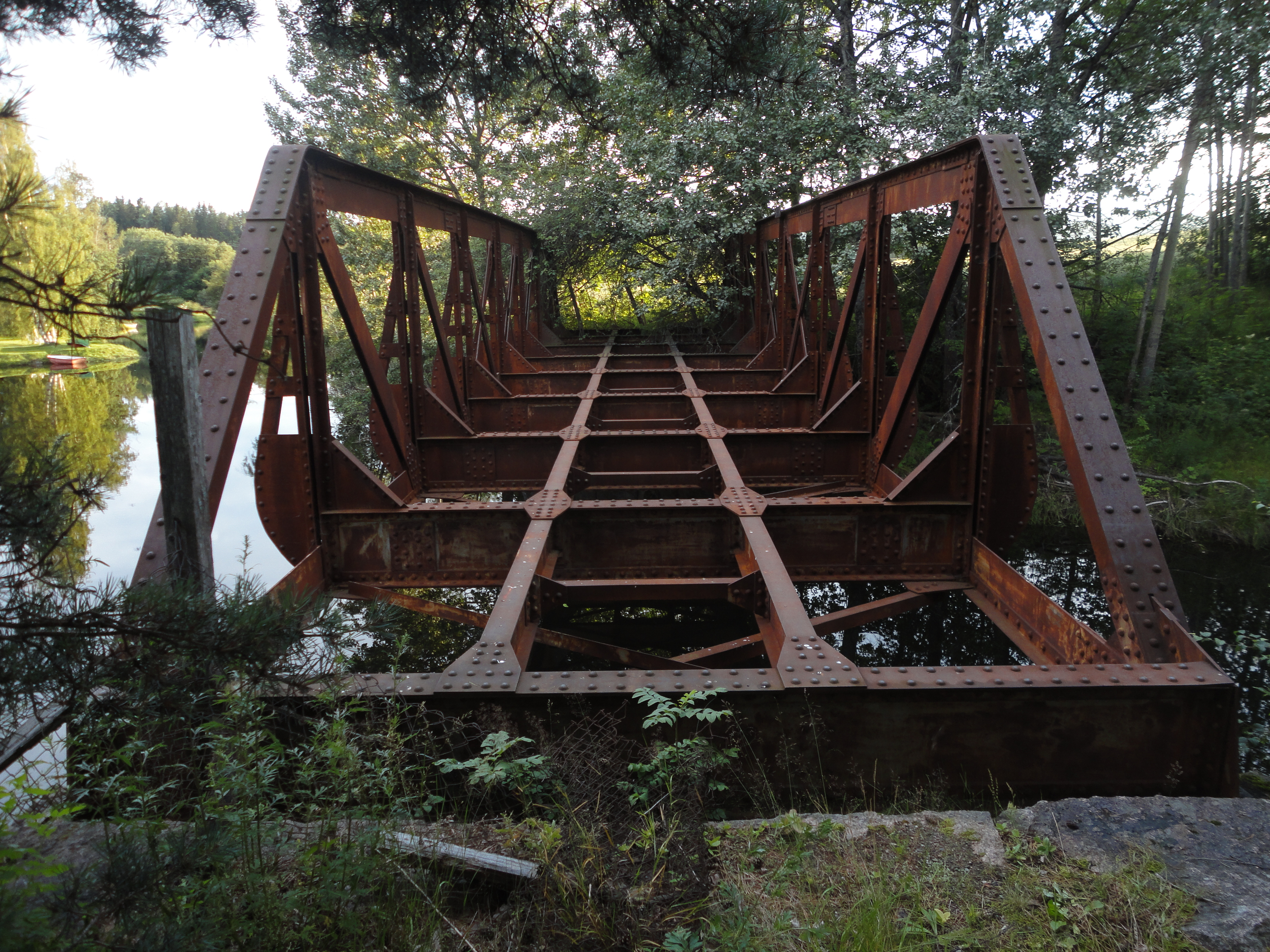
- Sundsbyfoss Bridge

Overview
- Native name: Tønsberg–Eidsfossbanen
- Status: Abandoned
- Owner: Vestfold Privatbaner
- Termini: Stensarmen; Eidsfoss Station
- Stations: 18

Service
- Type: Railway
- System: Norwegian railway
- Operator: Vestfold Privatbaner

History
- Opened: 21 October 1901
- Closed: 1 June 1938

Technical
- Line length: 48.10 km (29.89 mi)
- Number of tracks: Single
- Character: Passenger and freight
- Track gauge: 3 ft 6 in (1,067 mm)
- Electrification: No
- Highest elevation: 68.2 m (224 ft)

The Tønsberg–Eidsfoss Line (Norwegian: Tønsberg–Eidsfossbanen) or TEB is an abandoned railway between Eidsfoss and Tønsberg in Vestfold county, Norway. In use from 21 October 1901 to 31 May 1938, the private railway connected the area of Hof to Tønsberg, the coast and the Vestfold Line of the Norwegian State Railways. The main purpose of the 48.10-kilometre (29.89 mi) narrow gauge railway was to connect Eidsfos Verk to the mainline, although the railway also operated passenger trains. The line shares 6 kilometres (3.7 mi) with the Holmestrand–Vittingfoss Line (HVB), the two which from 1934 were operated by the same company, Vestfold Privatbaner.

== Route ==
The Tønsberg–Eidsfoss Line was 48.10 kilometers (29.89 mi) long and ran from Tønsberg to Eidsfoss, entirely in the county of Vestfold. The line was narrow gauge 3 ft 6 in (1,067 mm) and not electrified. The line ran through flat and easy terrain, with no tunnels or cuttings, and only three bridges. The steepest gradient was 16 2/3 per mil, the smallest curve radius was 150 meters (490 ft). At Tønsberg the line interchanged with the Vestfold Line, and along the 6-kilometer (3.7 mi) section from Hillestad to Hof the line shared track with the Holmestrand–Vittingfoss Line. TEB had eighteen stations. At Eidsfoss it corresponded with steamship services on the lake Eikeren.

In the original track configuration in Tønsberg, the line started at the post at Stensarmen, which was located 1.50 km (0.93 mi) from Tønsberg Station. The continued to Jarlsberg Points (3.24 km [2.01 mi]), where there was an intersection with the Vestfold Line. From 1915 the track arrangements in Tønsberg were altered and the Vestfold Line was placed in a loop through the town. The last part of the section to Stemsarmen became a spur of this loop, with TEB sharing track with the Vestfold Line for the return part of the loop. The new Tønsberg Station, shared with the Norwegian State Railways (NSB), was located 1.50 km (0.93 mi) from Stensarmen, but at a different location than the old station.

The first station after Jarlsberg Points was Auli (6.00 km [3.73 mi] from Stensarmen), which had the line's lowest elevation north of Tønsberg of 8.4 meters (28 ft) above mean sea level (AMSL). The line continued past Fresti Station (9.70 km [6.03 mi]) and immediately afterwards crossed the 20-meter (66 ft) Fresti Bridge. The line continued past Klopp Station (12.20 km [7.58 mi]) Ramnes Station (14.50 km [9.01 mi]) before running across the wooden 126-meter (413 ft) Valle Bridge. It then reached Revetal Station (17.00 km [10.56 mi]) and Fossan Station (19.14 km [11.89 mi]) before passed a platform at Bakke (20.00 km [12.43 mi]). Next the line went past Svinevoll Station (21.95 km [13.64 mi]) Baktsvål Station (24.90 km [15.47 mi]), Barkost Station (29.30 km [18.21 mi]) and then Hildestad Station (33.00 km [20.51 mi]), where it was joined by HVB.

On the concurrent section the line crossed a creek on the 20-meter (66 ft) Sundbyfoss Bridge and immediately afterwards reached Sundbyfoss Station(36.75 km [22.84 mi]). The concurrency ended at Hof Station (39.00 km [24.23 mi]), which was the highest station at 68.2 meters (224 ft) AMSL. TEB continued down to Kopstad Station (42.20 km [26.22 mi]), past a spur to Hoff Sag & Høvleri, past Stubben Station (45.40 km [28.21 mi]) to Eidsfoss Station (48.10 km [29.89 mi]).

North of Hillestad, most of the right-of-way has been retained, some of it as forestry roads, while other parts have grown wild. From Hof to Eidsfoss, the route can be driven by car. The station building in Eidsfoss was demolished in the 1960s, but the stone depot remains. South of Hillestad, large parts of the line went over agricultural land, and these portions have been reclaimed as such. The engine shed at Eidsfoss Station is preserved and has been listed by the Directorate for Cultural Heritage. The section of the Tønsberg–Eidsfoss Line between Tønsberg Station and Stensarmen remained used as a spur to the port until 1980.

== History ==
=== Planning ===
Proposals for a Vestfold Line arose in the late 1860s and accelerated through the 1870s. The county was split in where the line should run, with three major proposals: along the shore of the Oslofjord, along Eikeren to Eidsfoss and through an inland route to Tønsberg, and via Lågendalen to Larvik Station. The Eidsfoss alternative allowed the line to run through an area with good access to lumber, which the railway would aid export. The main disadvantage was that the route was 20 kilometers (12 mi) longer than via the coast. The issue was not resolved until Parliament on 8 June 1875 voted in favor of a coastal route. The narrow gauge Vestfold Line, at the time named the Jarlsberg Line, opened in 1881.

Among the strongest interests in building an interior railway through Vestfold was Schwartz, owner of Eidsfos Verk. The iron works needed supplies of coal and ore and a means of shipping the iron. The roads in the area were in poor condition and in the winter horse-drawn sleds were used. Official proposals for a private railway to connect Eidsfoss to the coast were launched in 1893. The idea caught on in Tønsberg, where the business community saw the possibility of getting an edge on the competing towns of Holmestrand and Horten through a railway to the interior. Among the stoutest proponents with Lars Christensen and took initiative to establish a committee. It hired Ole Lund to conduct surveys of a potential line. He concluded that a railway would cost 1.3 million Norwegian krone (NOK), and provide an operating profit of NOK 26,210 per year.

In a common meeting between the municipal council and the chamber of commerce in Tønsberg on 16 April 1894, there was large support for a railway to Eidsfoss. They decided to build the railway as cheaply and simply as possible. The municipal council obliged itself to purchase shares worth NOK 400,000 and the sales of the remaining shares started immediately. For municipalities through which the line would run, there was varying degree of support, with for instance Ramnes and Fon demanding that the line serve additional hamlets. This caused delays, as the committee had to negotiate with various local interests which were trying to purchase diversions and spurs through promises of purchasing additional shares. Våle Municipality was not willing to buy shares in the railway company, and thus the line was moved in favor of the residents of Ramnes Municipality.

The railway committee sent an application on 29 February 1896 to the government, which was debated by Parliament's Standing Committee on Railways on 14 July. It simultaneously considered the application for the construction of the Holmestrand–Vittingfoss Line and approved a grant of NOK 596,000 to TEB. The issue was debated in the plenary on 24 July and there the grant was approved, with forty parliamentarians voting against it. The Cabinet of State officially granted an operating permit on 4 June 1898, which initially had a duration of thirty years.

=== Construction and early years ===
Construction was subcontracted to S. Sørensen, who bid NOK 1,039,400 for the job. The lower cost would normally have resulted in lower state subsidies, but the money was instead permitted to be used to increase the rail weight from 15 to 17.5 kilograms per meter and a wider curve radius. Construction was eased by the flat landscape. Two steam locomotives, named Tønsberg and Eidsfoss, were bought from Baldwin Locomotive Works along with six passenger carriages from Skabo Jernbanevognfabrikk. Eidsfoss Verk built their own forty-eight cargo cars. Tønsberg was delivered in April 1899 and Eidsfoss in May and both participated in the construction work.

The line was officially opened by Jørgen Løvland on 18 October 1901, with regular services commencing on 21 October. At Eidsfoss the line corresponded with a steamship on Eikern. At first it was served by Ekern and from 1903 Stadthauptmand Schwartz. TEB proved popular with tourists as part of a leg of a round trip from Oslo to Tønsberg. A third locomotive, Bjørn, was bought from HVB in 1904. TEB also took delivery of fifteen additional freight cars.

For the first couple of years the line's finances were good, but by 1908 the company was in financial distress and applied to the Ministry of Labor to cover NOK 200,000 in accumulated debts which were in part caused by smaller reallocation of tracks. Parliament approved NOK 108,500 in debt reduction on 16 July 1912, half through the issue of a prioritized loan and half through the purchase of new shares. It also approved a guarantee for an operating deficit of up to NOK 7,000 per year, while demanding that any further deficits be covered by the municipalities.

During the planning of TEB there was discussion about changing the state railway's line through town and building a new station. This would have allowed NSB trains to avoid having to back from Jarlsberg Points. TEB therefore chose to build their station at Knapløkken. Thus Tønsberg was served by four stations. NSB therefore decided that it would build the Vestfold Line through Tønsberg in a loop, build a new, common station for TEB and NSB, and align the Vestfold Line out of Tønsberg next to TEB. The new line was taken into use on 1 October 1915 and the new station was completed in 1916.

=== Financial difficulties ===
Passenger traffic was fairly stable for the first years, at between 55,000 and 65,000 annual passengers. An exception occurred in 1907, when only 43,000 people were transported. Cargo transport rose gradually passing 20,000 tonnes per year in 1903 and 30,000 in 1908. The line experienced a rapid growth during the later part of the First World War, with passenger traffic peaking at 71,000 in 1918 and 35,000 tonnes of cargo.

After the end of the First World War in 1918 the company experienced a rapid rise in labor and fuel costs, without a corresponding rise in revenue. The original plans for the line had overestimated the amount of cargo that would be shipped, largely because any cargo departing for north of Bagstvold was sent via HVB to Holmestrand instead of the longer route via TEB. As NSB had lower freight rates, shippers would often send cargo via HVB even if it was going to Tønsberg or further south in Vestfold. The only significant source of revenue along the segment were the wide cars from Eidsfoss Verk, which were hindered by the loading gauge of the tunnel on HVB.

By the 1920s the railway company was struggling financially, starting off with a deficit of NOK 144,287 in 1920, which was largely paid for by Tønsberg Municipality. The municipality stated that it did not want to act as guarantor anymore, and implied that the state should cover the bill. This caused Tønsberg Sparebank to cut the railway company's access to credit. On the other hand, the municipalities of Hof and Ramnes both stated that they were willing to continue covering the deficits. At a board meeting held on 26 January 1921, all forty-five employees in TEB were laid off from 1 May. The county governor demanded that the state should take over the line.

The issue was discussed by NSB's board, and on 10 March the Ministry of Labor supported the boards motion to not nationalize the line. The issue was resolved on 28 April, when the ministry agreed to subsidize the first NOK 50,000 in deficits and a third of the remainder. The line's debt was refinanced, with NOK 73,928.60 being covered by a loan from the state and the remainder being taken over by the municipalities. In the following years the deficits were gradually reduced, hitting a low NOK 54,175 in 1924.

Patronage continued to fall, from 45,000 per year in 1921 to 35,000 in 1926. The steamship service on Eikeren was terminated in 1925, causing a significant decrease in the traffic, a year the line had a record-low passenger and cargo transport. A contributing factor was that alternative modes of transport, such as cars and bicycles became more popular. Tønsberg Municipality had by 1926 covered an accumulated NOK 407,254 in deficits. Further decreases in the freight traffic caused the municipality to establish a committee in 1924 to consider the line's future, and two years later it recommended that the line be closed from 29 June 1927. This was followed up by the ministry, who also stated that they intended to cut subsidies from the same date.

The railway company's management opposed a closing, stating that the road did not have capacity to take over the line's annual 50,000 passengers and 50,000 tonnes of cargo. They instead proposed a cost cut of NOK 20 to 30,000 per year, in part through a reduced frequency, and in part through the closing of Klopp Station and the un-staffing of Barkost, Sundbyfoss and Stubben. This was not sufficient for the Tønsberg Municipal Council, who on 7 April 1927 unanimously voted against an additional year of operation and instead encouraged planning of a road. The issue was discussed again on 20 May and this time a narrow majority supported the closing.

=== Merger and closing ===
On 23 June the management of TEB and HVB agreed to merge the administration of the two companies, under the leadership of HVB's director Heggenhougen. The agreement would allow further cost cutting, as the administration and workshop in Tønsberg could be closed. However, the two lines would continue to be owned and operate by separate companies. Minister of Labor Darre Jensen visited the area in October, and concluded that the roads did not have sufficient standard that the railway could be closed. The railway company bought a gasoline multiple unit, allowing for cheaper passenger train operations.

An all-time low patronage of 22,000 struck in 1928, before the numbers started increasing, hitting 33,000 in 1930. However, the line continued to lose money and its concessions and operating guarantees were renewed on an annual basis. Closing was discussed by NSB in 1931 and again in 1932. The company proposed a reduction in wages, and on 6 October 1933 all employees were laid off. The result was that TEB and HVB merged to form Vestfold Privatbaner, effective 1 July 1934.

=== Heritage ===
Norsk Privatebane Historisk Selskap was established in 1967 with the intention of establishing a heritage railway. It first attempted to establish itself at Kopstad Station, but instead settled for Kleppen Station. It was at the time intact with a full inventory, including such items as a complete storage of unused tickets. Several of the railway carriages were identified, most of them used as cabins. One person offered to donate two carriages, with original interior and coloring, but after a building permit was rejected he instead chose to burn them down. A representative traveled to Sweden, where he was able to purchase narrow-gauge rolling stock. Clearing of the line at Hillestad started in May 1968 and station building at Kleppen was attempted transported up to Hillestad. However, the truck carrying the building had an accident and the building was smashed. The heritage enthusiasm died out.

== See also ==
- Narrow gauge railways in Norway
