= Rail transport in Norway =

Norway
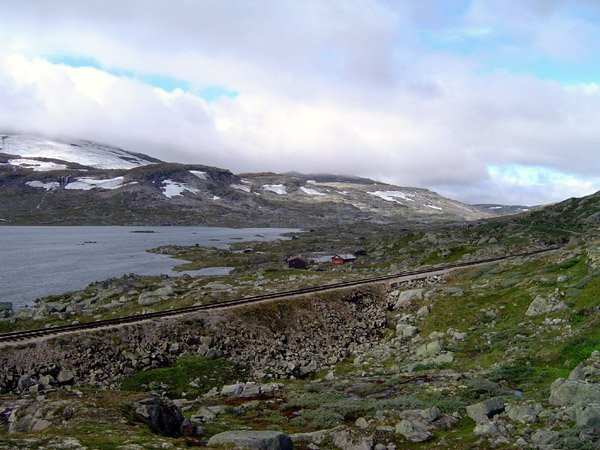
- The Bergen Line at Finse, the highest point of the Norwegian railways.

Operation
- National railway: Vy
- Infrastructure company: Bane NOR
- Major operators: SJ Norge, SJ AB, Vy and Go-Ahead Nordic

Statistics
- Ridership: 81.933 million (2024)
- Passenger-distance: 3,876 million (2024)
- Freight: 29.93 million tonnes (2024)

System length
- Total: 4,109 km (2,553 mi)
- Double track: 274 km (170 mi)
- Electrified: 2,644 km (1,643 mi)
- High-speed: 161.5 km (100 mi)

Track gauge
- Main: 1,435 mm (4 ft 8 1/2 in)

Electrification
- Main: 15 kV 16.7 Hz AC

Features
- No. of tunnels: 697
- Longest tunnel: Blix Tunnel
- No. of bridges: 2,760
- Longest bridge: Minnesund Railway Bridge
- Max elevation: 1,237 metres (4,058 ft) at Finse

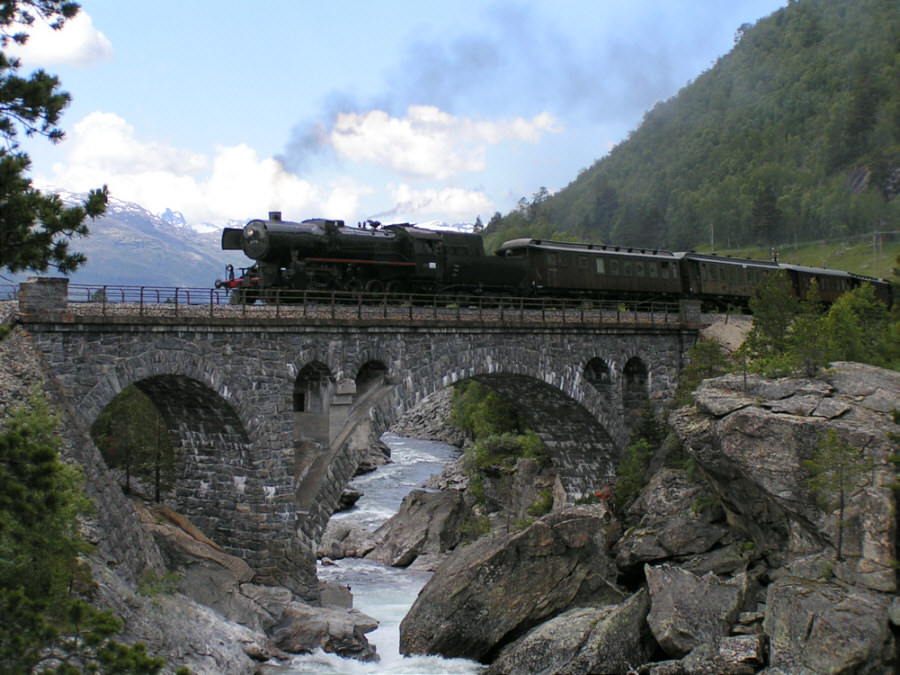
A Class 63 steam engine

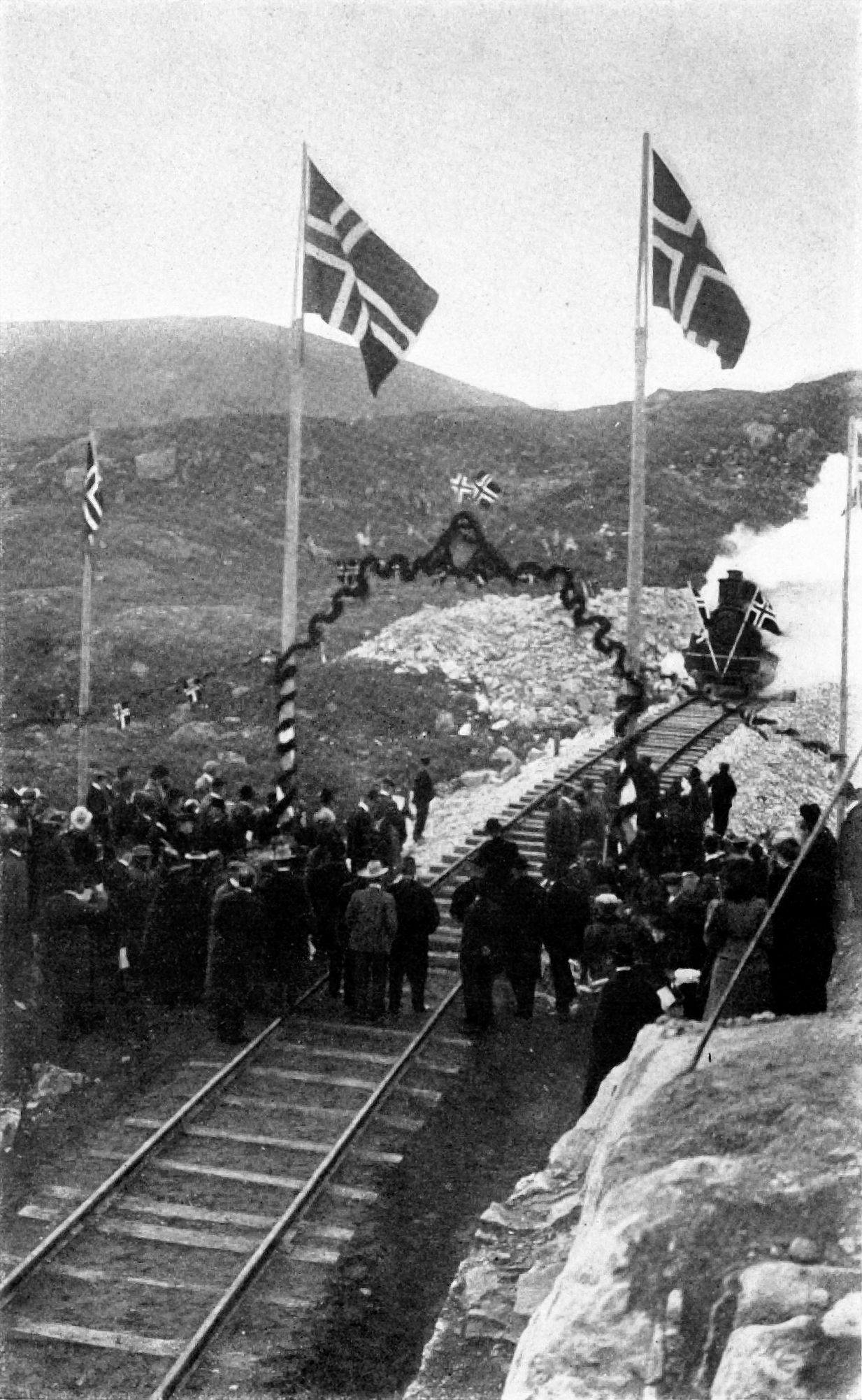
The completion of the Bergen Line

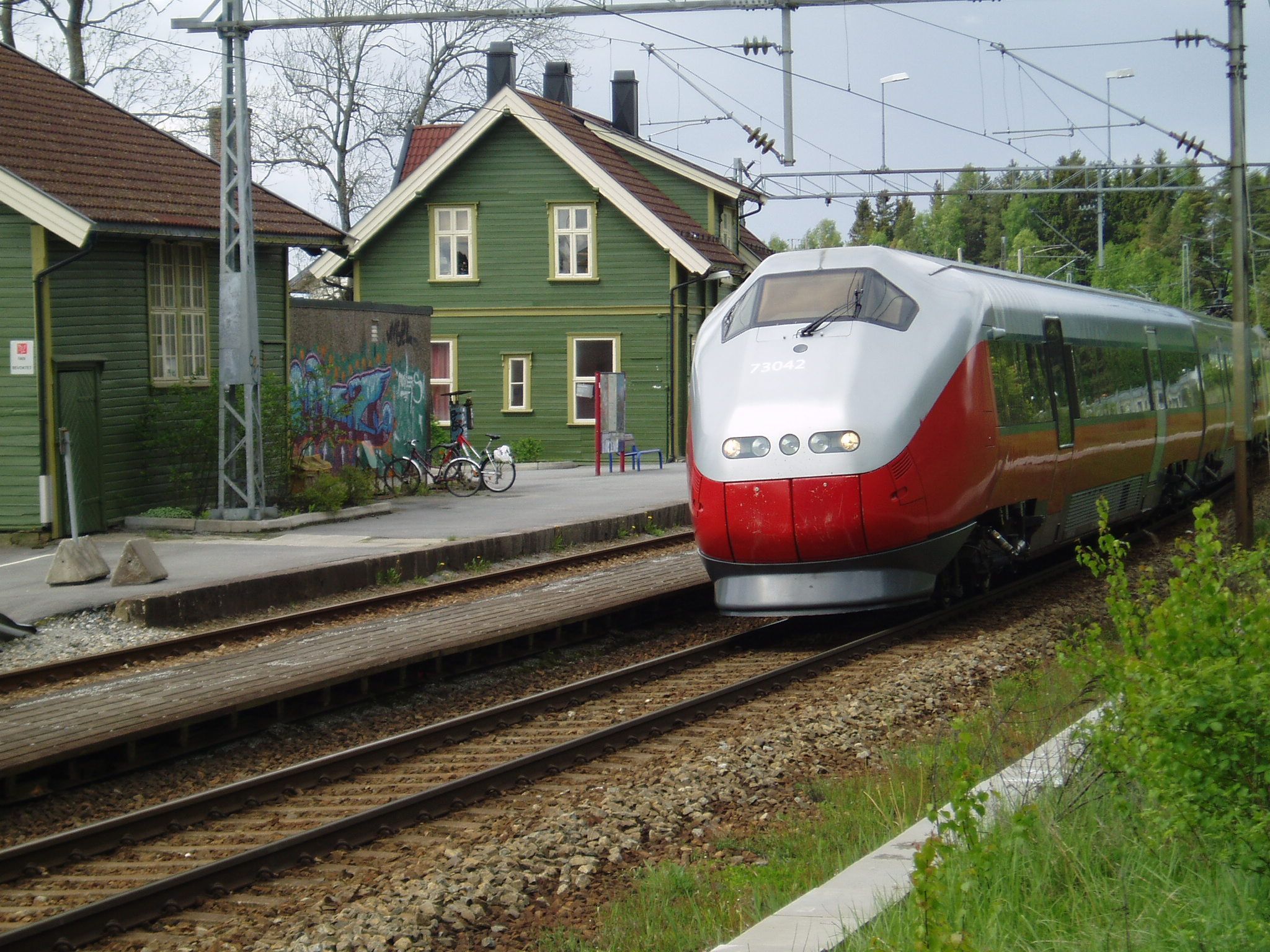
A BM 73b at Råde Station

The Norwegian railway system comprises 4,109 km of 1,435 mm (4 ft 8 1/2 in) (standard gauge) track of which 2,644 km is electrified and 274 km double track. There are 697 tunnels and 2,760 bridges.

The Norwegian Railway Directorate manages the railway network in Norway on behalf of the Ministry of Transportation. Bane NOR is a state enterprise which builds and maintains all railway tracks, while other companies operate them. These companies include Vy and subsidiaries Vy Gjøvikbanen and CargoNet, Flytoget, Go-Ahead, SJ Norge, Green Cargo, Grenland Rail and Hector Rail.

Norway is a member of the International Union of Railways (UIC). The UIC Country Code for Norway is 76.

== History ==
Map of the railway lines in Norway. — electrified lines — non-electrified lines — disused or heritage lines

The first railway in Norway was the Hoved Line between Oslo and Eidsvoll and opened in 1854. The main purpose of the railway was to move lumber from Mjøsa to the capital, but passenger service was also offered. In the period between the 1860s and the 1880s Norway saw a boom of smaller railways being built, including isolated railways in Central and Western Norway. The predominant gauge at the time was 1,067 mm (3 ft 6 in) (narrow gauge), but some lines were built in 1,435 mm (4 ft 8 1/2 in) (standard gauge). The height of the era came in 1877 when the Røros Line connected Central Norway to the capital. In 1883 the entire main railway network was taken over by Norwegian State Railways (NSB), though a number of industrial railways and branch lines continued to be operated by private companies.

Three urban railways, the Oslo Tramway, the Bergen Tramway and the Trondheim Tramway, were started as well, in 1875, 1897 and 1901 respectively. Oslo's system started with horse-drawn cars, the others were electrified from the beginning. Electric cars were introduced in Oslo in 1894 and the last horse car operated in 1900.

Bergen closed down its first generation system between 1944 and 1965, but (re-)introduced light rail transit (LRT) in 2006.

The second construction boom of the main railway arose in the 1910s and included the Bergen Line across Finse to Bergen, connecting Eastern and Western Norway. A number of other larger projects were also built in the 1920s, including a second line, the Dovre Line, to Trondheim. This period also saw the first electrified railways and a steady conversion from narrow gauge to standard gauge. Norway chose to electrify its network at 15 kV 16.7 Hz AC.

After Norway was occupied by Germany in 1940, during World War II there was massive construction by the German occupying forces as part of creating Festung Norwegen, including large sections of the Nordland Line and the completion of the Sørland Line. After the war the main effort was to complete the Nordland Line (which reached Bodø in 1962) and the decision to electrify 50% of the network, a task not completed until 1970. This allowed the retirement of steam locomotives, which were replaced with electric engines such as the El 11 and El 13 or the diesel powered Di 3. In 1966 Norway's only rapid transit, Oslo T-bane was opened, but in the same decade the Bergen tramway was closed. In the 1970s-80s many branch lines were also abandoned.

In 1980 the massive project of connecting the eastern and western railway networks around Oslo was completed with the opening of the Oslo Tunnel and Oslo Central Station. In 1996 NSB was split into the Norwegian Railway Inspectorate, Jernbaneverket and an operating company NSB BA. Since then, the companies have been split into 10 separate corporations. In 1998 the first new line in 36 years was opened when the high-speed Gardermoen Line was opened to allow travel at 210 km/h between Oslo, Oslo Airport and Eidsvoll. The 1990s also saw the massive introduction of multiple units on passenger trains. In the 2000s the freight segment was deregulated and a number of freight companies have started competing with the NSB subsidiary CargoNet.

The national main routes in Norway are considered to be among the slowest in Europe, and slower than parts of East Africa, with average speeds below 80 km/h.

A combination of natural disasters, aging lines and equipment, and lack of electrification north of Stjørdal made the situation rapidly worse in the 2020s; Dovre Line was closed for nine months in 2023-24 after the Randklev Bridge fell into the Lågen river, and for several months in 2025 due to the bridge south of Otta Station being weakened by ice accumulation around its pillars. After the 2024 Finneidfjord train derailment on the Nordland Line with one fatality, services on the line were sharply reduced since the derailment caused the write-off of one of very few remaining locomotives suited for national lines, with enough new locomotives to resume night services not planned to be put into service until 2029, and a mudslide on the combined Nordland Line / Trønderbanen stretch from Levanger-Steinkjer in August 2025 that led to 1 person missing has made that stretch inoperable until well into 2026 and with several locomotives unable to be moved south of the slide point, which in turn affected services on other lines as well. The Stjørdalselva river flooding in March 2025 shut down the Meråker Line for some weeks, and various slides around Drangsdalen have shut down the Sørland Line in short periods.

== Network ==
=== Track ===
The main railway network consists of 4,087 km of lines, of which 262 km is double track and 60 km high-speed rail (210 km/h). In addition there is 225 km of urban railways, of which 218 km is double track. In addition there are some industrial tracks and minor branch lines and some abandoned and heritage railways. The entire main network is 1,435 mm (4 ft 8 1/2 in) (standard gauge), as are the urban railways in Oslo and Bergen. Of the operational railways in Norway, only the Trondheim Tramway has a different gauge, the meter gauge, 1,000 mm (3 ft 3 3/8 in). Some heritage railways, though, operate with various kinds of narrow gauge.

The Kirkenes–Bjørnevatn Line used to be the northernmost railway in the world, but was in 2010 beaten by the Obskaya–Bovanenkovo Line in Russia. Still, Narvik is one of the northernmost towns in the world to have a railway connection, as the terminus for the Ofoten Line. It connects to Kiruna, Sweden, but not to Bodø, the northern terminus of the Norwegian railway network. Kiruna is, however, connected to the Swedish railway network, which again is connected to the Norwegian network at the Swedish stations of Charlottenberg, Storlien and Kornsjø.

=== Traction ===
2,622 km (64%) of the railway network is electrified, all of it at 15 kV 16.7 Hz AC with overhead wires. The only sections that are not electrified are the lines north of Mjøsa, with the sole exception of the Dovre Line and the Ofoten Line. On non-electrified sections diesel locomotives are used. All of the urban railways use 600 or 750 V DC, via overhead wires on the tramways and via third-rail on the Oslo T-bane.

=== Future expansion plans ===
In its plans, Bane NOR will concentrate its expansions primarily on the cramped network around Oslo and the larger cities.

- New tunnel under Oslo city center.
- Vestfold Line: A new alignment between Larvik and Porsgrunn around 23 km (14 mi) long, reducing travel time by 22 minutes. Double track between Drammen and Tønsberg is under construction and due by 2025. The plan is to make the whole line double tracked from Drammen to Porsgrunn.
- Sørland Line: Plans may include between Porsgrunn and Skorstøl, which would realign trains to southern Norway via Vestfold.
- Østfold Line: The Østfold Line is today double track both north and south of Moss, but in Moss 10 km (6 mi) remains as a single track bottleneck. Plans is to realign the railway through Moss, with double track through two tunnels.
- Ringerike Line is a planned railway between Sandvika and Hønefoss that will reduce travel time between Oslo and Hønefoss/Bergen by 50 minutes. Construction is postponed indefinitely.
- Bergen Line: Double track from Bergen to Arna. Later plans call for double track further east to Stanghelle and Voss.
- Dovre Line: Expanding the rest of the line between Eidsvoll and Hamar to double track by 2027. Realignment of Dovrebanen south of Trondheim may be done together with relocating of Trondheims freight terminal.
- Nordland Line/Meråker Line: Later plans may include double tracking between Trondheim and Stjørdal, and a new tunnel between Stjørdal and Levanger.
- The Bergen Light Rail was opened in 2010, and extensions are being built.
- The Oslo T-bane will be expanded, as will the Trondheim tramway.

High speed rail

The question about building a high-speed railway between the largest Southern Norwegian cities has been discussed at political level, and a report was ready by the end of 2007. Advocates for rail transport and environmentalists have wanted to build high speed railways, including upgrades to 250 km/h on the Sørland Line, Bergen Line, and Dovre Line while others, including Norsk Bane, have suggested construction of a new line through Haukeli to Stavanger, Haugesund and Bergen.

Platform heights

There are current proposed figures:

- 300 mm (11.8 in) above rail for long-distance trains
- 760 mm (29.9 in) above rail for commuter trains
- 550 mm (21.7 in) above rail for shared platforms
- For 1,520 mm (4 ft 11 27/32 in) or 1,524 mm (5 ft) broad gauge lines, passenger platforms shall be as low to 127 mm (5.0 in) above rail should be allowed.

=== Heritage ===
There are also several operational museum railways in Norway, including the Krøder Line, Setesdal Line, Urskog–Høland Line, Thamshavn Line, Rjukan Line, Valdres Line, Nesttun–Os Railway and Old Voss Line. The Norwegian Railway Museum is located in Hamar and includes exhibits of train hardware, related objects, as well as document and photography archives.

=== Lines ===
==== Fully operational lines ====
| Line name | Termini | | Length | | Power | Opened | Other info |
| Line name | Termini | | km | miles | Power | Opened | Other info |
|---|---|---|---|---|---|---|---|
| Bergen Line | Hønefoss Station | Bergen Station | 371 | 231 | Electric | 1909-12-01 | Operated route Oslo S–Drammen–Bergen (495 km) |
| Flåm Line | Myrdal Station | Flåm Station | 20 | 12 | Electric | 1941-10-15 | Branch to the Bergen Line |
| Randsfjord Line | Hokksund Station | Hønefoss Station | 54 | 34 | Electric | 1868-10-13 | Operated as part of the Bergen Line |
| Bratsberg Line | Eidanger Station | Nordagutu Station | 47 | 29 | Electric | 1917-12-17 | Operated route Porsgrunn–Notodden (incl. the Tinnos Line); Eidanger–Skien operated as part of the Vestfold Line |
| Tinnos Line | Hjuksebø Station | Notodden Station | 10 | 6.2 | Electric | 1909-08-09 | Operated route Porsgrunn–Notodden as part of the Bratsberg Line |
| Dovre Line | Eidsvoll Station | Trondheim Station | 492 | 306 | Electric | 1921-09-20 | Operated route Oslo S–Dombås–Trondheim (553 km) |
| Rauma Line | Dombås Station | Åndalsnes Station | 115 | 71 | Diesel | 1924-11-30 | Operated as branch to the Dovre Line |
| Drammen Line | Oslo S | Drammen Station | 42 | 26 | Electric | 1872-10-07 | |
| Asker Line | Sandvika Station | Asker Station | 15 | 9.3 | Electric | 2005-08-01 | Parallel line to the Drammen Line |
| Spikkestad Line | Asker Station | Spikkestad Station | 12 | 7.5 | Electric | (1872-10-07); 1973-06-03 | Branch to and originally part of the Drammen Line; Operated route Spikkestad–Oslo S–Lillestrøm |
| Gardermoen Line | Etterstad Station | Eidsvoll Station | 64 | 40 | Electric | 1999-08-22 | Operated route Oslo S–Lillestrøm–Gardermoen/–Eidsvoll |
| Gjøvik Line | Oslo S | Gjøvik Station | 123 | 76 | Electric | 1902-11-28 | |
| Hoved Line | Oslo S | Eidsvoll Station | 84 | 52 | Electric | 1854-09-01 | |
| Kongsvinger Line | Lillestrøm Station | Charlottenberg Station | 116 | 72 | Electric | 1865-11-04 | Operated route Oslo S–Lillestrøm–Kongsvinger/–Sweden; Continues as Värmlandsbanan |
| Meråker Line | Hell Station | Storlien Station | 70 | 43 | Electric | 1881-10-17 | Operated route Trondheim–Hell–Meråker–Sweden; Continues as Mittbanan |
| Nordland Line | Trondheim Station | Bodø Station | 734 | 456 | Diesel | 1962-02-01 | |
| Ofoten Line | Narvik Station | Bjørnfjell Station | 43 | 27 | Electric | 1902-11-15 | Continues as Malmbanan |
| Røros Line | Hamar Station | Støren Station | 382 | 237 | Diesel | 1877-10-17 | Operated route Oslo S–Hamar–Røros–Trondheim |
| Sørland Line | Drammen Station | Stavanger Station | 549 | 341 | Electric | 1944-03-01 | Operated route Oslo S–Kristiansand–Stavanger (588 km) |
| Arendal Line | Arendal Station | Nelaug Station | 36 | 22 | Electric | (1910-12-18); 1938-06-22 | Branch to the Sørland Line; Originally part of the Treungen Line |
| Vestfold Line | Drammen Station | Eidanger Station | 138 | 86 | Electric | 1882-11-24 | Operated route (Lillehammer–)Oslo S–Skien |
| Østfold Line | Oslo S | Kornsjø Station | 171 | 106 | Electric | 1879-07-25 | Operated route Oslo S–Halden/–Sweden; Continues as Norway/Vänern Line |
| Follo Line | Oslo S | Ski Station | 22 | 14 | Electric | 2022-12-11 | Parallel line to the Østfold Line |
| Eastern Østfold Line | Ski Station | Rakkestad Station | 54 | 34 | Electric | 1882-11-24 | Operated route Oslo S–Rakkestad |

==== Freight only lines ====
| Line name | Termini | | Length | | Power | Opened | Other info |
| Line name | Termini | | km | miles | Power | Opened | Other info |
|---|---|---|---|---|---|---|---|
| Alnabru–Grefsen Line | Grefsen Station | Alnabru Station | 4 | 2.5 | Electric | 1901-01-20 | Connecting the Hoved Line and Gjøvik Line |
| Brevik Line | Eidanger Station | Brevik Station | 9 | 5.6 | Electric | 1882-11-24 | Branch to the Vestfold Line |
| Dalane–Suldal Line | Dalane Station | Suldal Station | 1 | 0.62 | Electric | 1943-05-15 | Bypass to the Sørland Line |
| Loenga–Alnabru Line | Loenga Station | Alnabru Station | 3 | 1.9 | Electric | 1907-05-01 | Connecting the Hoved Line and Østfold Line |
| Roa–Hønefoss Line | Roa Station | Hønefoss Station | 34 | 21 | Electric | 1909-12-01 | Operated as branch to the Bergen Line |
| Skøyen–Filipstad Line | Skøyen Station | Filipstad Station | 2 | 1.2 | Electric | (1872-10-07); 1980-06-01 | Branch to and originally part of the Drammen Line |
| Solør Line | Kongsvinger Station | Elverum Station | 88 | 55 | Diesel | 1910-12-04 | Connecting the Kongsvinger Line and Røros Line |
| Stavne–Leangen Line | Stavne Station | Leangen Station | 6 | 3.7 | Electric | 1957-06-02 | Connecting the Dovre Line and Nordland Line |
| Eastern Østfold Line | Rakkestad Station | Sarpsborg Station | 26 | 16 | Electric | 1882-11-24 | Alternate for the Østfold Line |

==== Lines with no regular traffic ====
| Line name | Termini | | Length | | Power | Opened | Discontinued | Other info |
| Line name | Termini | | km | miles | Power | Opened | Discontinued | Other info |
|---|---|---|---|---|---|---|---|---|
| Nesttun Line | Bergen Station | Minde Station | 4 | 2.5 | Electric | 1883-07-11 | 1965-02-01 | Branch to the Bergen Line |
| Hardanger Line | Voss Station | Palmafoss Station | 3 | 1.9 | Electric | 1935-04-01 | 1985-06-01 | Branch to the Bergen Line |
| Kragerø Line | Neslandsvatn Station | Merkebekk Station | 6 | 3.7 | Diesel | 1927-12-02 | 1989-01-01 | Branch to the Sørland Line |
| Namsos Line | Grong Station | Namsos Station | 52 | 32 | Diesel | 1933-11-01 | 1978-01-01 | Branch to the Nordland Line |
| Numedal Line | Kongsberg Station | Rollag Station | 48 | 30 | Diesel | 1927-11-20 | 1989-01-01 | Branch to the Sørland Line |
| Treungen Line | Nelaug Station | Simonstad Station | 8 | 5.0 | Diesel | 1910-12-18 | 1967-01-01 | Branch to the Sørland Line |

==== Heritage railway ====
| Line name | Termini | | Length | | Power | Opened | Discontinued | Other info |
| Line name | Termini | | km | miles | Power | Opened | Discontinued | Other info |
|---|---|---|---|---|---|---|---|---|
| Old Voss Line | Tunestveit Station | Midttun Station | 22 | 14 | Steam | 1883-07-11 | 1964-08-01 | Connection to the Bergen Line |
| Krøder Line | Vikersund Station | Krøderen Station | 26 | 16 | Steam | 1872-11-28 | 1958-01-19 | Connection to the Bergen Line |
| Tinnos Line | Notodden Station | Tinnoset Station | 30 | 19 | Electric | 1909-08-09 | 1991-07-05 | Connected by ferry Connection to the Bratsberg Line |
| Rjukan Line | Mæl Station | Rjukan Station | 16 | 9.9 | Electric | 1909-08-09 | 1991-07-05 | Connected by ferry Connection to the Bratsberg Line |
| Setesdal Line | Grovane Station | Røyknes Station | 8 | 5.0 | Steam | 1896-11-27 | 1962-09-02 | Connection to the Sørland Line |
| Urskog–Høland Line | Sørumsand Station | Fossum Station | 4 | 2.5 | Steam | 1903-12-07 | 1960-07-01 | |
| Thamshavn Line | Bårdshaug Station | Svorkmo Station | 22 | 14 | Electric | 1908-07-15 | 1974-05-30 | |
| Valdres Line | Eina Station | Dokka Station | 47 | 29 | Diesel | 1902-11-28 | 1989-01-01 | Connection to the Gjøvik Line |

==== No traffic allowed ====
| Line name | Termini | | Length | | Power | Opened | Discontinued | Other info |
| Line name | Termini | | km | miles | Power | Opened | Discontinued | Other info |
|---|---|---|---|---|---|---|---|---|
| Flekkefjord Line | Sira Station | Flekkefjord Station | 17 | 11 | Diesel | 1904-11-01 | 1991-01-01 | Branch to the Sørland Line |
| Kragerø Line | Merkebekk Station | Sannidal Station | 12 | 7.5 | Diesel | 1927-12-02 | 1989-01-01 | Branch to the Sørland Line |
| Numedal Line | Rollag Station | Rødberg Station | 45 | 28 | Diesel | 1927-11-20 | 1989-01-01 | Branch to the Sørland Line |
| Valdres Line | Dokka Station | Bjørgo Station | 43 | 27 | Diesel | 1903-11-01 | 1989-01-01 | Branch to the Gjøvik Line |

=== Urban railways ===
| Line name | System | Opened |
|---|---|---|
| Bybanen | Bergen Light Rail | 2010 |
| Fløibanen | Bergen | 1914 |
| Furuset Line | Oslo T-bane | 1970 |
| Gråkallen Line | Trondheim Tramway | 1893 to Ila; 1933 to Lian |
| Grorud Line | Oslo T-bane | 1966 |
| Holmenkoll Line | Oslo T-bane | 1898 |
| Kjelsås Line | Oslo Tramway | 1934 |
| Kolsås Line | Oslo T-bane | 1924 |
| Lambertseter Line | Oslo T-bane | 1957 |
| Lilleaker Line | Oslo Tramway | 1919 |
| Østensjø Line | Oslo T-bane | 1926 |
| Røa Line | Oslo T-bane | 1912 |
| Sognsvann Line | Oslo T-bane | 1933 |

== Railway links with adjacent countries ==
Sweden is the only country with which Norway shares railway borders. Sweden and Norway share gauge, loading gauge, signaling system, electric system, GSM-R and automatic trains stop systems. Most rolling stock can cross the border. There are four border crossings: the Østfold Line–Norway/Vänern Line, the Kongsvinger Line–Värmland Line, the Meråker Line–Central Line and the Ofoten Line–Iron Ore Line. All crossings have electric traction on the Swedish side, but the Meråker Line lacks it on the Norwegian side. There have previously been operational train ferries to Denmark.

There are proposals to connect Northern Norway to Finland (the planned Arctic Railway) and Russia. At Kirkenes, the Kirkenes–Bjørnevatn Line is proposed to be connected to Russia's Murmansk–Nikel Railway, and the line is also proposed for connection to the Finnish network in Rovaniemi (there has been a line between Rovaniemi and the Murmansk railway). Russia has generally dismissed this proposal in favour of using Russian ports instead of Kirkenes. Another proposal has been to build a line from Kolari to Skibotn and Tromsø, even if connecting to the existing line to Narvik is the main suggestion.

== Operation ==
=== Railway companies ===
Traditionally, all trains were operated by Vy (formerly NSB), but the deregulation in the 2000s has led to the introduction of a number of new freight operators, including CargoNet, Hector Rail, Tågåkeriet and Ofoten Line. The conservative-liberal government tried to introduce public service obligation bids on subsidized passenger routes in 2005, but the contract was won by the NSB subsidiary NSB Anbud and the following red-green government has cancelled further PSO contracting. Also the Airport Express Train has been made a separate company.

In 2017 Norway's Ministry of Transport and Communications decided to develop tenders for the operation of passenger rail services. On 4 February 2018, it launched a tender to deliver Traffic Package 1 that will commence on 15 December 2019, comprising long-distance services on the Sørlandet Line from Oslo to Stavanger. In October 2018 this package was awarded to Go-Ahead Nordic.

In March 2018, the Norwegian Railway Directorate launched tenders for Traffic Package 2, passenger services on the Røros Line, Meråker Line, Rauma Line, and Nordland Line, plus regional services in Trøndelag county. SJ will commence operating the package on 7 June 2020.

On 21 December 2018, the Norwegian Railway Directorate launched tenders for Traffic Package 3, passenger services on the Oslo to Bergen line starting on 13 December 2020.

=== Passenger services ===
| Route | Line(s) | Stations | Traction | Operator | tph |
|---|---|---|---|---|---|
| F1 | Kongsvinger, Gardermoen | Oslo S – Charlottenberg [– Stockholm C] | Electric | SJ | 5 tpd |
| L1 | Spikkestad, Drammen, Trunk | (Spikkestad –) Asker – Oslo S – Lillestrøm | Electric | Vy | 4 |
| FLY1 | Drammen, Asker, Gardermoen | Drammen – Asker – Oslo S – Oslo Airport | Electric | Flytoget | 4 |
| FLY2 | Drammen, Asker, Gardermoen | Stabekk – Oslo S – Oslo Airport | Electric | Flytoget | 2 |
| RE10 | Drammen, Asker, Gardermoen, Dovre | Drammen – Oslo S – Oslo Airport – Eidsvoll – Hamar – Lillehammer (– Dombås) | Electric | Vy | 1 |
| RE11 | Vestfold, Drammen, Asker, Gardermoen | Skien – Drammen – Oslo S – Oslo Airport – Eidsvoll | Electric | Vy | 1 |
| R12 | Sørlandet, Drammen, Asker, Gardermoen | Kongsberg – Hokksund – Drammen – Oslo S – Oslo Airport – Eidsvoll | Electric | Vy | 1 |
| R13 | Drammen, Asker, Gardermoen, Trunk | Drammen – Oslo S – Dal | Electric | Vy | 2 |
| R14 | Drammen, Asker, Gardermoen, Kongsvinger | Asker – Oslo S – Kongsvinger | Electric | Vy | 1 |
| L2 | Østfold, Drammen | Stabekk – Oslo S – Ski | Electric | Vy | 4 |
| RE20 | Østfold, Follo | Oslo S – Ski – Moss – Halden Station [(– Gothenburg C)] | Electric | Vy | 1 |
| R21 | Østfold, Follo | Oslo S – Ski – Moss | Electric | Vy | 2 |
| R22 | Eastern Østfold, Follo | Oslo S – Ski – Mysen (– Rakkestad) | Electric | Vy | 1 |
| RE30 | Gjøvik | Oslo S – Jaren – Gjøvik | Electric | Vy | 1 |
| R31 | Gjøvik | Oslo S – Hakadal (– Jaren) | Electric | Vy | 1 |
| F4 | Bergen, Randsfjorden, Sørlandet, Drammen, Asker | Bergen – Oslo S | Electric | Vy | 5 tpd |
| L4 | Bergen | Bergen – Arna | Electric | Vy | 2 |
| R40 | Bergen | Bergen – Arna – Voss (– Myrdal) | Electric | Vy | 1 |
| R45 | Flåm | Myrdal – Flåm | Electric | Vy | 1/2 |
| F5 | Sørlandet, Drammen, Asker | Stavanger – Kristiansand – Nelaug – Drammen – Oslo S | Electric | Go-Ahead | 1/2 |
| L5 | Sørlandet | Stavanger Station – Skeiane (– Nærbø – Egersund) | Electric | Go-Ahead | 4 |
| R50 | Arendal | Nelaug – Arendal | Electric | Go-Ahead | 1/2 |
| R55 | Bratsberg | Notodden – Nordagutu – Skien – Porsgrunn | Electric | Vy | 1/2 |
| F6 | Dovre, Gardermoen | Oslo S – Hamar – Dombås – Støren – Trondheim S | Electric | SJ | 6 tpd |
| R60 | Røros, Dovre | Hamar – Rørs (– Støren – Trondheim S) | Diesel | SJ | 1/2 |
| R65 | Rauma | Dombås – Åndalsnes | Diesel | SJ | 4 tpd |
| F7 | Nordland | Trondheim S – Steinkjer – Rognan – Bodø | Diesel | SJ | 3 tpd |
| R70 | Nordland | Støren – Trondheim S – Hell – Steinkjer | Mixed | SJ | 1 |
| R71 | Meråker, Nordland | Trondheim S – Hell – Meråker – Storlien | Diesel | SJ | 2 tpd |
| R75 | Nordland | Rognan – Fauske – Bodø | Diesel | SJ | 1/2 |
| F8 | Ofoten | [Luleå –] Riksgränsen — Narvik | Electric | SJ | 1 tpd |

Map of passenger services

=== Passenger rolling stock ===
Until the 1990s only commuter and regional trains were operated with multiple units, but since then Vy has ordered numerous multiple units for its regional and express lines. Express trains are operated with 16 BM 73 units with tilting technology, regional trains with 16 BM 70, 6 BM 73b (both electric) and 15 BM 93 (diesel) units while the local trains are operated by 71 BM 69 and 36 BM 72 (both electric) while the local trains around Trondheim, Trøndelag Commuter Rail, uses 14 BM 92 diesel multiple unit. The Airport Express Train uses 16 BM 71 and Vy Gjøvikbanen operates 9 BM 69g units. The Ofoten Line operates three BM 68 electric multiple units.

Vy still uses locomotive hauled passenger trains on a few of the long-distance lines. For this task they use 22 El 18s and 5 Di 4s in addition to six El 17 on the Flåm Line. Most of the cars are B7 on long-distance services and B5 on regional services. Most of the locomotives have been transferred to the freight division CargoNet.

=== Freight rolling stock ===
CargoNet uses a combination of 30 El 14, 15 El 16, 19 Di 8 and 6 CD66. The other companies use stock retired by NSB, including the Ofoten Line's 7 El 13, 5 Di 3 and 2 T43, HectorRail's 6 El 15 (now known as 161) and Tåkåkeriet's Rc2.

== Abandoned railways ==
See Chronology of Norwegian railway lines.

- Losbylinja (Østmorksaga–Fjellhamar) (1861–ca 1940)
- Kalvskinnet-Heimdallinjen (Kalvskinnet–Heimdal) (1864–1884)
- Krøder Line (Vikersund–Krøderen) (1872–1985)
- Sulitjelma Line (Finneid–Sulitjelma) (1892–1972)
- Nesttun–Os Railway (Nesttun–Os) (1894–1935)
- Setesdal Line (Kristiansand–Byglandsfjord) (1896–1962)
- Urskog–Høland Line (Sørumsand–Skulerud) (1896–1960)
- Lillesand–Flaksvand Line (Lillesand–Flaksvann) (1896–1953)
- Hafslund Line (Hafslund–Sundløkka) (1898–1973)
- Tønsberg–Eidsfoss Line (Tønsberg–Eidsfoss) (1901–1938)
- Holmestrand–Vittingfoss Line (Holmestrand–Vittingfoss) (1902–1938)
- Skreia Line (Reinsvoll–Skreia (1902–1987)
- Lier Line (Lier–Svangstrand) (1904)
- Flekkefjord Line (Sira–Flekkefjord) (1904–1990)
- Valdres Line (Eina–Fagernes) (1906–1988)
- Grimstad Line (Grimstad–Rise) (1907–1961)
- Oslo Port Line (Loenga–Filipstad) (1907–1983)
- Thamshavn Line (Løkken–Thamshavn) (1908–1974)
- Rjukan Line (Rjukan–Mæl) (1908–1991)
- Tinnos Line (Tinnoset–Notodden) (1908–1990)
- Kirkenes–Bjørnevatn Line (Kirkenes–Bjørnevatn) (1910–1997)
- Treungen Line (Nelaug–Treungen) (1913–1967)
- Vestmarka Line (Skotterud–Vestmarka) (1918–)
- Solbergfoss Line (Askim–Solbergfoss) (1918–)
- Ålgård Line (Ganddal–Ålgård) (1924–1988)
- Sperill Line (Hen–Sperillen) (1926–1957)
- Numedal Line (Kongsberg–Rødberg) (1927–1988)
- Kragerø Line (Neslandsvatn–Kragerø) (1927–1988)
- Namsos Line (Grong–Namsos) (1933)
- Hardanger Line (Vossevangen–Granvin) (1935)
- Røykenvik Line (Jaren–Røykenvik)
- Ilsvika Line (Skansen–Fagervika)
- Hauerseter–Gardermoen Line (Hauerseter–Gardermoen)

=== Abandoned urban railways ===
- Lade Line (Trondheim Tramway) (1901–1988)
- Elgeseter Line (Trondheim Tramway) (1913–1983)
- Singsaker Line (Trondheim Tramway) (1927–1968)

== See also ==
- Rail transport by country
- Rail transport in Sweden
- Transport in Norway
- Narrow-gauge railways in Norway
- Norwegian railway signalling
- Norges Statsbaner rolling stock
