= Nisterud Station =

Railway station in Skien, Norway

Nisterud
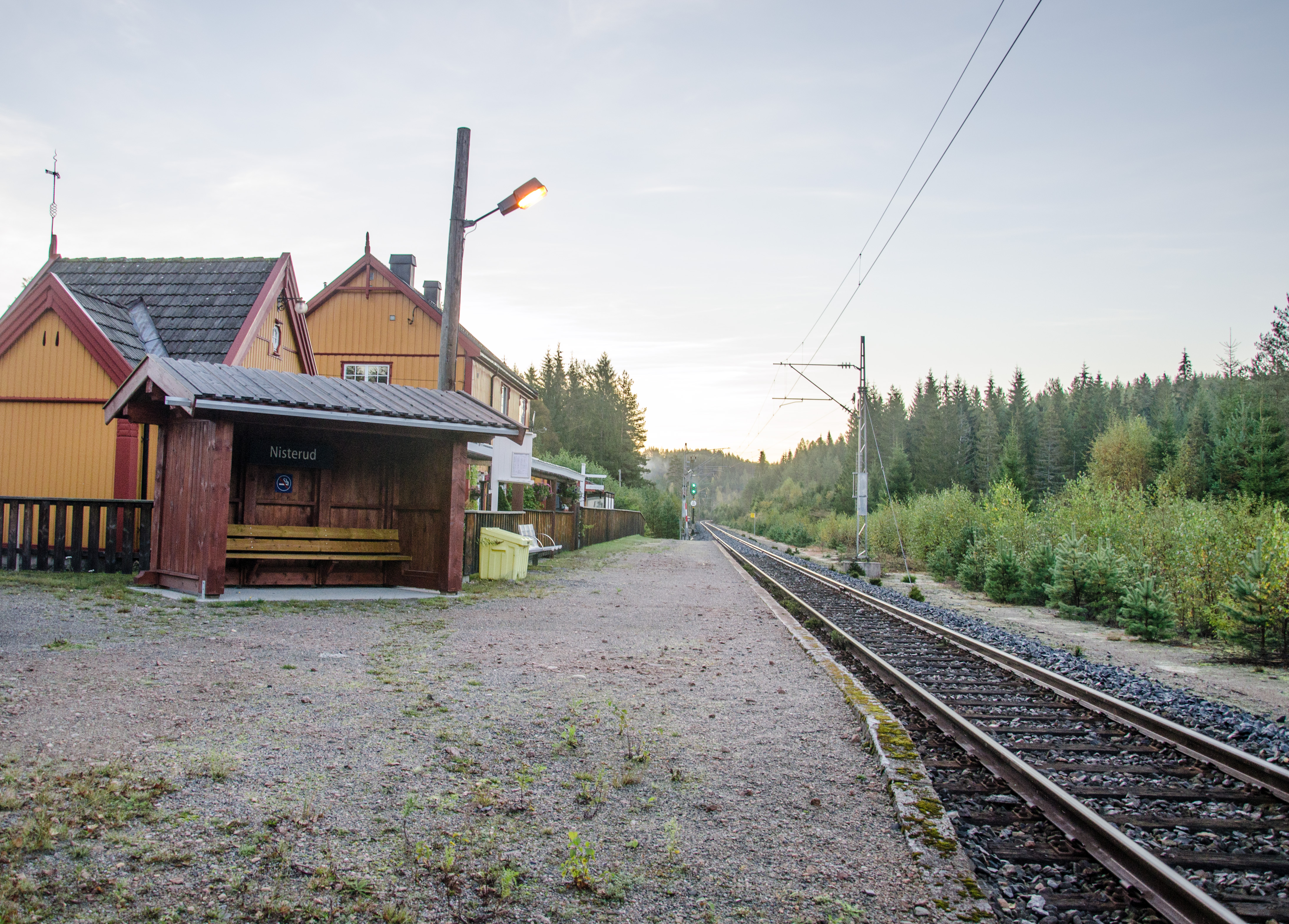

General information
- Location: Nisterud, Skien Municipality; Norway
- Coordinates: 59°18′1.15″N 9°29′6.54″E
- Owner: Bane NOR
- Operator: Vy
- Line: Bratsberg Line
- Platforms: 1
- Connections: Bus: Farte

History
- Opened: 1919
Location

Nisterud Station is a railway station on the Bratsberg Line serving the Nisterud area north of the city of Skien in rural Skien Municipality in Telemark county, Norway. The station has only one track and one platform, and is served with an hourly service to Grenland by Vy.

== History ==
The station was opened in 1919, two years after Bratsberg Line. It was staffed until 1973. After the reorganization of the Bratsberg Line in 2004, Nisterud is the only station between Skien and Nordagutu that is served.

Preceding station	Regional trains	Following station
Skien towards Porsgrunn	R55	Nordagutu towards Notodden
