= NSB Class 66 =

Norwegian State Railways' class of three-car electric train

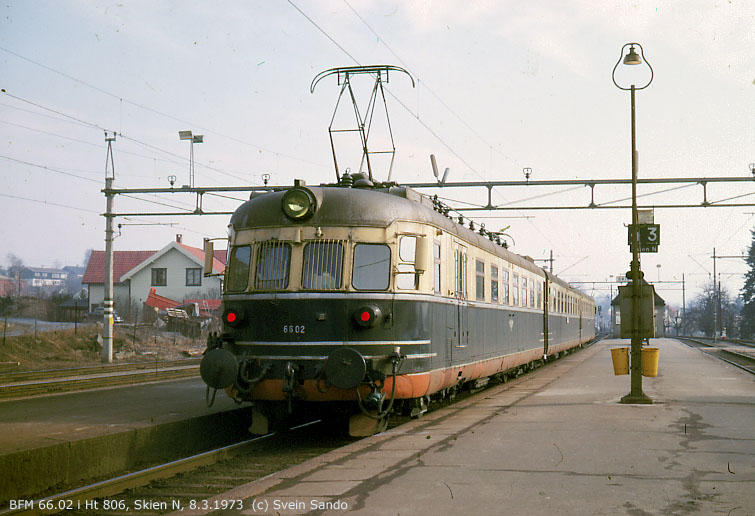
- NSB 66.02 at Skien Station in 1973
- In service: 1945–1977
- Manufacturer: Skabo
- Constructed: 1945–1946
- Number built: 4 units
- Formation: BFM + B + BS
- Capacity: 170 (46+70+54)
- Operators: Norwegian State Railways
- Lines served: Østfold Line; Sørlandet Line; Vestfold Line

Specifications
- Car length: Motor car: 22,175 mm (72 ft 9 in); Center car: 21,750 mm (71 ft 4 in); Control car: 21,750 mm (71 ft 4 in)
- Maximum speed: 120 km/h (75 mph)
- Weight: Motor car: 46.7 t (46.0 long tons; 51.5 short tons); Center car: 28.0 t (27.6 long tons; 30.9 short tons); Control car: 28.5 t (28.0 long tons; 31.4 short tons)
- Power output: 474 kW (636 hp)
- Electric system(s): 15 kV 16.7 Hz AC Catenary
- Current collector(s): Pantograph
- Track gauge: 1,435 mm (4 ft 8 1/2 in)

NSB Class 66 (Norwegian: NSB type 66) was a three-car electric train used by the Norwegian State Railways for express trains on the Østfold Line to Halden and Gothenburg, and the Sørlandet Line to Kristiansand and Stavanger. The four multiple units were built by Skabo Jernbanevognfabrikk, with motors from Norsk Elektrisk & Brown Boveri, and delivered in 1945–46. They were originally named Class 106, but this was changed in 1956. The trains received the numbering BFM 66.01–04, B 66.31–34 and BS 66.61–64.

The class was the electric counterpart of diesel Class 88. With a power output of 474 kW (636 hp), it was the first train capable of 120 kilometers per hour (75 mph) in Norway. One of the Class 66 trains was involved in the Hjuksebø train disaster in 1950. Since 1967, the trains served on the Vestfold Line. The Class 66 was retired from service in 1977. BFM 66.01 has been preserved by the Norwegian Railway Museum.

== Construction ==
Four Class 66 units were ordered by the Norwegian State Railways (NSB) in 1939, to be used as express trains on the then newly or shortly-to-be electrified Sørland- and Østfold Lines. At the same time, similar Class 88 diesel multiple units were ordered for the non-electrified Bergen- and Dovre Lines. The trains were built by Strømmens Værksted, Skabo Jernbanevognfabrikk and Norsk Elektrisk & Brown Boveri (NEBB). The diesel series was assembled by Strømmen, while Skabo assembled the electric version. NEBB delivered the motors for the units.

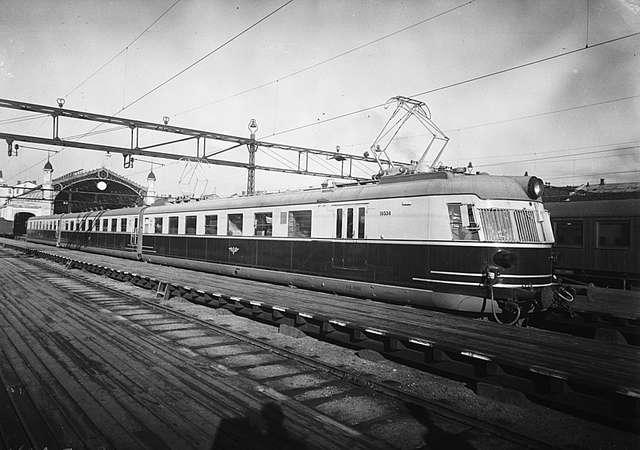
Class 66 unit at Oslo East Station in 1945

During construction, which occurred during World War II, there were several modifications, delays and accidents during construction to avoid the trains being finished before the war ended; this was to avoid the finished trains to be able to assist the German occupation forces. The first three units were finished in 1945, and delivery was completed the following year. The class was originally numbered 106, but NSB changed the numbering system in 1956, and the class was renumbered to 66. The units consisted of three cars, given the lettering BFM, B and BS. They were numbered 66.01–04, 66.31–34 and 66.61–64, respectively; this numbering system dates from 1970.

== Specifications ==
The trains had aluminum bodies, that were painted in the unusual colors of blue and yellow. Total weight for three cars was 102.2 tonnes (100.6 long tons; 112.7 short tons), of which the cars respectively weighed 46.7 tonnes (46.0 long tons; 51.5 short tons) (BFM), 28.0 tonnes (27.6 long tons; 30.9 short tons) (B) and 27.5 tonnes (27.1 long tons; 30.3 short tons) (BS). Total length was 66.1 meters (217 ft). The first car was the only one equipped with motors; the four motors had a total power output of 353 kilowatts (473 hp). This allowed a maximum speed of 120 km/h (75 mph), and it was the first train in Norway able to run at this speed. The trains were painted beige (upper half) and deep blue (lower half), an until then unused color scheme in NSB. Only the Class 88 had a similar livery.

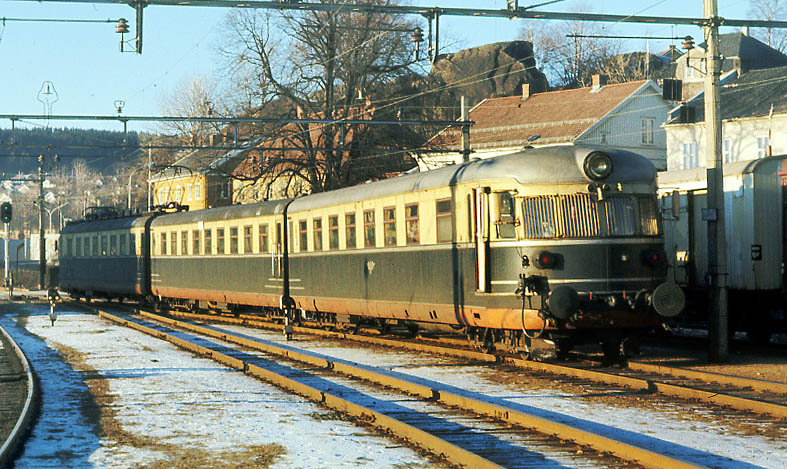
Unit at Larvik Station in 1971

Seating was carried for 170 passengers—46, 70 and 54 respectively for each car. The motor car had a saloon section with ten seats; however, this was converted to conventional seating in 1956. It also had a 15-square-meter (160 sq ft) cargo section. The center and end cars each had two sections, and the latter had a 13 m^{2} (140 sq ft) cargo area. However, 66.64 instead had a restaurant with 23 seats. This was for when the trains were planned to be used on the Dovre Line. However, the line was not electrified until after the class had been removed from service.

== Operation ==
Class 66 was put into service on the Østfold Line on 23 June 1946. It reduced travel time to Halden to 1 hour and 53 minutes, and was branded as the Østfold Express. From 16 February to 8 September 1946, it also had three weekly services that continued to Gothenburg, Sweden, as the Gothenburg Express. This was accomplished in 5 hours and 5 minutes. The high speed prohibited standing, and all passengers were required to purchase a seat reservation for 4 kr. Three units were in operation at any given time, while the fourth was at service or in reserve. This proved to be too optimistic—during the 1950s, there were several periods were the trains were taken out of service due to lack of maintenance. During 1954, Saturday trains were operated as double units.

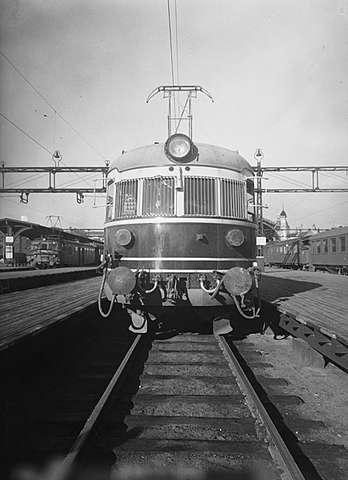
Class 66 from the front

On 9 June 1947, the class was also taken into use from Oslo West Station (Oslo V) on the Vestfold Line, and along the Sørlandet Line to Kongsberg. From the 1 June 1949, after the Sørlandet Line was electrified to Kristiansand, these services were shifted to the Sørlandet Express. On 15 November 1950, one unit was involved in the Hjuksebø train disaster, and the end car needed to be fully rebuilt. From 1 December 1956, when the whole Sørlandet Line to Stavanger was electrified, the service was extended and rebranded the Stavanger Express. To free up sufficient stock, the Østfold Express was discontinued on 14 November 1956. The Sørlandet Express operated each day, while the Stavanger Express only operated three times a week. However, the Stavanger Express did not prove a success, featuring low passenger numbers, and the last train ran on 24 August 1958. The trains remained in service on the Sørlandet Express until 27 May 1967.

During the 1960s, the new El 13 locomotives were delivered, and locomotive-hauled express trains replaced the multiple units. From 28 May 1967, Class 66 was moved to serve the Vestfold Line. It operated in services to Skien until 3 June 1973, after which it only served to Larvik. During the summer of 1975, they could also be seen operating Oslo V – Nelaug, and during the fall of 1976 on Oslo V – Drammen. The units were taken out of service on 21 May 1977. A single motor car, 66.01, has been preserved by the Norwegian Railway Museum, who has stationed it at Elverum Station.

== Incidents ==
On 15 November 1950, the Hjuksebø train disaster occurred, when a Class 66 train en route from Kristiansand to Oslo collided with freight cars that were running uncontrolled along the track between Hjuksebø and Holtås. The accident is among the most disastrous in Norwegian history, killing twelve people.

On 26 March 1957, motor car 66.03 and center car 18821 were damaged in a fire at Kristiansand. Both were retired due to the large damages. On 8 June 1969, a unit derailed at between Eidanger and Oklungen, but was restored. Motor car 66.02 was exposed to a fire on 4 June 1975, and again on 28 December 1976. After the latter incident, the car was retired.
