= Kleiver Tunnel =

Railway tunnel in Larvik, Norway

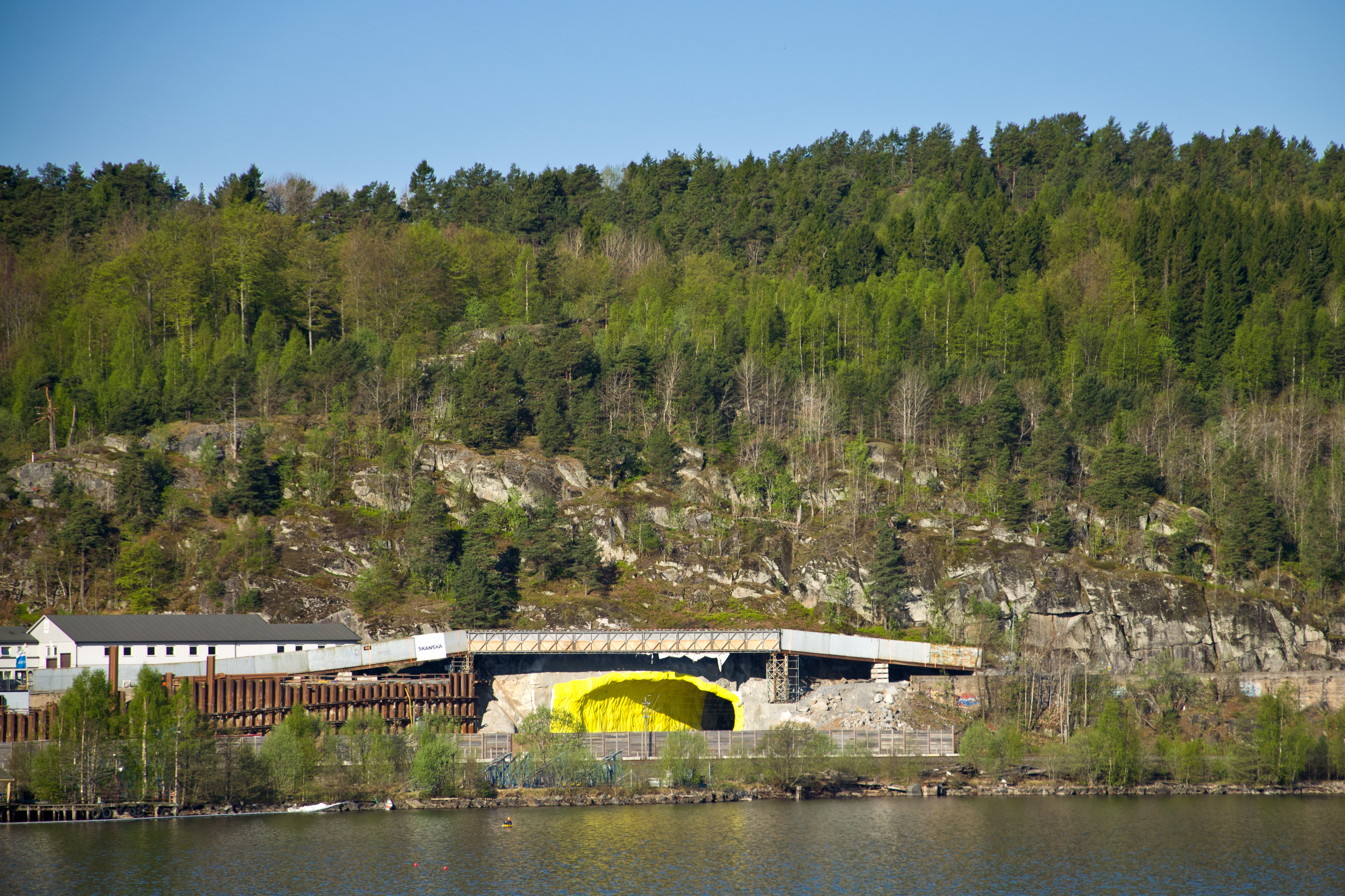
- Eastern entrance to the tunnel during construction in 2014
- Interactive map of Kleiver Tunnel

Overview
- Line: Vestfold Line
- Location: Martineåsen, Larvik Municipality, Norway
- Coordinates: 59.057°N 9.995°E
- Start: Farriseidet
- End: Paulertjønn

Operation
- Opened: 24 September 2018 (8 years ago)
- Owner: Bane Nor
- Character: High-speed passenger

Technical
- Line length: 3,670 m (12,040 ft)
- No. of tracks: Double
- Track gauge: 1,435 mm (4 ft 8 1/2 in)
- Electrified: 15 kV 16.7 Hz AC
- Operating speed: 250 km/h (160 mph)

The Kleiver Tunnell (Norwegian: Kleivertunnelen) is a 3.670-kilometer (2.280 mi) railway tunnel in Larvik Municipality, Norway. The tunnel carries for the most part two tracks of the Vestfold Line and is dimensioned for speeds up to 250 km/h (160 mph).

Construction started in 2013 and the tunnel opened on 24 September 2018 as part of the Farriseidet–Porsgrunn project. The tunnel is designed so it can be extended towards Larvik when a new railway route through Larvik has been designed upon. The eastern 800 meters (2,600 ft) of the tunnel are therefore single track and lack a high-speed profile, while the rest of the tunnel is double track. Once the tunnel has been extended, the single-track section will then be converted to an emergency exit.

== History ==
When the Vestfold Line was originally built in the second half of the 1870s, the route from Larvik to Eidanger was built along the west side of the lake Farris, through the hamlet of Oklungen and down the valley of Bjørkedal. The line from Larvik Station to Skien Station opened on 23 November 1882. The section from Larvik Station to Porsgrunn Station was 36.42 kilometers (22.63 mi) long, but had many curves, low speed and was prone to landslides. The Vestfold Line is largely used by regional trains, but had low speeds. In the late 2000s the average speed for trains between Skien and Oslo was 63 km/h (39 mph), and it was not uncommon to use coaches to freight passengers from the Grenland towns of Porsgrunn and Skien to Larvik. Plans to upgrade the Vestfold Line commenced in the early 1990s, and they concluded that the section between Larvik and Porsgrunn should be prioritized. Initial plans called for the route to be built as single track with two passing loops, and this was approved in 2002 and 2009. By then the government reconsidered and the National Rail Administration opted in 2010 to change their plans to double track.

Construction on the Farriseidet–Eidanger project started in 2012. The project consisted of 22 kilometers (14 mi) of double-track railway, designed for speeds of 250 km/h (160 mph). The project consisted of seven tunnels and ten bridges, costing a total of 7.4 billion Norwegian kroner. The project allowed travel time from Porsgrunn to Larvik to be cut from 34 to 12 minutes.

Groundwork for the project was split into four contracts, the westernmost which included the Kleiver Tunnel. Skanska won the contract and work started on 3 June 2013. The 9.6-kilometer (6.0 mi) section cost 1342 million kroner, which in addition to the Kleiver Tunnel consisted of two additional tunnels, two wildlife crossings and six bridges. After the Holm–Nykirke project further north on the Vestfold Line, Farriseidet–Porsgrunn is the second section of railway in Norway dimensioned for speeds of 250 km/h (160 mph). This resulted in the tunnel cross-section increasing from 90 to 120 m^{2} (970 to 1,290 sq ft). Uncommon for Norwegian tunnels was also the use of prefabricated concrete elements for lining the tunnels. Between construction started and completed, the name of the tunnel was changed from Martineåsen Tunnel to Kleiver Tunnel, in order to avoid confusion with the freeway tunnel on the E18. The entire line was opened on 24 September 2018.

== Specifications ==
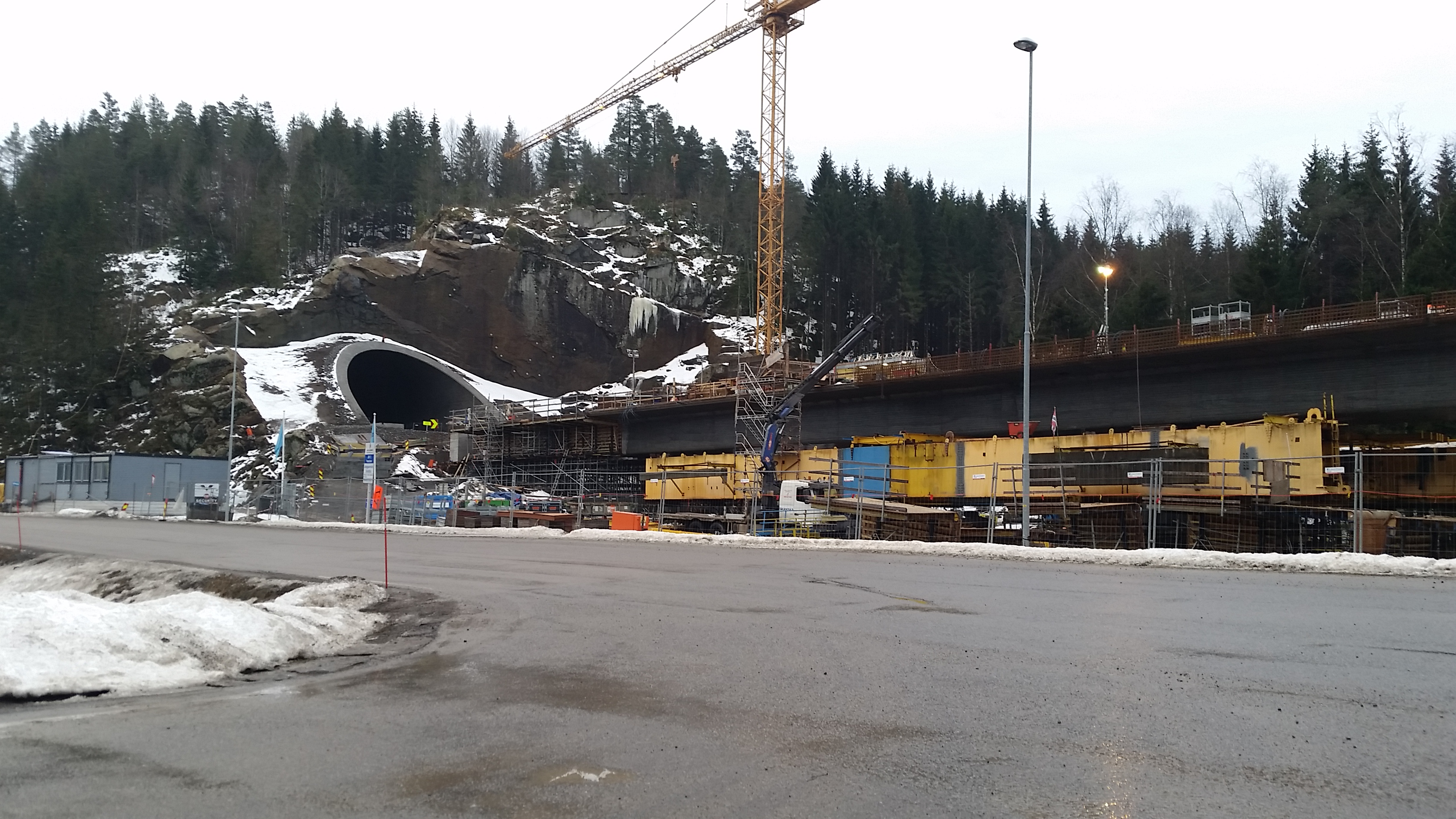
The tunnel's western entrance and the Paulertjønn Bridge during construction in 2016

The Kleiver Tunnel is 3,670 meters (12,040 ft) long. The eastern entrance is located at Farriseidet on the shores of the lake Farris, next to where the E18 crosses over from the Farris Bridge to Martineåsen Tunnel. The western entrance is situated at Paulertjønn. At this side the tracks immediately to from the tunnel onto the Paulertjønn Bridge.

While most of the tunnel is double track and dimensioned for speeds of 250 km/h (160 mph), the easternmost 800 meters (2,600 ft) are single track and lack high-speed profile. This allows the tunnel to connect to the existing railway line through Larvik. The double-track section has been designed to that it easily can be extended towards Larvik, when a new right-of-way has been decided upon. The tunnel is standard gauge, electrified at 15 kV 16.7 Hz AC. Conventional signaling has been installed, but preparations have been made for the tunnel to be upgraded to European Rail Traffic Management System.
