= Hjuksebø train collision =

1950 rail accident in Norway

Hjuksebø train disaster

Details
- Date: 15 November 1950; 10:50
- Location: 3 km south of Hjuksebø station 93 km (58 mi) SW from Oslo
- Coordinates: 59°28′07″N 9°19′51″E
- Country: Norway
- Line: Sørlandet Line
- Incident type: Collision
- Cause: Runaway freight wagons

Statistics
- Trains: 2
- Passengers: 19
- Deaths: 14

The Hjuksebø train disaster occurred on the Sørlandet Line between Hjuksebø and Holtsås, Telemark, Norway on 15 November 1950. The Kristiansand-to-Oslo express had been due to pass through Hjuksebø, but was delayed, and the shunter believed he had time to turn a waiting freight-train around before it arrived, by shunting a number of freight cars out of the way. As he had failed to attach them to the engine, however, the cars ran downhill towards Holtsås station, straight into the express, killing fourteen. At the time, it was Norway's worst peacetime railway accident.

== Prelude to the disaster ==
The passenger train was no. 72, en route from Kristiansand to Oslo. It consisted of a three-car NSB Class 66 electric multiple unit, which NSB operated on the line as a "lyntog" ("lightning train"). In the control car at the front of the train was driver Emil Grimsrud. It had left Kristiansand at 08:00, by the time the train left Nordagutu at 10:45 it was eight minutes behind schedule.

Up at Hjuksebø station, at 10:40 passenger train no. 5443 had arrived after a trip on Bratsberg Line from Notodden. It entered track 2 on the station. Already assembled at this track were seven freight cars, which were supposed to be attached to train no. 5444, on a trip back to Notodden. In order to ready this train, these freight cars would need to be shunted out of the way, so that the engine could make a turn-around for the return journey.

== Breakaway from Hjuksebø ==
Normally, the operation of preparing the freight train would wait until the passenger express train from Kristiansand had passed through Hjuksebø, but on this day the shunter at the station was informed that the express was a few minutes delayed. With this extra time, he decided that there was sufficient time to execute the turn-around operation now. The engine of train 5443 was detached from its carriages and pushed the freight cars ahead of it southwards with the intention of pulling them back in on track 3, ready for the return journey. Unfortunately, the four freight cars at the front were not attached to the rest of the train.

South of Hjuksebø, the line slopes downwards towards Holtsås station. The shunter made a desperate attempt to run and catch up with the runaway cars, hoping to jump on it and engage the emergency brake. The shunter was able at first to clamber onto one of the cars but was blocked from getting to the front of the runaway cars where the crucial brake was located, so he was forced to jump off and try to run alongside it to reach the front. The breakaway cars were now speeding up and the shunter failed to make it. The engine which had pushed the cars followed, after the runaway, hooting a warning signal to warn trains ahead of the danger.

The station master at Hjuksebø realised the impending danger and called down to Holtsås hoping to stop the incoming passenger train no. 72. The call was too late, and the runaway freight cars and the train no. 72 collided at 10:50.

== Collision ==
The runaway cars had travelled for almost three kilometres before they ploughed into the incoming express, and the speed was probably around 60 km/h. The express train was moving at 70–75 km/h, in spite of its emergency brake being pulled in the seconds before the collision.

The leading freight car in the runaway was loaded with wooden logs for setting up telegraph poles, and this added to the damage. The cargo ripped open the front car of the express train where the train driver and 19 passengers were sitting. The driver and 11 passengers were killed instantly, and a further 2 died later from their injuries. The survivors in the front carriage had sustained serious injuries.

== Salvage operation ==
Men from Norsk Hydro at Notodden were sent to the wreckage site with burners who could cut the trapped passengers away from the mangled train.

The two remaining cars in the wreckage were not seriously damaged, and a salvage train from Skien hauled those cars back to Nordagutu. By 23:05 that night workers had managed to clear the line and open it for traffic again, while the line was closed trains were re-routed over Vestfoldbanen.

At 12:06 a hospital train left Drammen towards the wreck site, but by the time it arrived at 13:30 the injured had already been sent to a hospital at Notodden.

== Aftermath ==
The shunter who had overseen the ill-fated operation at Hjuksebø was sorrow-stricken and on sick leave after the accident. He was eventually moved to a new station where he was not put in charge of any operations with a serious safety hazard. Although there were calls for disciplinary action against the shunter, the investigation revealed that other people involved were also at fault, as well as the prevailing routines followed at Hjuksebø station at the time. No charges or sanctions were levied against those involved.

There were demands that the Norwegian State Railways compensate the survivors of the Hjuksebø disaster victims, and the injured passengers. These demands were finally settled around the middle of the 1950s.

In monetary terms, the accident cost NSB about 910,000 Norwegian krone. The accident caused the Parliament of Norway to consider the introduction of train radios on board Norwegian trains.
