= Vestmarka Line =

Railway line in Norway

Overview
- Native name: Vestmarkabanen
- Status: Abandonend
- Owner: Norwegian State Railways
- Locale: Eidskog Municipality
- Termini: Skotterud; Vestmarka

Service
- Type: Railway
- System: Norwegian railway
- Operator(s): Norwegian State Railways

History
- Opened: 15 October 1918
- Closed: 1 June 1965

Technical
- Line length: 14.25 kilometres (9 mi)
- Number of tracks: Single
- Character: Passenger and freight
- Track gauge: 1,435 mm (4 ft 8 1/2 in)
- Electrification: No

The Vestmarka Line (Norwegian: Vestmarkabanen) is an abandoned railway between Skotterud and Vestmarka in Eidskog Municipality, Norway. The line was 14.3 kilometers long and opened on 15 October 1918. The line was the first railway in Norway to close to passengers, on 3 January 1931. Freight transport between Buåa and Vestmarka was terminated on 15 February 1961 and the line completely terminated on 1 June 1965.
