= Kjose Station =

Railway station in Larvik, Norway

Kjose
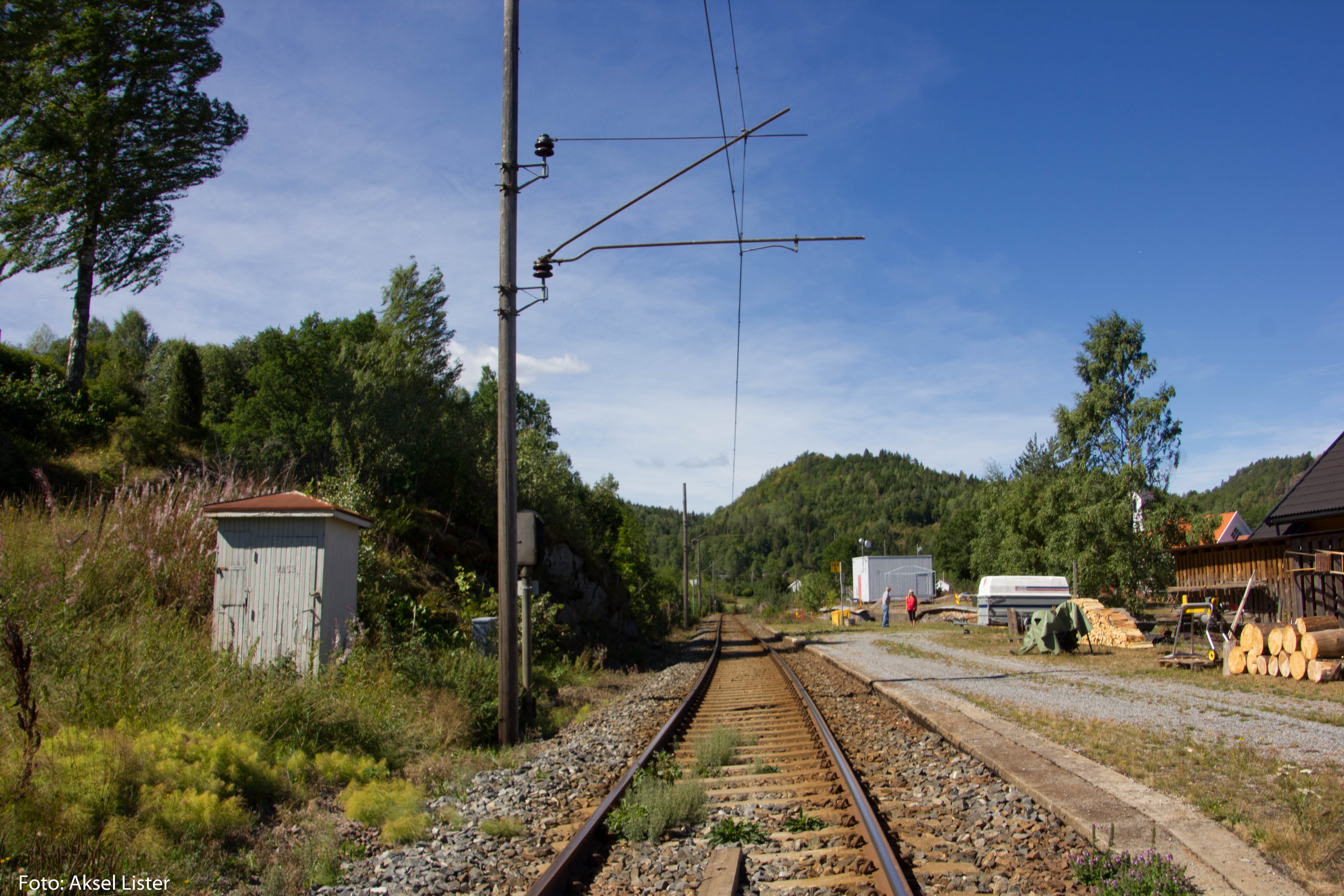
- Kjose railway

General information
- Location: Kjose, Larvik Municipality; Norway
- Coordinates: 59°06′26″N 9°55′11″E
- Elevation: 31.5 m (103 ft)
- Line: Vestfold Line
- Distance: 169.47 km (105.30 mi)
- Platforms: 2

History
- Opened: 1882
Location

Kjose Station (Norwegian: Kjose stasjon) is a former railway station on the Vestfold Line in the village of Kjose in Larvik Municipality, Norway. The station was served by regional trains operated by the Norwegian State Railways and opened as part of the Vestfold Line in 1882.

Preceding station		Following station
Eikenes	Vestfold Line	Larvik
