= Hjuksebø Station =

Railway station in Hjuksebø, Norway

Hjuksebø
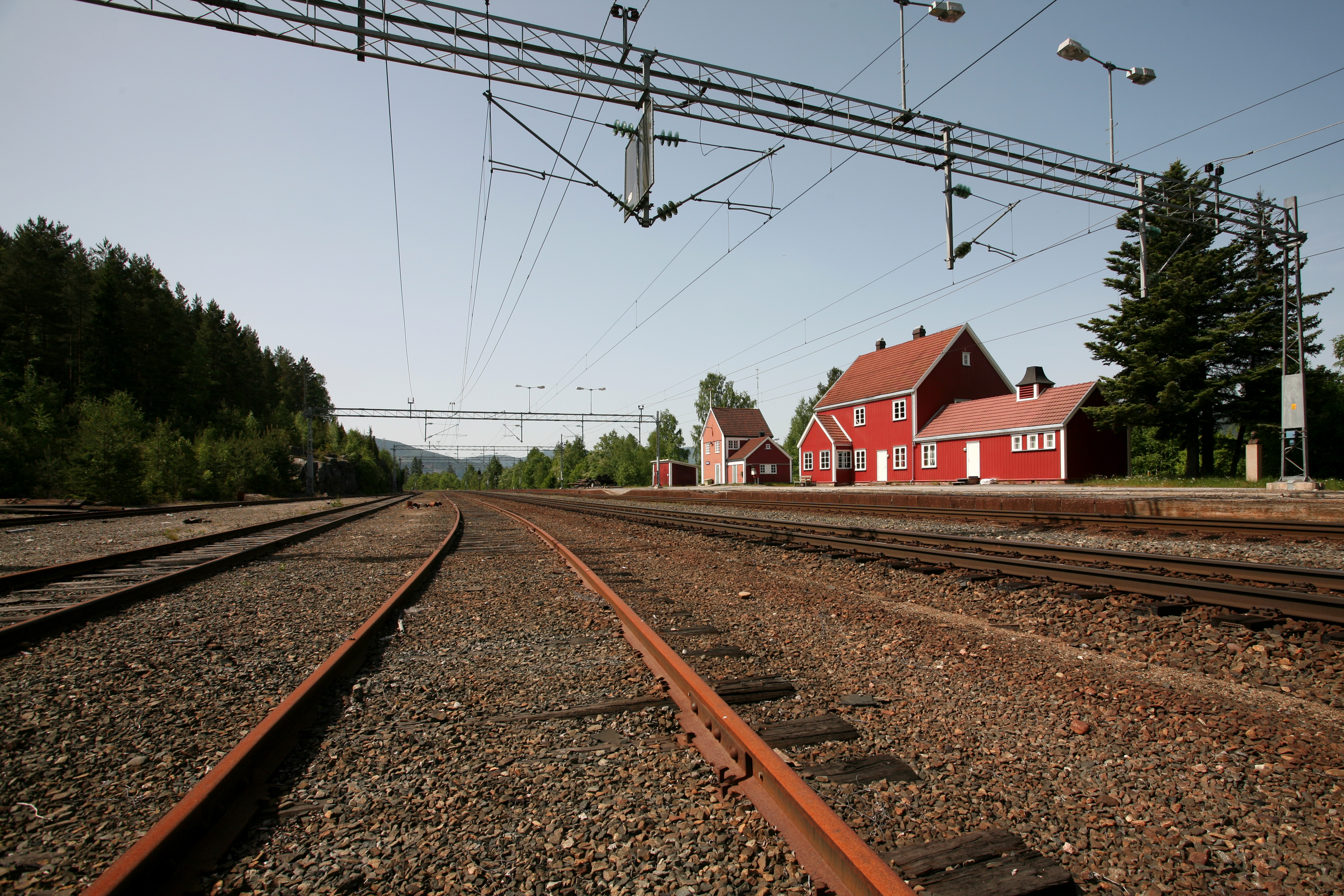

General information
- Location: Hjuksebø, Notodden Municipality; Norway
- Coordinates: 59.51742°N 9.31692°E
- Elevation: 156.7 m (514 ft)
- Owner: Norwegian State Railways
- Lines: Bratsberg Line, Sørland Line
- Distance: 136.24 km (84.66 mi)

History
- Opened: 13 December 1917
Location

Hjuksebø Station (Norwegian: Hjuksebø stasjon) is a former railway station on the Sørland Line and the Bratsberg Line, located at Hjuksebø in Notodden Municipality, Norway (historically it was part of the old Sauherad Municipality).

Preceding station		Following station
Nordagutu; Kleivrud	Bratsberg Line	Notodden; Trykkerud
Nordagutu; Kleivrud	Sørland Line	Kongsberg; Øysteinstul
