= Oklungen Station =

Railway station in Porsgrunn, Norway

Oklungen
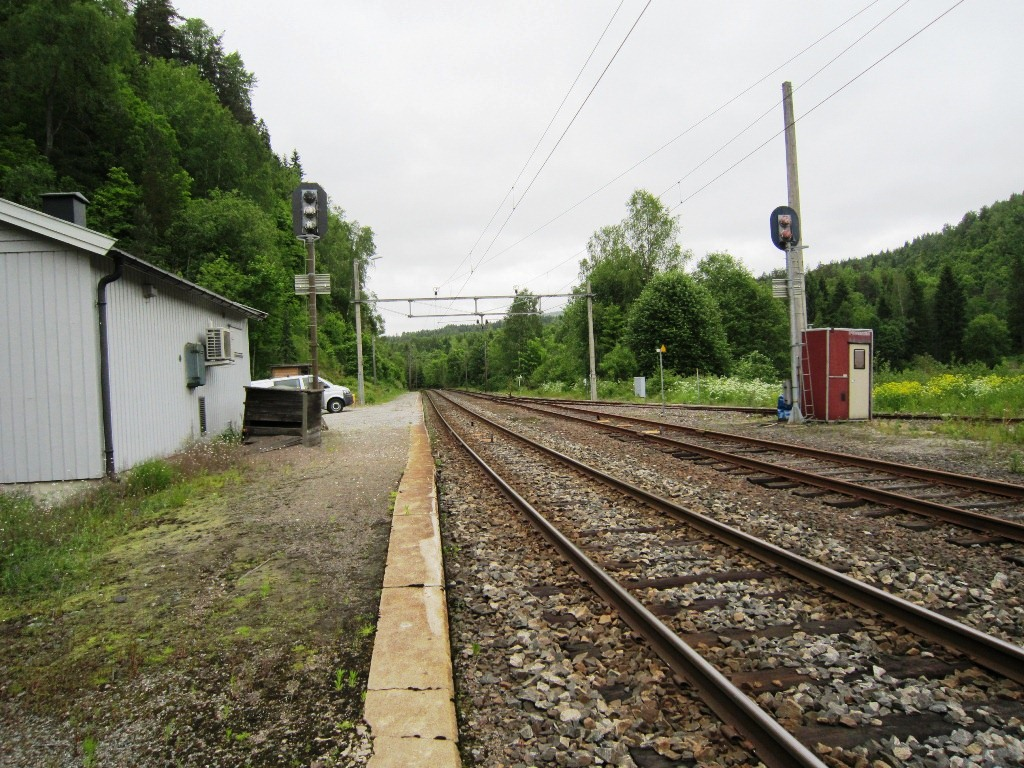

General information
- Location: Oklungen, Porsgrunn; Norway
- Coordinates: 59°10′45″N 9°48′28″E
- Elevation: 45.1 m (148 ft)
- Line: Vestfold Line
- Distance: 182.10 km (113.15 mi)
- Platforms: 1

History
- Opened: 1899
Location

Oklungen Station (Norwegian: Oklungen stasjon) is a former railway station on the Vestfold Line in the village of Oklungen in Porsgrunn, Norway. The station was served by regional trains operated by the Norwegian State Railways. The station opened as part of Vestfold Line in 1882.

Preceding station		Following station
Porsgrunn	Vestfold Line	Eikenes
