= Nordagutu Station =

Railway station in Midt-Telemark, Norway

Nordagutu
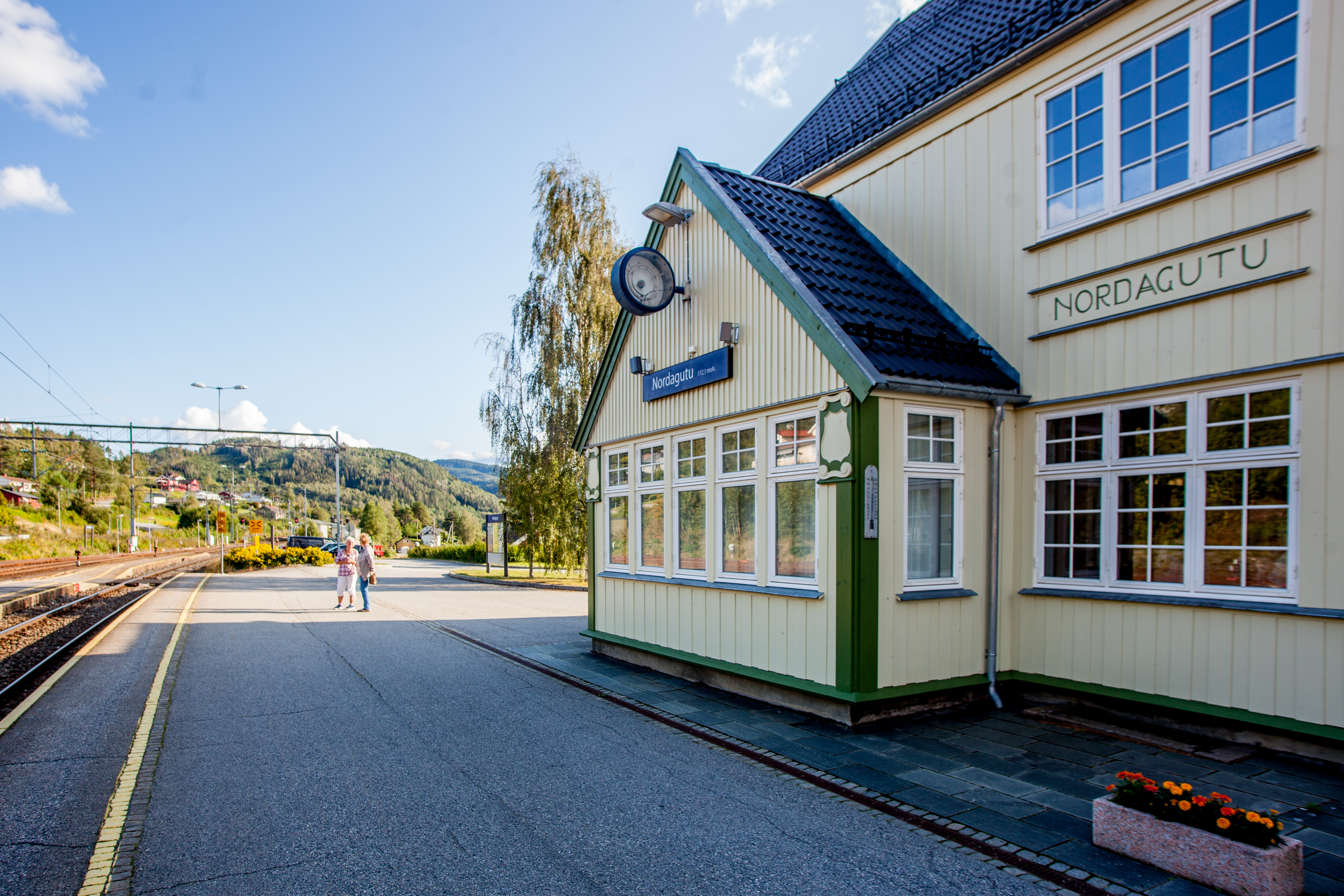
- In October 2019

General information
- Location: Nordagutu, Midt-Telemark Municipality; Norway
- Coordinates: 59.417842°N 9.32297°E
- Elevation: 112.1 m (368 ft)
- Owner: Bane NOR
- Operator: Go-Ahead Norge; Vy
- Lines: Bratsberg Line; Sørlandet Line
- Platforms: 2
- Connections: Bus: Farte

Other information
- Station code: NGU

History
- Opened: 1917
Location

Nordagutu Station (Norwegian: Nordagutu stasjon) is a railway station in Midt-Telemark Municipality in Telemark county, Norway located on the Sørlandet Line and the Bratsberg Line. The station is served by express trains to Kristiansand and local trains to Notodden and Grenland. The station's main purpose is to allow transfers between the two railway lines, thus giving passengers from Notodden and Grenland access to Sørlandet Line, and vice versa.

== History ==
The station was opened in 1917 as part of the Bratsberg Line, and in 1924 became part of the Sørlandet Line when it was expanded to Bø Municipality.

== Gallery ==
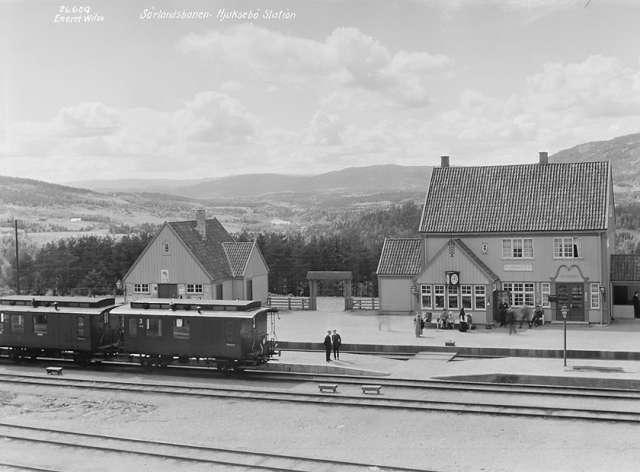
On June 2, 1925

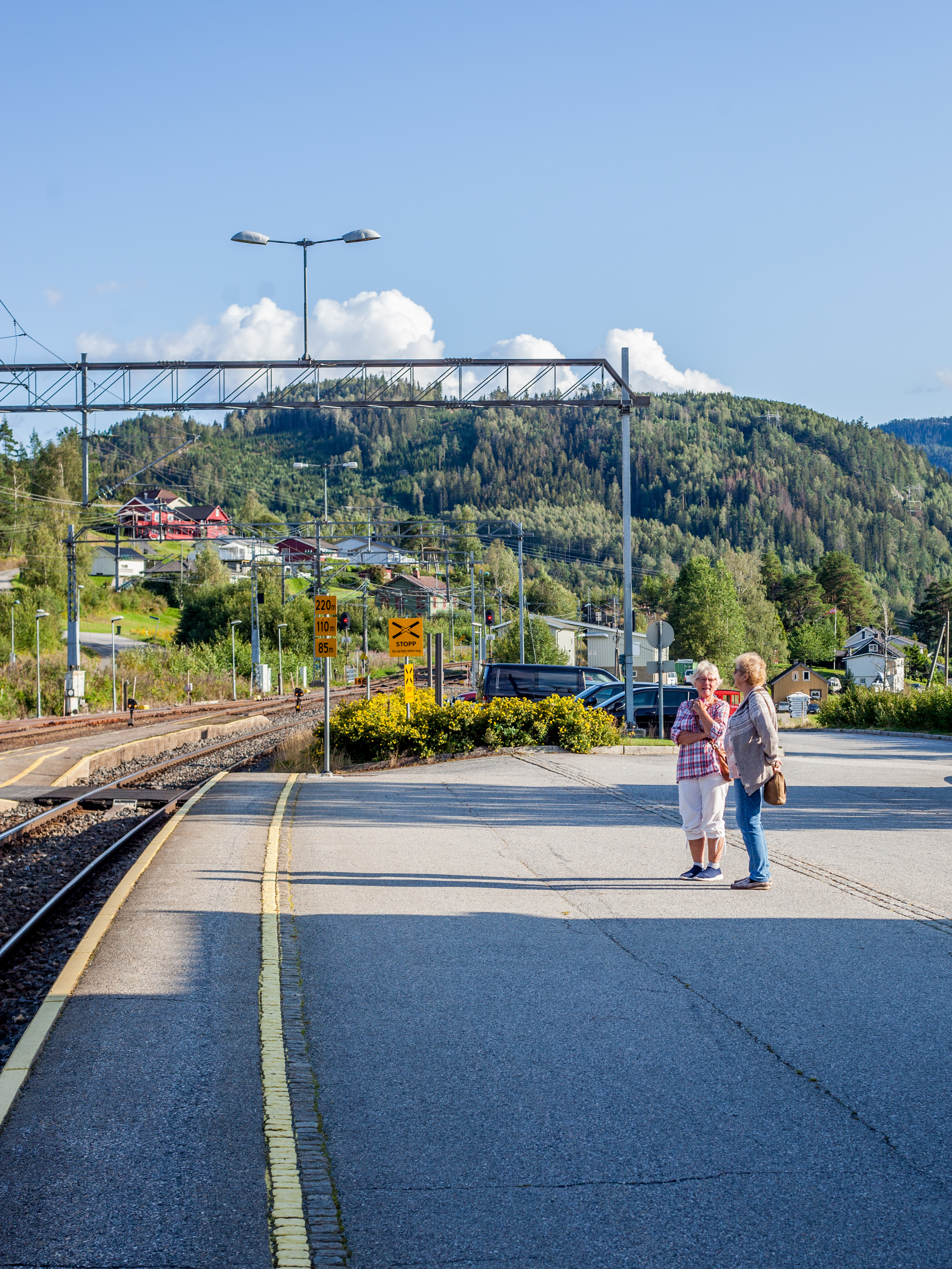
Platform of the station in 2019

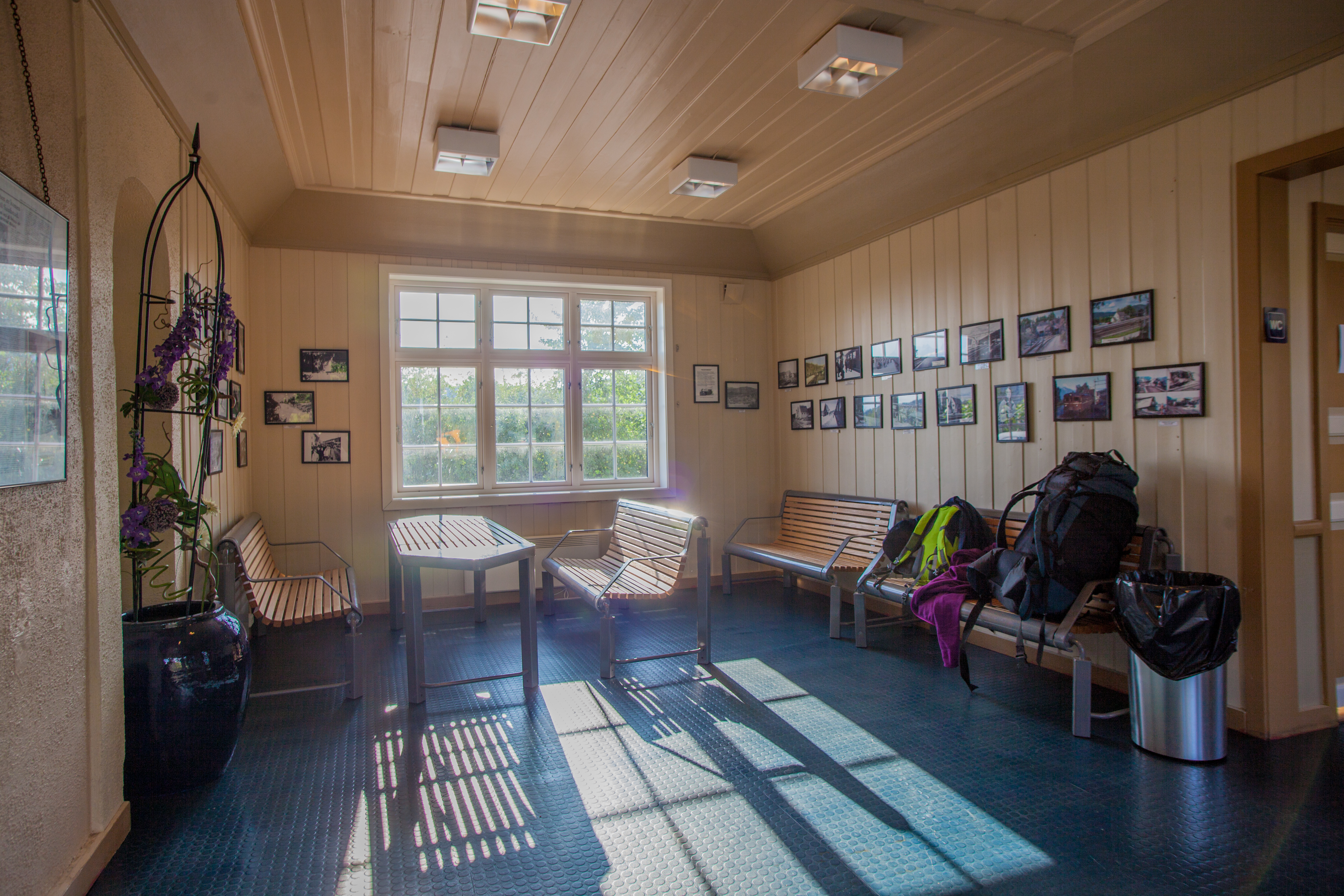
Interior in 2019

Preceding station	Express trains	Following station
Bø towards Stavanger	F5	Kongsberg towards Oslo S
Preceding station	Regional trains	Following station
Nisterud towards Porsgrunn	R55	Notodden Terminus
