= Eikenes Station =

Railway station in Larvik, Norway

Eikenes
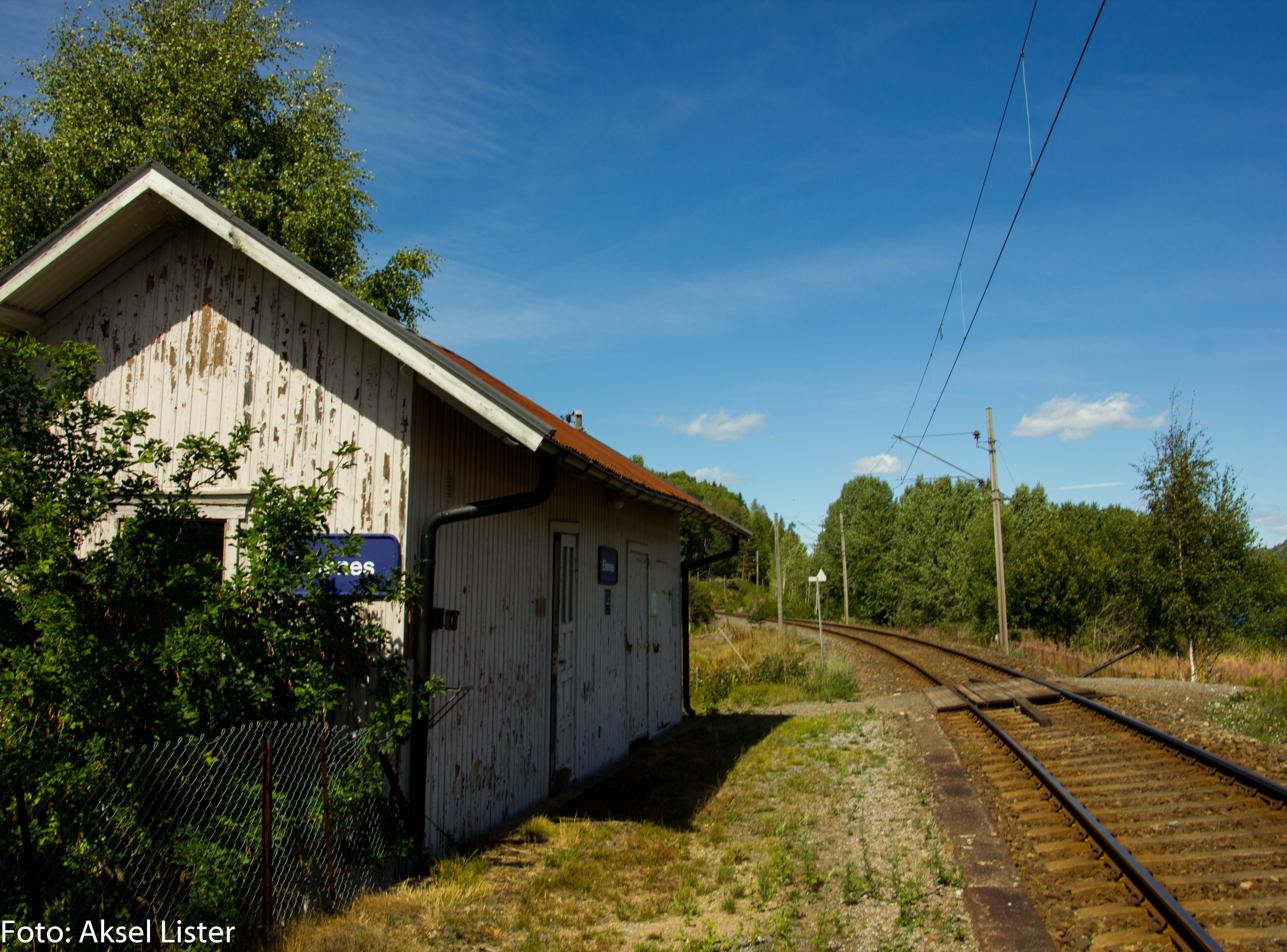

General information
- Location: Eikenes, Larvik Municipality; Norway
- Coordinates: 59°08′49″N 9°53′45″E
- Elevation: 31.7 m (104 ft)
- Line: Vestfold Line
- Distance: 174.64 km (108.52 mi)
- Platforms: 1

History
- Opened: 1899
Location

Eikenes Station (Norwegian: Eikenes holdeplass) is a former railway station on the Vestfold Line serving the village of Eikenes in Larvik Municipality, Norway. The station was served by regional trains operated by the Norwegian State Railways. The station opened in 1899.

Preceding station		Following station
Oklungen	Vestfold Line	Kjose
