= Flåm Station =

Railway station in Aurland, Norway

Flåm Station Flåm stasjon
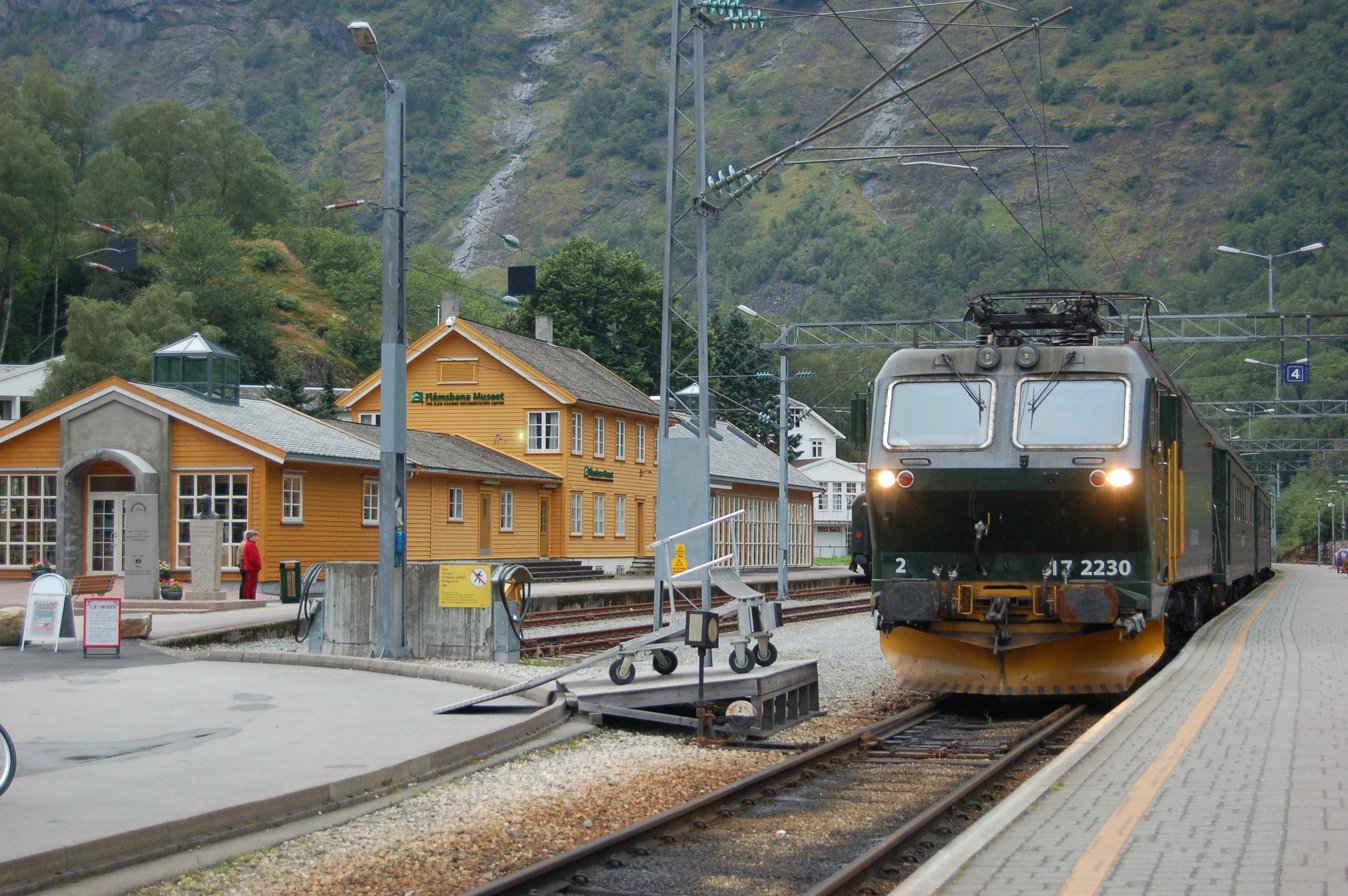
- An NSB El 17 at Flåm Station

General information
- Location: Flåm, Aurland Municipality; Norway
- Coordinates: 60.86282°N 7.11369°E
- Elevation: 2 m (6 ft 7 in)
- System: Railway station
- Owner: Bane NOR
- Operator: Flåm Utvikling (Vy)
- Line: Flåmsbanen
- Distance: 356.00 km (221.21 mi)

Other information
- Station code: IATA code: XGH

History
- Opened: 1 August 1940
Location

Flåm Station (Norwegian: Flåm stasjon) is a railway station located at the village of Flåm in Aurland Municipality, Norway. The station marks the terminus for the Flåm Line (Flåmsbana). The station is served by the tourist trains on the Flåm Line and operated by Vy as a subcontractor for Flåm Utvikling.

== History ==
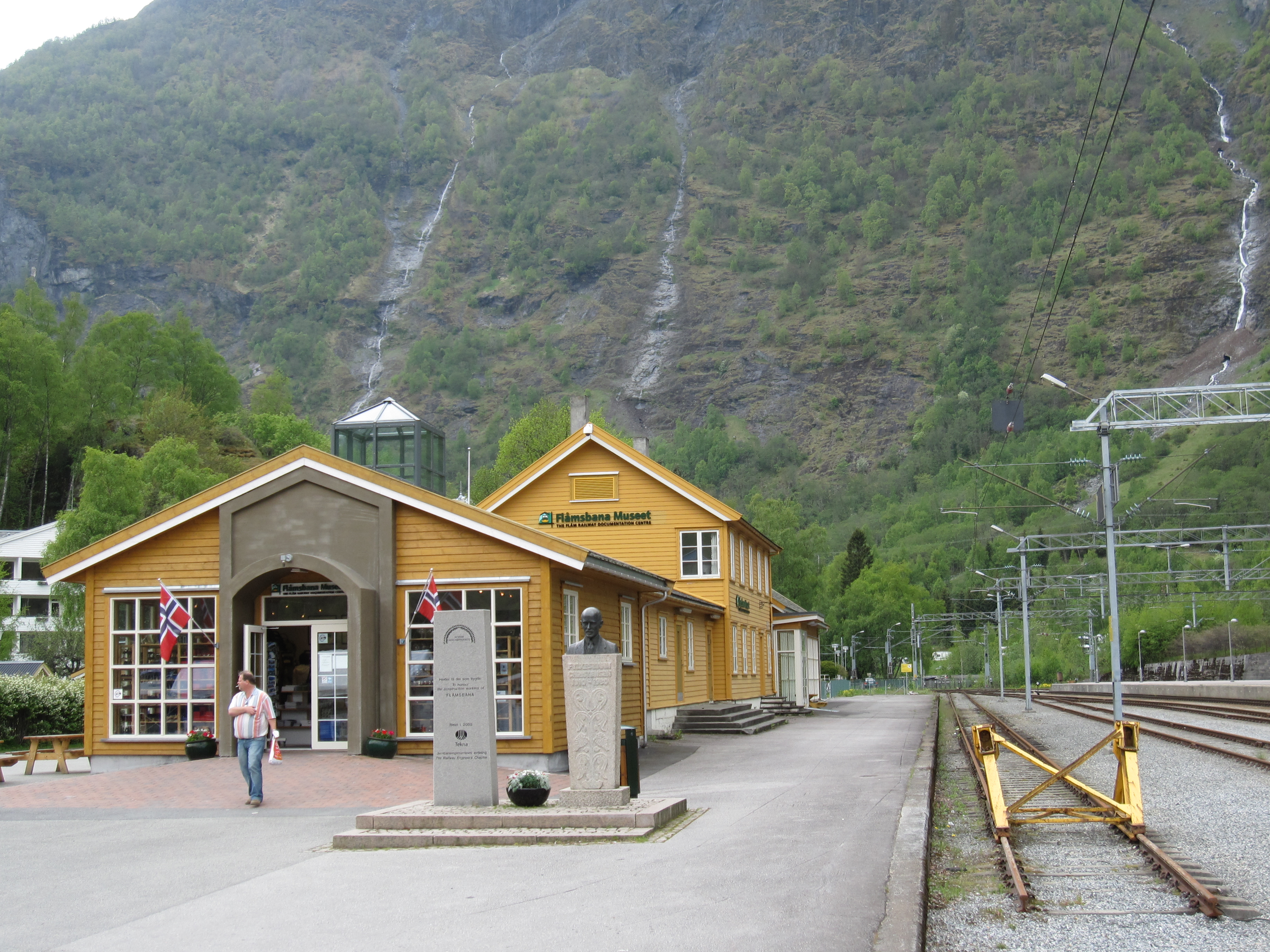
Flåm Railway Museum

The station opened on 1 August 1940 for freight, and the year after for passenger traffic. The station was built to allow transfer from ferries operating on Sognefjord to the Bergen Line at Myrdal Station. Marketing of the service was transferred to Flåm Utvikling in 1998; after this a new station building was opened, and the old station building converted to a railway museum.

Flåm is one of Norway's largest tourist attractions, with an estimated half a million visitors annually. The Flåm Railway Documentation Centre provides information into the building of the Flåm Railway and the technical challenge facing this engineering work through the use of different exhibitions with text, image and sound.

Preceding station		Following station
Terminus	Flåm Line	Lunden
