= Skien Station =

Railway station in Skien, Norway

Skien
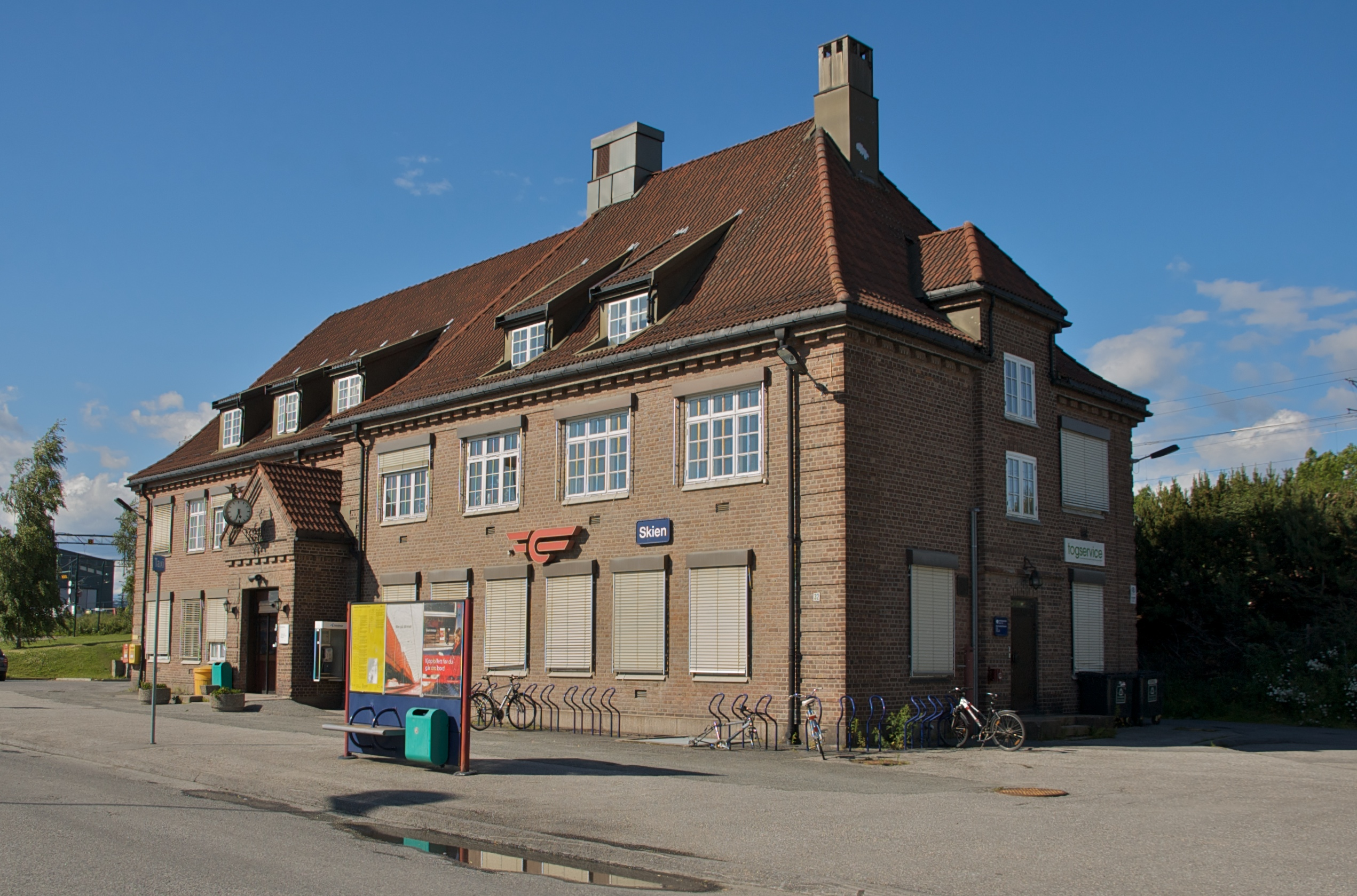
- Skien Station

General information
- Location: Skien, Skien Municipality; Norway
- Coordinates: 59°13′07″N 9°36′13″E
- Owner: Bane NOR
- Operator: Vy
- Lines: Bratsberg Line; Vestfold Line
- Distance: 180.50 km (112.16 mi)
- Platforms: 3
- Connections: Bus: Farte

Construction
- Architect: Gudmund Hoel with Bjarne Friis Baastad and Ragnvald Utne

History
- Opened: 13 December 1917
Location

Skien Station (Norwegian: Skien stasjon) is a railway station located about one kilometer from the center of the city of Skien in Skien Municipality in Telemark county, Norway.

The station serves as terminus for the regional trains on the Vestfold Line (Vestfoldbanen) from Oslo via Vestfold and for the local trains to Notodden on the Bratsberg Line. The station was opened in 1917 as part of the Bratsberg Line. Skien Station was built following designs by Gudmund Hoel with Bjarne Friis Baastad and Ragnvald Utne.

Following protest, the old Skien station (Skien gamle stasjon), which was located two kilometers further south, remained in operation from 1927 until 1963.

Preceding station	Regional trains	Following station
Terminus	RE11	Porsgrunn towards Eidsvoll
Nisterud towards Notodden	R55	Porsgrunn Terminus
