= Notodden Public Transport Terminal =

Bus and railway station in Notodden, Norway

Coordinates: 59°33′22.95″N 9°15′20.92″E

Notodden
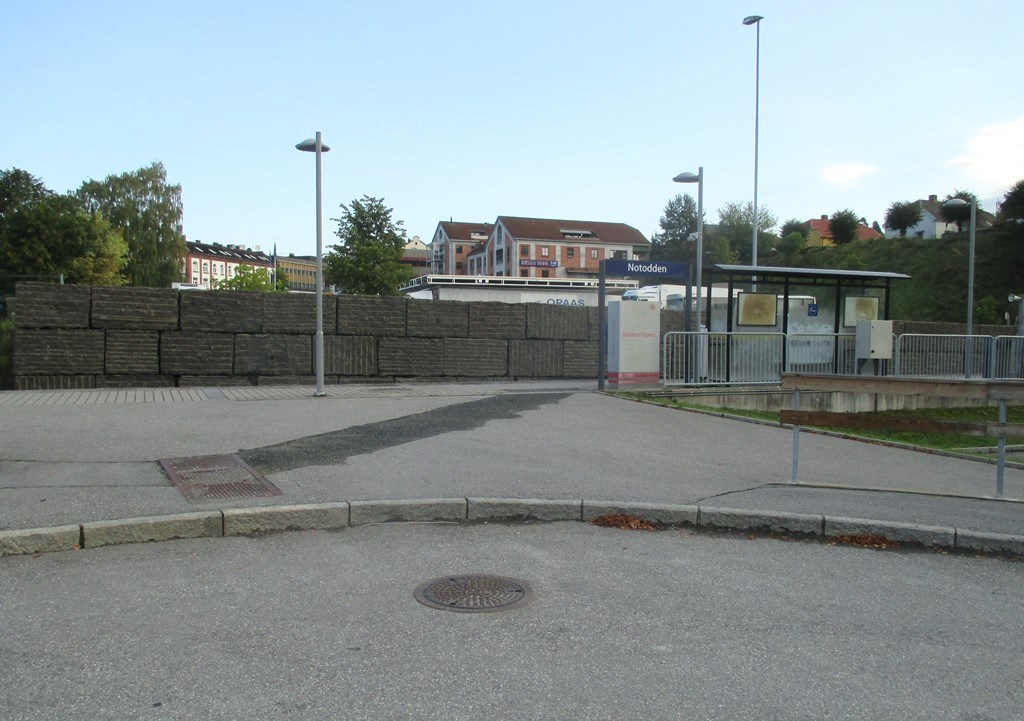

General information
- Location: Downtown Notodden, Notodden Municipality; Norway
- Owner: Bane NOR
- Operator: Vy
- Line: Tinnoset Line
- Platforms: 1
- Connections: Bus: Farte; Vy express: VY1; NOR-WAY: NW180

History
- Opened: 24 September 2002 (bus); 25 August 2004 (rail)
- Closed: 9 August 2015 (rail)
Location

Notodden Public Transport Terminal (Norwegian: Notodden kollektivterminal) is a bus station opened in 2002, and between 2004 and 2015 also a railway station, serving the town of Notodden in Notodden Municipality in Telemark county, Norway. Traditionally located on the Bratsberg Line, it was since 2008 been regarded as part of the Tinnoset Line. The station has only one track and one platform, and was served by hourly trains to Grenland by NSB. From 10 August 2015 until 12 December 2020, the rail traffic was moved back to Notodden New Station. However, from the introduction of the new timetable on 13 December, this station came back into use.

== History ==
Notodden Old Station was the first station to serve Notodden, and was taken into use when Tinnoset Line opened in 1909. When the extension line of the Bratsberg Line was opened in 1917 Notodden New Station was taken into use. After operations on the Tinnoset Line were terminated in 1991, plans to move the station closer to town were made, and in 2004 the new public transport terminal was taken into use. This station is 800 meters (2,600 ft) closer to town than the old one, but the final stretch is not electrified like the rest of Bratsberg- and Tinnoset Line.

Preceding station	Regional trains	Following station
Nordagutu towards Porsgrunn	R55	Terminus
