= Bratsberg Line =

Railway line in Telemark, Norway

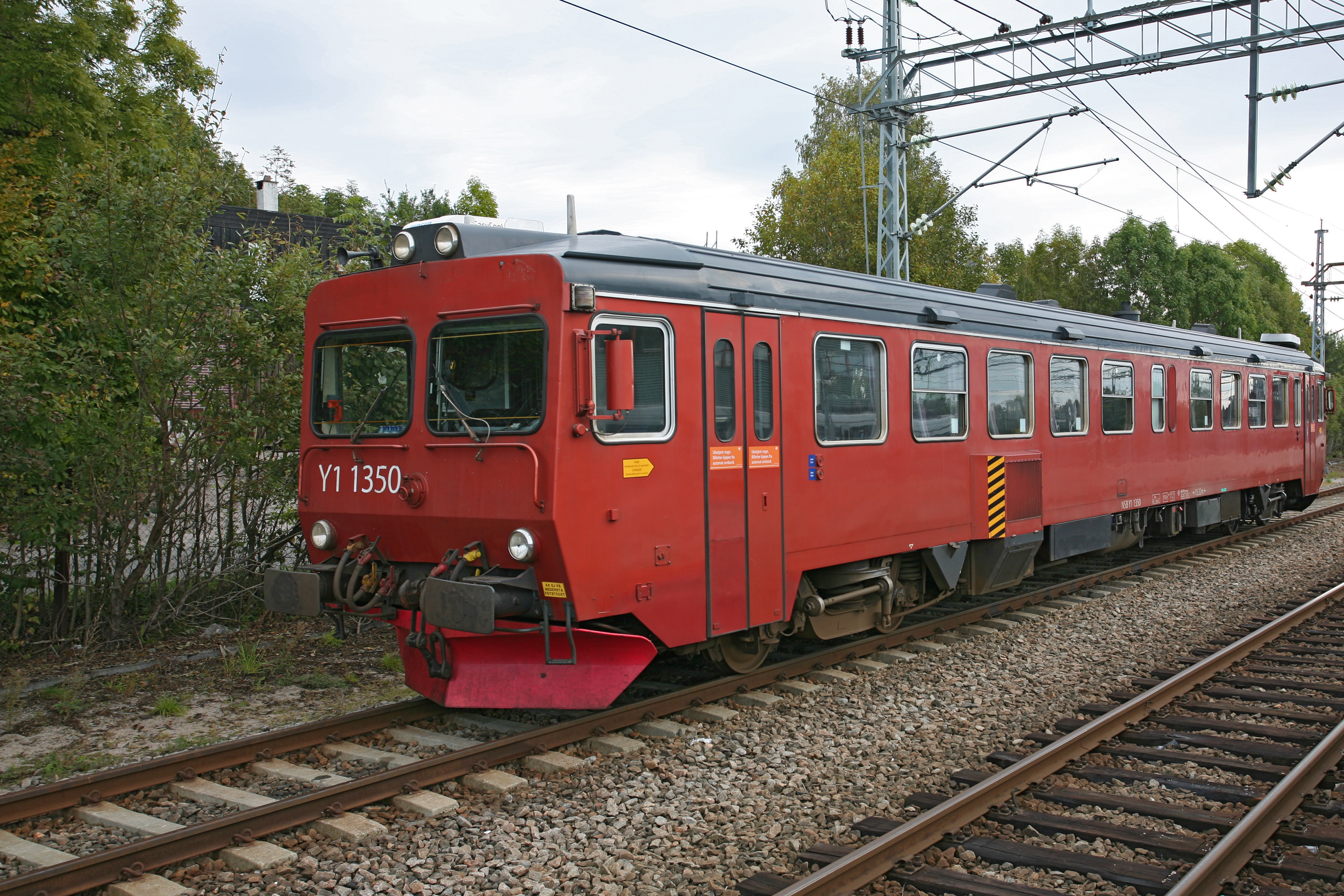
- Diesel Y1 railcar at Skien Station.

Overview
- Native name: Bratsbergbanen
- Owner: Bane NOR
- Termini: Notodden; Eidanger
- Stations: 5

Service
- Type: Railway
- System: Norwegian railway network
- Operator: Vy
- Rolling stock: Class 69

History
- Opened: 4 December 1916

Technical
- Line length: 74 kilometres (46 mi)
- Number of tracks: Single
- Track gauge: 1,435 mm (4 ft 8 1/2 in) standard gauge
- Electrification: 15 kV 16.7 Hz AC
- Operating speed: Max. 110 kilometres per hour (68 mph)

The Bratsberg Line (Norwegian: Bratsbergbanen) is a 74-kilometre-long (46 mi) railway line between Eidanger and Notodden in Telemark county, Norway. It opened in 1917, connecting the Tinnos Line, the Sørland Line and the Vestfold Line; allowing Norsk Hydro to transport fertilizer from their plant at Rjukan to the port in Skien. Since 1991 only passenger trains are operated, using Class 69 stock by Vy.

The railway is single track and features Norway's tallest railway bridge, Hjukse Bridge at 65 metres (213 ft). It is owned by the Norwegian National Rail Administration

== Service ==
Vy operates three Class 69 EMUs between Notodden and Porsgrunn each hour.

== History ==
=== Background ===
The need for a railway line from Notodden to Skien was driven forward by two key circumstances; the need for a railway to replace the Telemark Canal, and the construction of the Sørlandet Line.

From the opening in 1909 Rjukan Salpeterfrabrik had transported their ammonia for shipment from Skien along the Rjukan Line, the Tinnsjø railway ferry and the Tinnos Line to Notodden, where the ammonia was transferred from railway wagons to barges and shipped down 54 kilometres (34 mi) along the Telemark Canal to Skien. At the time many locals wanted to expand the canal instead of building a railway—to allow ocean-going vessels to enter the port at Notodden and removing the need for transshipment in Skien. Plans were launched by Sigurd Kloumann in 1911, but rejected by the management of Norsk Hydro who preferred a continual railway line.

The Sørland Line (at the time called the Vestland Line) was intended to follow an inland route, and have several branch lines out to the most important cities—including Skien and Notodden. At Skien Bratsbergbanen would connect to the Vestfold Line that continues to Porsgrunn and through Vestfold back to Drammen. The Bratsberg Line would run as part of the Sørland Line between Hjuksebø to Nordagutu, branching off at those two stations.

There were two proposed routes, running on each side of the lake Norsjø. An eastern solution would be shorter and provide easier transport for Norsk Hydro, but would serve a smaller population that a western route; supporters of the eastern route pointed out that with a western route Notodden would be closer to Drammen than Skien—a possible deteriorating effect on Telemark as a county. The western route would be 55 km, while the eastern routes would be 76 km via Gvarv and 94 via Lunde.

=== Negotiations ===
The proposal for the Bratsberg Line was to incorporate the Tinnos Line, allowing seamless operations. The Norwegian State Railways (NSB) negotiated with Norsk Transport, the Norsk Hydro subsidiary that operated the railways, and on 31 May 1913 they reached an agreement to create a company that would build the new railway and take over ownership of the Tinnos Line. Total equity would be NOK 16.5 million, where NSB would finance the whole new line while Norsk Transport would receive stocks of NOK 5.4 million—half in preferred shares and half in common shares—for the incorporation of the Tinnos Line and NOK 4.2 million was for the state financed part of the Sørland Line from Notodden to Nordagutu. Private investors would be allowed to sign shares for 5.9 million in preferred shares. As a result, NSB would have to guarantee a dividend of five percent to the private owners.

In parliament this was seen as a pure gift to foreign capital interests; the state would with the agreement have to insure the profits of the company to foreign investors, and a short section of the Sørland Line would be privately owned. Parliament instead suggested that NSB be given the preferred shares, and all new equity be signed by the state; now Norsk Transport would have to guarantee for the profits for the state. Budget exceeding would be covered by new shares sold to the state, and the company would build up a fund for the later expropriation of the line. The final decision to build the line was made by parliament on 25 July 1913. An agreement with Norsk Transport was made on 4 October 1913, which dictated that the Tinnos Line was transferred to the state from 1 July earlier the same year.

=== Construction ===
Construction started in 1913, with cost estimates at NOK 11.1 million; higher wages, inflation, lack of work force and geological difficulties around Skien pressed the final cost to NOK 21.9 million. The line was built with electric traction—just like the Tinnos Line and the Rjukan Line. In Skien a controversy concerning the location of the new station arose; many locals claimed the station was too far out of the city and the stating was moved back to the old location in 1927. Porsgrunn patriots were hoping that the city would become the terminus, but instead the standard gauge track was extended to Eidanger; a critical point because it would become the transshipment point from narrow- to standard gauge.

Regular traffic started 4 December 1916, but the official opening was not until 17 December 1917, with another official opening occurring on 9 February 1920 along with sections of the Sørland Line. The branch Brevik Line was completed on 16 June 1921, while the branch line to Herøya was not completed until 1952.

=== Operations ===
Operation of the line was the responsibility of NSB, while the ownership remained in Øst-Telemark Jernbaneaktieselskap; Norsk Hydro was forced to provide a five percent dividend to NSB—money that was put into a fund to purchase Norsk Hydro's ownership at a later time. Norsk Transport retained ownership of the Rjukan Line and operated the railway ferries.

The passenger and general cargo transport on the line was not profitable, and Norsk Hydro had to subsidize this through higher fees on their freight. For NSB it was a profitable venture, as one of three lines to make profits in 1932. During the 1920s the two companies brought their disagreements to court; on 7 April 1923 the Supreme Court ruled in favor of NSB, and Norsk Hydro had to continue subsidizing operations.

In the period 1920–35, 6.1 million tonnes of cargo was transported for Norsk Hydro. During the first half of the 1930s the price of potassium nitrate fell 60%, and in 1934 Norsk Hydro announced they would move production; to compensate the state agreed to in part subsidize the transport on the railway. Still, on 6 April 1934 the plant at Notodden was closed and moved to Herøya in Porsgrunn.

The disagreement between Norsk Hydro and NSB continued through the 1930s- and 40s until an agreement was reached in 1952 as to the value of each party in the line. On 1 July 1953 NSB bought Norsk Hydro's ownership in the line; the company remained a limited company until April 1956. A new agreement for transport fees was reached, giving Norsk Hydro a quantity discount, but falling production at Rjukan made it impossible for Norsk Hydro to take advantage of the potential discount.

=== Decline ===
From the 1960s the production at Rjukan decreased steadily, and the plant was finally closed on 1 July 1991; the last freight train was run four days later. Passenger transport from Porsgrunn to Tinnoset was terminated at the end of 1990, with 260 passengers taking the final train. Trains continued to operate to Notodden; except from October 2000 to August 2001. On 25 August 2004 the northern terminus at Notodden was moved by 800 m to a more central location; the extension is now electrified and reopened on 14 December 2020.
