= Porsgrunn Station =

Railway station in Porsgrunn, Norway

Porsgrunn
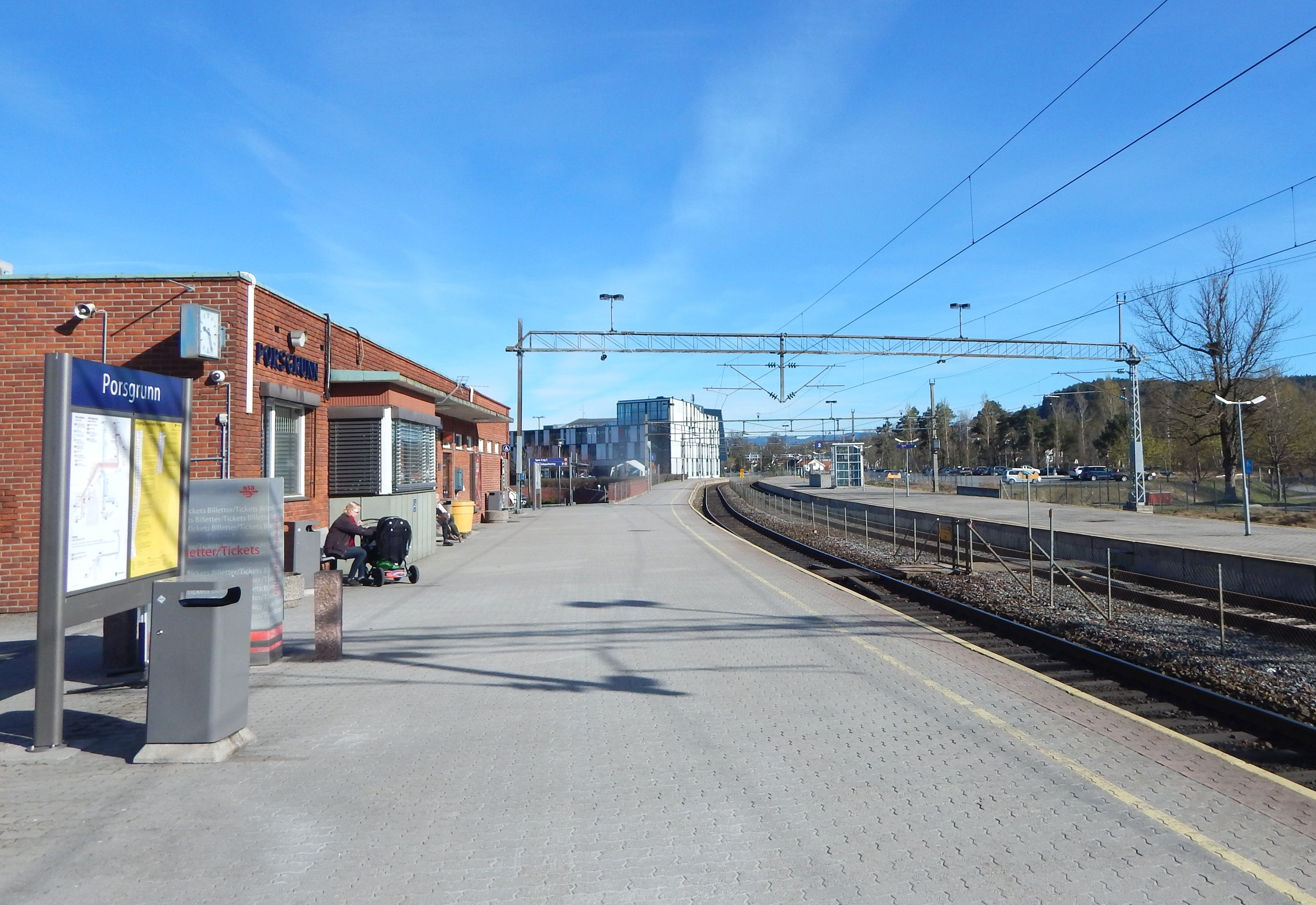

General information
- Location: Jernbanegt. 16, 3914 Porsgrunn, Porsgrunn Municipality; Norway
- Coordinates: 59°8′20.75″N 9°39′33.71″E
- Elevation: 5.7 m (19 ft) AMSL
- Owner: Bane NOR
- Operator: Vy
- Line: Vestfold Line
- Connections: Bus: Farte

Construction
- Architect: Balthazar Lange (previous building)

History
- Opened: 24 November 1882
Location

Porsgrunn Station (Norwegian: Porsgrunn stasjon) is a railway station serving the town of Porsgrunn in Porsgrunn Municipality, Norway. It serves regional trains on Vestfold Line and local trains on Bratsberg Line, all operated by Vy. The station building is located beside a bus terminal.

== History ==
A railway between Drammen Station and Larvik Station was opened in 1881. An extension from Larvik to Skien, including a station in Porsgrunn, was opened to the public on 24 November 1882 by Prime Minister Christian August Selmer and Minister of the Interior Christian Jensen. The previous day, they had ridden the line on the Royal Train and four other carriages. At Porsgrunn Station, a luncheon was arranged by the municipal council. Though King Oscar II was not present, he did receive a telegram from Porsgrunn informing of the festivities at the station. After a series of negotiations between railway companies in 1913, the new Bratsberg Line connecting Notodden to Porsgrunn opened to the public on 17 December 1917.

The original station building was drawn by either Balthazar Lange or Peter Andreas Blix. Like the other buildings on the line, it was made of wood and was similar to the buildings on the Østfold Line. A new station building was opened on 9 October 1960, but the old building remained in use for signalling control. Its demolition was planned for the following year, but this was delayed until 1962. The station became unstaffed in 2002.

| Preceding station | Regional trains | Following station |
|---|---|---|
| Skien Terminus | RE11 | Larvik towards Eidsvoll |
| Skien towards Notodden | R55 | Terminus |
