= Horten Station =

Future railway station in Horten, Norway

Horten
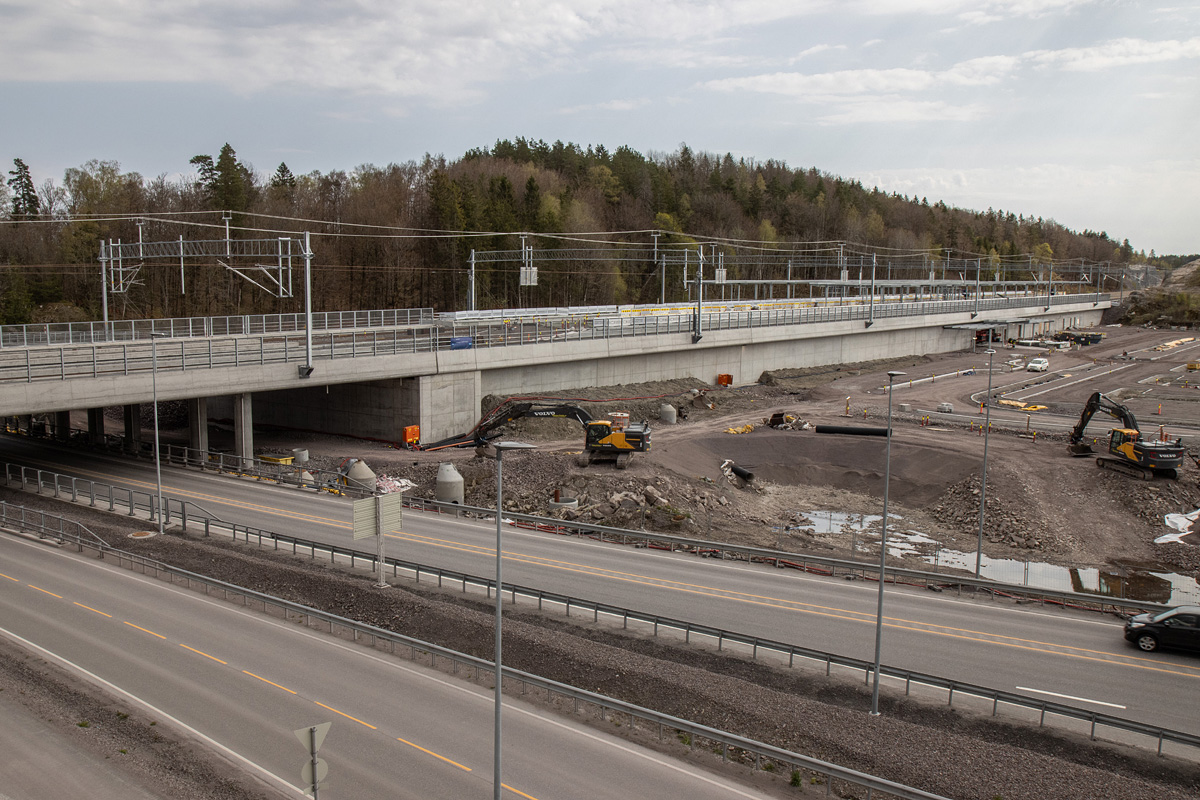
- Horten station under construction, May 2024. The station and tracks are on an elevated bridge that passes over the nearby road. Station entrance from parking lot can be seen on the right. by Øyvind Berg

General information
- Location: Skoppum, Norway
- Coordinates: 59.3758302°N 10.3943786°E
- Owner: Bane NOR
- Line: Vestfold Line

History
- Opened: Planned 2025
Location

Horten Station is a railway station under construction on the Vestfold Line in Horten Municipality in Vestfold county, Norway.

== Background ==
The planned opening is in 2025, along with the new double-tracked railway line from Nykirke to Barkåker. It lies about a kilometer to the south-west of Skoppum Station, which it replaces, and directly by the main road National Road 19 which connects E18 to E6 via the Moss–Horten Ferry.

Several possible names were discussed but in 2020, Bane NOR decided that the new name would be «Horten stasjon», supporting the municipality's wishes. The former Horten Station was located in the center of Horten town, while both Skoppum Station and the new station are located about 8 km west, in the village of Skoppum, but within the same municipality.

The new station will get a park and ride with up to 600 parking spots, a bicycle parking station and two waiting areas with heating.

The Norwegian Railway Directorate has planned to have four trains per hour on the Vestfold line in the future. Two of these are to be express trains to and from Sandefjord and/or Tønsberg, and will bypass the stations in Horten, Holmestrand and Sande, from December 2025. This has been controversial. Horten Station is planned to only be serviced by trains with end stations in Tønsberg and Oslo, with no direct trains to Oslo Airport, Gardermoen or Sandefjord Airport, Torp. The decision was based on statistics showing that 80 percent of travellers to and from Oslo on the Vestfold line use stations south of Horten.
