= Holmestrand Station (1881–2016) =

Former railway station in Holmestrand, Norway

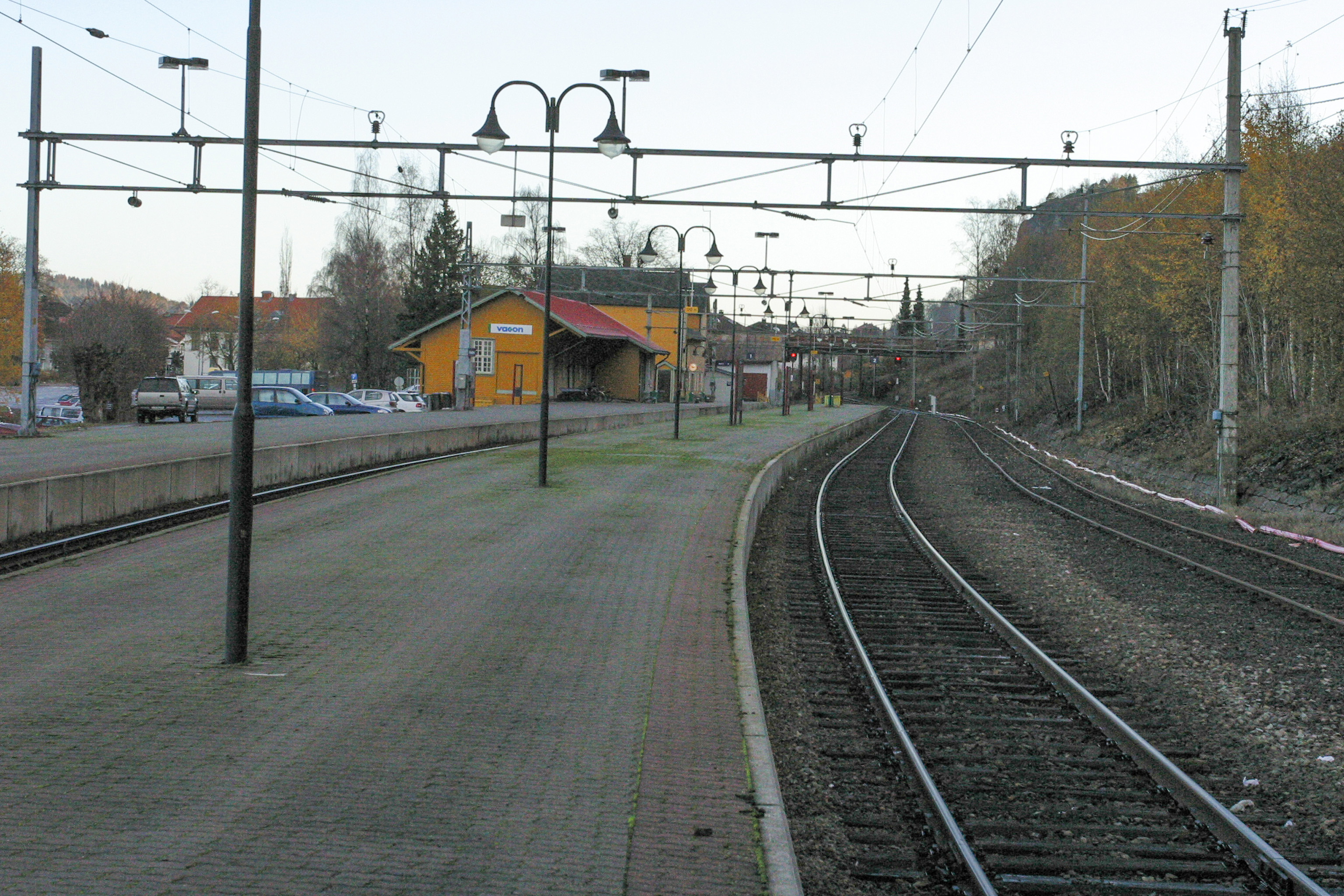

General information
- Location: Holmestrand, Holmestrand Municipality; Norway
- Coordinates: 59°29′34″N 10°18′41″E
- Elevation: 4.8 m (16 ft)
- Line: Vestfold Line
- Distance: 86.09 km (53.49 mi)
- Platforms: 2
- Connections: Bus: Vestviken Kollektivtrafikk

Construction
- Architect: Balthazar Lange

History
- Opened: 1881
- Closed: 2016
Location

Holmestrand Station (Norwegian: Holmestrand stasjon) was a railway station on the Vestfold Line located in the town of Holmestrand in Holmestrand Municipality in Vestfold county, Norway.

The station was opened in 1881 with the opening of the railway line. It is located 86.09 km (53.49 mi) from Oslo Central Station. The station is at an altitude of 4.8 meters (16 ft) above mean sea level. In October 2016 the station was closed to prepare the opening of the new Holmestrand Station.

== History ==
The station was built as a third-class station. The original floor plan consisted of a station master's office, three other offices, a ticket office, an express cargo expedition, a waiting room and a restaurant on the ground floor. The upper story consisted of a station master's apartment, with four rooms, a kitchen and a maid's room. The station complex further consisted of a cargo house, a water tower and two sheds, a smithy and warehouse for the track division. All the machines were run via a belts from a central engine. Water was supplied from a basin at the top of Holmestrandsfjellet.

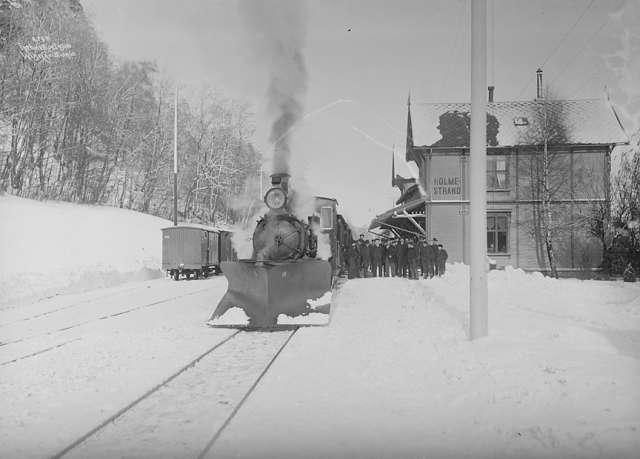
The station in 1906

The station was staffed by a station master, three telegraphists, three station workers, a cargo clerk and a foreman. The station originally had three tracks, later increased to four to handle a commuter train between Holmestrand and Drammen. In addition there was a spur for loading cargo. The station was at the time also connected via a branch to the port, which again connected to the Holmestrand–Vittingfoss Line.

Holmestrand Station originally had large cargo customers in Nordisk Aluminiumsindustry, later Høyang, and Holmestrand Dampsag. All of these accessed the station via HVB tracks. As production was reduced, so did the freight through the station. After Linjegods took over break bulk cargo, cargo handling at Holmestrand was terminated.

== Facilities ==
Holmestrand Station is located just outside the town center, close to Holmestrand Bad. The station is located on the Vestfold Line, at milestone 86.09 kilometers (53.49 mi) from Oslo and at an elevation of 4.8 meters (16 ft) above mean sea level.

== Service ==
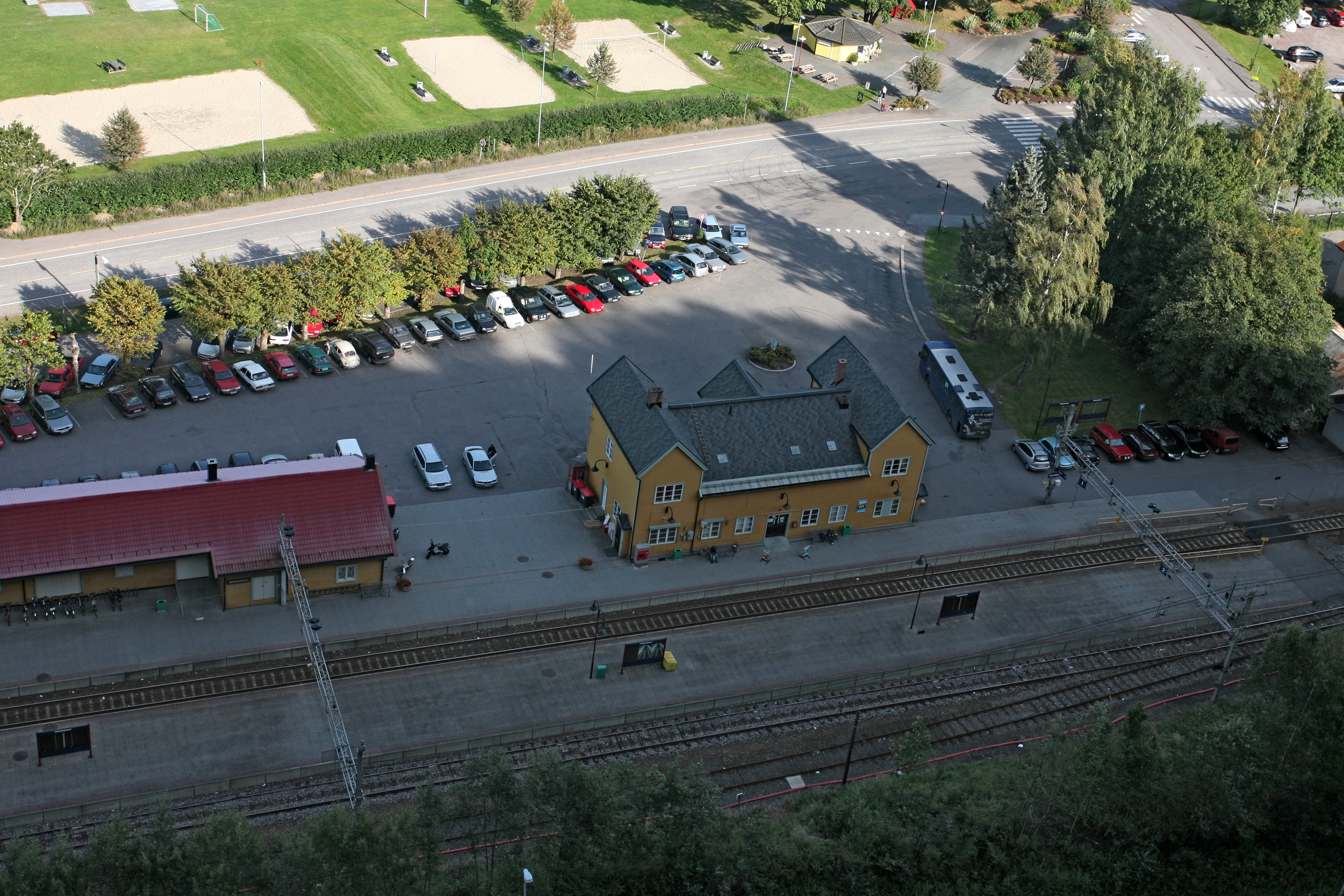
Overview of the station

As well as serving Holmestrand, the station has become the primary choice for commuters in Horten who prefer this station to Skoppum Station. Although Skoppum is closer to Horten, the road access to Holmestrand is vastly superior.

Preceding station		Following station
Skoppum	Vestfold Line	Sande
