= Horten Line =

Former railway line in Norway

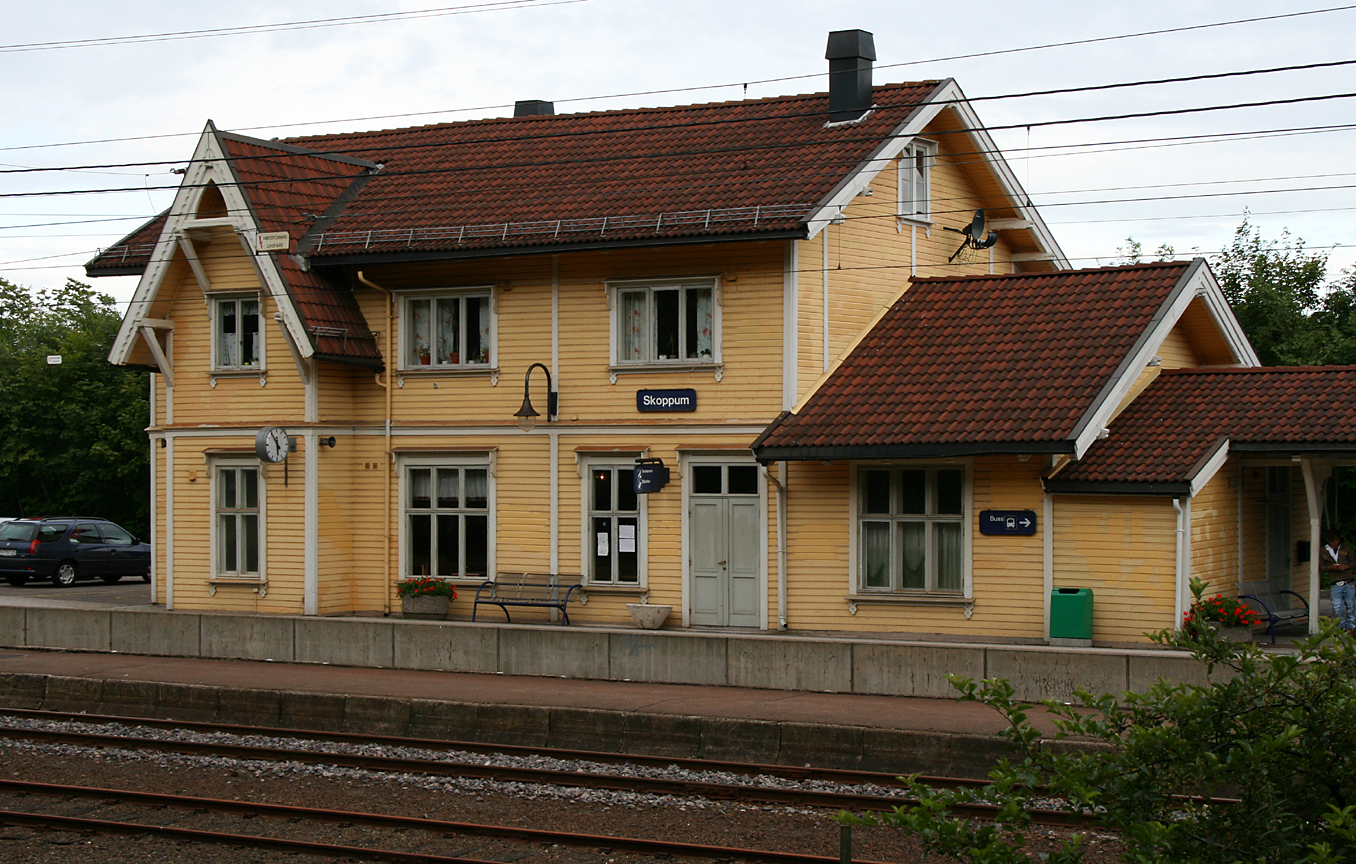
- Skoppum Station was the terminus of the Horten Line, where it met the Vestfold Line

Overview
- Native name: Hortenlinjen
- Status: Demolished
- Owner: Norwegian National Rail Administration
- Termini: Skoppum Station; Horten Station (1881)
- Stations: 7

Service
- Type: Railway
- System: Norwegian railway

History
- Opened: 13 October 1881
- Closed: 2002

Technical
- Line length: 7.0 km (4.3 mi)
- Number of tracks: Single
- Track gauge: 1,435 mm (4 ft 8 1/2 in)
- Electrification: 15 kV 16.7 Hz AC
- Highest elevation: 39.0 m (128 ft)

The Horten Line (Norwegian: Hortenlinjen) was a 7.0-kilometer (4.3 mi) branch railway line of the Vestfold Line which ran from Skoppum to Horten, Norway. The line opened as a narrow gauge line on 13 October 1881, the same day as the Vestfold Line. The latter had been proposed to run through Horten, but instead a branch line was chosen. The Horten Line converted to standard gauge in 1949 and electrified in 1957. Passenger transport ran until 1968 and freight trains until 2002. The line was demolished in 2009 and converted into a combined walking and bicycle path. Skoppum Station and Borre Station have both been preserved as examples of Balthazar Lange's Swiss chalet style architecture.

== Route ==
The Horten Line was a branch of the Vestfold Line which ran 7.0 kilometers (4.3 mi) from Skoppum Station to the prior Horten Station. The route was entirely located within the current municipality of Horten. The line was since 1949 standard gauge and from 1957 electrified at 15 kV 16.7 Hz AC. The line had seven stations, of which three were originally manned stations with passing loops. The line has a continual gradient down from Skoppum Station, which reaches a maximum of 1.88 percent.

Skoppum Station is located 99.54 kilometers (61.85 mi) from Oslo West Station at an elevation of 39.0 meters (128 ft) above mean sea level (AMSL). It passed Vestre Sande Station after 1.68 kilometers (1.04 mi) before reaching Borre Station, located 3.53 kilometers (2.19 mi) from Skoppum and at 25.9 meters (85 ft) AMSL. It continued past three more halts, Langgrunn, Rørestrand and Steinsnes, before reaching (the prior) Horten Station, located at 2.2 meters (7 ft 3 in) AMSL. In Horten there was a branch to the port.

== History ==
=== Planning and construction ===
Public opinion started debating the need for a railway through Vestfold in the late 1860s The parliamentarians from Jarlsberg and Larvik County (renamed Vestfold in 1919) appealed to the government in 1869 for the construction of a railway through Vestfold south from Drammen to Larvik and onwards to Langefjorden. The request was positively accepted by the government, who instructed the railway director to carry out surveys through Vestfold. The country experienced an economic boom starting in 1871, with demands throughout the country for railways to be built. Official planning of a railway through Vestfold to Brevik commenced with a royal resolution on 24 July 1871.

There were a multitude of proposals for where the railway should run. The only points of agreement were that the line should run through Tønsberg, Sandefjord and Larvik, and the line between the three towns was the least controversial. North of Tønsberg there was more disunity. One proposal was to run the railway from Vestfossen Station on the Kongsberg Line along the east shore of Eikeren and down to Tønsberg along a route similar to that which the Tønsberg–Eidsfoss Line would later follow. A branch line would then be built to Horten. Alternatively a passage through Sande was proposed, although fourteen different routes were proposed. Three main ones were the inner, outer and combined coastal alternatives. The outer followed the shore of the Oslofjord, would be 111 kilometers (69 mi) and would run through Holmestrand, Horten and Åsgårdstrand before reaching Tønsberg. The combined and inner would be 107 and 102 kilometers (66 and 63 mi), respectively, and both involved building a branch line to Horten. The main argument against the coastal route was that the towns already had a good steamship service, with several daily departures. A third major alternative was to bypass the coast altogether and build down the valley of Lågendalen to Larvik.

Shares for various routes were issued in 1873, and the coastal alternative proved to be the most popular. Still, the county politicians preferred an interior route when it applied for the government to build the line. By 1874 the state railway commission had considered the line and had concluded that it should be built with narrow gauge. Only its chair, Professor Broch, voted in favor of standard gauge. The advantage of 3 ft 6 in (1,067 mm) narrow gauge was that it would cut construction costs by a third. The construction of the line was considered by Parliament in 1875. A political deal was struck, where representatives from the Vestfold area agreed to support the Voss Line while representatives from Hordaland supported the Jarlsberg Line. The decision, taken on 8 June 1875, was made with 76 against 36 votes, and supported the compromise coastal route with an extension to Skien.

Construction of the Jarlsberg and Horten Lines commenced in 1876. Because King Oscar II happened to be touring Norway in October 1881, the railway between Drammen and Larvik was officially opened by him on 13 October 1881, including the branch to Horten. However, the construction was not completed and the line did not actually start operations until late December.

=== Operational history ===
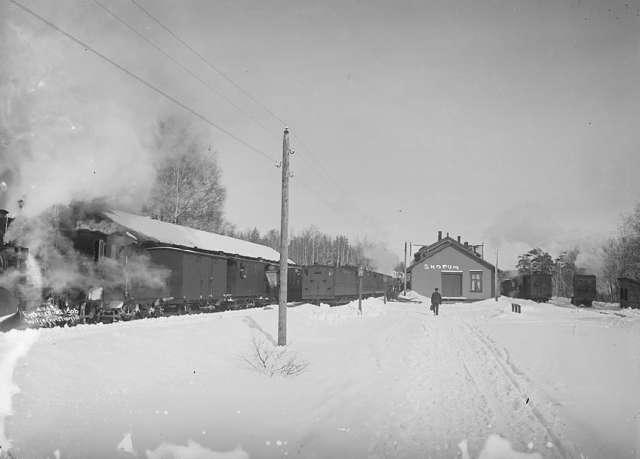
Skoppum Station in 1906

Initially the line had four trains per direction per day, increasing to seven in 1884. It reached eleven during the 1920s and peaked with thirteen from 1946. Travel time was initially 16 minutes between Skoppum and Horten. The Horten Line was served with the same rolling stock as the Vestfold Line. This included steam locomotives including the Class V, Class XIII and Class XXIII. From 1930 four Bmc Class 1 gasoline multiple units were delivered to the Vestfold Line, and these were frequently used on the Horten Line. A used gasoline multiple unit was taken over from the Tønsberg–Eidsfoss Line when it closed in 1938, and a Cmbo Class 1 from the Flekkefjord Line when it was gauge converted in 1944.

The line's patronage peaked in the 1920, when ca. 200,000 annual passengers were transported along with between 5,000 and 15,000 tonnes of cargo. Originally the line only had three stations: Skoppum, Borre and Horten. Vestre Sande and Rørestrand opened on 1 July 1929, although the latter was closed on 17 June the following year. Instead Steinenes was opened on 25 June. Langgrunn opened on 23 June 1941.

Though their bus division, NSB Biltrafikk, the railway company operated both bus and train services between Skoppum and Horten from the mid-1940s. Planning of conversion to standard gauge commenced in 1910, but steady delays caused the Vestfold Line to remain the last narrow-gauge mainline railway by 1945. The gauge conversion was carried out simultaneously on the Horten and Vestfold Lines, and the new gauge was taken into use on 3 October 1949. With the gauge conversion the number of daily services to eight. Electrification of the Vestfold Line was carried out in 1957, and the Horten Line became the last segment to receive electric traction, on 11 December 1957. With the electrification the passenger trains were operated using Class 65 electric multiple units, while freight trains were hauled using primarily El 2 locomotives, supplemented with El 1 and El 10.

=== Closing ===
NSB gradually increased its focus on bus traffic on the route, reducing the number of train services to five from 1962. NSB decided that it was cheaper to operate all services by bus, and closed down all passenger services on the Horten Line from 26 May 1967. A modest amount of freight traffic was retained. From 1992 to 1994 National Road 19 was rebuilt along the route, which forced the overhead lines along part of the line to be taken down. Electric traction resumed in 1994. All traffic terminated in 2002 and the line was demolished in 2009.

== Architecture ==
Balthazar Lange was selected as the Vestfold and Horten Lines main architect. He worked on the various plans from late 1879 until July 1882, when he retired as a railway architect. The stations were designed in Swiss chalet style. Skoppum Station was given an island platform design, with the station located between the two tracks. This, and the need for space for transshipment, gave the station an odd design, and the island location gave it difficult access from the surroundings. Skoppum and Borre Stations have been preserved and are listed as a heritage site by the Directorate for Cultural Heritage. Horten Station has been demolished and a new Horten Station is planned to open in 2025.
