= Horten Station (1881) =

Railway station in Horten, Norway

Horten
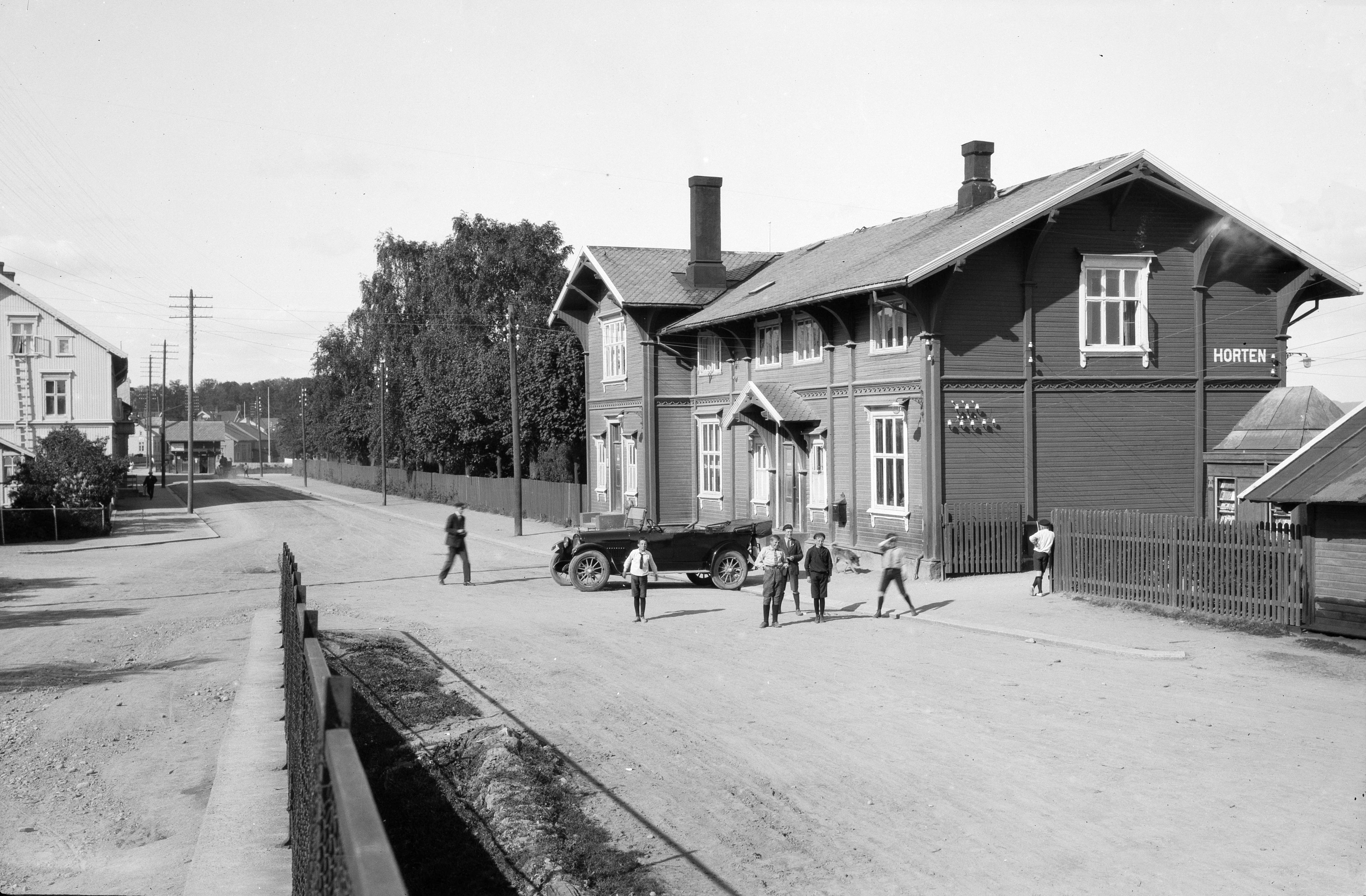

General information
- Location: Horten, Norway
- Coordinates: 59.4041°N 10.4815°E
- Elevation: 2.2 m (7 ft)
- Owner: Norwegian State Railways
- Line: Horten Line
- Distance: 106.51 km (66.18 mi)

Construction
- Architect: Balthazar Lange

History
- Opened: 7 December 1881
- Closed: 28 May 1967
- Electrified: 11 December 1957
Location

Horten Station (Norwegian: Horten stasjon) is a former railway station in Horten, Norway, which was the terminus of the Horten Line and in use between 1881 and 1967. The station was designed in Swiss chalet style by Balthazar Lange and was wedged between the town and the Oslofjord. It was located 106.51 kilometers (66.18 mi) from Oslo.

When the Vestfold Line was being planned, some plans called for it to run via Horten. Instead, a more inland route was chosen and a 7.0-kilometer (4.3 mi) branch line was built to the town. Traffic peaked in the 1920s, when ca. 200,000 people traveled on the line, and the station saw a peak thirteen daily services during the 1940. The line past the station was converted to standard gauge in 1949 and electrified in 1957. By then the Norwegian State Railways (NSB) had started to run a bus service to Skoppum Station and gradually reduced service to Horten. From 1967 all passenger traffic was terminated. The station building was demolished in 1973.

== History ==
There were a large number of proposals for which route the Vestfold Line should follow, while it was being planned during the late 1860s and early 1870s. The main two proposals were an interior route and a coastal route. The latter had three sub-proposals, two of which ran west of Horten and one which ran through the town. Horten was regarded as a sufficiently important settlement that all alternatives which did not run through it called for a branch line to reach Horten. Part of the reason for the towns importance was that it hosted Karljohansvern, the main base of the Royal Norwegian Navy.

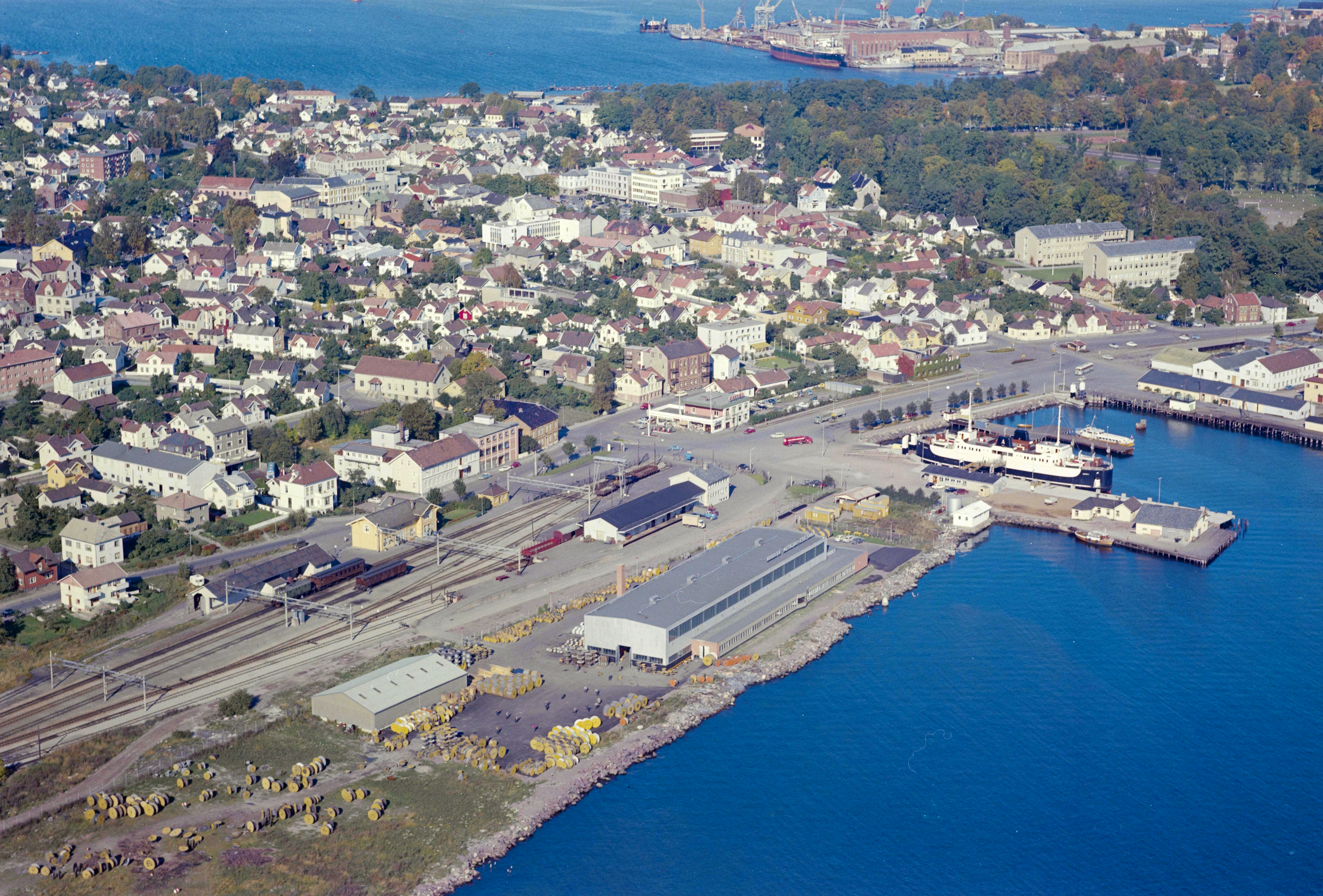
Horten station and downtown on 30 September 1964

The route issue was not settled until Parliament chose the "compromise coastal alternative" on 8 June 1875, in which the Vestfold Line bypassed Horten, but a branch was to be built from Skoppum. The station was officially opened on 13 October 1881, although regular traffic did not start until 7 December. The line was originally built with narrow gauge (3 ft 6 in (1,067 mm)) and the line and station were converted to standard gauge on 3 October 1949, as the last section to be converted in Norway. The line was electrified on 11 December 1957. NSB decided that it was cheaper to operate all services by bus, and closed down all passenger services on the Horten Line from 26 May 1967. A modest amount of freight traffic was retained.

== Service ==
Initially the line had four trains per direction per day, increasing to seven in 1884. It reached eleven during the 1920s and peaked with thirteen from 1946. Travel time was initially 16 minutes between Skoppum and Horten. The line's patronage peaked in the 1920, when ca. 200,000 annual passengers were transported along with between 5,000 and 15,000 tonnes of cargo. Though their bus division, NSB Biltrafikk, the railway company operated both bus and train services between Skoppum and Horten from the mid-1940s. With the gauge conversion in 1949, the number of daily services to eight. NSB gradually increased its focus on bus traffic on the route, reducing the number of train services to five from 1962.

== Facilities ==
The station building was designed by Balthazar Lange, who had the responsibility for designing all the stations along the Vestfold and Horten Line. Designed in Swiss chalet style, Horten was among the larger station in Vestfold, as it among other duties had to act as a port of entry. It is physically placed between the town and the fjord, originally on a parcel of land so small that it could only house two through tracks and two spurs. As time went the fjord was gradually filled, allowing the station room to expand. In the first decades up to twenty people worked at the station.

Horten Station was located 7.0 kilometers (4.3 mi) from Skoppum Station on the Vestfold Line, and 106.51 kilometers (66.18 mi) from Oslo West Station. It was located at an elevation of 2.2 meters (7 ft 3 in) above mean sea level. In addition to the station area, it had a short branch to the port. Horten Station has burned down.

Preceding station		Following station
Steinsnes	Horten Line	Terminus
