= Skoppum =

Village in Horten, Norway

- Village
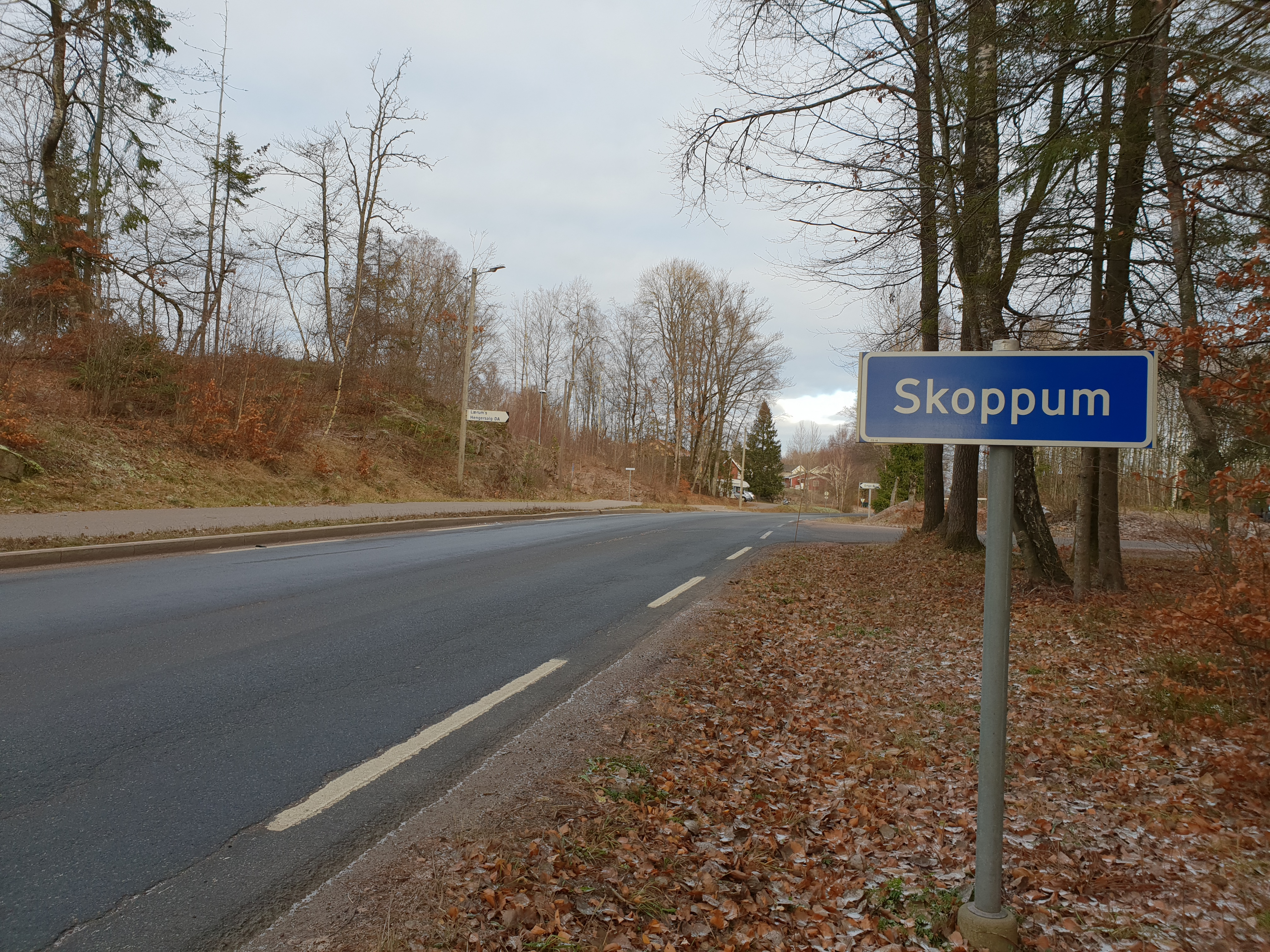
- View of the entrance into the village
- Interactive map of Skoppum
- Coordinates: 59.38613°N 10.41077°E
- Country: Norway
- Region: Eastern Norway
- County: Vestfold
- District: Jarlsberg
- Municipality: Horten Municipality

Area
  - Total: 1.36 km^{2} (0.53 sq mi)
- Elevation: 39 m (128 ft)

Population (2026)
  - Total: 1,736
  - Density: 1,276/km^{2} (3,300/sq mi)
- Time zone: UTC+01:00 (CET)
  - Summer (DST): UTC+02:00 (CEST)
- Post Code: 3185 Skoppum

Skoppum is a village in Horten Municipality in Vestfold county, Norway. The village is located about 5 kilometres (3.1 mi) to the southwest of the town of Horten, about 3 kilometres (1.9 mi) to the west of the village of Borre, about 5.5 kilometres (3.4 mi) to the northwest of the town of Åsgårdstrand, about 4 kilometres (2.5 mi) south of the village of Nykirke, and about 8 kilometres (5.0 mi) to the east of the village of Revetal (in Tønsberg Municipality).

The 1.36-square-kilometre (340-acre) village has a population (2026) of 1,736 and a population density of 1,276 inhabitants per square kilometre (3,300/sq mi).

Skoppum Station is located in the village. It located along the Vestfoldsbanen railway line and was the sole remaining railway station in Horten Municipality until construction began on the new Horten Station about 1 kilometre (0.62 mi) to the southwest. The station was the site where the old Hortensbanen railway line used to branch off and head into the town of Horten (the Horten line was closed in 1967). Skoppum Church is located in the village.

Skoppum houses several high-tech companies, such as Memscap, Safran and poLight.
