= Skoppum Church =

Church in Vestfold, Norway

- Skoppum kirke
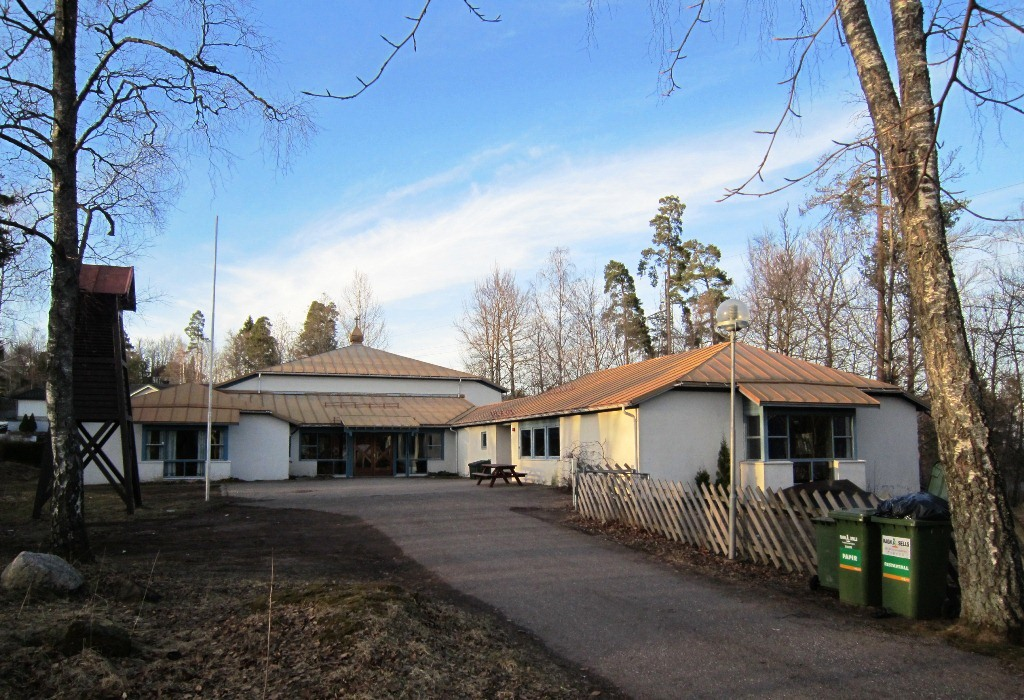
- View of the church
- Skoppum Church
- 59°23′12″N 10°24′22″E
- Location: Horten Municipality, Vestfold
- Country: Norway
- Denomination: Church of Norway
- Churchmanship: Evangelical Lutheran

History
- Status: Parish church
- Founded: 1989
- Consecrated: 1989

Architecture
- Functional status: Active
- Architect: R. Korneliussen
- Architectural type: Long church
- Completed: 1989 (37 years ago)

Specifications
- Capacity: 200
- Materials: Concrete

Administration
- Diocese: Tunsberg
- Deanery: Nord-Jarlsberg prosti
- Parish: Borre

Skoppum Church (Norwegian: Skoppum kirke) is a parish church of the Church of Norway in Horten Municipality in Vestfold county, Norway. It is located in the village of Skoppum. It is one of the churches for the Borre parish which is part of the Nord-Jarlsberg prosti (deanery) in the Diocese of Tunsberg. The white, concrete church was built in a long church design in 1989 using plans drawn up by the architect R. Korneliussen. The church seats about 200 people.

== History ==
In the 1980s, it was decided to build a church in Skoppum. After the planning was completed, the foundation stone was laid in May 1988. The new church was consecrated a year later. It was designed by the architectural company "Korneliussen, Elvestad og Ose" from Horten. In addition to the main nave, the building complex contains a church hall, nursery, youth hall, scout room, and an office.

== See also ==
- List of churches in Tunsberg
