= Holmestrand Station =

Railway station in Holmestrand, Norway

Holmestrand
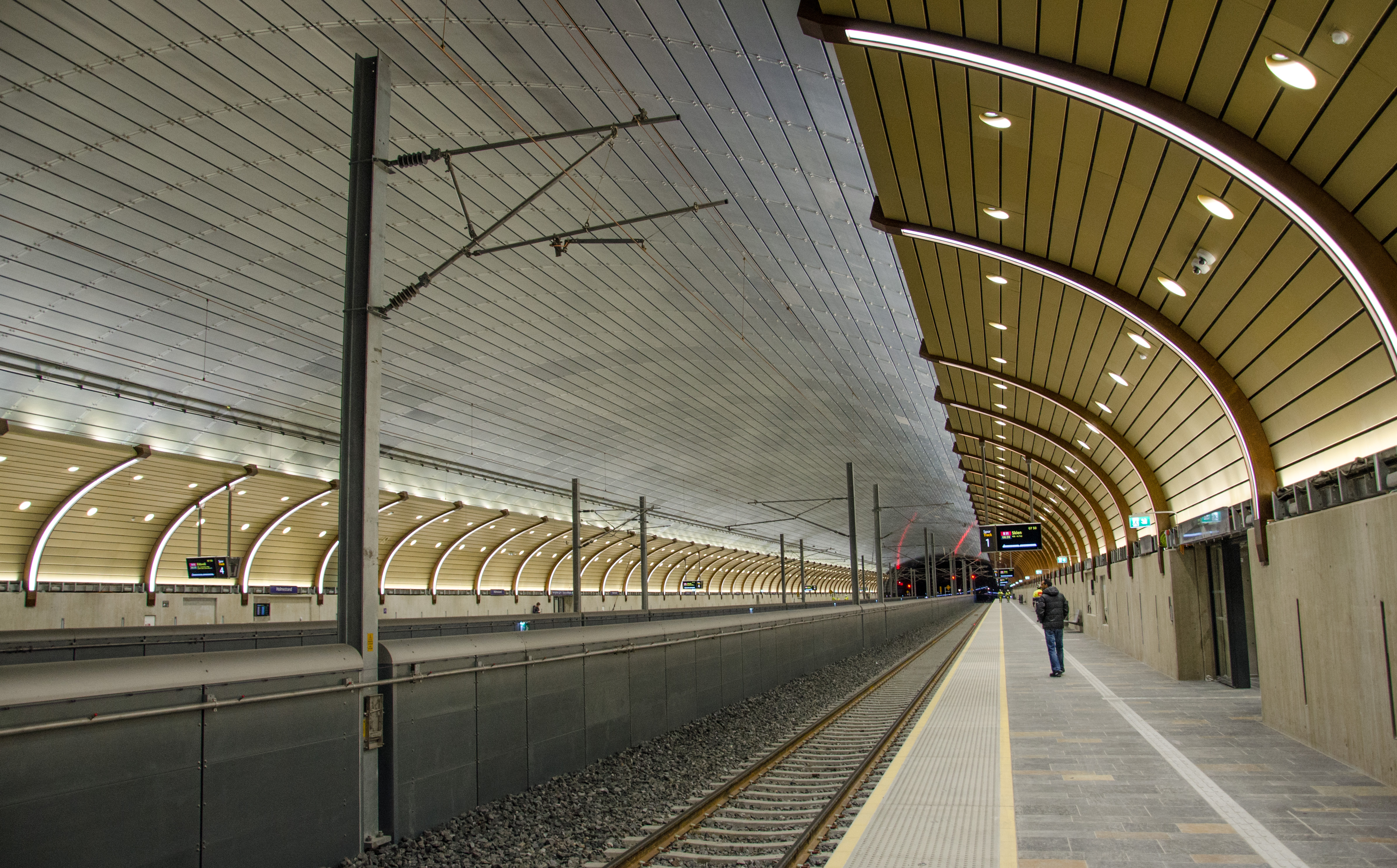
- Holmestrand Station

General information
- Location: Norway
- Owner: Bane NOR
- Operator: Vy
- Tracks: 2
Location

The new Holmestrand Station is a railway station on the Vestfold Line located in the town of Holmestrand in Vestfold, Norway, that opened for traffic on 28 November 2016. It is located inside the Holmestrandsporten tunnel.

In October 2016, the old station named Holmestrand was closed to prepare for the opening of the new one. On 28 November 2016, the new Holmestrand station opened. This is placed inside the mountain Holmestrandfjellet. Creating the 130 000 cubic meters mountain hall was a six-year undertaking for Jernbaneverket, along with partners like the architect and subconsultant Gottlieb Paludan Architects. Ramboll handled detailed planning, zoning plan, building plan and design.

== Picture gallery ==
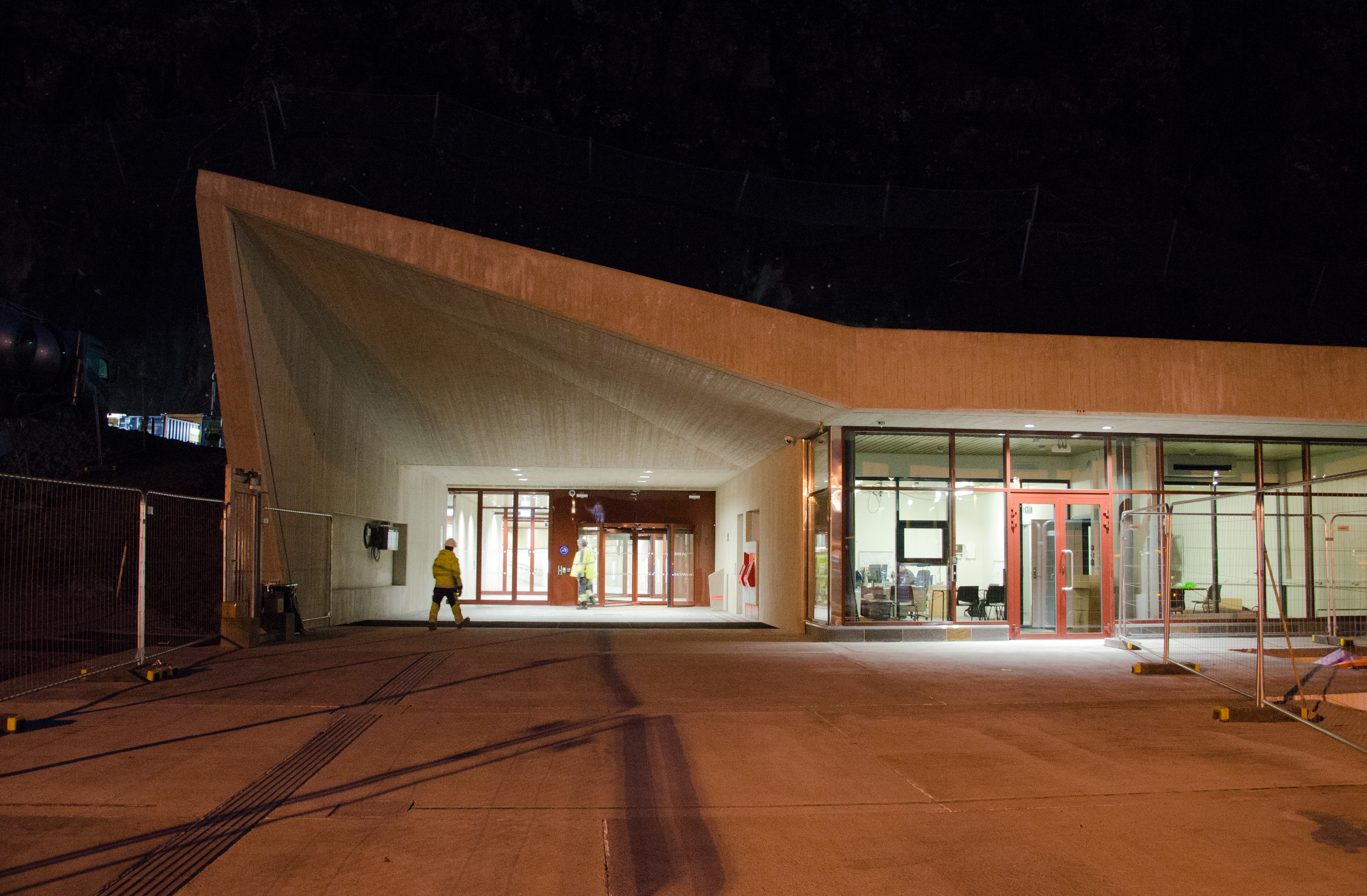
Entrance to the new station

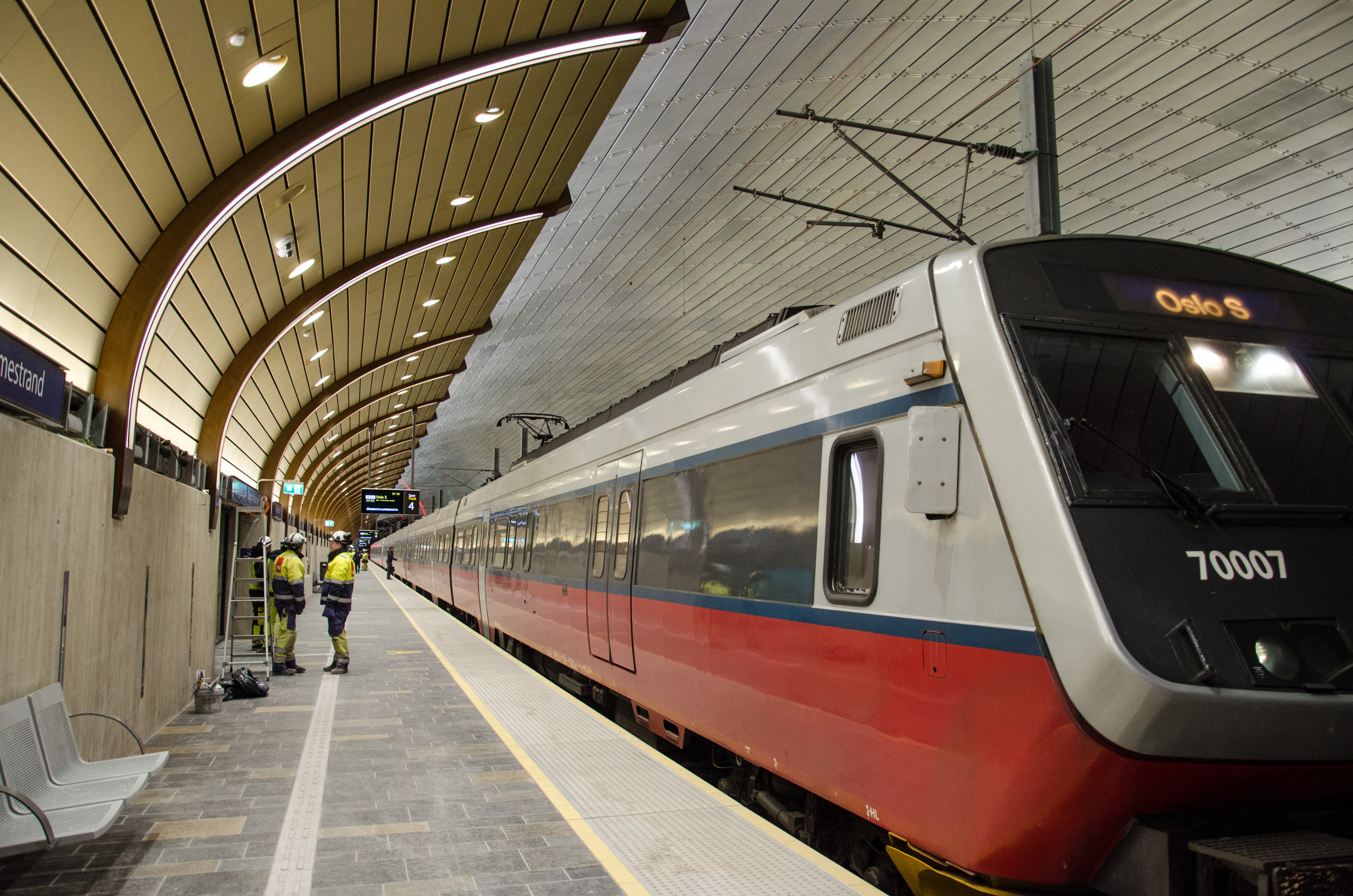
Train in the station

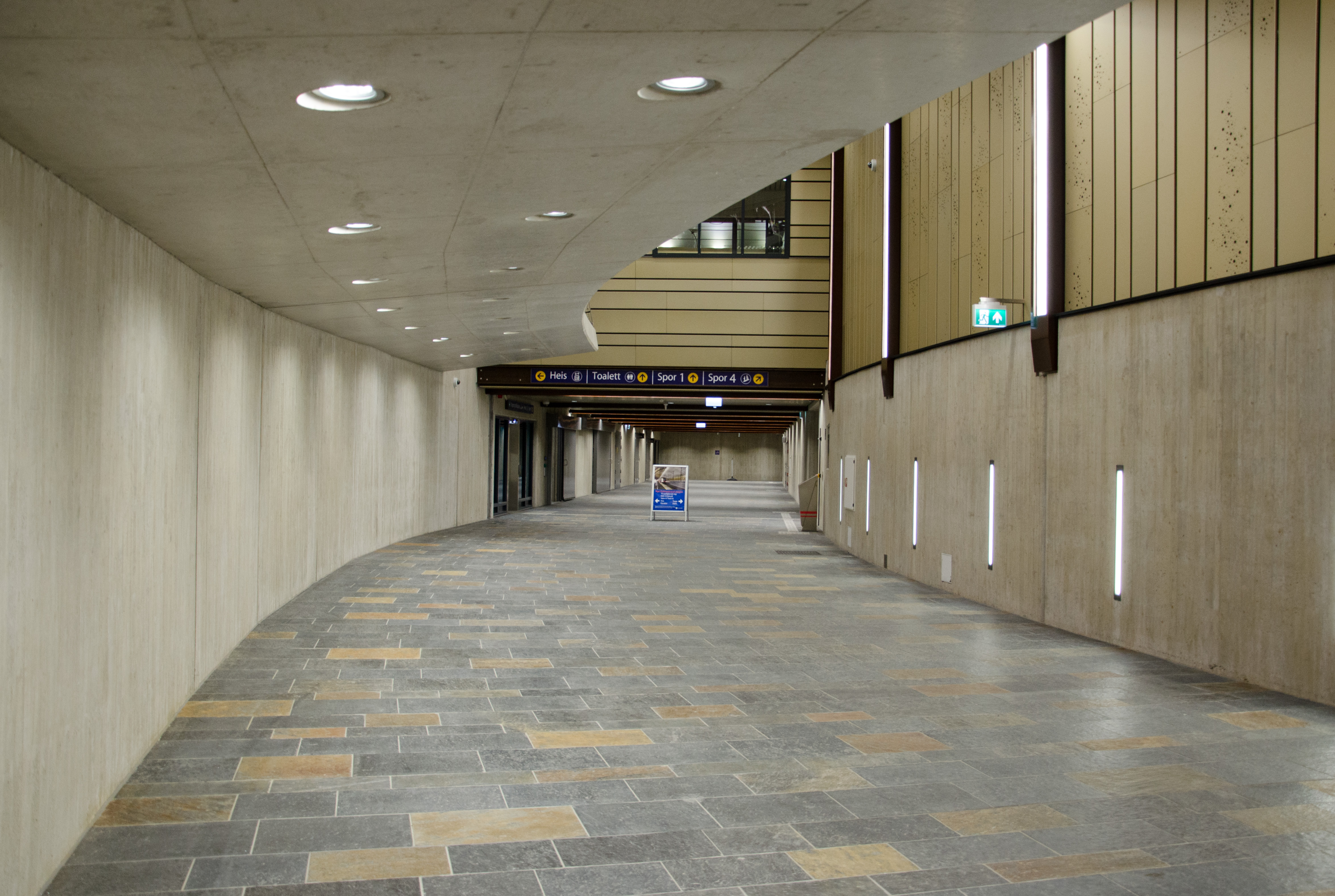
Pedestrians path in the station

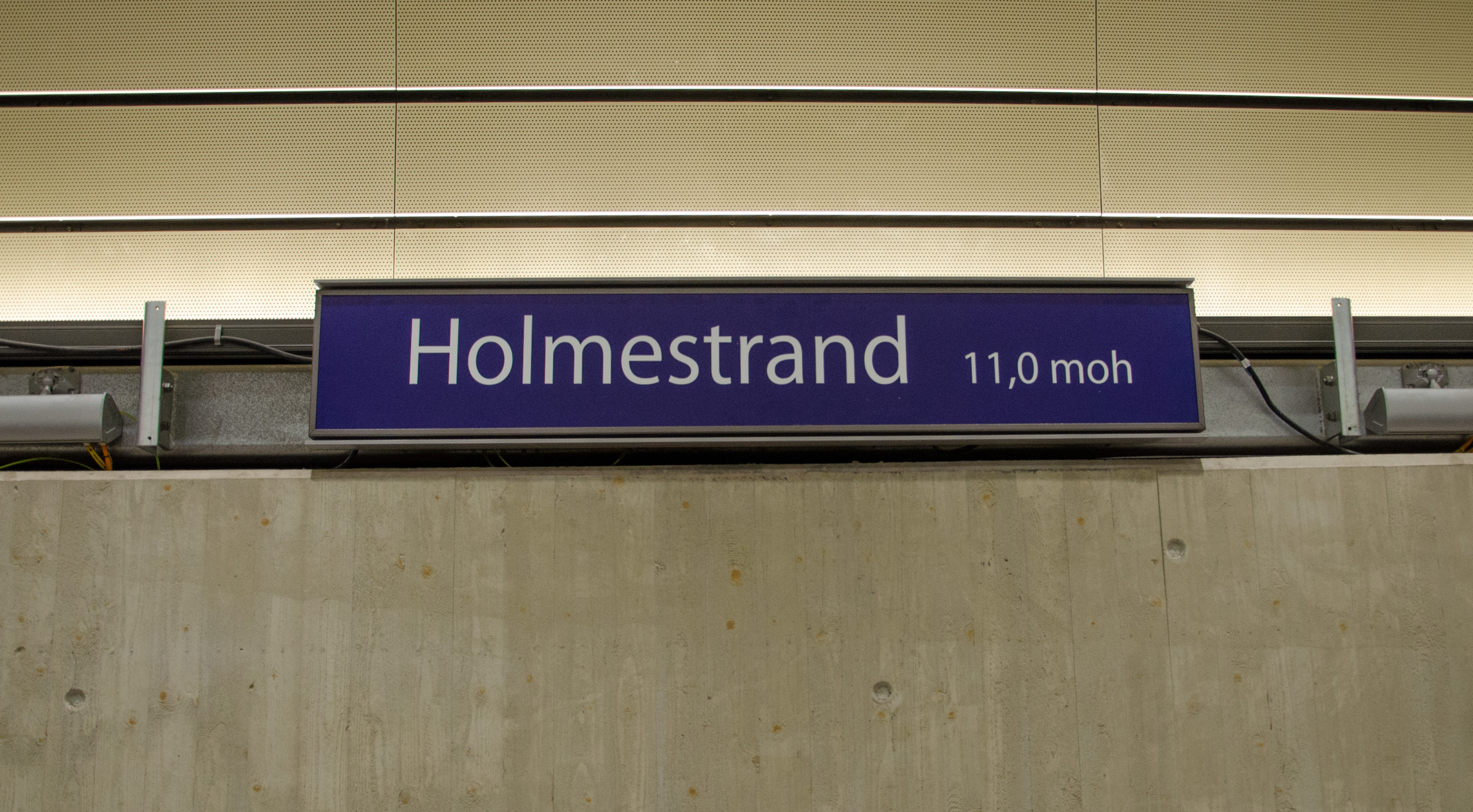
Info sign in the station

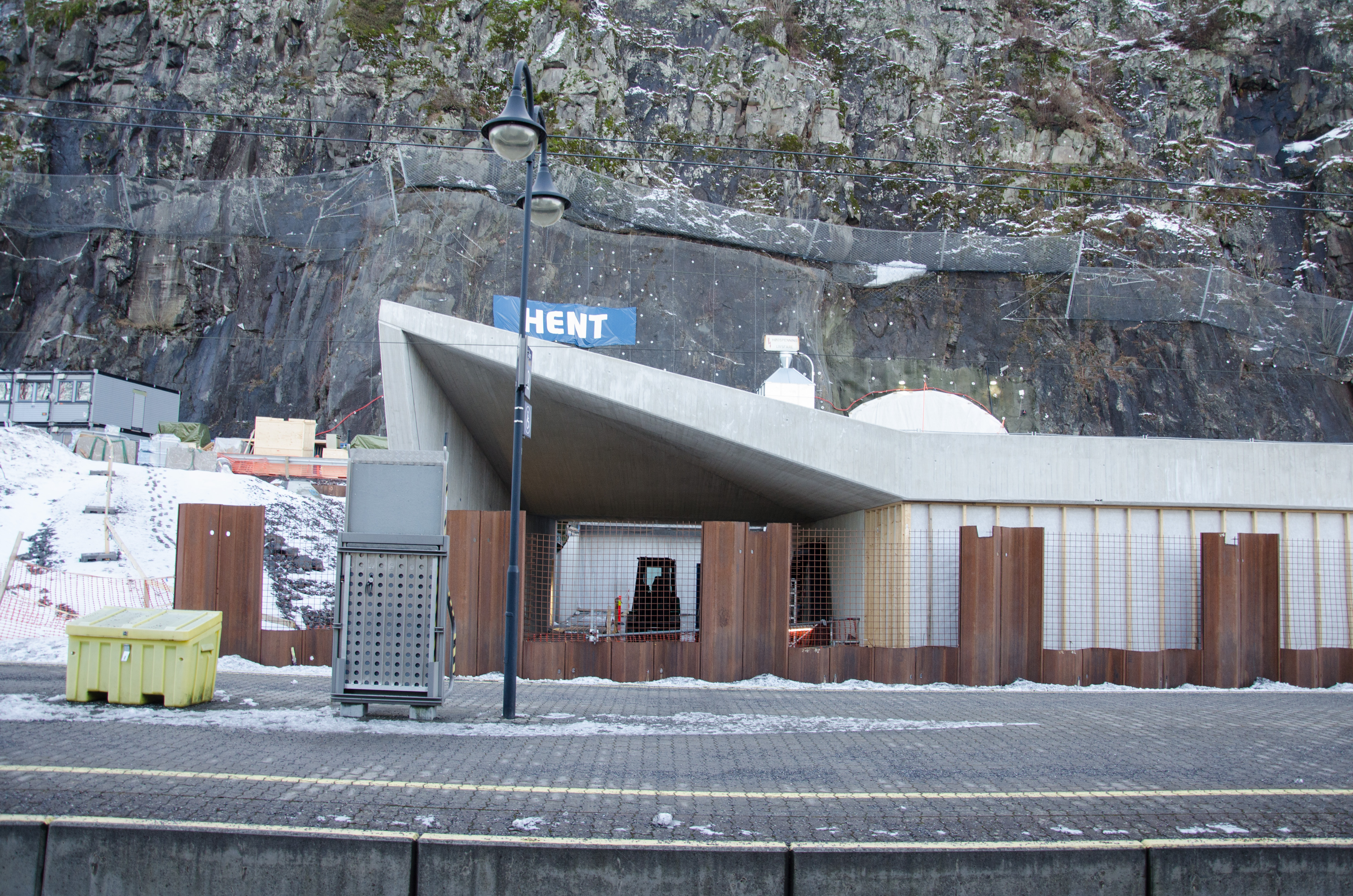
Holmestrand station during construction, February 2016

Preceding station			Following station
Skoppum	Vestfold Line		Sande
Preceding station	Regional trains		Following station
Skoppum	RE11	Skien–Oslo S–Eidsvoll	Sande
