= Skoppum Station =

Railway station in Horten, Norway

Skoppum
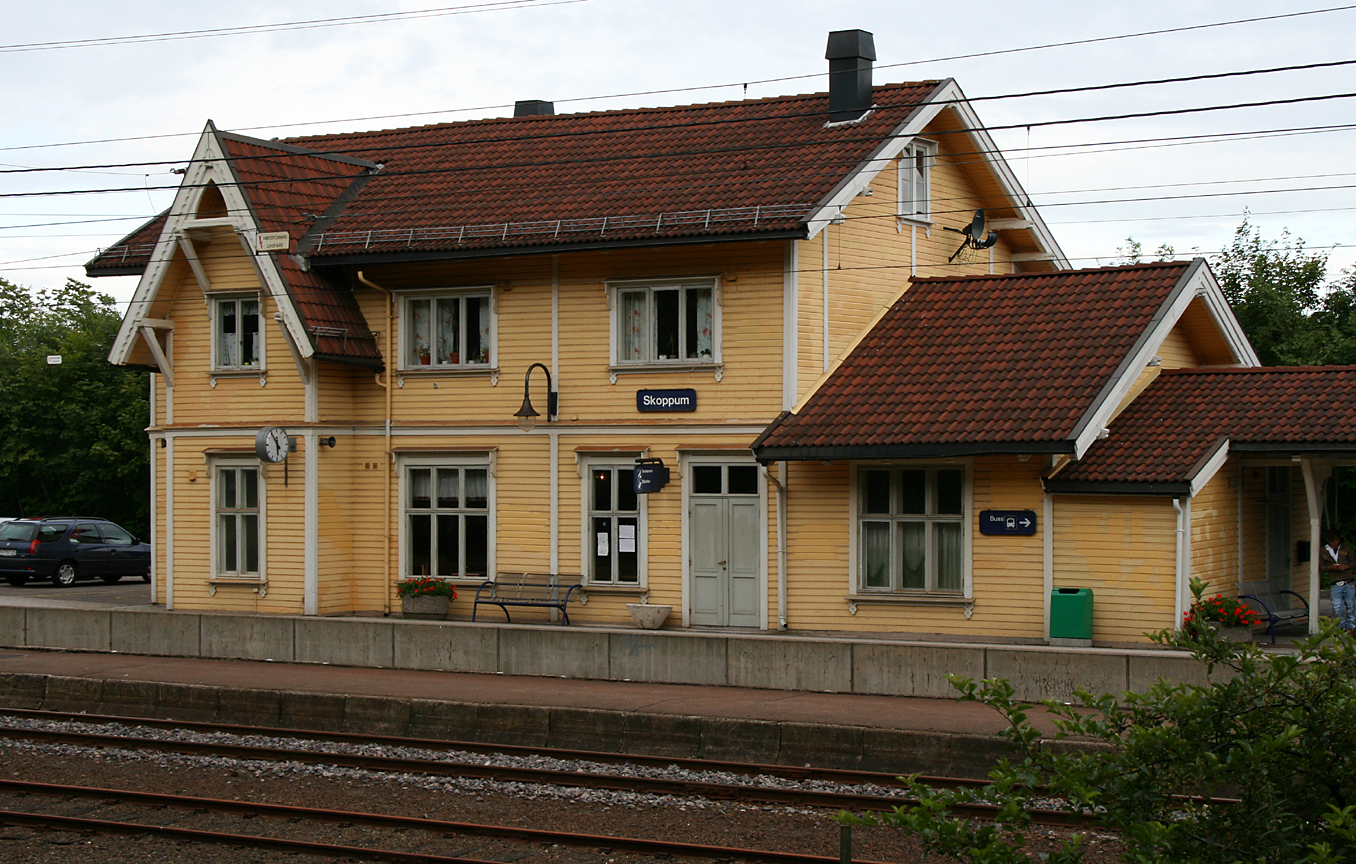

General information
- Location: Skoppum, Horten Municipality; Norway
- Coordinates: 59°23′28″N 10°24′40″E
- Elevation: 39.0 m (128.0 ft)
- Owner: Bane NOR
- Operator: Vy
- Lines: Vestfold Line; Horten Line (demolished)
- Distance: 99.54 km (61.85 mi)
- Platforms: 2
- Connections: Bus: VKT

Construction
- Architect: Balthazar Lange

History
- Opened: 7 December 1881
Location

Skoppum Station (Norwegian: Skoppum stasjon) is a railway station on the Vestfold Line in the village of Skoppum in Horten Municipality, Norway. Situated 99.54 kilometers (61.85 mi) from Oslo Central Station, it serves an hourly regional service operated by Vy. The station has two platforms and is itself located on an island platform, giving Skoppum a keilbahnhof design. The station building was designed by Balthazar Lange in Swiss chalet style.

The station opened on 7 December 1881 and served as an interchange station between the Vestfold Line and the Horten Line. The latter was closed for passenger traffic in 1967 and demolished in 2009. Skoppum remains the only station serving Horten, despite being 7 kilometers (4.3 mi) west of the town center. The current station is listed as a heritage site, but will be abandoned in 2025 when the new Horten Station opens.

== History ==
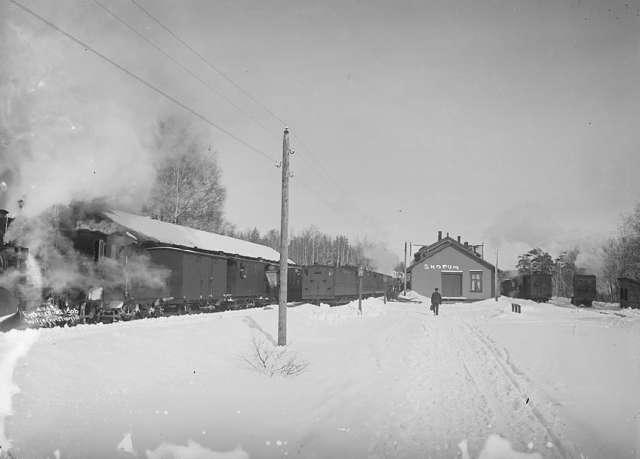
The station in 1906, as seen from the southern road access

When planning of the Vestfold Line commenced in 1871, there were three main proposals for a route. The outer followed the shore of the Oslofjord, would be 111 kilometers (69 mi) and would run through Holmestrand, Horten and Åsgårdstrand before reaching Tønsberg. The combined and inner would be 107 and 102 kilometers (66 and 63 mi), respectively, and both involved building a branch line to Horten. The main argument against the coastal route was that the towns already had a good steamship service, with several daily departures. A third major alternative was to bypass the coast altogether and build down the valley of Lågendalen to Larvik.

Shares for various routes were issued in 1873, and the coastal alternative proved to be the most popular. Still, the county politicians preferred an interior route when it applied for the government to build the line. Construction of the Jarlsberg and Horten Lines commenced in 1876. The lines were taken into use on 7 December 1881. The interchange station had the spelling Skopum until 1891.

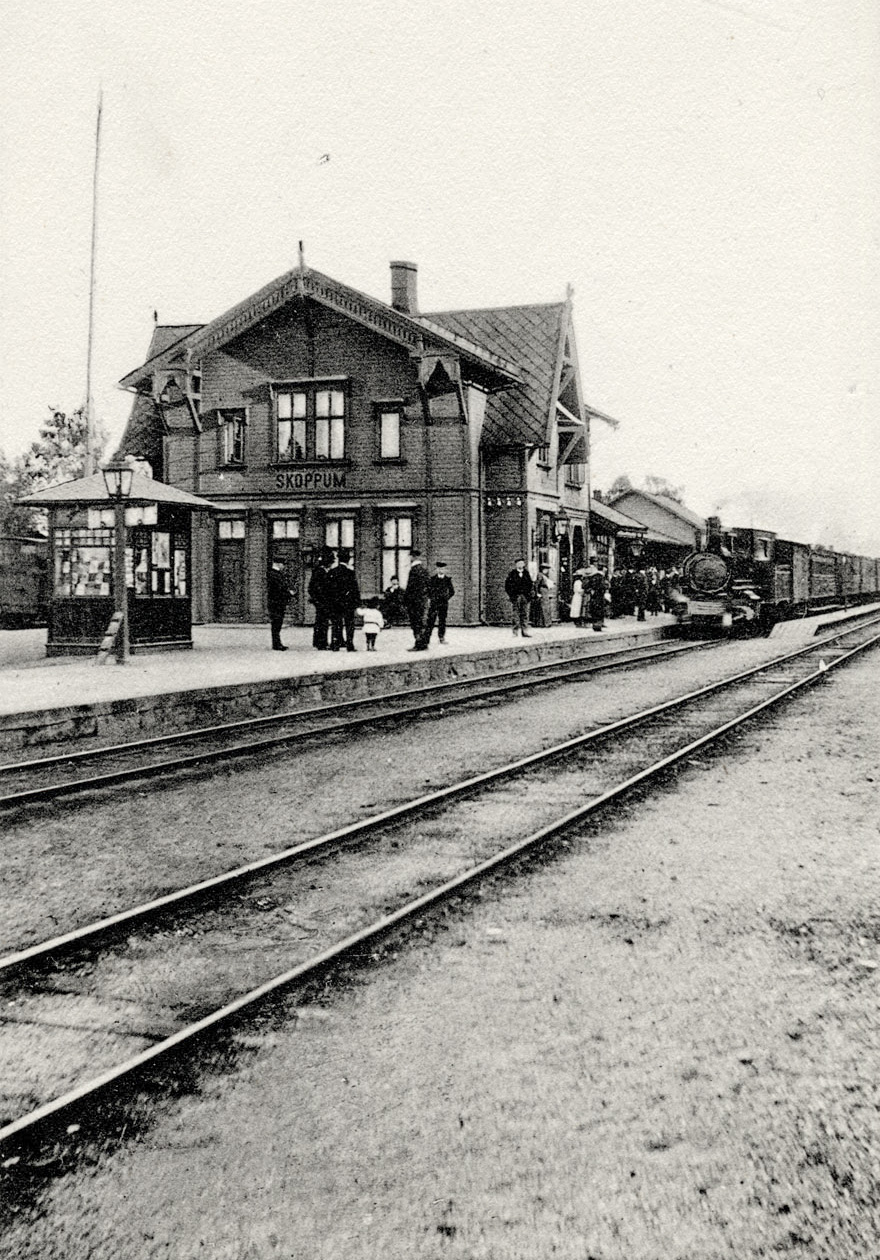
Train at the station around the previous turn of the century

Skoppum was a third-class station, given a more extensive design than many other stations serving rural areas because of its function as a transshipment station between the Vestfold Line and the Horten Line. The station originally consisted of an office for the station master, a ticket office, a waiting room and a restaurant, run by the station master's wife. Next to the station building there was a building for handling cargo. The station also originally contained a locomotive depot, water tower and a turntable. The depot had a place for a single locomotive, which was used on the Horten Line. At the time of the opening the station was staffed by a station mater, two telegraphists and two station workers. The station master lived in the four-room apartment in the upper story of the station building.

Initially the Horten Line had four trains per direction per day, increasing to seven in 1884. It reached eleven during the 1920s and peaked with thirteen from 1946. Travel time was initially 16 minutes between Skoppum and Horten. The line's patronage peaked in the 1920, when ca. 200,000 annual passengers were transported along with between 5,000 and 15,000 tonnes of cargo. An interlocking system was installed on 19 February 1934.

Though their bus division, NSB Biltrafikk, the railway company operated both bus and train services between Skoppum and Horten from the mid-1940s. The new standard gauge was taken into use on 3 October 1949. With the gauge conversion the number of daily services to eight. Electrification of the Vestfold Line was carried out in 1957, and the Horten Line became the last segment to receive electric traction, on 11 December 1957.

NSB gradually increased its focus on bus traffic on the route, reducing the number of train services to five from 1962. NSB decided that it was cheaper to operate all services by bus, and closed down all passenger services on the Horten Line from 26 May 1967. A modest amount of freight traffic was retained. Skoppum Station was unstaffed from 1 July 1971, when centralized traffic control was installed. It continued to have a staffed ticket sale until 1 January 2001. NSB introduced its "InterCity" service from 29 May 1978. Most stations on the Vestfold Line were closed, but Skoppum was kept as the key station to serve Horten. All traffic on the Horten Line terminated in 2002 and the line was demolished in 2009.

== Facilities ==
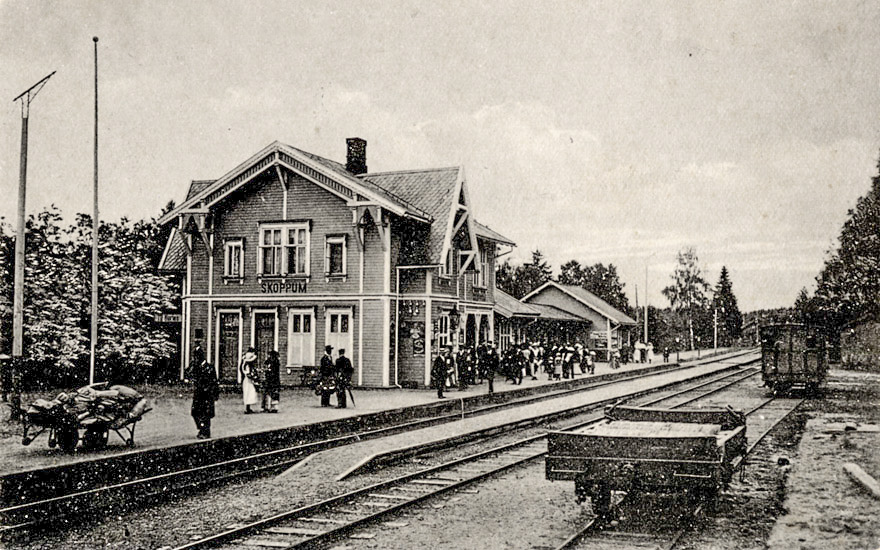
The station between 1897 and 1917

Skoppum Station is situated 99.54 kilometers (61.85 mi) from Oslo Central Station, at an elevation of 39 meters (128 ft) above mean sea level. The station building is open and has toilets and a ticket machine and vending machines. There are four tracks at the station, although two are closed. In addition to the Horten Line, this is an outer passing loop which is about 300 meters (980 ft). The main passing loop is 547 meters (1,795 ft). There are two platforms, with track 1 next to the station and track 2 a side platform. They are 228 and 208 meters (748 and 682 ft) long, respectively, with 55-and-30-centimeter (22 and 12 in) tall platforms. There is about 100 parking spaces and a bicycle rack at the station.

Balthazar Lange was selected as the main architect for the Vestfold and Horten Lines, and thus also designed Skoppum, which was designed in Swiss chalet style. To accommodate best possible transfer between the two lines, the station building and auxiliary structures were placed in the central of an island platform, denoted as an island station. The buildings were covered with a 27-meter (89 ft) adjoined roof, called an umbrella. Although providing excellent transfer conditions, the keilbahnhof-design meant that access to the station had to take place from the southern short end. A second platform and third track serves a passing loop. The unique design has caused the station building, goods shed and umbrella to listed as heritage sites.

== Service ==
Vy serves Skoppum with line RE11, a regional service running between Skien Station through Vestfold to Oslo Central Station and onward on the Gardermoen Line to Eidsvoll Station. Trains run once per hour in each direction, in addition to rush-hour services. Travel time is 1 hour and 10 minutes to Oslo, and 1 hour and 30 minutes to Skien.

Vestfold Kollektivtrafikk serves Skoppum with Line 1 which shuttles in to downtown Horten. Travel time is no shorter than 20 minutes. Buses run once or twice per hour. The buses and trains do not correspond in either direction.

== Future ==
The Vestfold Line is being upgraded to high-speed rail, with the section north of Tønsberg scheduled for completion by 2024. The section through Horten is bound by two components. The first is that the line needs to be dimensioned for through speeds of 250 km/h (160 mph). The second is that two smaller sections of line have already been upgraded. The first is a 1.2-kilometer (0.75 mi) passing loop at the closed Nykirke Station which opened on 15 October 2001. The second was 7.8 kilometers (4.8 mi) of double track from Tønsberg Station to the closed Barkåker Station, including the Jarlsberg Tunnel, which opened on 7 November 2011. These were both built without a plan for where the line in between would run. With the 2016 opening of the Holmestrand Tunnel, Nykirke–Barkåker and the section through Kobbervikdalen are the only remaining sections needed for a continual high-speed line between Drammen and Tønsberg.

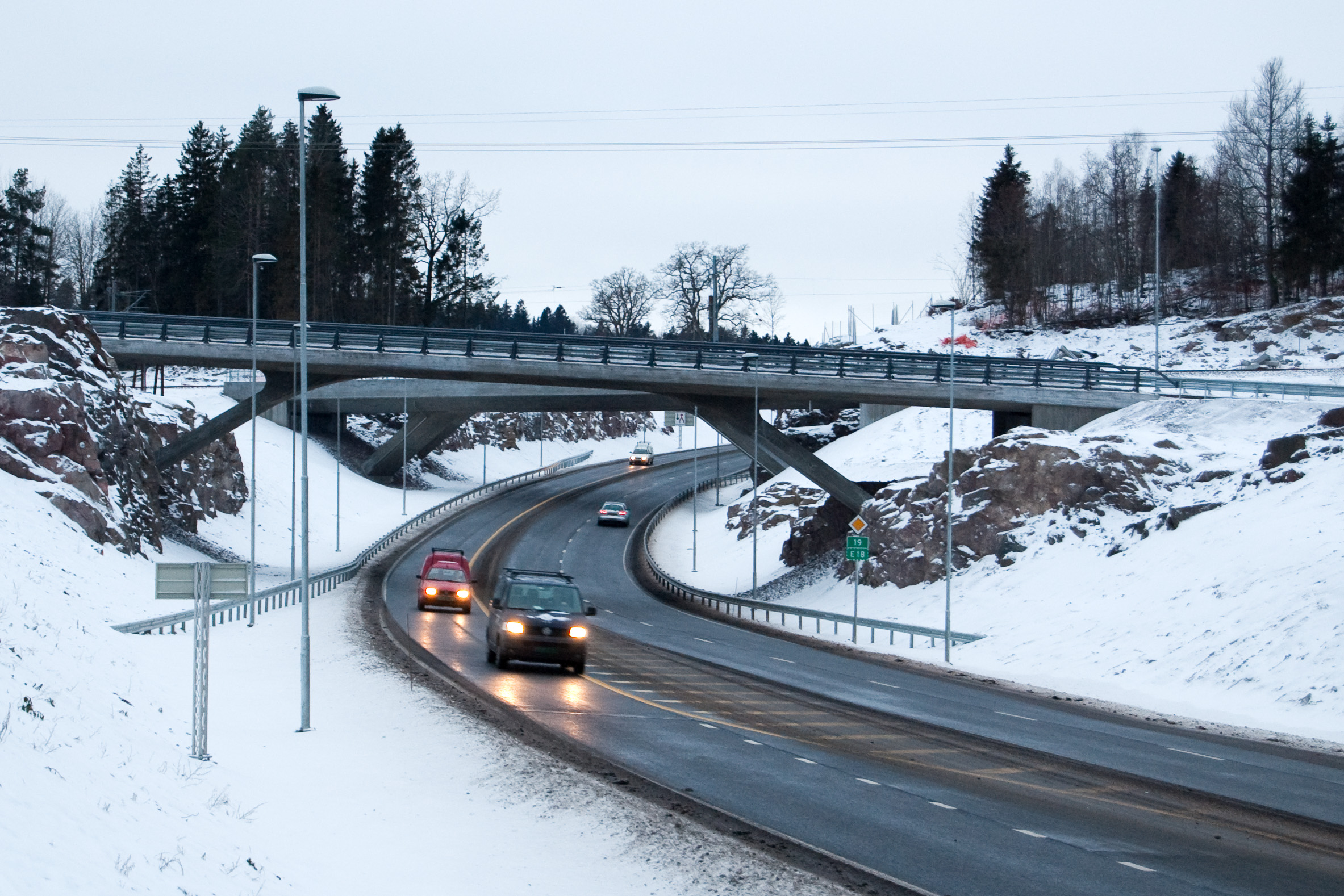
The site where the Vestfold Line passes under National Road 19, just south of Skoppum. A potential new Skoppum West Station would be situated somewhat further west than the current line.

The conditions made it impossible to place a line through the town of Horten, forcing the Norwegian National Rail Administration to consider three routes which entirely bypassed the town. Three proposals were made. The two easternmost, denoted Bakkenteigen and Skoppum East, would largely be carried on a large viaduct over the landscape. The third, Skuppum West, would run entirely west of the existing track and pass west of the village of Skoppum. Either way the new station will need a feeder bus service as well as be built with significant park and ride facilities.

The 16-kilometer (9.9 mi) Bakkenteigen alternative would serve the Vestfold campus of the University College of Southeast Norway. Its viaduct would be 2 kilometers (1.2 mi) long. It could also pass through the village of Nykirke. Bakketeigen is regarded as having the best possibility for urban development. Skoppum East would be 1-kilometer (0.62 mi) shorter, with a slightly shorter viaduct and a slightly longer tunnels. Skoppum West would avoid viaducts and be only 14 kilometers (8.7 mi), but have 7.2 kilometers (4.5 mi) of tunnel. The station would be situated on National Road 19, just off the intersection with E18, west of the village of Skoppum. The latter has the lowest investment costs, and the least interference with the landscape. The National Rail Administration has therefore recommended Skoppum West.

Preceding station			Following station
Tønsberg	Vestfold Line		Holmestrand
Borre	Horten Line (demolished)		Terminus
Preceding station	Regional trains		Following station
Tønsberg	RE11	Skien–Oslo S–Eidsvoll	Holmestrand
