= Sande Station =

Railway station in Sande, Norway

Sande
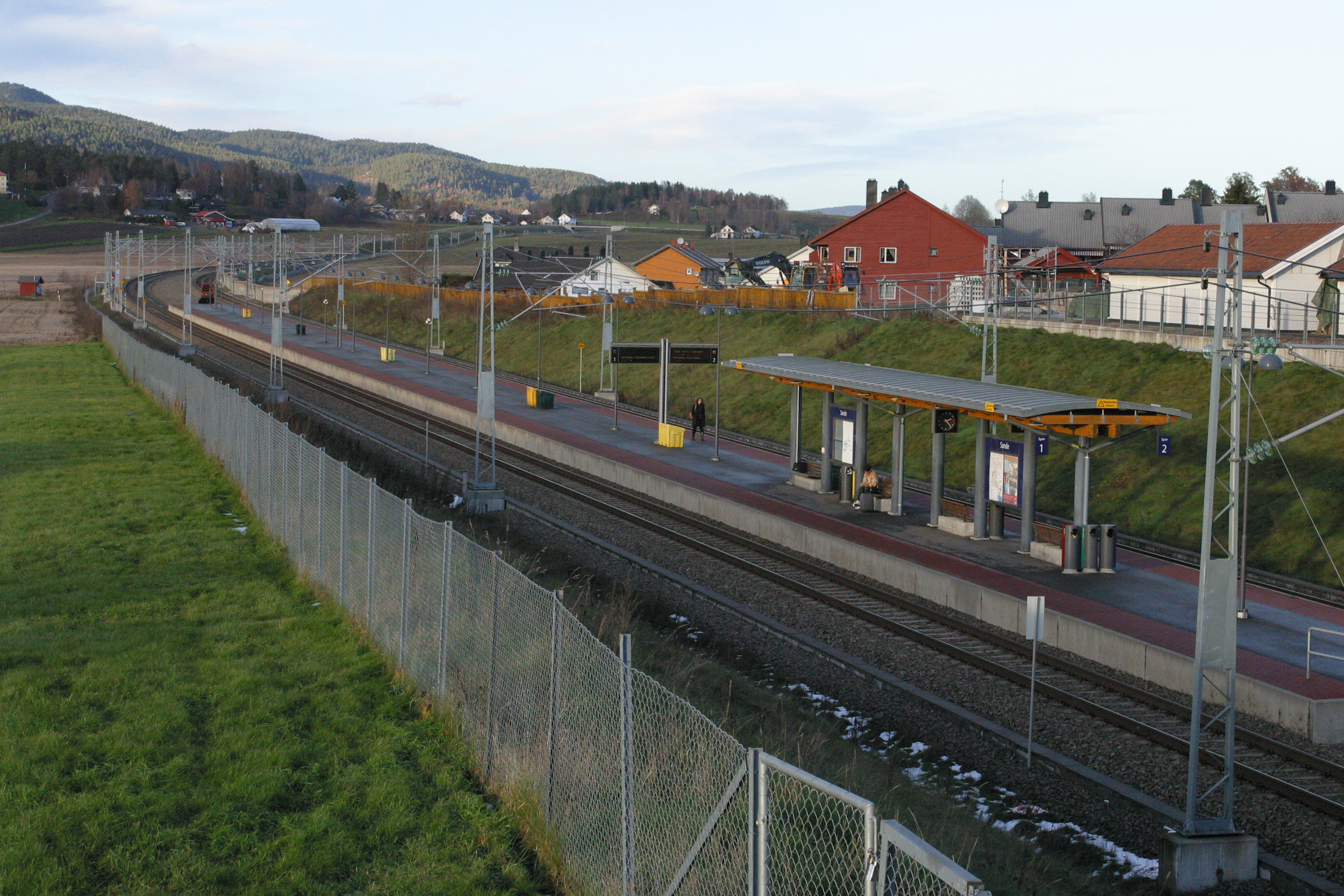

General information
- Location: Sande, Norway
- Coordinates: 59°35′06″N 10°12′18″E
- Owner: Bane NOR
- Operator: Vy
- Line: Vestfold Line
- Distance: 72.86
- Platforms: 2

History
- Opened: 1881
Location

Sande Station (Norwegian: Sande stasjon) is a railway station on the Vestfold Line in the village of Sande in Holmestrand Municipality in Vestfold county, Norway. The station is served with regional trains on the RE11 line operated by Vy.

The original station building opened in 1881, but a new station was built in 2001 as part of the new Vestfold Line through Sande.

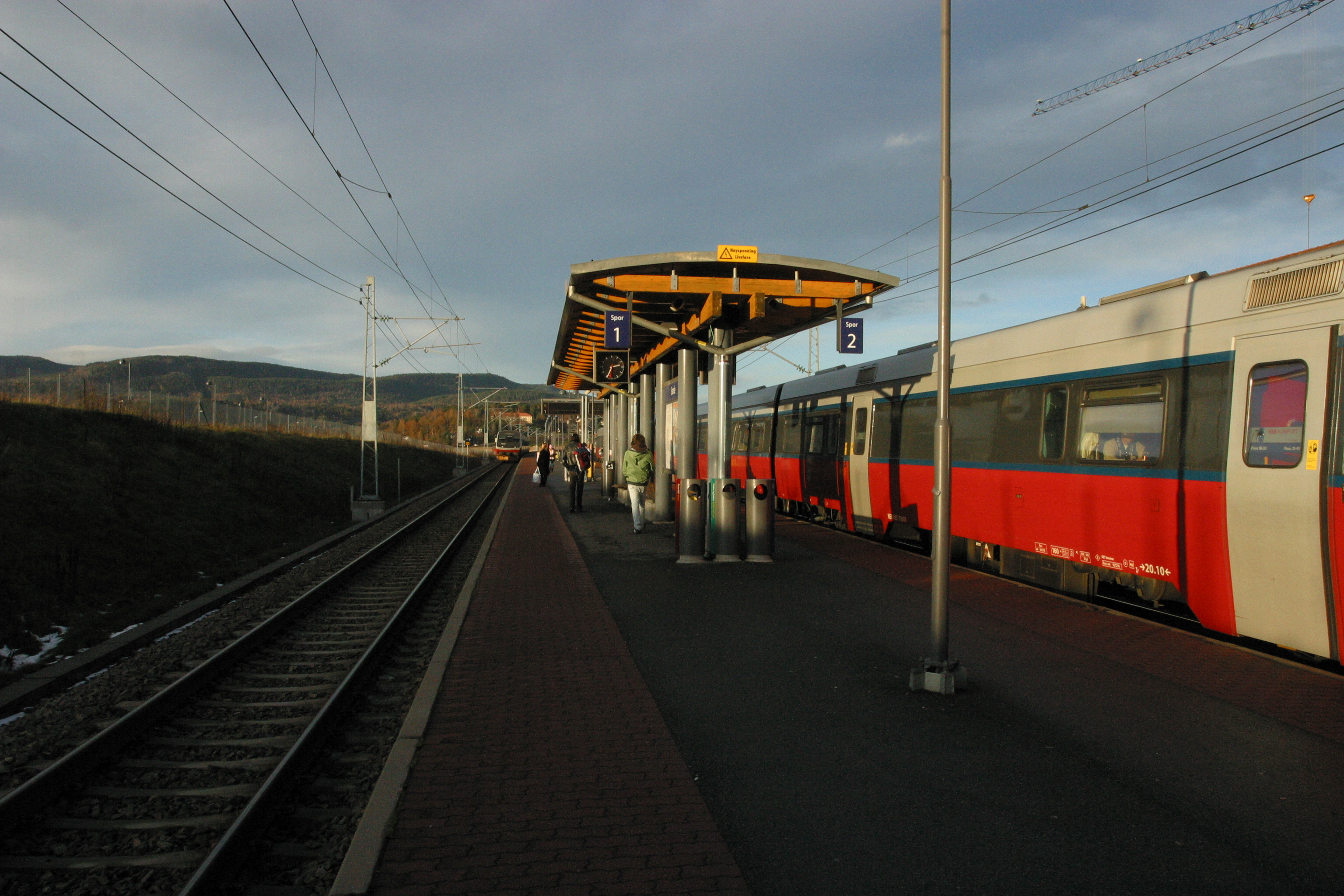
Train to Oslo

Preceding station			Following station
Holmestrand	Vestfold Line		Drammen
Preceding station	Regional trains		Following station
Holmestrand	RE11	Skien–Oslo S–Eidsvoll	Drammen
