= Timeline of railway electrification in Norway =

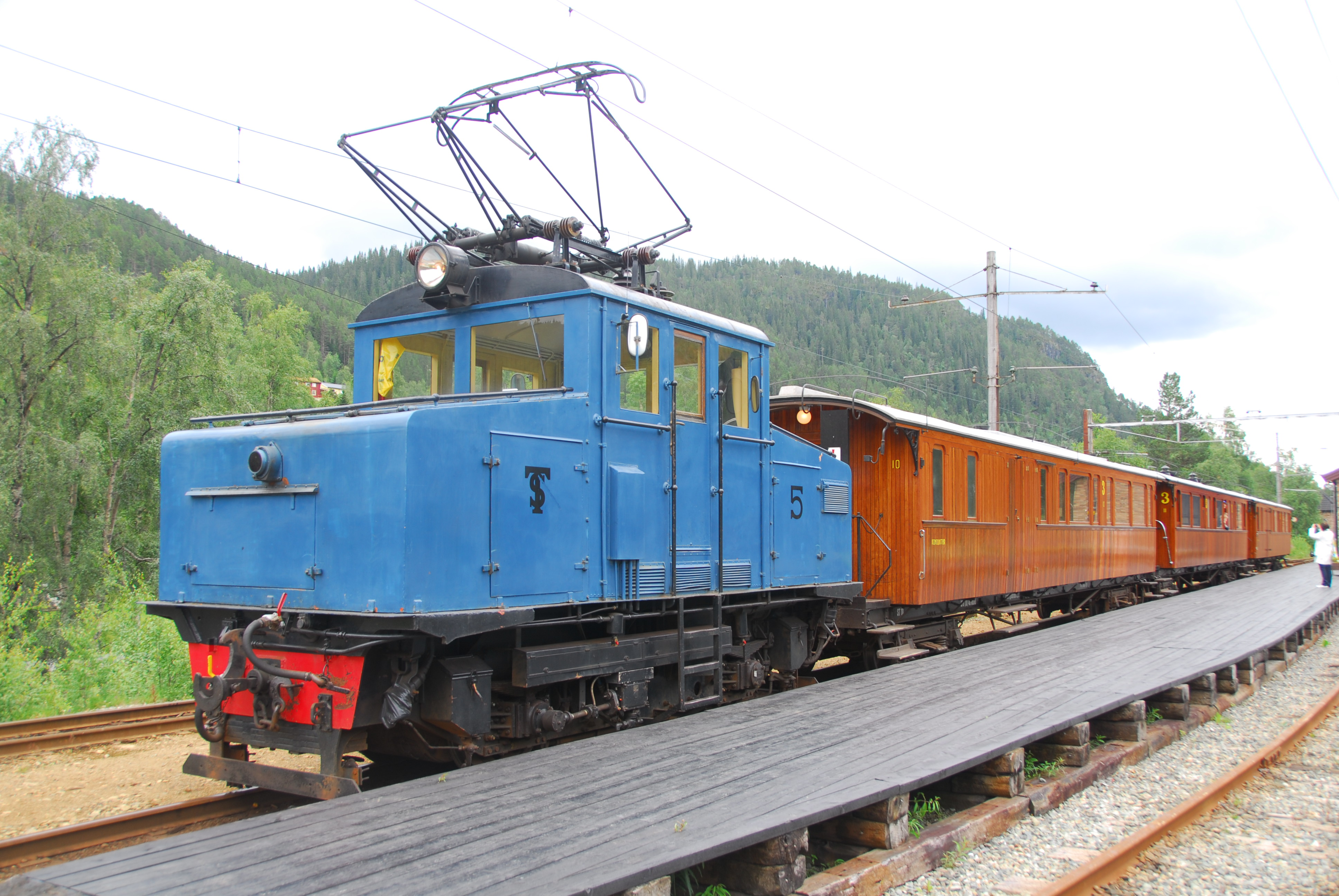
The Thamshavn Line became Norway's first electrified when it opened in 1908.

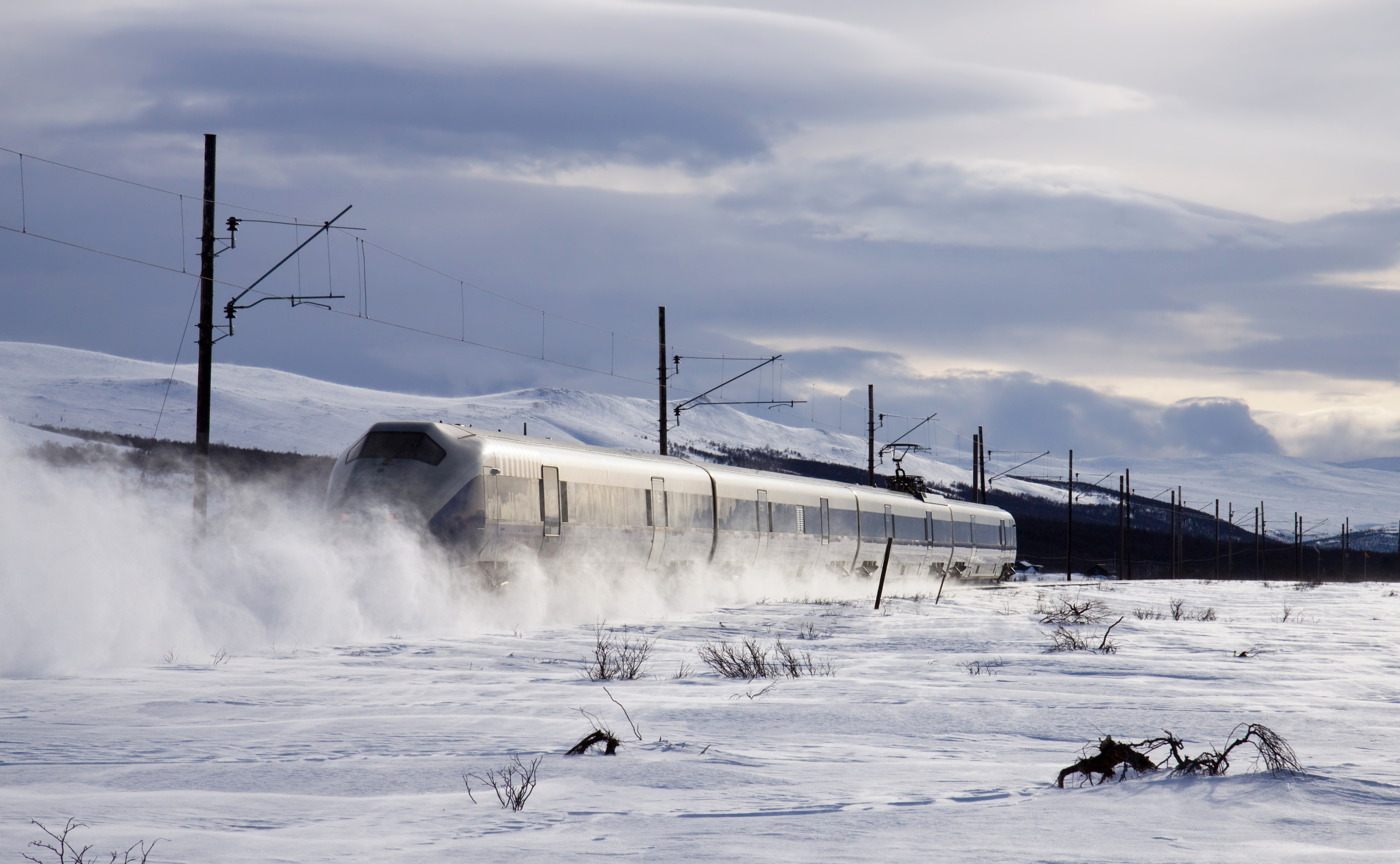
Class 73 train near Dombås on the Dovre Line

The Norwegian railway network consists of 2,552 kilometers (1,586 mi) of electrified railway lines, constituting 62% of the Norwegian National Rail Administration's 4,114 kilometers (2,556 mi) of line. The first three mainline systems to be electrified were private ore-hauling lines. The Thamshavn Line opened in 1909, and remained in revenue use until 1973, after which it was converted to a heritage railway. It is the world's oldest remaining alternating-current railway and the only narrow gauge railway in the country to have been electrified. It was followed by Norsk Transport's Rjukan and Tinnoset Lines two years later, and Sydvaranger's Kirkenes–Bjørnevatn Line in 1922. The Norwegian State Railways' (NSB) first electrification was parts of the Drammen Line in 1922 and the ore-hauling Ofoten Line, which connects to the Iron Ore Line in Sweden, in 1923. The use of El 1 locomotives on the Drammen Line proved a large cost-saver over steam locomotives, and NSB started electrifying other lines around Oslo; from 1927 to 1930, the remainder of the Drammen Line and the continuation along the Randsfjorden and Sørlandet Lines to Kongsvinger Station were converted, along with the first section of the Trunk Line. In 1935, the Hardanger Line became the first section of new NSB track to be electrified. From 1936 to 1940, NSB electrified the Østfold Line, as well as more of the Sørland Line and the Bratsberg Line, connecting all electric lines west of Oslo.

During the 1940s, NSB electrified the Sørland Line, although the final section from Egersund Station to Stavanger Station was not converted until 1956. In 1957, the Kirkenes–Bjørnevatn Line became the only line to remove the electrification and replace the electric locomotives with diesel power. The 1950s saw the electrification of several regional and commuter lines around Oslo, including the Kongsvinger Line, the Trunk Line and the Dovre Line from Lillestrøm to Hamar Station, the Vestfold Line and the Eastern Østfold Line. This was largely due to NSB's program to remove all steam locomotives, either by electrification or by dieselization. In the late 1950s and 1960s, several to-be electrified lines were operated with diesel locomotives as an interim solution. The 1960s saw the remaining two steam lines in Southern Norway, the Bergen and Dovre Lines, electrified along with the Gjøvik Line. The Bergen Line was completed in 1964 and the Dovre Line completed in 1970. This finished all the planned electrifications, and the authorities deemed the remaining lines unprofitable to electrify because of low traffic. During the 1990s, a new program was attempted, this time to electrify the entire network, but only the Arendal Line was converted before the program was canceled. However, new lines around Oslo, including the Lieråsen and Oslo Tunnels on the Drammen Line and the Gardermoen and Asker Lines, were electrified at the time they opened. Further plans have been launched, in particular the section of the Nordland Line from Trondheim to Steinkjer Station, which is part of the Trøndelag Commuter Rail, and the Meråker Line, which connects to the electrified Central Line in Sweden.

In 2008, electric traction accounted for 90% of the passenger kilometers, 93% of the tonne kilometers and 74% of the energy consumption of all trains running in Norway, with the rest being accounted for by diesel traction. Technology for electric railways was demonstrated in Germany in 1879; the first revenue line took electric traction into use in 1881. The first electric industrial railway in Norway opened in 1892 at Skotfos Bruk near Skien. Two years later, parts of the Oslo Tramway were electrified. The first alternating current (AC) line became operational in 1892, while the first line to use a single-phase, single overhead wire power supply opened in Germany in 1903. In 1912, all German railways agreed to use the 15 kV 16.7 Hz AC standard, which was later adopted first by Sweden and then by NSB. Several of the private lines that preceded NSB's electrification chose different standards. Sydvaranger chose to install the only mainline direct current (DC) and third rail system.

== Timeline ==
Map of the railway lines in Norway. — electrified lines — non-electrified lines — disused or heritage lines

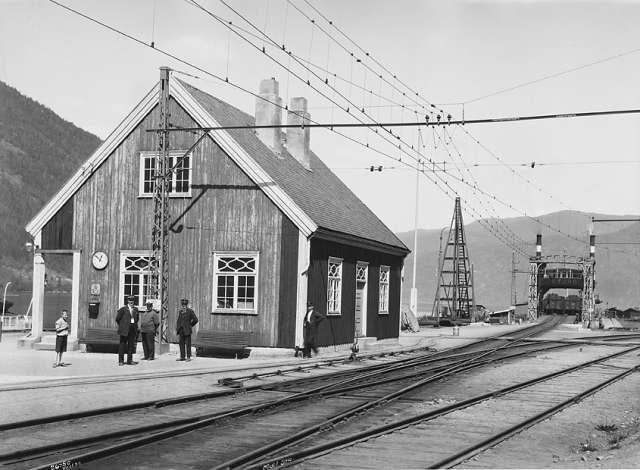
Mæl Station where the Rjukan Line connects with the Tinnsjø railway ferry

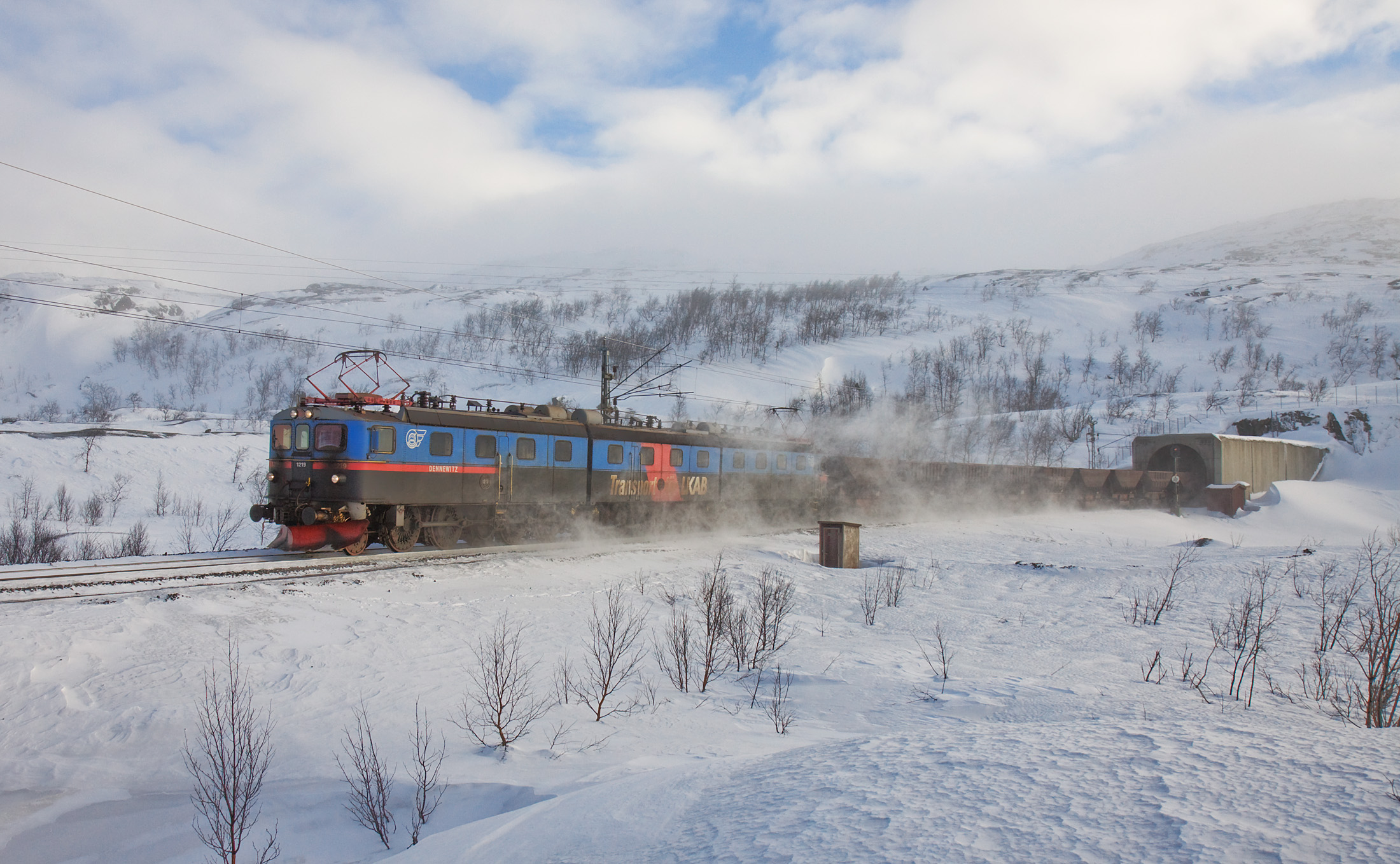
Dm3-hauled ore train on the Ofoten Line

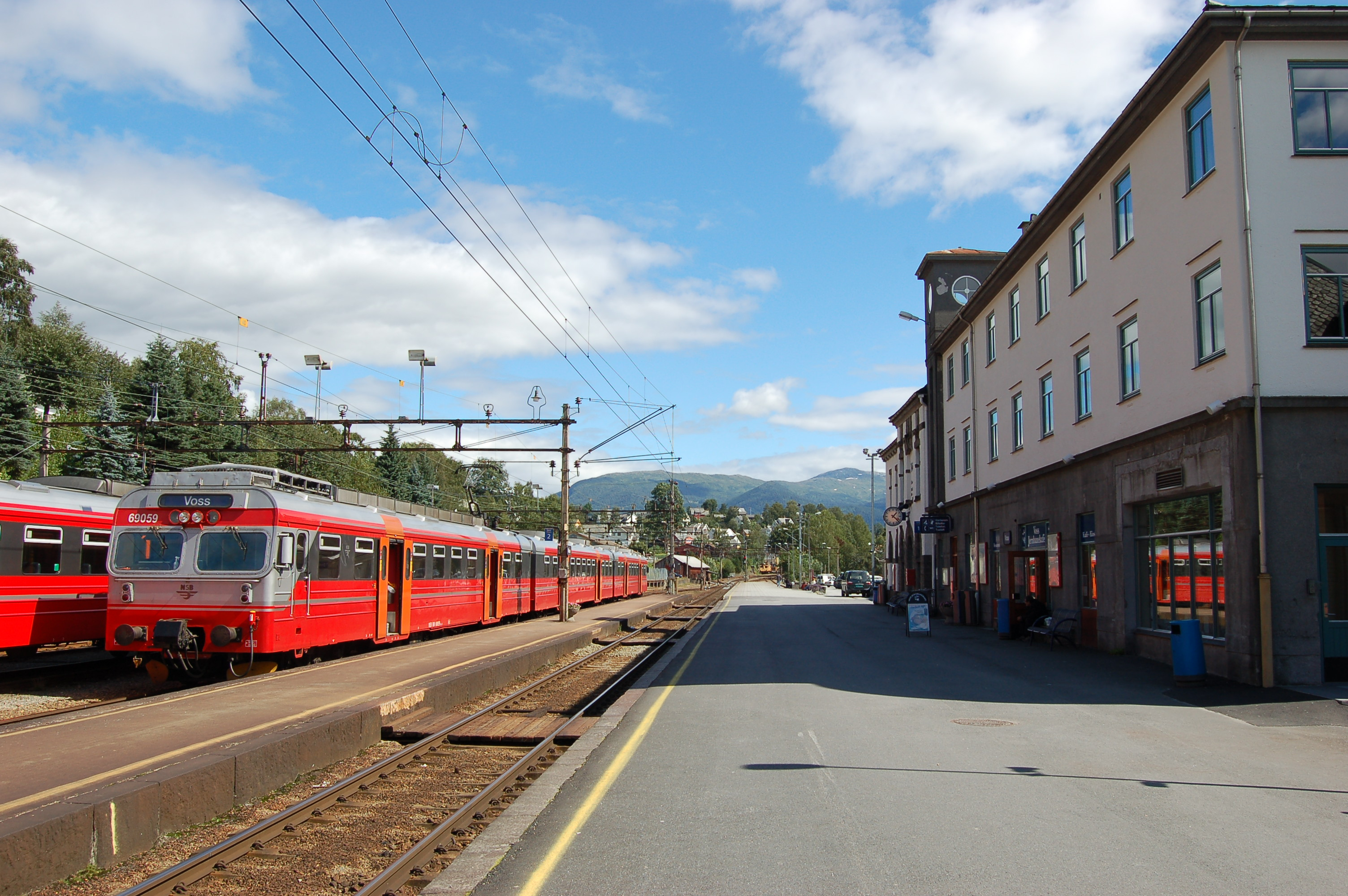
Voss Station is the terminus of the Bergen Commuter Rail, operated with Class 69 units.

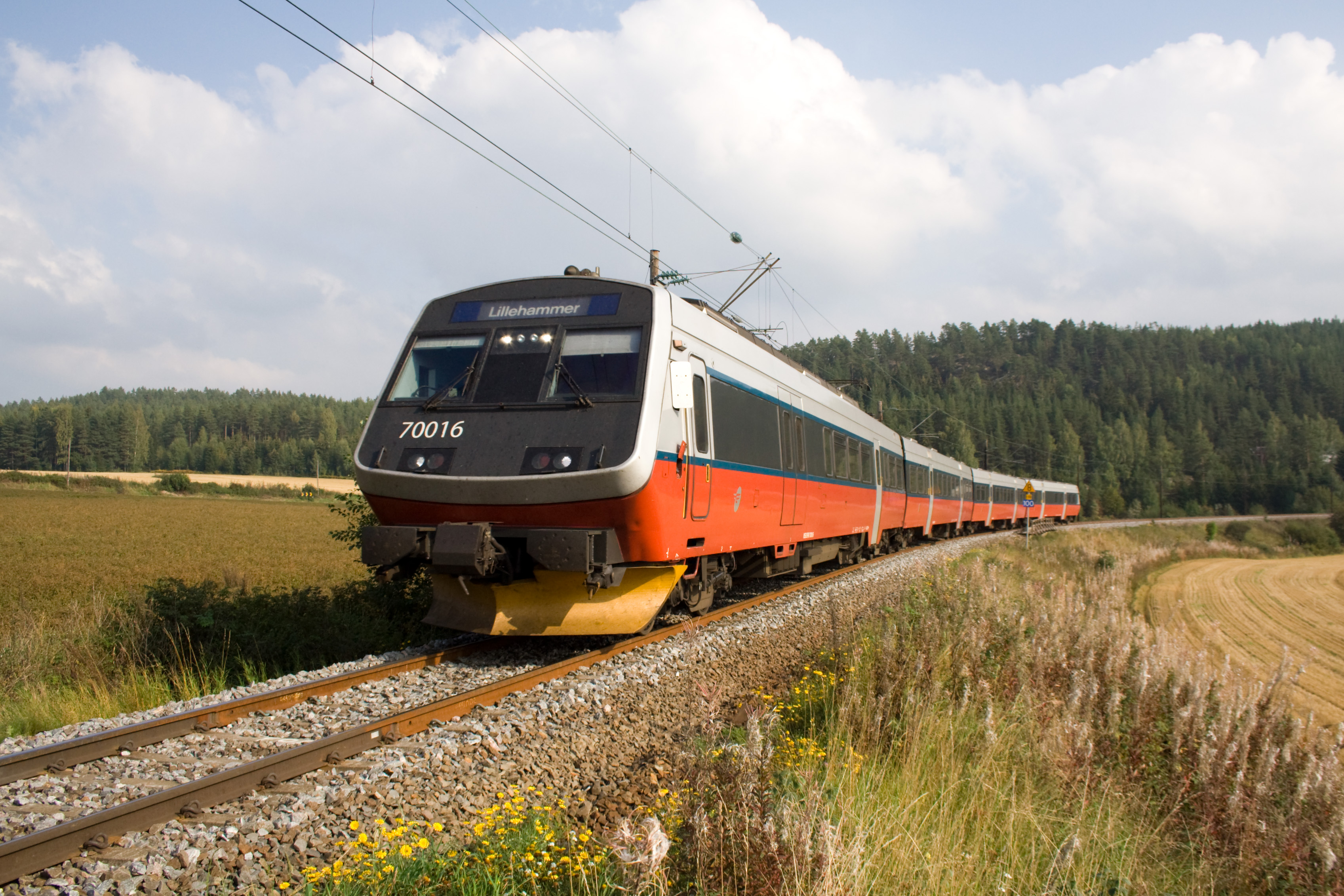
Class 70 train near Tangen on the Dovre Line

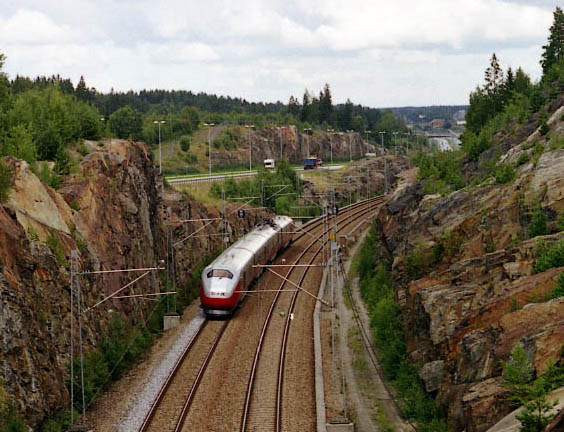
Class 73b train on the double-track section of the Østfold Line near Vestby

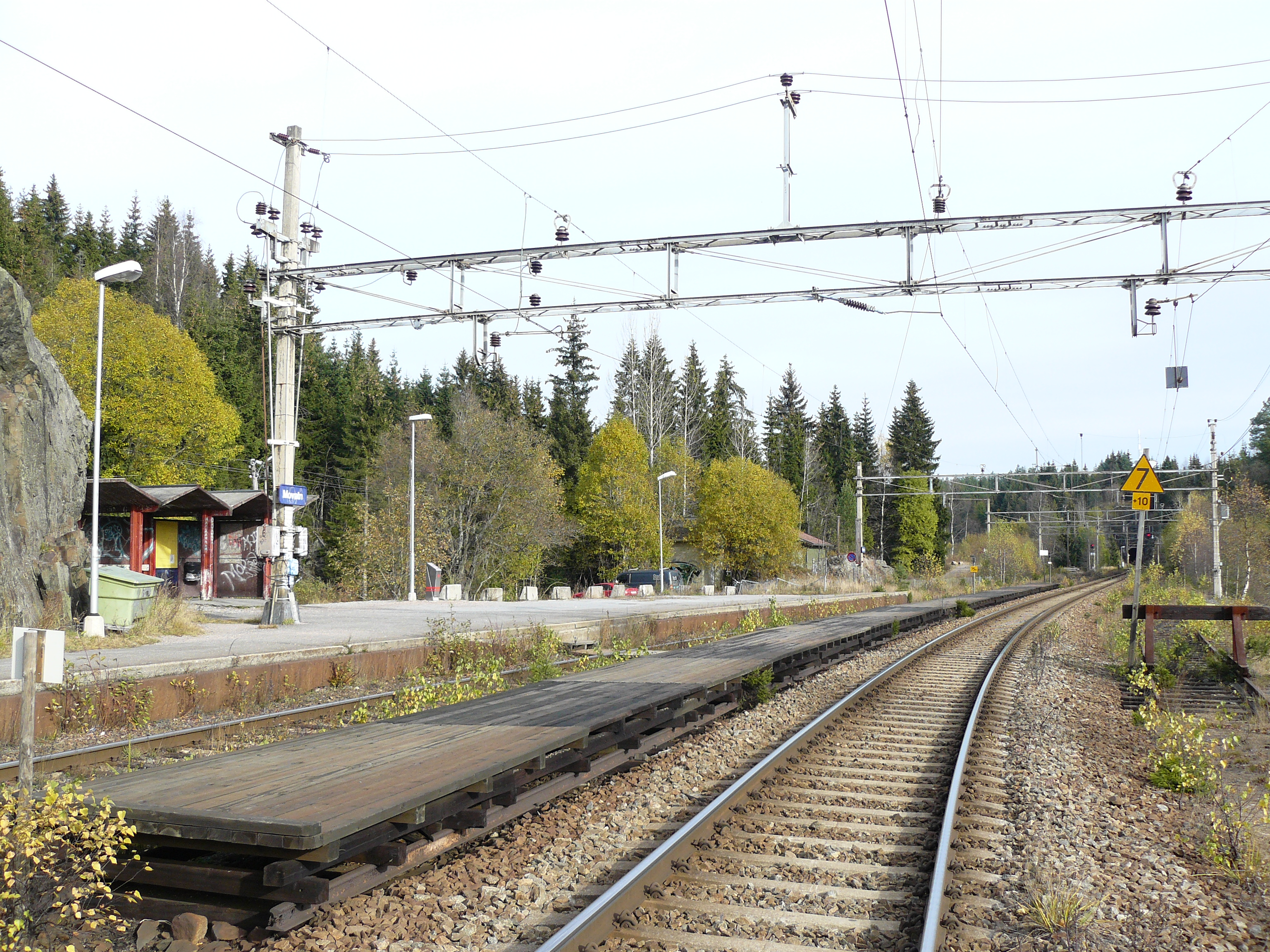
Overhead wires at Movatn Station on the Gjøvik Line

The following list contains a chronology of when the various sections of mainline railway lines were electrified. The list excludes industrial and short branch lines, as well as systems installed at ports and yards. The list contains the date when the electrification was taken into regular use on each section. It also notes if a section was opened as an electric railway, and if the line was prepared as an electric line, but where this was not taken into use immediately. The list contains the line and section to be electrified, and its length. The length indicates the length of the mainline section at the time of electrification. Due to changes of routes and shortening of lines, the current length of sections may be shorter. The sixth column shows the electrification system, including voltage and frequency in case of AC and no frequency in case of DC.

†	Opened as electric
††	Planned as electric
*	Private

Date	Line	Section	Length (km)	Length (mi)	System	Ref(s)
10 July 1908^{†}	Thamshavn*	Thamshavn–Svorkmo	19.3	12.0	6.6 kV 25 Hz AC	
October 1908^{†}	Thamshavn*	Svorkmo–Løkken	6.0	3.7	6.6 kV 25 Hz AC	
11 July 1911^{††} (Note: The Tinnoset Line was taken into non-electrified use on 9 August 1909.)	Tinnoset*	Notodden–Tinnoset	30.0	18.6	10 kV 16 2/3 Hz AC	
30 November 1911^{††} (Note: The Rjukan Line was taken into non-electrified use on 9 August 1909.)	Rjukan*	Rjukan–Mæl	16.0	9.9	10 kV 16 2/3 Hz AC	
23 December 1920	Kirkenes–Bjørnevatn*	Kirkenes–Bjørnevatn	7.5	4.7	750 V DC	
26 November 1922	Drammen	Oslo V – Brakerøya	50.8	31.6	15 kV 16 2/3 Hz AC	
11 July 1923	Ofoten	Narvik–Riksgränsen	41.9	26.0	15 kV 16 2/3 Hz AC	
1 September 1927	Trunk	Oslo Ø – Lillestrøm	21.0	13.0	15 kV 16 2/3 Hz AC	
15 October 1928	Loenga–Alnabru	Loenga–Alnabru	7.3	4.5	15 kV 16 2/3 Hz AC	
10 April 1929	Sørlandet	Drammen–Kongsberg	48.6	30.2	15 kV 16 2/3 Hz AC	
6 May 1930	Drammen	Brakerøya–Drammen	2.4	1.5	15 kV 16 2/3 Hz AC	
1 April 1935^{†}	Hardanger	Voss–Granvin	27.5	17.1	15 kV 16 2/3 Hz AC	
29 January 1936	Sørlandet	Kongsberg–Hjuksebø	36.9	22.9	15 kV 16 2/3 Hz AC	
7 May 1936	Bratsberg	Notodden–Borgestad	60.6	37.7	15 kV 16 2/3 Hz AC	
9 December 1936	Østfold	Oslo Ø – Ljan	7.2	4.5	15 kV 16 2/3 Hz AC	
18 January 1937	Østfold	Ljan–Kolbotn	5.6	3.5	15 kV 16 2/3 Hz AC	
1 September 1939	Østfold	Kornsjø–Riksgrensen	1.0	0.6	15 kV 16 2/3 Hz AC	
10 September 1939	Østfold	Halden–Kornsjø	32.5	20.2	15 kV 16 2/3 Hz AC	
24 September 1939	Østfold	Kolbotn–Ås	18.9	11.7	15 kV 16 2/3 Hz AC	
9 January 1940	Østfold	Ås–Dilling	34.1	21.2	15 kV 16 2/3 Hz AC	
1 May 1940	Østfold	Dilling–Fredrikstad	28.9	18.0	15 kV 16 2/3 Hz AC	
15 July 1940	Østfold	Fredrikstad–Sarpsborg	15.2	9.4	15 kV 16 2/3 Hz AC	
11 November 1940	Østfold	Sarpsborg–Halden	27.2	16.9	15 kV 16 2/3 Hz AC	
15 October 1942	Sørlandet	Nordagutu–Lunde	31.6	19.6	15 kV 16 2/3 Hz AC	
18 April 1943	Sørlandet	Lunde–Neslandsvatn	44.2	27.5	15 kV 16 2/3 Hz AC	
18 February 1944	Sørlandet	Marnardal–Sira	62.4	38.8	15 kV 16 2/3 Hz AC	
20 March 1944	Vestfold	Skien–Eikonrød	3.3	2.1	15 kV 16 2/3 Hz AC	
24 November 1944^{††} (Note: The Flåm Line was taken into non-electrified use on 15 October 1941.)	Flåm	Myrdal–Flåm	20.4	12.7	15 kV 16 2/3 Hz AC	
16 May 1946^{††} (Note: The section from Kristiansand to Sira was taken into non-electrified use on 1 March 1944.)	Sørlandet	Kristiansand–Marnardal	36.7	22.8	15 kV 16 2/3 Hz AC	
26 August 1948	Sørlandet	Neslandsvatn–Nelaug	60.7	37.7	15 kV 16 2/3 Hz AC	
1 June 1949	Sørlandet	Nelaug–Kristiansand	83.9	52.1	15 kV 16 2/3 Hz AC	
19 July 1949	Brevik	Borgestad–Brevik	9.4	5.8	15 kV 16 2/3 Hz AC	
1 February 1950	Sørlandet	Sira–Egersund	56.9	35.4	15 kV 16 2/3 Hz AC	
15 June 1951	Kongsvinger	Lillestrøm–Riksgrensen	114.6	71.2	15 kV 16 2/3 Hz AC	
15 June 1953	Trunk	Lillestrøm–Eidsvoll	46.9	29.1	15 kV 16 2/3 Hz AC	
15 June 1953	Dovre	Eidsvoll–Hamar	58.6	36.4	15 kV 16 2/3 Hz AC	
2 July 1954	Bergen	Bergen–Voss	106.7	66.3	15 kV 16 2/3 Hz AC	
3 June 1956	Sørland	Egersund–Stavanger	76.3	47.4	15 kV 16 2/3 Hz AC	
5 October 1956	Vestfold	Eidanger–Larvik	34.0	21.1	15 kV 16 2/3 Hz AC	
20 May 1957	Vestfold	Larvik–Tønsberg	43.0	26.7	15 kV 16 2/3 Hz AC	
5 December 1957	Vestfold	Tønsberg–Drammen	57.9	36.0	15 kV 16 2/3 Hz AC	
11 December 1957	Horten	Skoppum–Horten	7.0	4.3	15 kV 16 2/3 Hz AC	
5 December 1958	Eastern Østfold	Ski–Sarpsborg	80.5	50.0	15 kV 16 2/3 Hz AC	
4 October 1959	Randsfjorden	Hokksund–Hønefoss	54.0	33.6	15 kV 16 2/3 Hz AC	
1 February 1961	Roa–Hønefoss	Roa–Hønefoss	32.0	19.9	15 kV 16 2/3 Hz AC	
1 February 1961	Alna	Grefsen–Alnabru	5.2	3.2	15 kV 16 2/3 Hz AC	
1 February 1961	Gjøvik	Loenga–Kværner	2.1	1.3	15 kV 16 2/3 Hz AC	
1 February 1961	Gjøvik	Oslo Ø – Jaren	71.9	44.7	15 kV 16 2/3 Hz AC	
1 December 1962	Bergen	Hønefoss–Ål	138.6	86.1	15 kV 16 2/3 Hz AC	
17 February 1963	Gjøvik	Jaren–Eina	29.0	18.0	15 kV 16 2/3 Hz AC	
21 August 1963	Gjøvik	Eina–Gjøvik	22.9	14.2	15 kV 16 2/3 Hz AC	
15 December 1963	Bergen	Ål–Ustaoset	36.5	22.7	15 kV 16 2/3 Hz AC	
1 August 1964	Bergen	Tunestveit–Bergen	12.0	7.5	15 kV 16 2/3 Hz AC	
7 December 1964	Bergen	Ustaoset–Voss	120.7	75.0	15 kV 16 2/3 Hz AC	
1 November 1966	Dovre	Hamar–Fåberg	65.4	40.6	15 kV 16 2/3 Hz AC	
5 November 1967	Dovre	Fåberg–Otta	106.6	66.2	15 kV 16 2/3 Hz AC	
29 September 1968	Dovre	Otta–Hjerkinn	84.5	52.5	15 kV 16 2/3 Hz AC	
1 November 1970	Dovre	Hjerkinn – Trondheim S	171.1	106.3	15 kV 16 2/3 Hz AC	
3 June 1973^{†}	Drammen	Asker–Brakerøya	15.5	9.6	15 kV 16 2/3 Hz AC	
1 June 1980^{†}	Drammen	Oslo S – Skøyen	3.6	2.2	15 kV 16 2/3 Hz AC	
15 June 1995	Arendal	Nelaug–Arendal	36.2	22.5	15 kV 16 2/3 Hz AC	
8 October 1998^{†}	Gardermoen	Lillestrøm–Eidsvoll	48.3	30.0	15 kV 16 2/3 Hz AC	
22 August 1999^{†}	Gardermoen	Etterstad–Lillestrøm	15.7	9.8	15 kV 16 2/3 Hz AC	
1 August 2005^{†}	Asker	Sandvika–Asker	9.7	6.0	15 kV 16 2/3 Hz AC	
Under construction, to open spring 2024	Stavne–Leangen	Marienborg–Leangen	5.8	3.6	15 kV 16 2/3 Hz AC	
Under construction, to open spring 2024	Nordland	Trondheim–Stjørdal	34.7	21.6	15 kV 16 2/3 Hz AC	
Under construction, to open autumn 2024	Meråker	Hell–the border near Storlien	70.7	43.9	15 kV 16 2/3 Hz AC	

== Notes and references ==
=== Bibliography ===
- Aspenberg, Nils Carl (2001). Elektrolok i Norge (in Norwegian). Oslo: Baneforlaget. ISBN 82-91448-42-6.
- Bjerke, Thor; Holom, Finn (2004). Banedata 2004 (in Norwegian). Hamar / Oslo: Norsk Jernbanemuseum / Norsk Jernbaneklubb. ISBN 82-90286-28-7.
- "Railway Statistics 2008" (PDF). Norwegian National Rail Administration. 2009a. Archived from the original (pdf) on 22 November 2010.
- "Miljørapport 2008" (pdf) (in Norwegian). Norwegian National Rail Administration. 2009b.
