= Follo Line =

High-speed railway line in Norway

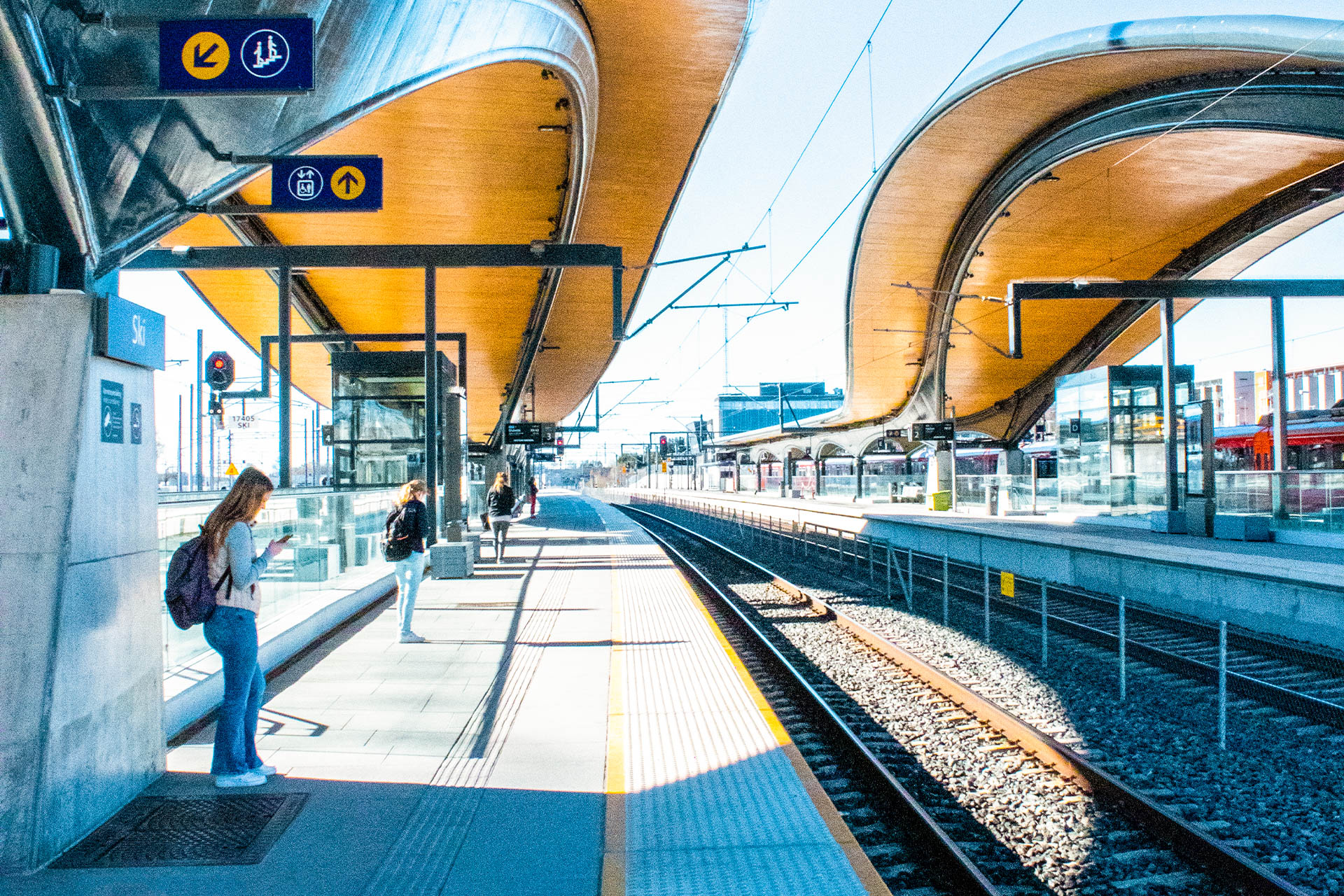
- Ski Station serves as the southern terminus of the Follo Line. As part of the project, the Ski Station was rebuilt.

Overview
- Native name: Follobanen
- Owner: Bane NOR
- Termini: Oslo S; Ski

Service
- Type: High-speed railway
- System: Norwegian railways

History
- Opened: 11 December 2022

Technical
- Line length: 22 kilometres (14 mi)
- Number of tracks: Double
- Character: Passenger
- Track gauge: 1,435 mm (4 ft 8 1/2 in)
- Electrification: 15 kV 16.7 Hz AC
- Operating speed: 200 km/h (125 mph); Planned: 250 km/h (155 mph)

The Follo Line (Norwegian: Follobanen) is a 22-kilometre (14 mi) high-speed railway between Oslo and Ski, Norway.

The line runs parallel to the Østfold Line, and is dimensioned for 250 km/h (155 mph). Most of the line, 19 kilometres (12 mi), runs in a twin-tube tunnel named the Blix Tunnel, which is the longest railway tunnel in the country. Construction started in 2015, and the line opened in 2022. The Follo Line increased capacity from twelve to forty trains per hour along the South Corridor, and allows express and regional trains to decrease travel time from Ski to Oslo from 22 to 11 minutes. The line was projected to cost over 26 billion Norwegian kroner (NOK) in 2014, but the final cost became 36.8 billion NOK when it was completed.

The project was a continuation of the Norwegian National Rail Administration's (now Bane NOR) plan to build four tracks along the three main corridors out of Oslo; the Gardermoen Line was completed in 1998, and the Asker Line was completed in 2011. Between 1989 and 1996, the Østfold Line south of Ski to Moss was upgraded to double track and higher speeds. To take full advantage of this and allow the rest of the Østfold Line to be upgraded for high speeds, it was necessary to increase capacity through the bottleneck from Oslo to Ski.

The Follo Line is hoped to increase rush hour rail ridership by 63%, and increased freight on rail is hoped to remove 750 trucks daily from roads like E6 and E18.

== History ==
=== Background ===
The first railway in the Follo district was the Østfold Line of the Norwegian State Railways (NSB) that opened on 2 January 1879, between Oslo East Station and Halden. Later the same year, the line was extended to the Swedish border, where it connected to the Norway/Vänern Line. The importance of Ski Station increased on 24 November 1882, when it became the station where the Eastern Østfold Line split, and went via Inner Østfold to Sarpsborg, where the two lines reconnected. Electrification of the section from Oslo to Kolbotn was completed on 18 January 1937, and the section to Ski finished in 1939; the whole Østfold line was completed in 1940. Between 1924 and 1939, NSB built double track along the route between Ski and Oslo. From 1989 to 1996, NSB upgraded the track to double track from Ski to Sandbuka, just north of Moss. This section is capable of speeds of 200 km/h (125 mph), however the maximum is 160 km/h (100 mph) due to short distances between stops and limitations of the rolling stock.

In 1992, the Norwegian Parliament decided to build the first high-speed railway in Norway, from Oslo via the new Oslo Airport, Gardermoen to Eidsvoll. This line would run parallel to the Hoved Line, increasing the speed and capacity along the route. Fast express and regional trains could run along the new section, while slower commuter trains used the old tracks and could make many stops without disturbing other traffic. Projects were launched during the 1990s to create similar high-speed bypasses from Oslo to Ski, and from Skøyen (west of Oslo) to Asker. Construction of the latter—christened the Asker Line—started in 2001; the first section from Asker to Sandvika opened in 2005 , the second section to Lysaker opened in 2011. The Østfold Line between Oslo and Ski remains the largest bottle-neck on the Norwegian railway network. The line restrains the track to twelve trains per hour (six per direction) and hinders freight trains from using it during rush hour. The bottleneck occurs because there are up to four trains each hour making stops at all stations, and these stops delay all express and regional trains that follow. Travel time is 22 minutes for direct trains to Ski, and 31 minutes for commuter trains with a speed limit of 80 km/h (50 mph) along most of the line. Capacity on the upgraded double track from Ski to Moss cannot be fully utilized due to the limitations along the section from Ski to Oslo, and further growth in the number of freight trains along the South Corridor to Sweden and Continental Europe is impossible without reducing the number of passenger trains.

Despite the existing double track all the way from Oslo to Moss, a further upgrade southwards will not be able to increase capacity past the current single train per hour to Fredrikstad, Sarpsborg and Halden. The most optimistic plans involve finishing the first upgrades of track south of Moss simultaneously with the Follo Line. The Rail Administration and Ministry of Transport is working on proposals for a high-speed railway between Oslo and Gothenburg in Sweden. This line would most likely use the Follo Line for the initial distance from Oslo.

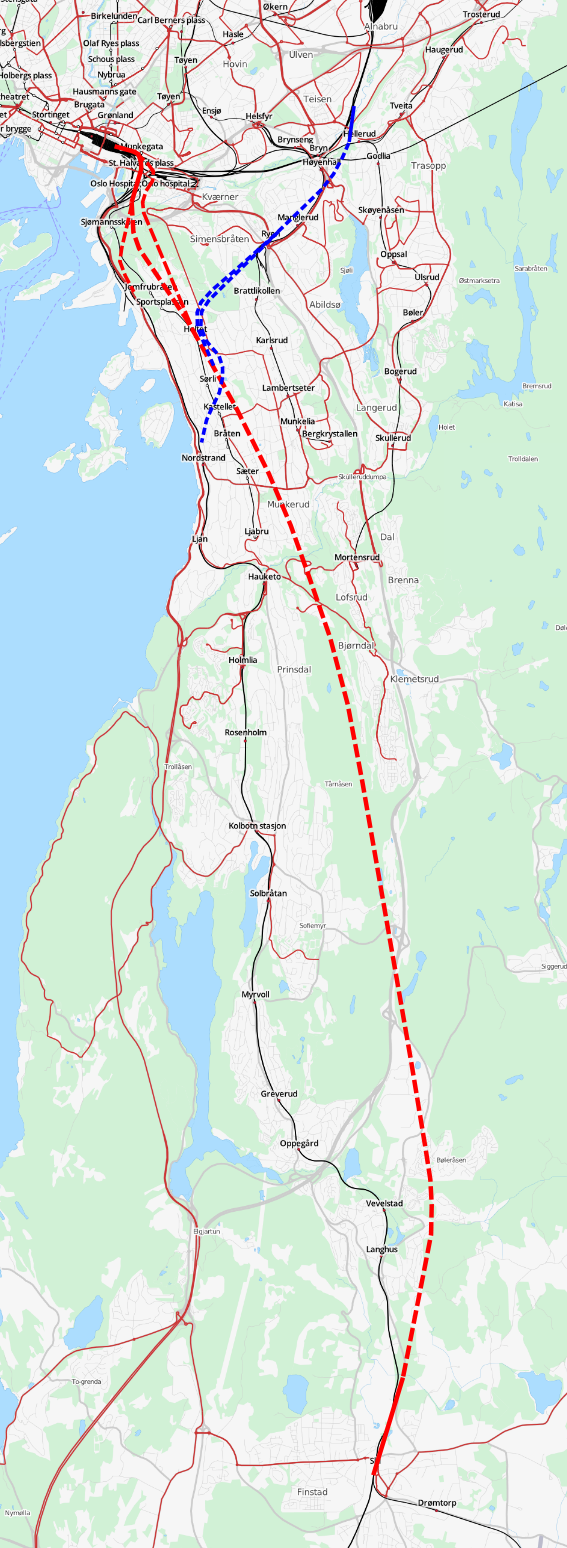
Map of the existing Østfold Line on the left, marked with black line, and the Follo Line on the right, marked with red lines. The proposed connection between the Follo and Østfold Line, and the Trunk and Loenga–Alnabru Line, are marked with blue lines.

The first plans for the Follo Line were launched in 1995, and also included an intermediate station at Vevelstad and Kolbotn. The plans also suggested building the line in two phases, first between Ski and Kolbotn, and then from Kolbotn to Oslo. In 2008, the National Rail Administration announced two possible plans for the right-of-way—both predominantly in tunnel. The one proposal included Kolbotn, the other did not. Both excluded Vevelstad as a station on the new line, since the station could not develop as a hub, and would still keep services along the existing commuter line. A report from Det Norske Veritas published in 2008, and ordered by the Rail Administration, concluded that neither a station at Vevelstad or at Kolbotn could support the extra cost of construction. A direct line with no intermediate stops is estimated to cost NOK 11 billion, while a line via Kolbotn would cost 13.5 billion. The report also argued that the intermediate stops would decrease capacity and increase travel time for all passengers departing south of Ski and traveling north. The exclusion of Kolbotn would also increase the importance of Ski as a regional public transport hub. In 2009, the Rail Administration abandoned the plans to build the line via Kolbotn, stating that it was more important to secure a fast connection to Ski. At the same time, they promised to upgrade the existing station at Kolbotn.

The earliest possible construction was 2014, which could allow completion by 2020/21. Ski Station was rebuilt as part of the project, and was expanded to six tracks. Plans to connect the Eastern Østfold Line to the slower line were considered where the Eastern Østfold Line diverges from the Østfold Line at Ski. However this has changed so the local trains from Eastern Østfold can travel to Oslo faster along the new tracks.

Just south of Oslo Central Station, each of the two tracks diverge, and follow different routes. The inbound track hooks up with the Østfold Line at Sjursøya, while the outbound track diverges at Loenga.

There is a proposal to have additional connection to the Østfold Line to be made at Nordstrand. The Østfold Line will connect to the Trunk Line and Loenga–Alnabru Line before reaching Oslo Central Station (Oslo S). If the Kolbotn-alternative for the Follo Line is chosen, the Østfold Line will be rebuilt to follow a similar path to the Kolbotn station, which will require a new station building to accommodate the two lines. For this alternate route the two lines will enter the Kolbotn station at two levels, with the Follo Line running in a tunnel below, and the Østfold Line running at-grade above.

=== Construction ===
The contractors Acciona from Spain, and Ghella from Italy, jointly signed the contract with the Rail Administration to build the Blix Tunnel in March 2015. The main construction started later same year.

The first two tunnel boring machines (TBM), named Queen Eufemia and Queen Ellisiv, started drilling from Åsland towards Oslo on 6 September 2016 The third TBM, named Anna, and the fourth TBM, named Magda, started drilling from Åsland towards Ski in 7 November and 4 December 2016 respectively.

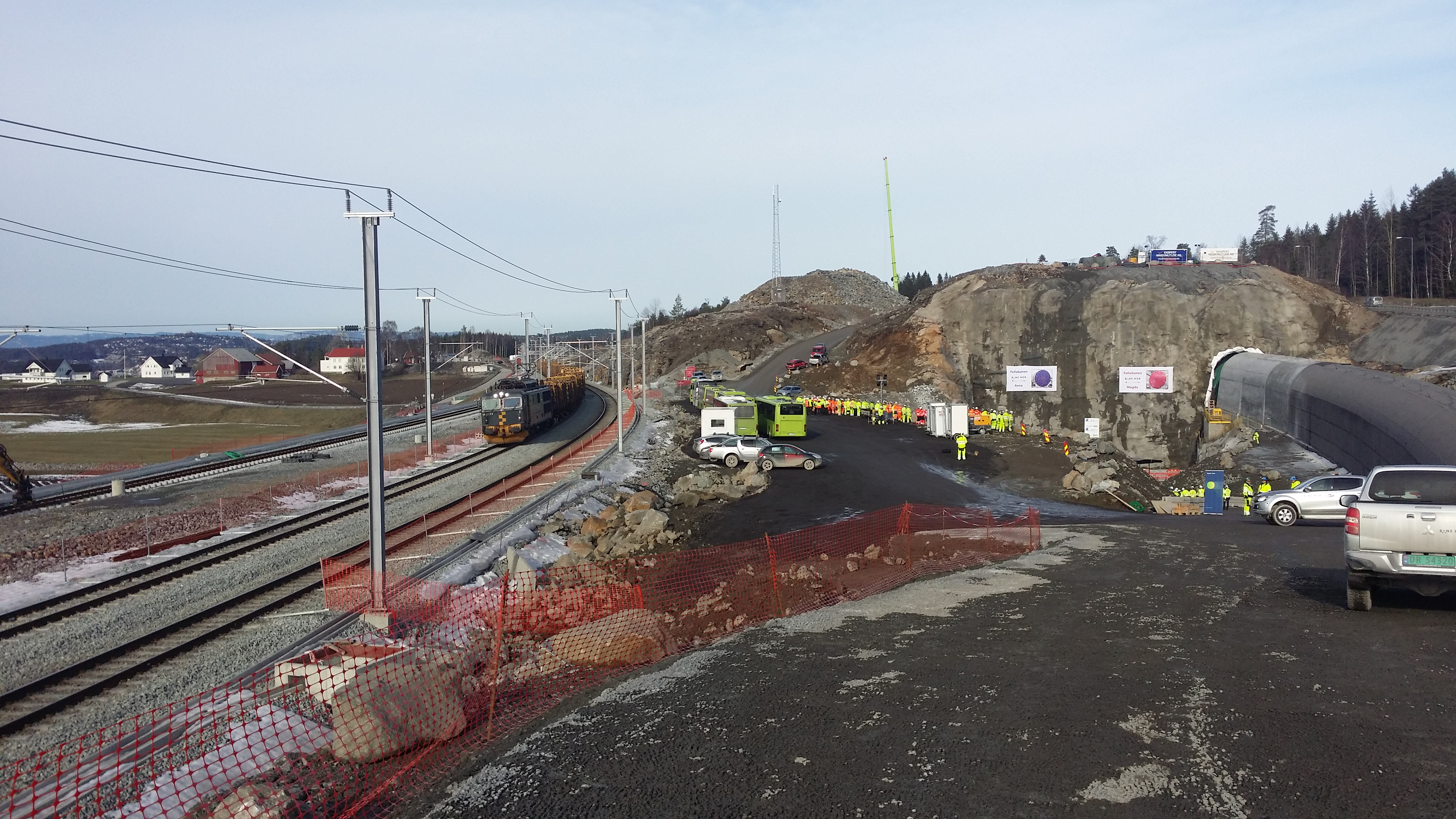
The construction site at Ski on 26 February 2019, where the two TBMs were about to break through

The first two TBMs broke through at Oslo on 11 December 2018, and the last two broke through at Ski on 26 February 2019.

The line was originally planned to be opened in December 2021. However, one of the contractors of the project, Condotte, declared bankruptcy, which delayed the opening to December 2022. The bankruptcy of Condotte costed Bane NOR 1.6 billion Norwegian kroner.

The rail line is dimensioned for at least 250 km/h (155 mph). But due to the signalling system FATC, the actual permitted speed is 200 km/h (125 mph). In future, probably before 2040, the new system ERTMS will be installed allowing higher speed than 200.

=== Opening ===
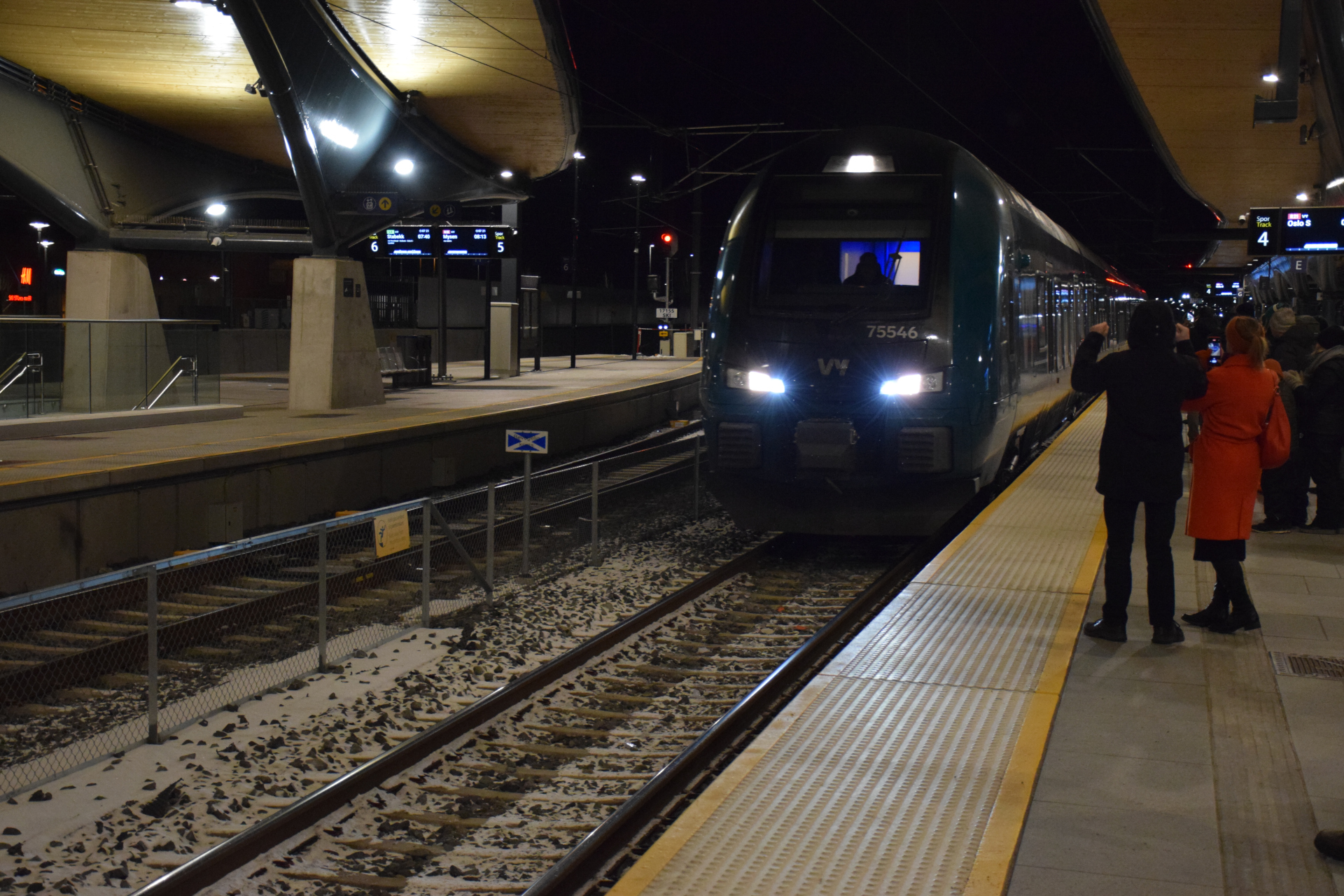
The inaugural passenger train towards Oslo arrived at Ski at 07:21 local time, before it departed at 07:24 on 11 December 2022

In October 2022, Acciona Ghella handed over most of the tunnel to Bane NOR.

The line opened on 11 December 2022 with the inaugural train to Oslo departed from Ski at 07:24 local time. However, a fault in the signalling system occurred later that day, which ordered trains running towards Oslo to run at reduced speed before it was fixed about a quarter-hour later.

On 12 December 2022, the line was formally opened by the King Harald V.

== Impact ==
The Follo Line allows the capacity in the South Corridor from Oslo to increase from about twelve to forty trains per hour. Since the opening, local and freight trains use the Østfold Line, while regional and express trains use the Follo Line. Travel time has been reduced from 22 to 11 minutes. With a new line, it is expected to have 11,000 more public transport trips through the corridor; this includes a 67% increase during rush-hour and 43% the rest of the day. This allows a reduction of 5,800 car trips per day and reduces carbon dioxide emissions of 5,474 tonnes. Rush hour capacity would be eight trains per hour to Kolbotn, with four continuing to Ski along the old line. The new line is served by four trains to Moss, two to Mysen and two to Halden. There would be half the frequency during off-peak hours.

The Østfold Line is the railway that connects Norway to Continental Europe, and 80% of all land-based, international freight transport goes through Østfold. Until the Follo Line opened, there could not have a capacity increase on international freight trains to Norway. The Rail Administration has set a goal of tripling the amount of rail freight by 2040, which for the South Corridor is equal to the removal of 750 trucks per day from European Route E18. The Follo Line also allows freight trains to pass during rush hour.
