= 1940 in rail transport =

This article lists events related to rail transport that occurred in 1940.

== Events ==
=== January events ===
- January 9 – The Østfold Line in Norway takes electric traction into use between Ås and Dilling.
- January 14 – Atchison, Topeka and Santa Fe Railway discontinues the San Francisco-Los Angeles-Chicago Navajo.
- January 27 – The Boston, Revere Beach and Lynn Railroad ceases operations in Massachusetts in preparation for abandonment.
- January 29 – Three gasoline-powered trains carrying factory workers crash and explode while approaching Ajikawaguchi Station, Yumesaki Line (Nishinari Line), Osaka, Japan, killing at least 181 people and injuring at least 92.

=== February events ===
- February – Electro-Motive Corporation introduces the E5.

=== March events ===
- March 29 – Southern Pacific Railroad runs its last passenger train to Fremont-Centerville, California.

=== May events ===
- May 1 – The Østfold Line in Norway takes electric traction into use between Dilling and Fredrikstad.
- May 20 – Sixty-six railroads in the United States, in cooperation with the Travelers' Credit Corporation, begin selling railroad tickets, Pullman accommodations and all-expense tours on an installment basis, known as the Travel Credit Plan. Purchases over $50 can be charged.

=== June events ===
- June 21 – East Wind begins summer service over the Pennsylvania, New Haven, Boston & Maine and Maine Central railroads between Washington, D.C., and Maine.
- June 29 – Syracuse Transit Corporation closes the South Salina and Nedrow lines in Syracuse, New York.
- June 30 – Last day archbar freight trucks can legally operate in U.S. Interchange service (and then only on empty cars returning to their home roads).
- June – Chicago, Rock Island and Pacific Railroad takes delivery of the unique EMC AB6 locomotives.

=== July events ===
- July 1 – Portions of the SNCF in Alsace-Lorraine are incorporated into the Deutsche Reichsbahn.
- July 15 – The Østfold Line in Norway takes electric traction into use between Fredrikstad and Sarpsborg.
- July 17 – The last section of the Baghdad Railway's mainline linking Istanbul and Baghdad is completed between El Yaroubieh and Baiji and the Compagnie Internationale des Wagons-Lits' Taurus Express begins to run throughout between Haydarpaşa Terminal, Istanbul, and Baghdad Central Station.
- July 29 – Rail traffic is suspended in France between French-retained and German-occupied territories.
- July 30 – The Pennsylvania Railroad orders its first 4-4-4-4 T1 duplex-drive steam locomotives. They are expected to be serious competition for diesel power.

=== August events ===
- August 1 – Norwegian State Railways runs first through train on the Flåm Line.

=== September events ===
- September 2 – Kansas City Southern Railway inaugurates the Southern Belle passenger train service between Kansas City, Missouri, and New Orleans, Louisiana.
- September 13 – The Gulf, Mobile and Ohio Railroad is formed by the merger of the Gulf, Mobile and Northern and Mobile and Ohio Railroads.

=== October events ===
- October 1 – The Pennsylvania Turnpike opens, constructed using tunnels and grades originally built for the never-completed South Pennsylvania Railroad.

=== November events ===
- November 4 – Norton Fitzwarren, England: a train driver on the Great Western Railway misreads the signals on a four track line, and drives his train off the end of the track.
- November 11
  - The Østfold Line in Norway takes electric traction into use between Sarpsborg and Halden.
  - Syracuse Transit Corporation closes the Elm Street line in Syracuse, New York.
- November 22 – The Newark City Subway in New Jersey opens an extension from Heller Parkway to Grove Street.

=== December ===
- December 15 – The IND Sixth Avenue Line of the New York City Subway is completed and opened throughout.
- December 17 – The Florida East Coast Railway introduces the Dixie Flagler passenger train between Chicago, Illinois and Miami, Florida, replacing the Henry M. Flagler.

== Deaths ==
=== September deaths ===
- September 23 – Hale Holden, president of Chicago, Burlington and Quincy Railroad 1914–1918 and 1920–1929, chairman of the board of directors for Southern Pacific Railroad 1932–1939, dies (b. 1869).

=== October deaths ===
- October 24 – William Benson Storey, president of Atchison, Topeka and Santa Fe Railway 1920–1933 (born 1857).

=== November deaths ===
- November 9 – Charles Langbridge Morgan, chief engineer for London, Brighton and South Coast Railway, dies (b. 1855).

=== Unknown date deaths ===
- Leonor F. Loree, president of Baltimore and Ohio Railroad 1901–1903, Delaware and Hudson Railway 1907–1938 and Kansas City Southern Railway 1918–1920 (born 1858).
