= Kværner (disambiguation) =

Kværner may refer to:

- Kværner, a former Norwegian heavy industry company
- Aker Solutions, formerly known as Aker Kværner
- Kværner, Norway, a neighborhood in Oslo
- Kværnerbyen, a neighborhood in Oslo
- Kværner Station on the Gjøvik Line
