= Borgestad =

Borgestad may refer to:

- Borgestad (Skien), a tettbebyggelse (agglomeration) in the municipality of Skien, Telemark, Norway
  - Borgestad Manor, an estate and manor house
  - Borgestad Station, a former train station
- Borgestad (company), a Norwegian shipping, industry and real estate company
