= Hafslund Line =

Abandoned railway line in Norway

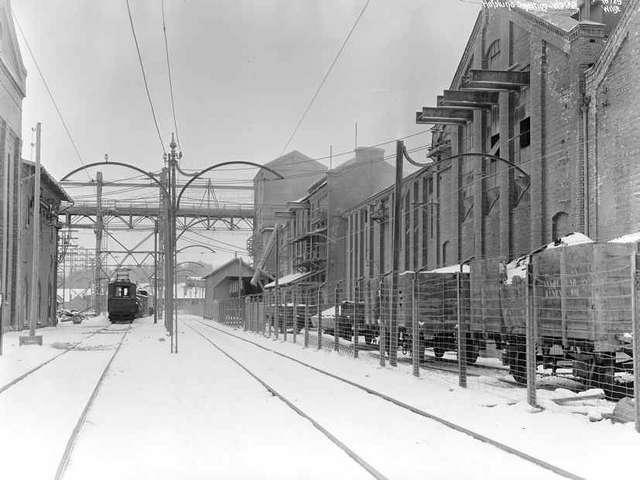
- Hafslund karbidfabrikk

Overview
- Status: Abandoned
- Owner: Halfslund
- Termini: Hafslund Station; Sundløkka

Service
- Type: Industrial railway
- System: Halfslund
- Operator(s): Hafslund Smelteverk

History
- Opened: 1898
- Closed: 1973

Technical
- Line length: 5.5 km
- Number of tracks: Single
- Character: Freight
- Track gauge: 1,435 mm (4 ft 8 1/2 in)
- Electrification: 600 V DC

The Hafslund Line (Norwegian: Hafslundbanen) is an abandoned railway line between Hafslund and Sundløkka in Sarpsborg, Norway. The line was a branch line of the Østfold Line and opened in 1898. It was closed in 1973 and was used by Hafslund Smelteverk for industrial transport to its plant and to the port at Sundløkka. The line was electrified at 600 V DC. The 2 km line from the plant to the port was closed in 1967 while the rest of the line closed six years later. One locomotive is preserved at the Krøder Line.
