= Dilling Station =

Railway station in Moss, Norway

Dilling
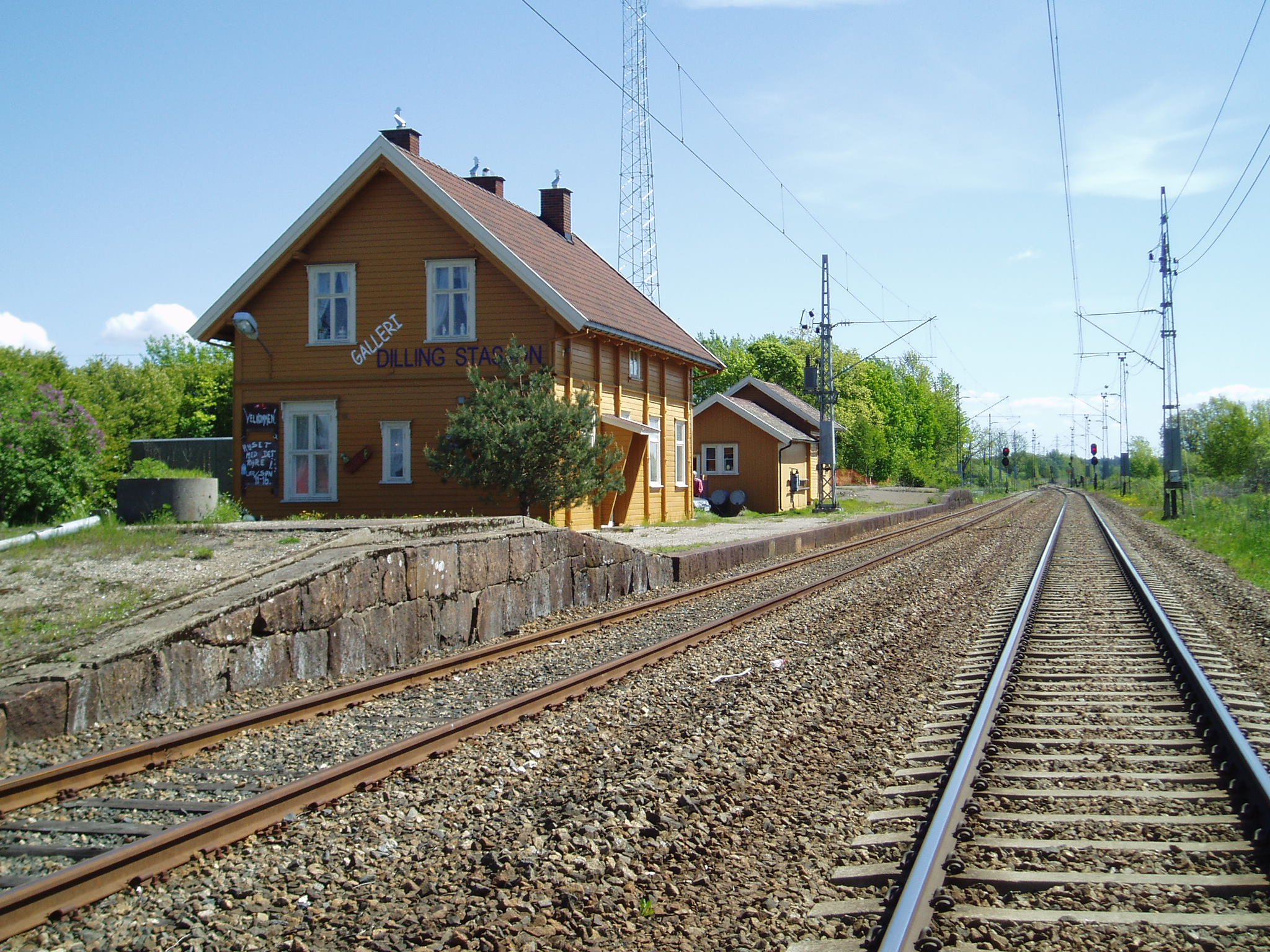

General information
- Location: Dilling, Rygge; Norway
- Coordinates: 59.39810°N 10.69417°E
- Elevation: 27.0 m (88.6 ft)
- Owner: Norwegian State Railways
- Line: Østfold Line
- Distance: 65.34 km (40.60 mi)

Construction
- Architect: Peter Andreas Blix

History
- Opened: 2 January 1879
- Closed: 1983
Location

Dilling Station (Norwegian: Dilling stasjon) is a former railway station on the Østfold Line, located at Dilling in Rygge, Norway. Since 1983, it is no longer used for passenger transport. The distance from Dilling station to Oslo is 65.34 kilometres.

Preceding station		Following station
Moss; Feste	Østfold Line	Rygge; Bjølsen
