= Fredrikstad Station =

Railway station in Fredrikstad, Norway

Fredrikstad
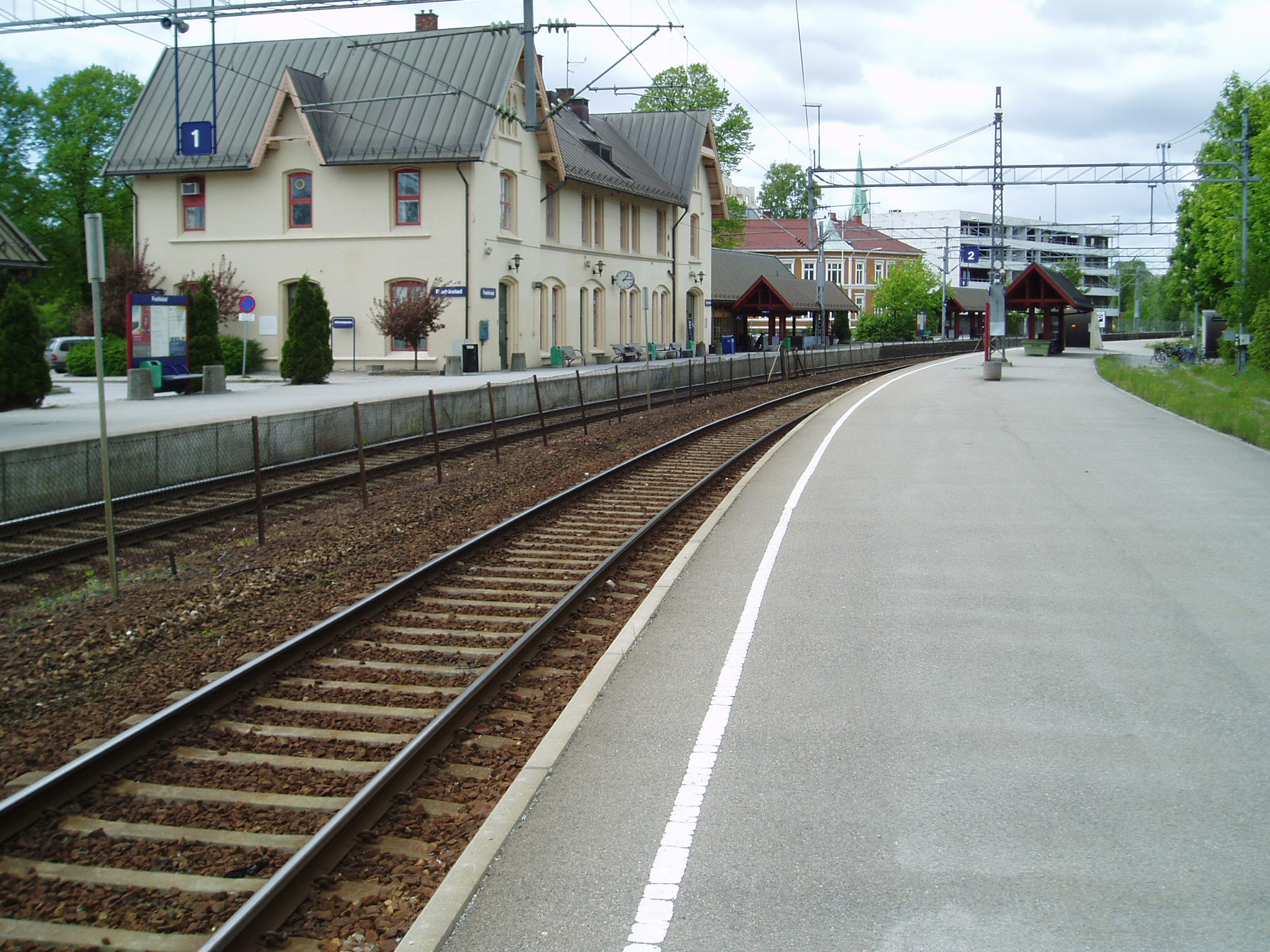

General information
- Location: Fredrikstad, Norway
- Coordinates: 59°12′32″N 10°57′02″E
- Elevation: 7.5 m (25 ft) AMSL
- Owner: Bane NOR
- Operator: Vy
- Line: Østfold Line
- Distance: 94.26 km (58.57 mi)
- Platforms: 2

Other information
- Station code: FRE

History
- Opened: 1879
Location

Fredrikstad Station (Norwegian: Fredrikstad stasjon) is a railway station located at the city of Fredrikstad in Norway on the Østfold Line. It is located about 200 meters (660 ft) from Fredrikstad Hospital. The station is served by regional trains between Oslo and Halden with hourly headway by Vy.

== History ==
The station was opened in 1879 as part of the Østfold Line. A restaurant was established by Norsk Spisevognselskap on 1 January 1948.

Preceding station	Regional trains	Following station
Råde towards Oslo S	RE20	Sarpsborg towards Halden or Göteborg C
