= Fåberg Station =

Railway station in Lillehammer, Norway

Fåberg
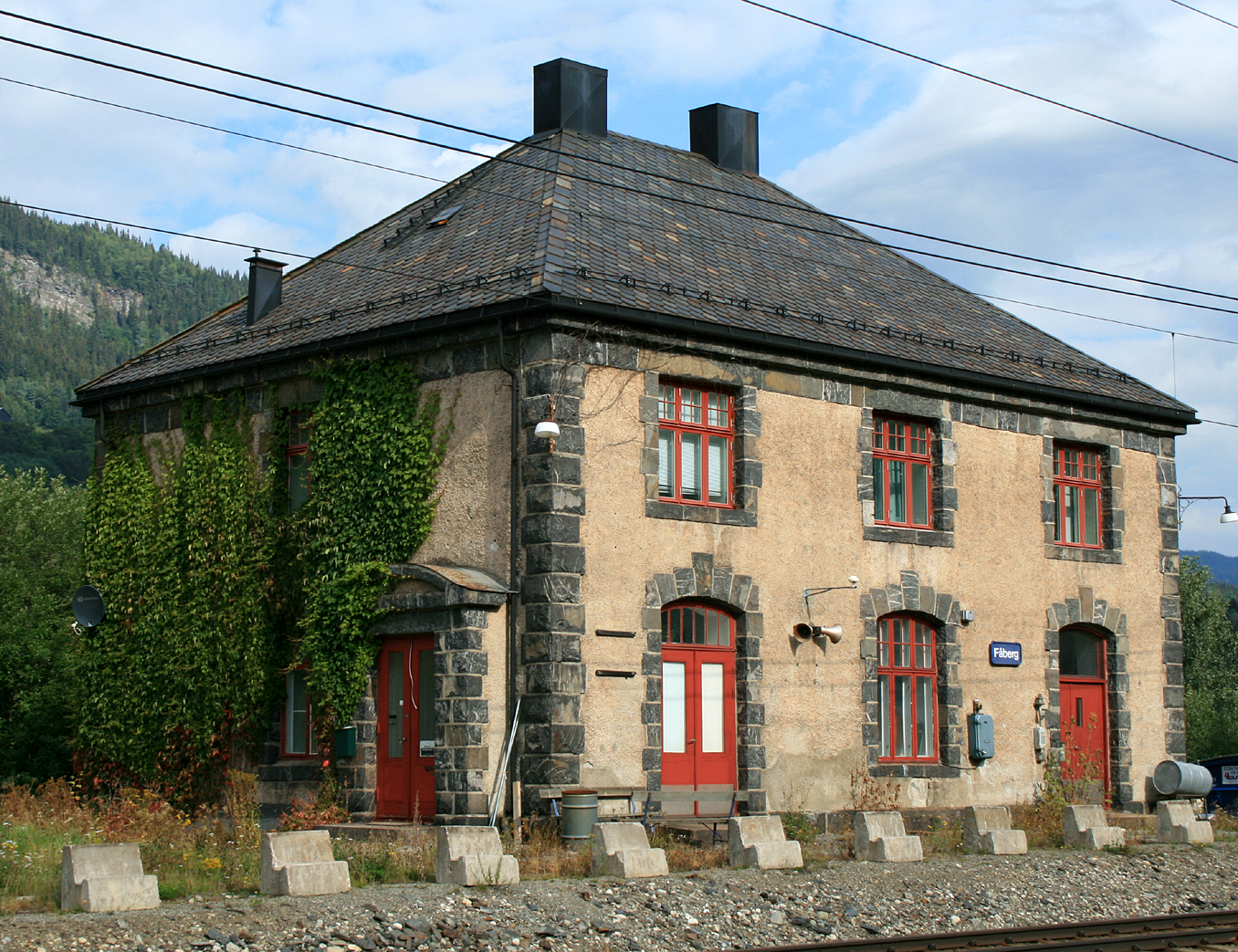

General information
- Location: Fåberg, Lillehammer Municipality; Norway
- Coordinates: 61.169°N 10.405°E
- Elevation: 147.7 m (485 ft)
- Owner: Norwegian State Railways
- Line: Dovre Line
- Distance: 65.34 km (40.60 mi)

History
- Opened: 15 November 1894
Location

Fåberg Station (Norwegian: Fåberg stasjon) is a former railway station on the Dovre Line, located at Fåberg in Lillehammer Municipality, Norway. Until 1924, it was spelled Faaberg.

Preceding station		Following station
Lillehammer; Sundgården	Dovre Line	Hunderfossen; Smedstua
