= Eikonrød Station =

Former railway station in Skien, Norway

Eikonrød
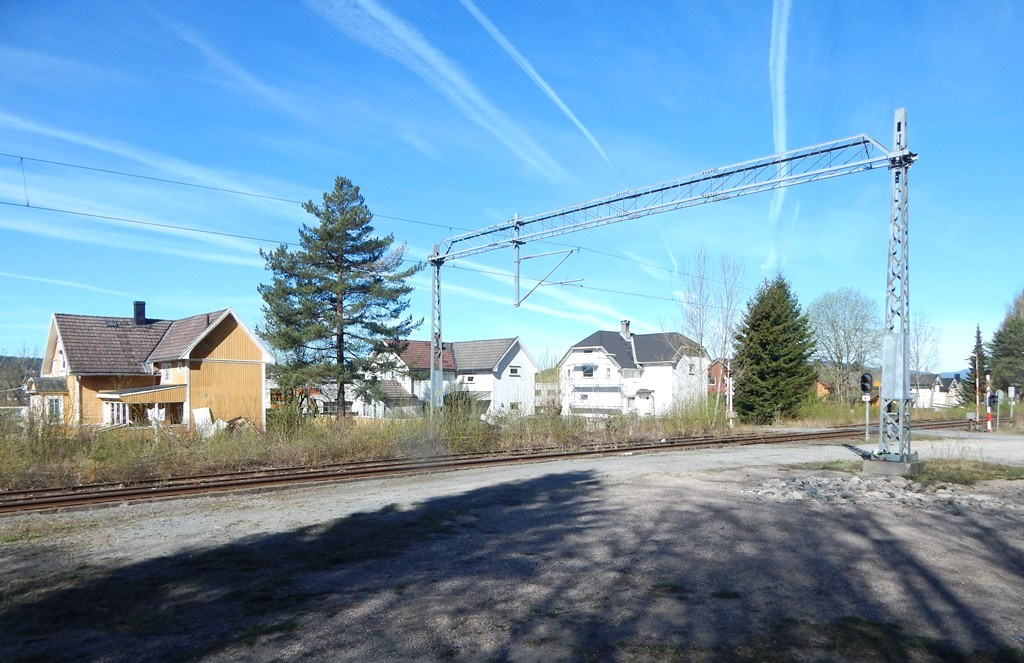

General information
- Location: Eikonrød, Skien; Norway
- Coordinates: 59.1898°N 9.6255°E
- Elevation: 17.2 m (56 ft)
- Owner: Norwegian State Railways
- Line: Vestfold Line
- Distance: 183.84 km (114.23 mi)

History
- Opened: 11 November 1916
Location

Eikonrød Station (Norwegian: Eikonrød stasjon) is a former railway station on the Vestfold Line, located at Eikonrød in Skien, Norway.

Preceding station		Following station
Skien	Vestfold Line	Porsgrunn; Borgestad
