= Borgestad Station =

Railway station in Skien, Norway

Borgestad
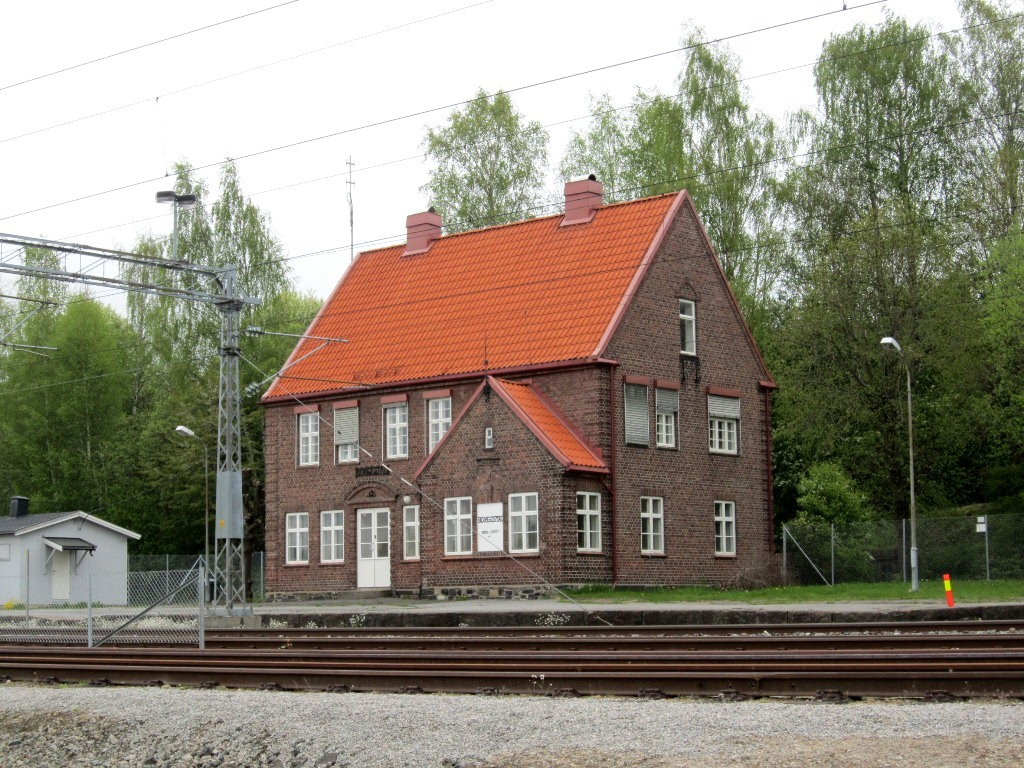
- Borgestad station

General information
- Location: Borgestad, Skien; Norway
- Coordinates: 59.39810°N 10.69417°E
- Elevation: 10.4 m (34 ft)
- Owner: Norwegian State Railways
- Line: Vestfold Line
- Distance: 186.80 km (116.07 mi)

History
- Opened: 4 December 1916
- Closed: 11 June 2006
Location

Borgestad Station (Norwegian: Borgestad stasjon) is a former railway station on the Vestfold Line, located at Borgestad in Skien, Norway. It was previously regarded as part of the Bratsberg Line and open as Menstad. In 2004, there were no more train stops at the station, but on 10 January 2005 it was reopened for passenger traffic. However, the traffic base was too weak and on 11 June 2006 the Borgestad station stopped receiving trains.

Preceding station		Following station
Skien; Eikonrød	Vestfold Line	Porsgrunn
