= Kværner Station =

Railway station in Oslo, Norway

Kværner

General information
- Location: Kværner, Oslo; Norway
- Coordinates: 59.9076°N 10.7950°E
- Owner: Norwegian State Railways
- Line: Gjøvik Line
- Distance: 2.17 km (1.35 mi)

History
- Opened: 4 December 1958
- Closed: 26 September 1977
Location

Kværner Station (Norwegian: Kværner stasjon) is a former railway station on the Gjøvik Line, located at Kværner in Oslo, Norway.

On Kvaerner station was a small station building, which was sold to the Urskog–Høland Line, and in 1973 relocated to Bingsfoss station.

Preceding station		Following station
Oslo S	Gjøvik Line	Tøyen
