= Sarpsborg Station =

Railway station in Sarpsborg, Norway

Sarpsborg
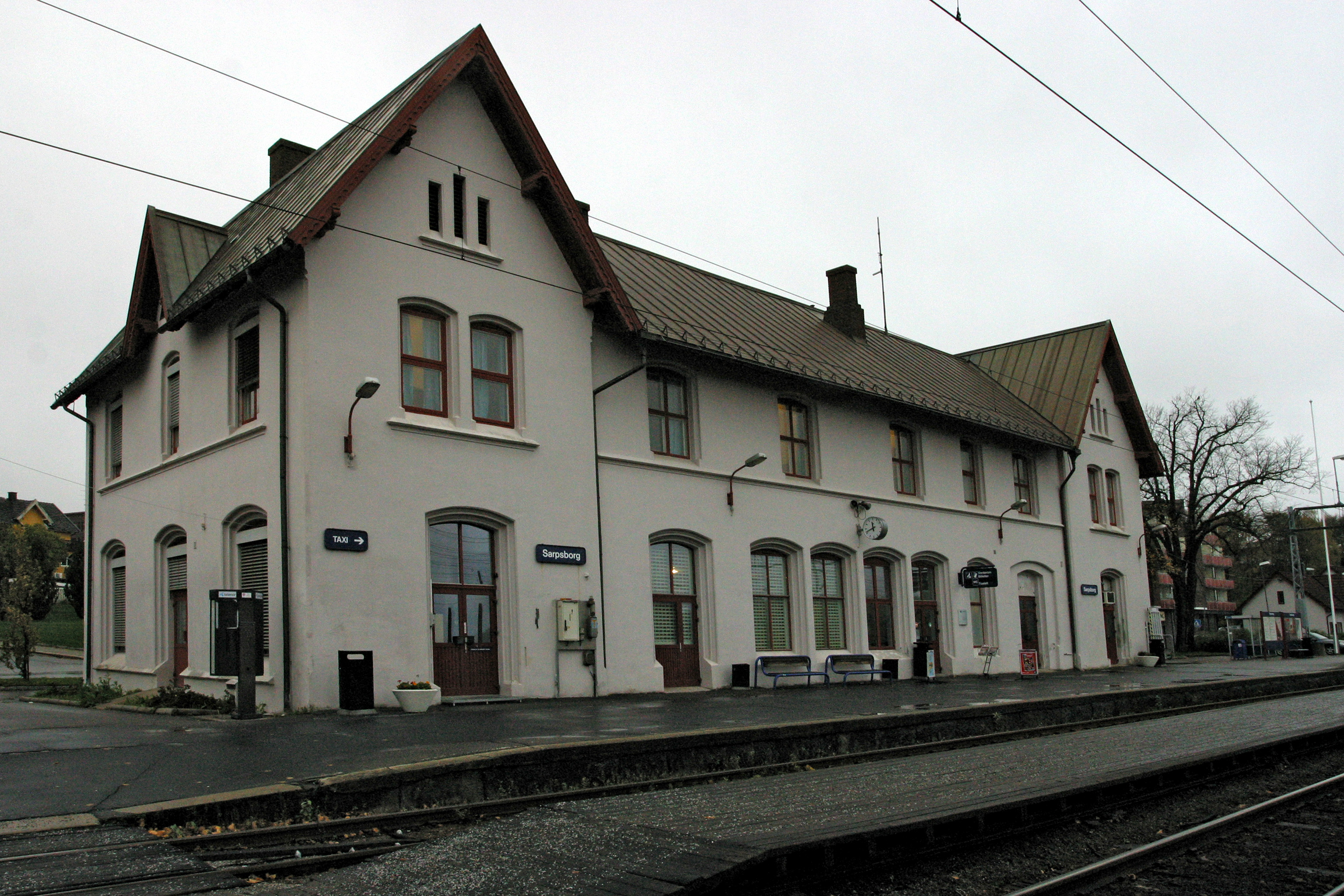

General information
- Location: Sarpsborg, Norway
- Coordinates: 59°17′10″N 11°07′06″E
- Elevation: 37.7 m (124 ft)
- Owner: Bane NOR
- Operator: Vy
- Lines: Østfold Line; Eastern Østfold Line
- Distance: 109.47 km
- Platforms: 2
- Connections: Bus: Østfold Kollektivtrafikk

Other information
- Station code: SBO

History
- Opened: 1879
Location

Sarpsborg Station (Norwegian: Sarpsborg stasjon) is located at the city of Sarpsborg in Norway on the Østfold Line. The station is served by regional trains between Oslo and Halden with hourly headway by Vy.

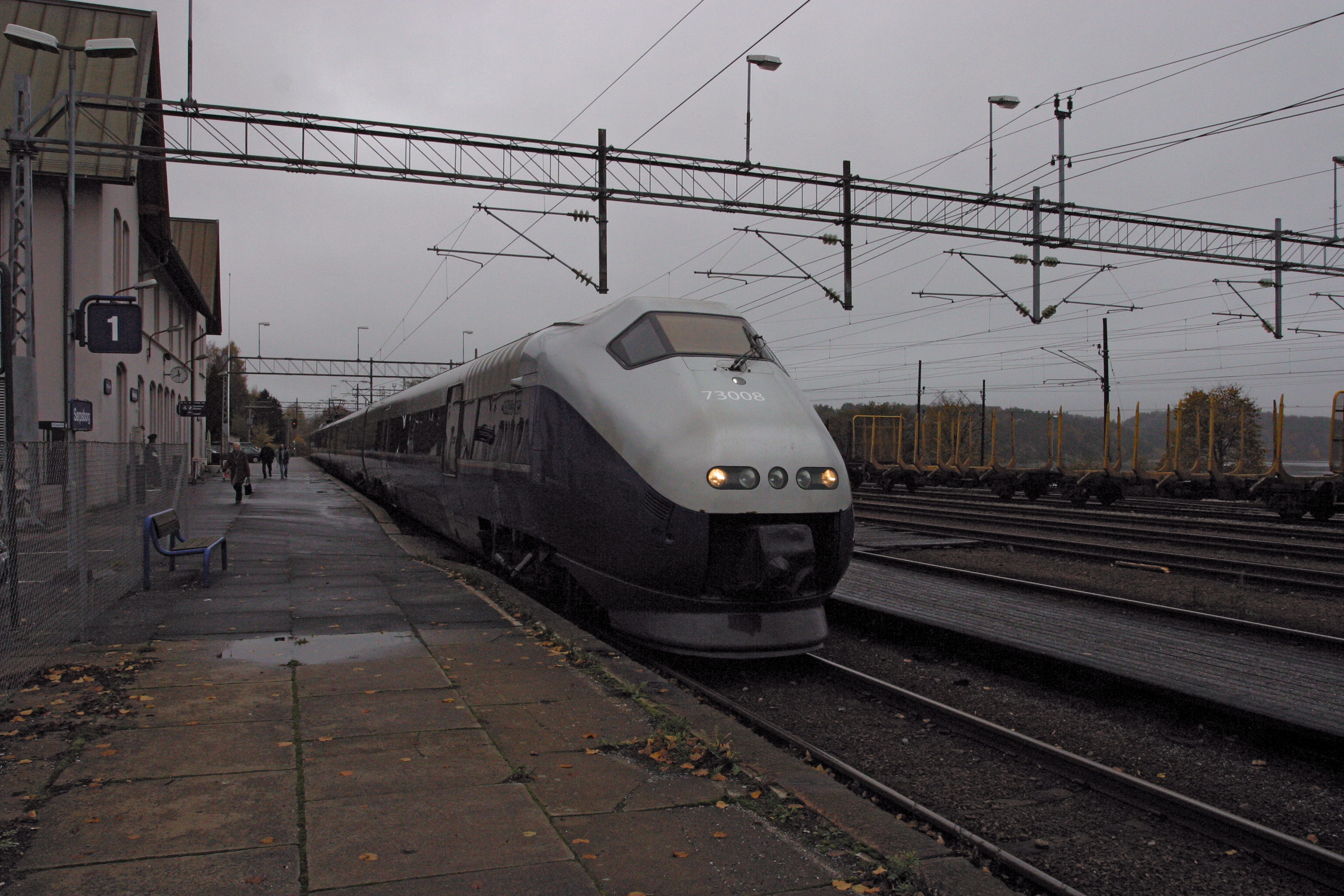
NSB BM73 train to Oslo S ready for departure

== History ==
The station was opened in 1879 as part of the Østfold line. In 1882 the Eastern Østfold Line was built with terminus at Sarpsborg Station.

Preceding station	Regional trains	Following station
Fredrikstad towards Oslo S	RE20	Halden towards Halden or Göteborg C
