= Halden Station =

Railway station in Halden, Norway

Halden
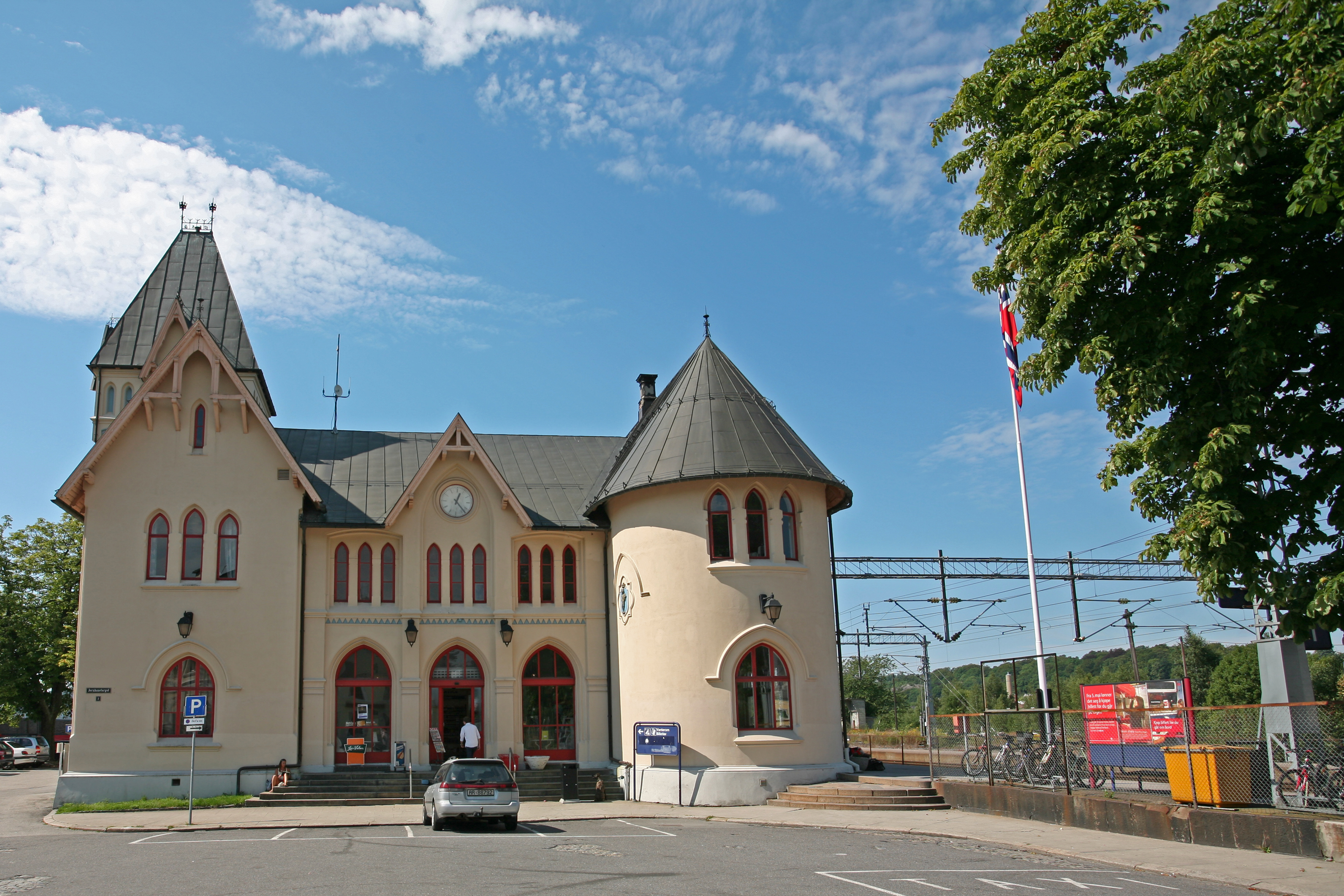

General information
- Location: Halden, Norway
- Coordinates: 59°07′13″N 11°23′03″E
- Elevation: 2.8 m (9 ft 2 in) AMSL
- Owner: Bane NOR
- Operator: Bane NOR
- Line: Østfold Line
- Distance: 136.64 km (84.90 mi)
- Platforms: Low boarding, with step up to the train
- Tracks: 23 (total); 3 (platform)
- Train operators: Vy
- Bus routes: City bus: 32, 33, 34, 35; Regional: 111, 300, 301, 302, 303, 304, 305, 306, 630, 631, 632, 633, 634
- Connections: Bus: Østfold Kollektivtrafikk, Västtrafik

Construction
- Structure type: At-grade
- Parking: 251 spaces
- Cycle facilities: 12 spaces
- Accessible: Yes, track crossed at grade.
- Architect: Peter Andreas Blix

Other information
- Station code: HLD

History
- Opened: 1879
Location

Halden Station (Norwegian: Halden stasjon) is a railway station located in downtown Halden in Østfold, Norway, located on the Østfold Line. The station is served by Vy on an hourly or semi-hourly service from Oslo Central Station, with Halden being the terminal station for roughly half of the RE20 trains. There is one train every two hours to and from Gothenburg. The station is also served by city and regional buses which run from the nearby Halden Bussterminal. The station was opened in 1879 as part of the Østfold Line.

The restaurant was taken over by Norsk Spisevognselskap on 1 January 1921, but then leased out to remain under the company's control. Three years later, the company again started operating the restaurant.

The main type of train to serve this station is the BM74 but on occasion you can also find the BM73.

As of December 2022 trains to Gothenburg run every two hours instead of three times per day.

== Facilities ==
- Waiting room which is open 04:45-21:00 on weekdays and 06:00-21:00 on weekends.
- Ticket machine in the waiting room. Accepts coins, bills and payment cards.
- Cafe which is open 07-09 and 14-18 on weekdays, 08-10 on Saturdays and closed on Sundays.
- Parking, 251 spaces.

Preceding station	Regional trains	Following station
Sarpsborg towards Oslo S	RE20	Terminus
Sarpsborg towards Oslo S	RE20	Ed Limited service towards Göteborg C
