= Skotbu Station =

Railway station in Ski, Norway

Skotbu
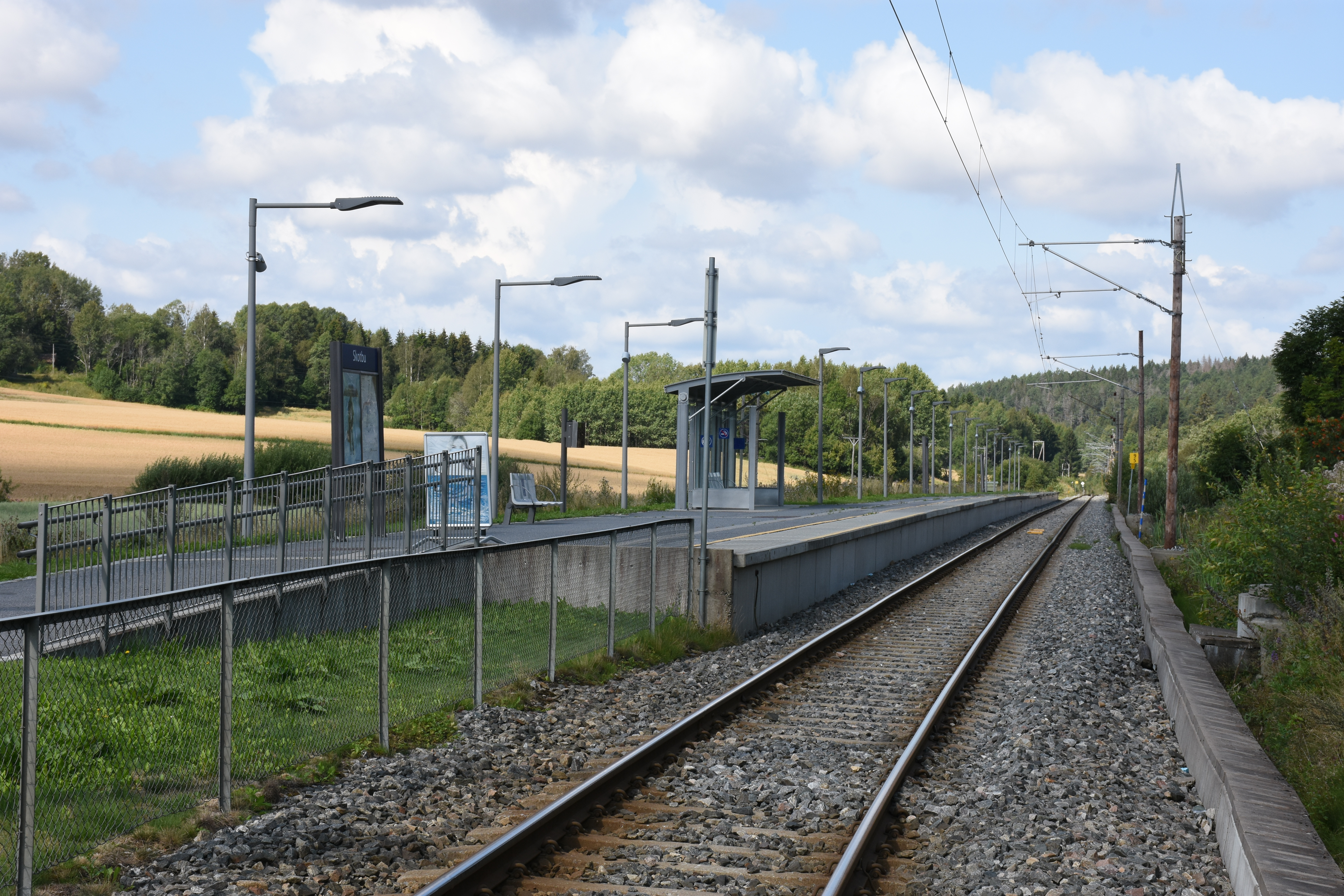

General information
- Location: Skotbu, Ski; Norway
- Coordinates: 59°39′54″N 10°56′51″E
- Elevation: 129 m (423 ft) AMSL
- Owner: Bane NOR
- Operator: Vy
- Line: Eastern Østfold Line
- Distance: 34.09 km (21.18 mi)
- Platforms: 1 side platform
- Tracks: 1

Construction
- Parking: 20 places
- Cycle facilities: Yes

History
- Opened: 1 March 1908

Passengers
- 2012: 66,000 (annual boarding and disembarking)
Location
- Location within Akershus

Skotbu Station (Norwegian: Skotbu holdeplass) is a railway station located at Skotbu in Ski, Norway. Situated 34.09 kilometers (21.18 mi) from Oslo Central Station (Oslo S), it is served hourly by the L22 service of Vy's Oslo Commuter Rail. The station opened on 1 March 1908, after the local community had pledged to finance a new station. The station received a revamp in 2014. The station had 66,000 boarding and disembarking passengers in 2012.

== History ==
The Eastern Østfold Line opened in 1882, with the Skotbu population forced to use either Kråkstad Station or Tomter Station. A station at Skotbu was permitted built by the Norwegian State Railways after the local population had offered to finance the stop. Originally named Skodbo, the station opened on 1 March 1908. It lacked a passing loop and was only staffed to handle passengers and cargo. The station had 1,382 boarding passengers, not including month pass holders, in 1910. This increased to 3,404 five years later. The numbers were nearly twice this during the 1920s, with 7,377 in 1925, but then fell to 5,869 in 1928.

The station changed its name to Skotbu on 1 February 1926. The original station building at Skotbu was demolished and a new building built about 1927. The line was electrified on 5 December 1958. This allowed for the retirement of steam locomotives and the closing of the roundhouse. At the same time direct services to the capital were reintroduced. The station became unstaffed from 17 March 1969.

Skotbu Station underwent a full platform renovation in 2014. The old wooden platform was only 38 centimeters (15 in) tall and in need of replacement. The platform was moved 50 meters (160 ft) west and was lengthened to 220 meters (720 ft). This cost 17.7 million Norwegian kroner, including a similar job at Knapstad Station.

== Facilities ==
Skotbu Station is situated on the Eastern Østfold Line, 9.68 kilometers (6.01 mi) from Ski Station and 34.09 kilometers (21.18 mi) from Oslo S, at an elevation of 129 meters (423 ft) above mean sea level. The station has a side platform which is 220 meters (720 ft) long and 76 centimeters (30 in) tall. There are platform shelters but no ticket sale at the station. There is a bicycle rack and about 20 parking spaces for cars. There is a level crossing just east of the platforms.

The station mostly serves the village of Skotbu. There are 420 residents within a 1-kilometer (0.62 mi) radius of the station. Despite the low population, the train service has been retained as there is no other public transit for the village, and it would be difficult to establish a bus service to Skotbu.

== Service ==
Skotbu is served with hourly L22 trains operated by Vy's Oslo Commuter Rail. The run from Oslo via Ski and Skotbu to Mysen or Rakkestad. Travel time is 33 minutes to Oslo S, 10 minutes to Ski and 31 minutes to Mysen. The trains continue onward from Oslo along the Drammen Line terminating at Skøyen Station. The station had 66,000 daily boarding and disembarking passengers in 2012.

== Bibliography ==
- Bjerke, Thor; Holom, Finn (2004). Banedata 2004 (in Norwegian). Hamar / Oslo: Norwegian Railway Museum / Norwegian Railway Club. ISBN 82-90286-28-7.
- Langård, Geir-Widar; Ruud, Leif-Harald (2005). Sydbaneracer og Skandiapil – Glimt fra Østfoldbanen gjennom 125 år (in Norwegian). Oslo: Norwegian Railway Club. ISBN 978-82-90286-29-8.
- Magnus, Bi Five (1993). Kom, så skaper vi et kulturminne! (in Norwegian). Oslo: University of Oslo.
- Østlid, Martin (1929). Kråkstad – en bygdebok (in Norwegian). Vol. 1. Kråkstad: Komitéen.

Preceding station			Following station
Kråkstad; Langli	Eastern Østfold Line		Tomter
Preceding station	Local trains		Following station
Kråkstad	R22	Oslo S–Mysen	Tomter
