= Greverud Station =

Railway station in Nordre Follo, Norway

Greverud
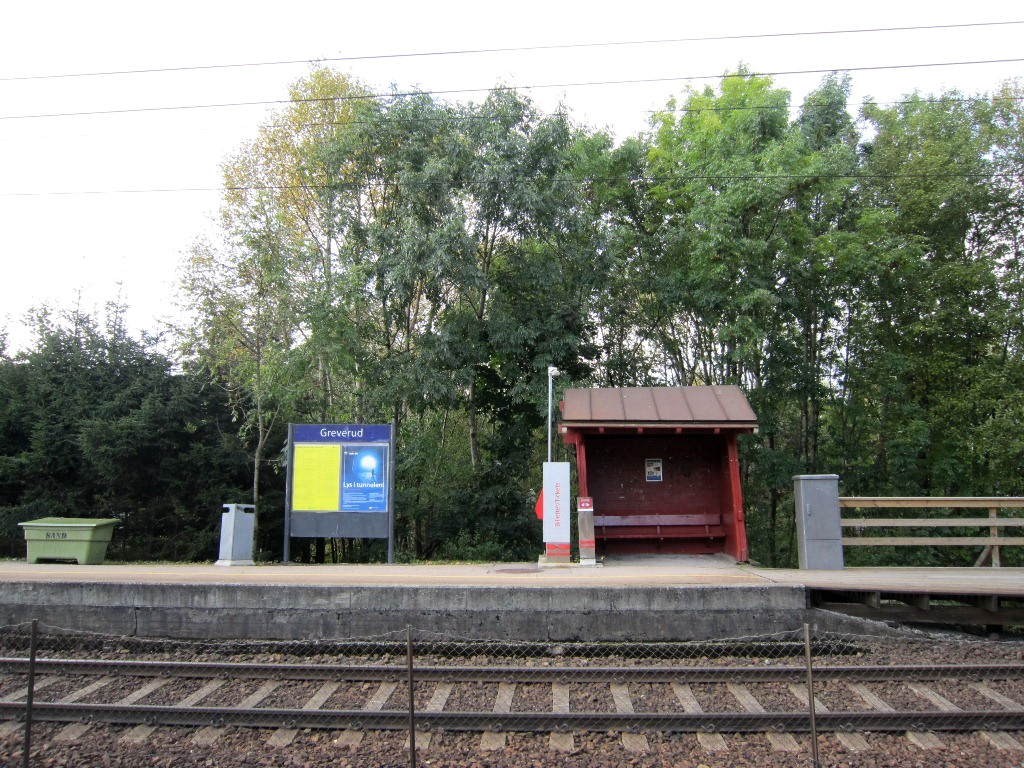

General information
- Location: Greverud, Oppegård; Norway
- Coordinates: 59°46′22″N 10°48′24″E
- Owner: Bane NOR
- Operator: Vy
- Line: Østfold Line
- Distance: 17.36 km
- Platforms: 2

History
- Opened: 1939
Location

Greverud Station (Norwegian: Greverud holdeplass) is a railway station at Greverud in Oppegård, Norway. Located on the Østfold Line it is served by the Oslo Commuter Rail line L2 operated by Vy with two hourly services. The station was opened in 1919.

Preceding station			Following station
Myrvoll	Østfold Line		Oppegård
Preceding station	Local trains		Following station
Myrvoll	L2	Stabekk–Oslo S–Ski	Oppegård
