= Hanna Adolfsen =

Norwegian politician and women's activist

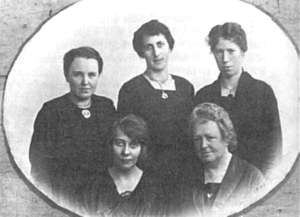
Hanna Adolfsen (bottom right) with colleagues Klara Bakken, Helga Karlsen, Thina Thorleifsen and Sigrid Syvertsen

Hanna Adolfsen (1872–1926) was a Norwegian politician who was active in the women's movement. From 1920 to 1923, she headed the Norwegian Labour Party's Women's Federation (Arbeiderpartiets kvindeforbund), taking a more radical stand than her predecessors Gunhild Ziener and Martha Tynæs by supporting dictatorship of the proletariat and socialization in line with trends in Moscow.

== Biography ==
Originally from Røyken, Adolfsen first became active in the seamsters' association in Christiania where she served as both chairman and treasurer. In 1917, she became secretary of the Norwegian Tailors Association (Norsk Skrædderforbund), where she was appointed treasurer in 1920. In addition to becoming a board member of Kvinnenes kontor (The Women's Office) from its establishment in 1909, she served on Oslo's city council where she worked on hospitals and social care. Adolfsen was elected chair of the Labour Party's Women's Federation after a dramatic confrontation with the less radical former chairman Gunhild Ziener. Under her leadership, the Federation's membership decreased from some 4,000 to 3,000 but later began to rise again. As a result of pressure from Moscow, at the 1923 national congress, the Federation became an arm of the Labour Party itself where it was known as Arbeiderpartiets kvinnesekretariat (The Labour Party's Women's Secretariat). It was first headed by Thina Thorleifsen.

Hanna Adolfsen died from an illness in 1926.
