= Myrvoll Station =

Railway station in Nordre Follo, Norway

Myrvoll
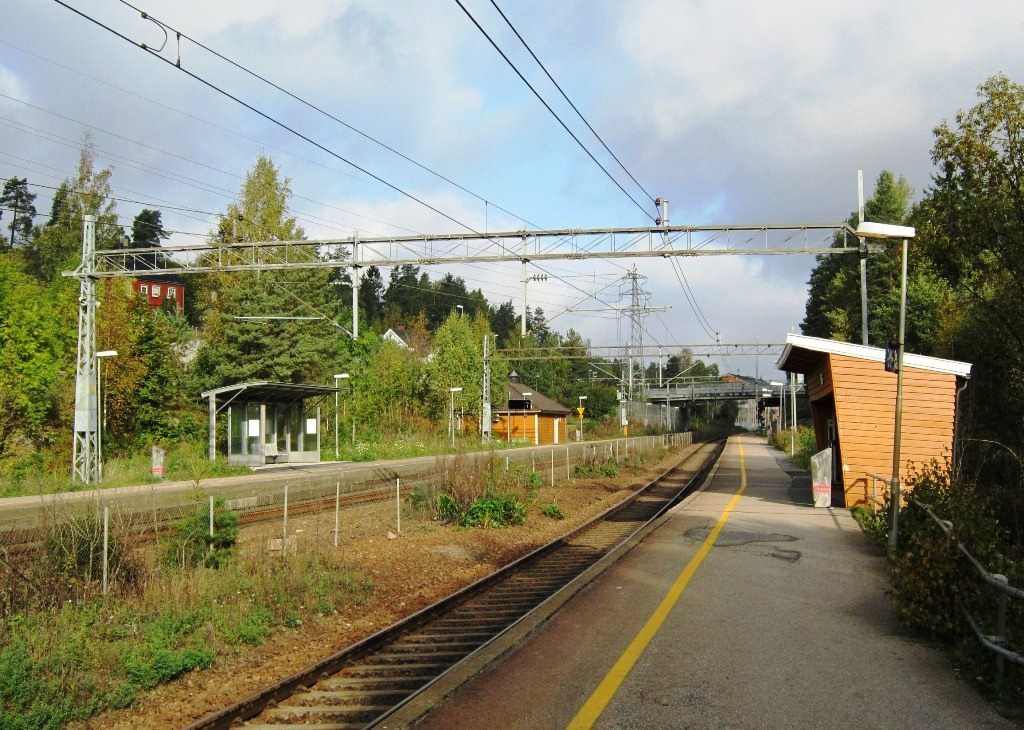
- Myrvoll station (2011)

General information
- Location: Myrvoll, Oppegård; Norway
- Coordinates: 59°47′09″N 10°48′03″E
- Owner: Bane NOR
- Operator: Vy
- Line: Østfold Line
- Distance: 15.72 km
- Platforms: 2

History
- Opened: 1919
Location

Myrvoll Station (Norwegian: Myrvoll stasjon) is a railway station at Myrvoll in Oppegård, Norway. Located on the Østfold Line, it is served by the Oslo Commuter Rail line L2 operated by Vy with two hourly services. The station was opened in 1919.

Preceding station			Following station
Solbråtan	Østfold Line		Greverud
Preceding station	Local trains		Following station
Solbråtan	L2	Stabekk–Oslo S–Ski	Greverud
