= Kråkstad Station =

Railway station in Ski, Norway

Kråkstad
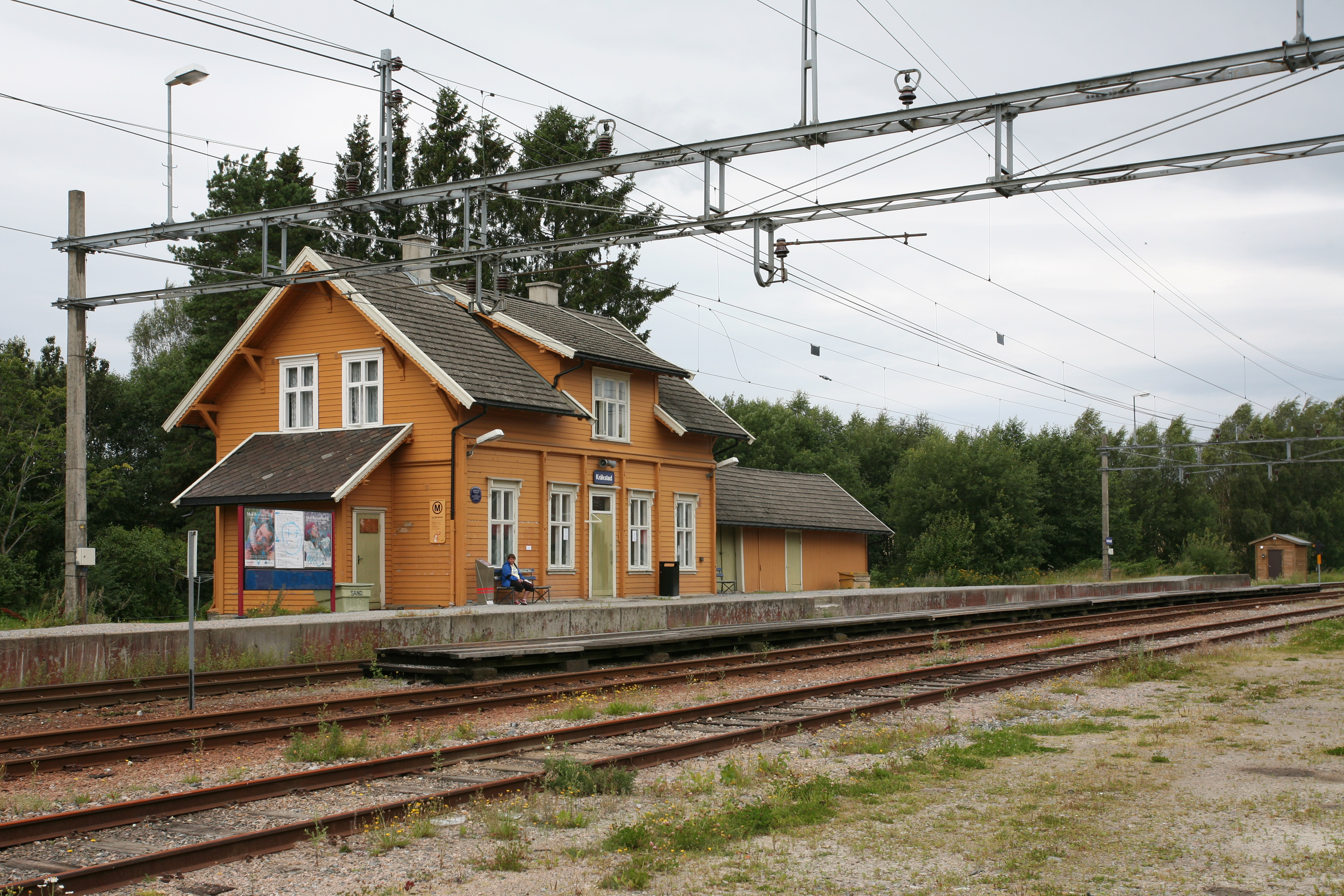

General information
- Location: Kråkstad, Ski; Norway
- Coordinates: 59°41′01″N 10°53′27″E
- Elevation: 92.8 m (304 ft) AMSL
- Owner: Bane NOR
- Operator: Vy
- Line: Eastern Østfold Line
- Distance: 30.09 km (18.70 mi) from Oslo S
- Platforms: 2 side platforms
- Tracks: 3

History
- Opened: 24 November 1882

Passengers
- 2012: 92,000 (annual boarding and disembarking)
Location
- Location within Akershus

Kråkstad Station (Norwegian: Kråkstad stasjon) is a railway station located at Kråkstad in Ski, Norway. Situated 30.09 kilometers (18.70 mi) from Oslo Central Station (Oslo S), it is served hourly by the L22 service of Vy's Oslo Commuter Rail. The station opened on 24 November 1882 with a station building designed by Balthazar Lange in Swiss chalet style. It has been listed as a cultural heritage site. The station received a revamp in 2014. The station had 92,000 boarding and disembarking passengers in 2012.

== History ==
During the planning of the Østfold Line there were two proposals for how the Eastern Line would branch off. The one called for a branch at Ås Station and then heading due east from there. The other was branching off at Ski Station. The municipal council in Kråkstad supported the later, which was ultimately chosen. Kraakstad Municipality bought shares worth 2,000 Norwegian speciedaler in the railway. The station and line opened on 24 November 1882.

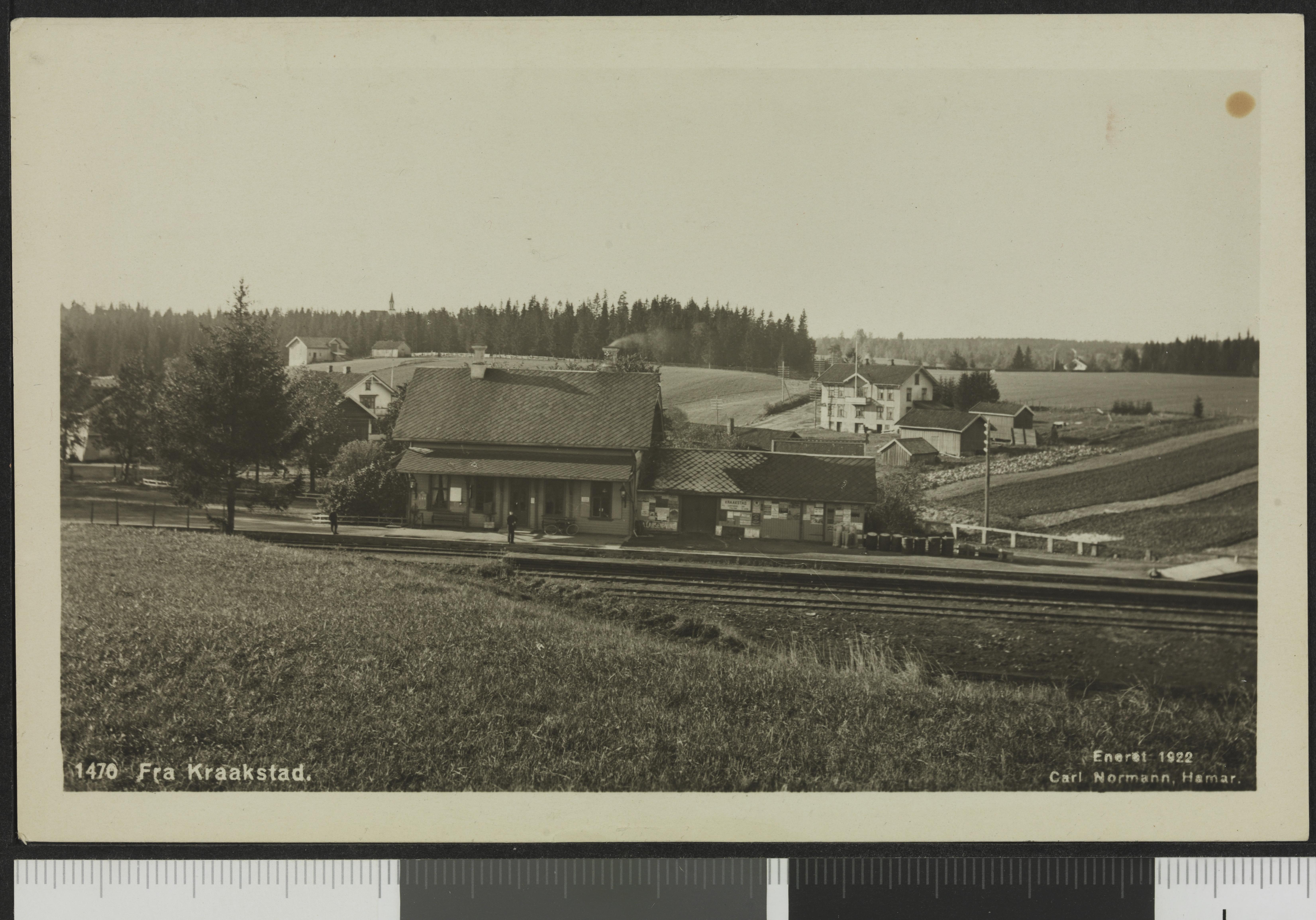
The station in 1922

The station initially became an important asset for the surrounding community, as it allowed for daily, fresh shipments of milk to the capital. However, other produce such as potatoes, vegetables, hay and firewood, were still transported by horse and carriage. This was mostly because there was a need for shipment to the door of consumers. Unlike many of station on the line, Kråkstad never developed into much of a station town, and only a few houses were built by the station. The station had 7,058 annual boarding passengers, excluding month ticket holders, in 1890. This rose to 13,564 in 1901 and then stayed more or less even for the decade. It increased throughout the 1910s, peaking at 24,032 in 1902. Numbers then fell throughout the 1920s. From 1928 a series of flag stops were built, bringing the number down to 11,893.

A dairy was built at the station in 1910. A four-story granary was built at the station in 1918. With the break-out of the First World War, the authorities were concerned for the continued grain supply. It was later taken over by Felleskjøpet and was used as a grain elevator. The station was originally named Kraakstad, but took the modern spelling in April 1921. The line was electrified on 5 December 1958. At the same time direct services to the capital were reintroduced. An interlocking system was installed on 30 May 1959.

The Norwegian National Rail Administration evaluated the future of the station in 2012, concluding that since Kråkstad lacked other good public transit, it would still receive a train service, despite having somewhat few passengers for their targets. It subsequently approved a complete renovation of the platforms and outside areas. This included new 250-meter (820 ft) platforms on both sides and a new level crossing. Unlike the larger stations, Kråkstad did not receive an overpass or underpass. This replaced a main platform which was 123 meters (404 ft) long and an island platform which was 102 meters (335 ft). These were 58 and 32 centimeters (23 and 13 in) tall, respectively. As one of the last commuter lines, the Eastern Østfold Line received centralized traffic control from 31 August 2015, no longer making it necessary to have a train dispatcher at the station for passing. It was the first Norwegian line to utilize European Rail Traffic Management System.

== Facilities ==
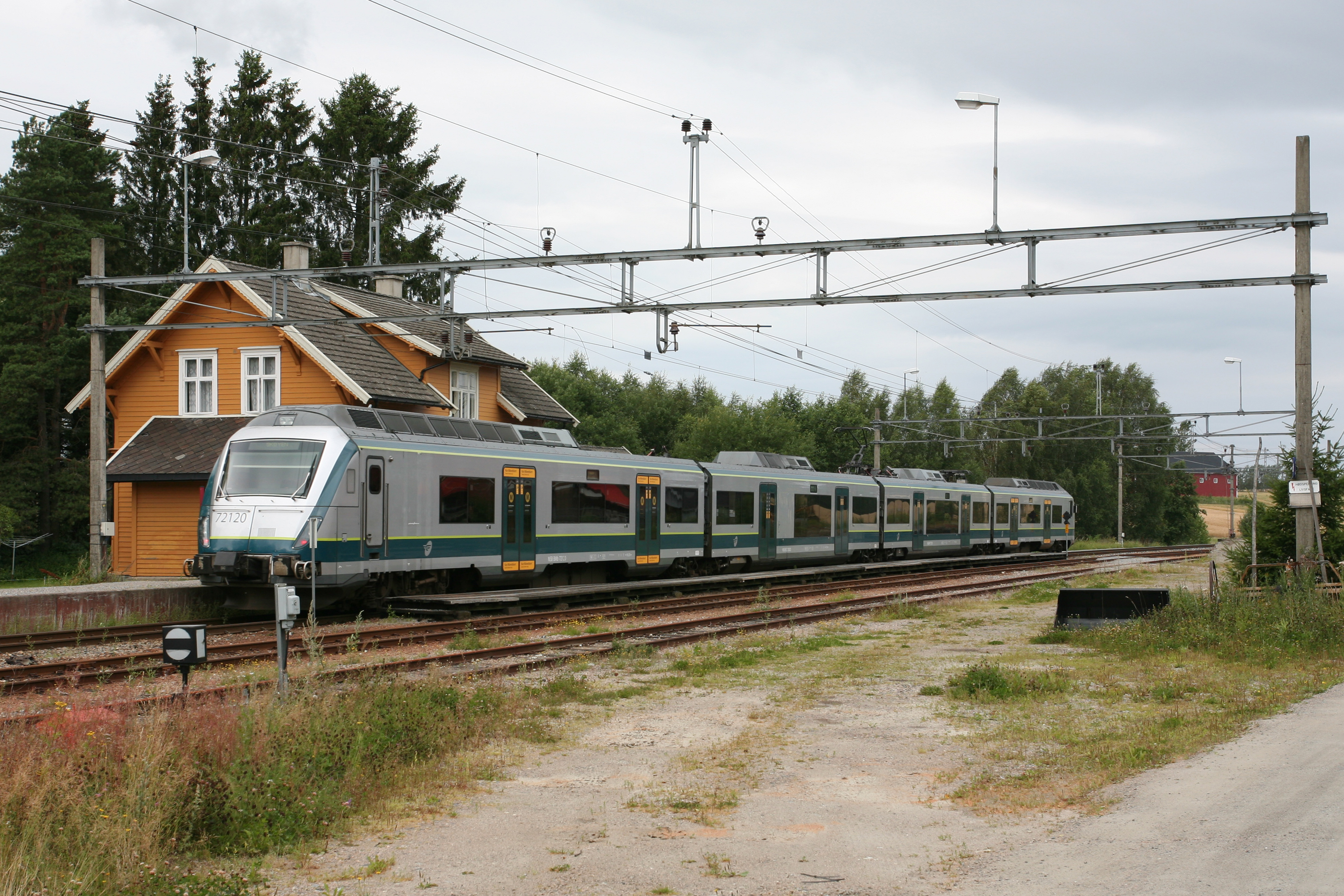
NSB Class 72 commuter train at the station, prior to the upgrades.

Kråksad Station is situated on the Eastern Østfold Line, 5.78 kilometers (3.59 mi) from Ski Station and 30.09 kilometers (18.70 mi) from Oslo S, at an elevation of 92.8 meters (304 ft) above mean sea level. The station has two side platforms which are 250 meters (820 ft) long and 76 centimeters (30 in) tall. The main passing loop at the station is 347 meters (1,138 ft) long. There is no ticket sale at the station, but a heated waiting room in the station building. There is a bicycle rack but no parking at the station. There is no transfer to bus and taxi. There is a level crossing just east of the platforms. In addition to the two through tracks, there is a spur which can be used by maintenance of way vehicles. The station mostly serves the village of Kråkstad. There are 1,208 residents within a 2-kilometer (1.2 mi) radius of the station.

The station building was designed in Swiss chalet style by Balthazar Lange, who had the responsibility for all stations along the Eastern Østfold Line. The wooden building is a third-class station and has the same design as many other stations on the line, Kråkstad Station, Tomter, Slitu, Eidsberg, Gautestad and Ise. The station building has been listed as a cultural heritage site based on it being one of the most genuine copies of the third-class Balthazar stations. It was noted for having few changes and that the original station area was largely preserved.

== Service ==
Kråkstad is served with hourly L22 trains operated by Vy's Oslo Commuter Rail. The run from Oslo via Ski and Kråkstad to Mysen or Rakkestad. Travel time is 29 minutes to Oslo S, 6 minutes to Ski and 35 minutes to Mysen. The trains continue onward from Oslo along the Drammen Line terminating at Skøyen Station. The station had 92,000 daily boarding and disembarking passengers in 2012.

== Bibliography ==
- Bjerke, Thor; Holom, Finn (2004). Banedata 2004 (in Norwegian). Hamar / Oslo: Norwegian Railway Museum / Norwegian Railway Club. ISBN 82-90286-28-7.
- Gustafson, Alfred (1992). Turbok for Ski (in Norwegian). Ski: Ski historielag.
- Hartmann, Eivind; Mangset, Øistein; Reisegg, Øyvind (1997). Neste stasjon (in Norwegian). Gyldendal. ISBN 82-05-25294-7.
- Langård, Geir-Widar; Ruud, Leif-Harald (2005). Sydbaneracer og Skandiapil – Glimt fra Østfoldbanen gjennom 125 år (in Norwegian). Oslo: Norwegian Railway Club. ISBN 978-82-90286-29-8.
- Magnus, Bi Five (1993). Kom, så skaper vi et kulturminne! (in Norwegian). Oslo: University of Oslo.
- Østlid, Martin (1929). Kråkstad – en bygdebok (in Norwegian). Vol. 1. Kråkstad: Komitéen.

Preceding station			Following station
Ski; Drømtorp	Eastern Østfold Line		Skotbu; Langli
Preceding station	Local trains		Following station
Ski	R22	Oslo S–Mysen	Skotbu
