= Solbråtan Station =

Railway station in Nordre Follo, Norway

Solbråtan
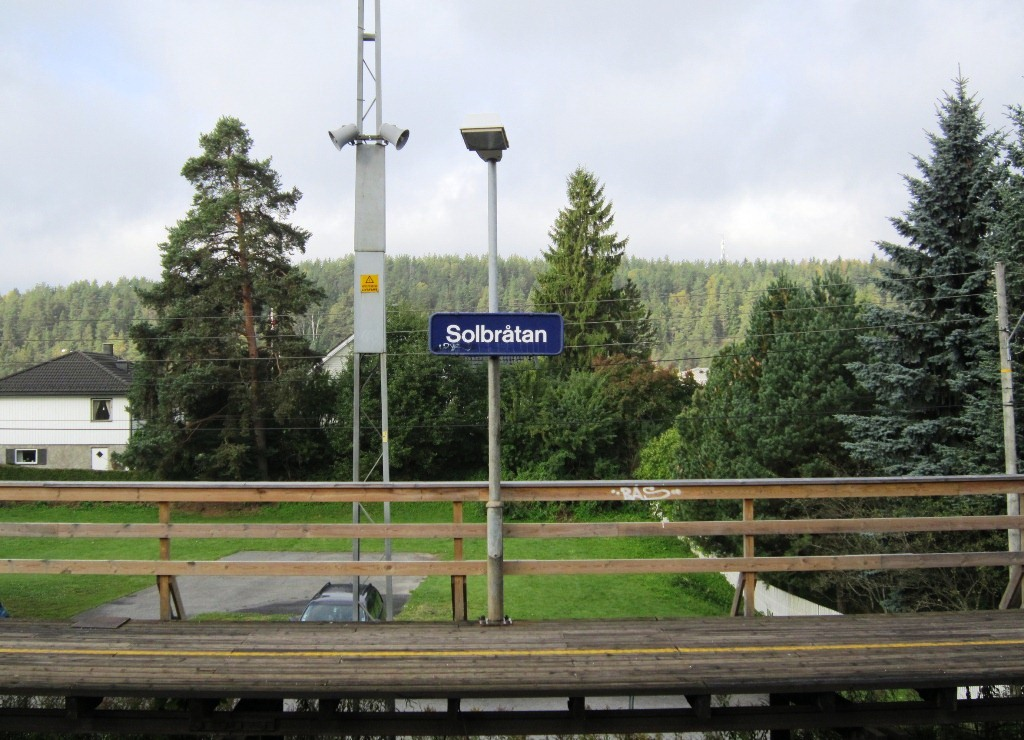

General information
- Location: Solbråtan, Oppegård; Norway
- Coordinates: 59°48′03″N 10°48′15″E
- Owner: Bane NOR
- Operator: Vy
- Line: Østfold Line
- Distance: 14.05 km
- Platforms: 2

History
- Opened: 1939
Location

Solbråtan Station (Norwegian: Solbråtan stasjon) is a railway station at Solbråtan in Oppegård, Norway. Located on the Østfold Line, it is served by the Oslo Commuter Rail line L2 operated by Vy with two hourly services. The station was opened in 1939.

Preceding station			Following station
Kolbotn	Østfold Line		Myrvoll
Preceding station	Local trains		Following station
Kolbotn	L2	Stabekk–Oslo S–Ski	Myrvoll
