= 2016 Firenasjonersturneringer =

Tournament details
- Host country: Norway
- Venue(s): 1 (in 1 host city)
- Dates: 17–20 March
- Teams: 4 (from 2 confederations)

Final positions
- Champions: Spain
- Runner-up: Norway
- Third place: Germany
- Fourth place: Brazil

Tournament statistics
- Matches played: 6
- Goals scored: 309 (51.5 per match)
- Attendance: 9,138 (1,523 per match)
- Top scorer(s): (Norway) Heidi Loke (23 goals)

The 2016 Firenasjonersturneringer (translated from the Norwegian Four Nations Tournament) was a friendly women's handball tournament organized by the Norwegian Handball Federation held at the city of Langhus as a preparation of the host nation for the Olympic Games.

== Results ==
Team	Pld	W	D	L	GF	GA	GD	Pts
Spain	3	3	0	0	75	71	+4	6
Norway	3	2	0	1	92	81	+11	4
Germany	3	1	0	2	76	78	–2	2
Brazil	3	0	0	3	66	79	–13	0

== Round robin ==
March 17; 18:30	Norway	35–28	Germany	Follo TRYKK Arena, Langhus; Attendance: 2,233
March 17; 18:30	Loke 7	(16–15)	three players 5	Follo TRYKK Arena, Langhus; Attendance: 2,233
March 17; 18:30	3× (yellow card) 2× (suspension)	Report	3× (yellow card) 2× (suspension)	Follo TRYKK Arena, Langhus; Attendance: 2,233

March 17; 20:45	Spain	23–22	Brazil	Follo TRYKK Arena, Langhus; Attendance: 297
March 17; 20:45	Alberto, Barbosa 4	(11–10)	Rodrigues 4	Follo TRYKK Arena, Langhus; Attendance: 297
March 17; 20:45	3× (yellow card) 3× (suspension)	Report	3× (yellow card) 4× (suspension)	Follo TRYKK Arena, Langhus; Attendance: 297

March 19; 15:45	Germany	24–25	Spain	Follo TRYKK Arena, Langhus; Attendance: 1,009
March 19; 15:45	Krammer, Muller 5	(14–15)	López 6	Follo TRYKK Arena, Langhus; Attendance: 1,009
March 19; 15:45	3× (yellow card) 2× (suspension)	Report	2× (yellow card) 1× (suspension)	Follo TRYKK Arena, Langhus; Attendance: 1,009

March 19; 18:00	Norway	32–26	Brazil	Follo TRYKK Arena, Langhus; Attendance: 2,072
March 19; 18:00	Loke 10	(13–10)	Rodrigues 8	Follo TRYKK Arena, Langhus; Attendance: 2,072
March 19; 18:00	3× (yellow card) 2× (suspension)	Report	2× (yellow card) 1× (suspension)	Follo TRYKK Arena, Langhus; Attendance: 2,072

March 20; 15:45	Brazil	18–24	Germany	Follo TRYKK Arena, Langhus; Attendance: 1,435
March 20; 15:45	Coppi 4	(6–13)	Muller 5	Follo TRYKK Arena, Langhus; Attendance: 1,435
March 20; 15:45	3× (yellow card) 1× (suspension)	Report	3× (yellow card) 2× (suspension)	Follo TRYKK Arena, Langhus; Attendance: 1,435

March 20; 18:00	Norway	25–27	Spain	Follo TRYKK Arena, Langhus; Attendance: 2,092
March 20; 18:00	Loke 6	(14–12)	three players 3	Follo TRYKK Arena, Langhus; Attendance: 2,092
March 20; 18:00	2× (yellow card) 1× (suspension)	Report	2× (yellow card) 2× (suspension)	Follo TRYKK Arena, Langhus; Attendance: 2,092

== Final standing ==
Rank	Team
Gold medal	Spain
2	Norway
3	Germany
4	Brazil
