= Vevelstad Station =

Railway station in Nordre Follo, Norway

Vevelstad
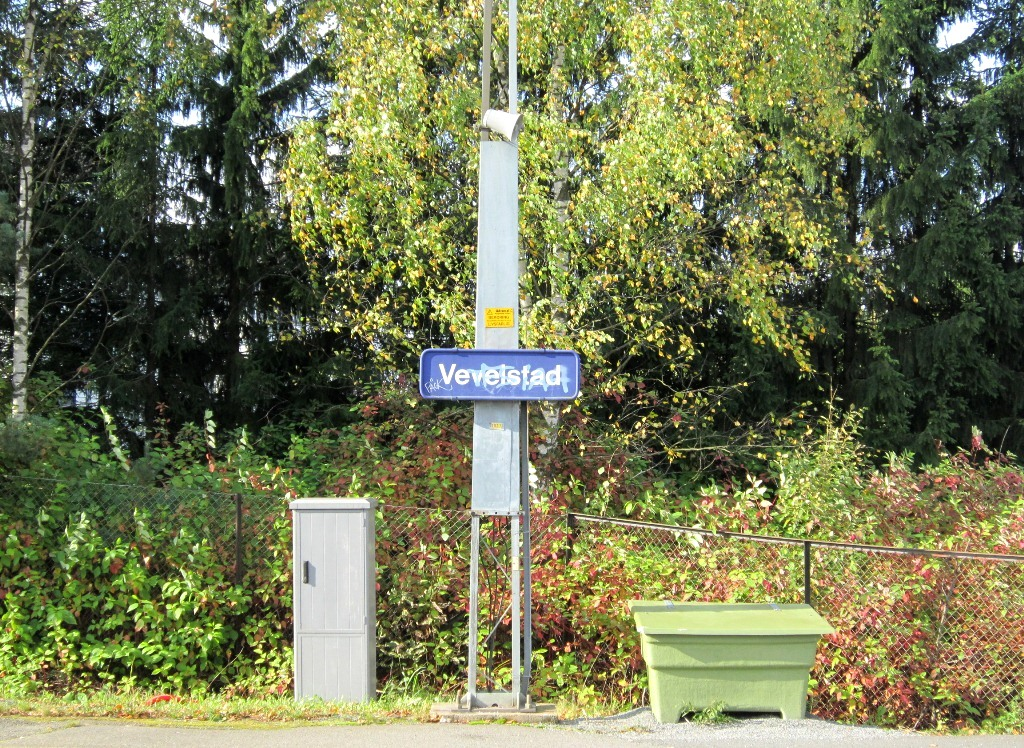

General information
- Location: Langhus, Ski; Norway
- Coordinates: 59°45′22″N 10°50′15″E
- Owner: Bane NOR
- Operator: Vy
- Line: Østfold Line
- Distance: 20.12 km
- Platforms: 2

History
- Opened: 1985
Location

Vevelstad Station (Norwegian: Vevelstad holdeplass) is located at Langhus in Ski, Norway. On the Østfold Line, the station is served by the Oslo Commuter Rail line L2 operated by Vy with two hourly services.

The station was opened in 1985. It was planned as one of two intermediate stations on the new Follo Line between Ski and Oslo, but has since been dismissed.

Preceding station			Following station
Oppegård	Østfold Line		Langhus
Preceding station	Local trains		Following station
Oppegård	L2	Stabekk–Oslo S–Ski	Langhus
