= Stun =

Stun, STUN, or stunning may refer to:

== Emotions ==
- Beauty, or something that provides pleasure
- Surprise, felt after an unexpected event

== Science and technology ==
- Unconsciousness, or not being conscious
  - Stunning, a method of rendering animals unconscious
- STUN, a computer network protocol and methods mainly used in the domain of VoIP communications
- STUN, also called Serial Tunnel, is a Cisco proprietary protocol and feature in certain releases and feature sets of Cisco IOS to emulate a direct synchronous serial connection over TCP for HDLC and SDLC based payload

== Entertainment ==
- Stunnin', a 2020 song by Curtis Waters and Harm Franklin
- The Stunning, an Irish rock band
- Stun (Bloody Roar), a character in the Bloody Roar video game series
- Stun shot, in cue sports
- S.T.U.N. (band), an American punk band

== See also ==
- Stunner (disambiguation)
