= Drømtorp Station =

Former railway station in Ski, Norway

Drømtorp

General information
- Location: Drømtorp, Ski; Norway
- Coordinates: 59°42′46″N 10°51′13″E
- Line: Eastern Østfold Line
- Distance: 25.84 km
- Platforms: 1

History
- Opened: 1932
- Closed: 2012
Location

Drømtorp Station (Norwegian: Drømtorp holdeplass) was located at Drømtorp in Ski, Norway on the Østfold Line. The railway station was served by the Oslo Commuter Rail line 560 from Oslo Central Station. The station was opened in 1932 and closed in 2012.

Preceding station		Following station
Ski	Eastern Østfold Line	Kråkstad
