= Oppegård Station =

Railway station in Nordre Follo, Norway

Oppegård
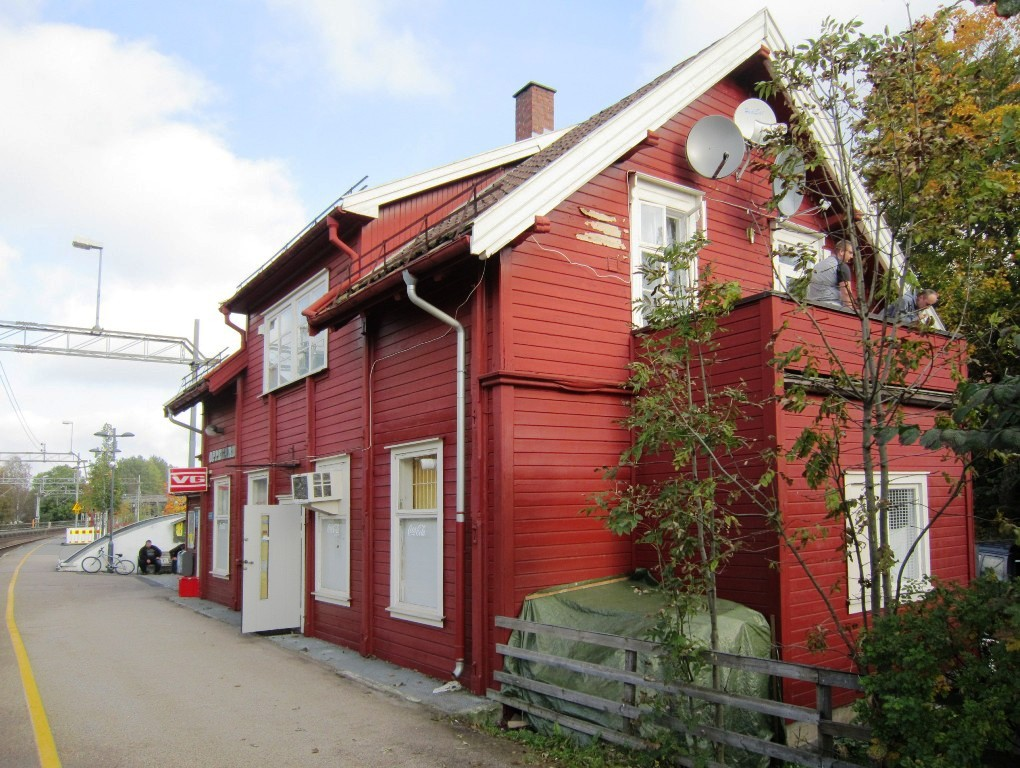
- Oppegård Station

General information
- Location: Oppegård, Norway
- Coordinates: 59°45′56″N 10°48′46″E
- Elevation: 97.9 m (321 ft)
- Owner: Bane NOR
- Operator: Vy
- Line: Østfold Line
- Distance: 18.26 km
- Platforms: 2

History
- Opened: 1879
Location

Oppegård Station (Norwegian: Oppegård stasjon) is a railway station at Oppegård in Akershus, Norway. Located on the Østfold Line, it is served by the Oslo Commuter Rail line L2 operated by Vy with two hourly services. The station was opened along with the rest of Østfold Line in 1879.

Preceding station			Following station
Greverud	Østfold Line		Vevelstad
Preceding station	Local trains		Following station
Greverud	L2	Stabekk–Oslo S–Ski	Vevelstad
