= Langhus Station =

Railway station in Nordre Follo, Norway

Langhus
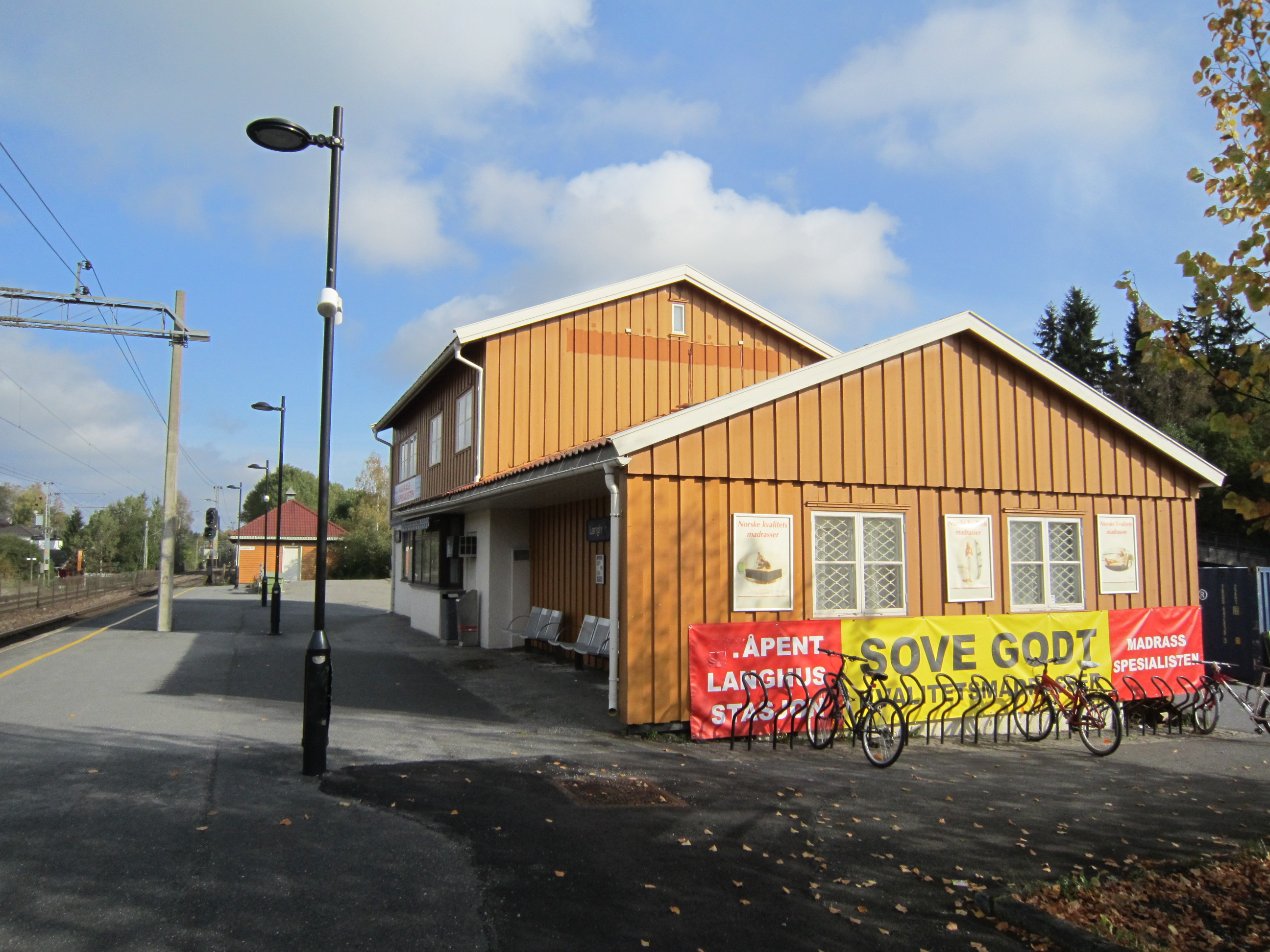

General information
- Location: Langhus, Ski; Norway
- Coordinates: 59°44′59″N 10°50′12″E
- Elevation: 111.3 m (365 ft)
- Owner: Bane NOR
- Operator: Vy
- Line: Østfold Line
- Distance: 20.77 km
- Platforms: 2

History
- Opened: 1919
Location

Langhus Station (Norwegian: Langhus stasjon) is a bi-hourly railway station at Langhus in Ski, Norway.

Located on the Østfold Line, at Langhusveien 1405, Langhus is an unsheltered and unstaffed station served by Oslo Commuter Rail, which is operated by Vy.

Langhus Station was opened in 1919.

Preceding station			Following station
Vevelstad	Østfold Line		Ski
Preceding station	Local trains		Following station
Vevelstad	L2	Stabekk–Oslo S–Ski	Ski
