= Skotbu =

- Village
- Location in Akershus
- Coordinates: 59°39′51.17″N 10°56′23.36″E
- Country: Norway
- Region: Østlandet
- County: Akershus
- Municipality: Nordre Follo
- Time zone: UTC+01:00 (CET)
  - Summer (DST): UTC+02:00 (CEST)

Skotbu is a village in Nordre Follo municipality, south of the town of Ski, in Akershus county, Norway.
