= 2005 Pan American Women's Handball Championship =

Tournament details
- Host country: Brazil
- Venue: 1 (in 1 host city)
- Dates: 25–29 May
- Teams: 6 (from 1 confederation)

Final positions
- Champions: Brazil (5th title)
- Runners-up: Argentina
- Third place: Uruguay
- Fourth place: Canada

Tournament statistics
- Matches played: 15
- Goals scored: 718 (47.87 per match)

The 2005 Pan American Women's Handball Championship was the eighth edition of the Pan American Women's Handball Championship, held in Brazil. It acted as the American qualifying tournament for the 2005 World Women's Handball Championship.

== Standings ==
Team	Pld	W	D	L	GF	GA	GD	Pts
Brazil (H)	5	5	0	0	166	56	+110	10
Argentina	5	4	0	1	122	103	+19	8
Uruguay	5	3	0	2	118	139	−21	6
Canada	5	2	0	3	106	139	−33	4
Dominican Republic	5	1	0	4	115	143	−28	2
United States	5	0	0	5	91	138	−47	0

(H) Hosts

== Results ==
All times are local (UTC−3).

25 May 2005; 15:00	Argentina	22–18	Dominican Republic
25 May 2005; 15:00		(11–8)

25 May 2005; 17:00	Uruguay	28–24	United States
25 May 2005; 17:00		(12–9)

25 May 2005; 20:00	Brazil	41–10	Canada
25 May 2005; 20:00		(17–3)

26 May 2005; 16:00	Canada	24–15	United States
26 May 2005; 16:00		(7–9)

26 May 2005; 18:00	Argentina	32–18	Uruguay
26 May 2005; 18:00		(17–9)

26 May 2005; 20:00	Brazil	39–14	Dominican Republic
26 May 2005; 20:00		(15–11)

27 May 2005; 16:00	Uruguay	31–26	Dominican Republic
27 May 2005; 16:00		(17–11)

27 May 2005; 18:00	Argentina	29–22	Canada
27 May 2005; 18:00		(15–11)

27 May 2005; 20:00	Brazil	27–8	United States
27 May 2005; 20:00		(13–4)

28 May 2005; 13:00	Argentina	29–21	United States
28 May 2005; 13:00		(14–7)

28 May 2005; 15:00	Brazil	35–14	Uruguay
28 May 2005; 15:00		(18–4)

28 May 2005; 17:00	Canada	28–27	Dominican Republic
28 May 2005; 17:00		(15–13)

29 May 2005; 08:00	Dominican Republic	30–23	United States
29 May 2005; 08:00		(13–14)

29 May 2005; 09:30	Uruguay	27–22	Canada
29 May 2005; 09:30		(10–14)

29 May 2005; 11:30	Brazil	24–10	Argentina
29 May 2005; 11:30		(12–6)

== Final ranking ==
Qualified for the 2005 World Championship

Rank	Team
Gold medal	Brazil
Silver medal	Argentina
Bronze medal	Uruguay
4	Canada
5	Dominican Republic
6	United States
