= Tomter =

Village in Norway

Coordinates: 59°39′N 11°00′E

- Village
- Location within Østfold Location within Norway

Area
  - Total: 108 km^{2} (42 sq mi)

Population (2023)
  - Total: 2,209
  - Density: 20.5/km^{2} (53.0/sq mi)
- Time zone: UTC+1 (CET)
  - Summer (DST): UTC+2 (CEST)
- Postal code: 1825
- Climate: Dfb

Tomter is a village in Indre Østfold municipality in the county of Østfold, Norway. As of 2022, Tomter has 2108 inhabitants. It is the largest village in the former Hobøl municipality, now part of Indre Østfold. Tomter is situated approximately 40 kilometres south of Norway's capital, Oslo, and approximately 15 kilometres northwest of the biggest city in Indre Østfold, Askim. Oslo is easily reached with a 27 minute train ride from Tomter Station. Tomter is one of five villages and cities in Indre Østfold municipality. The others being: Spydeberg, Skjønhaug, Mysen and Askim. Tomter's population has been increasing heavily the last few years, because of its close proximity to the capital, and train station. Because of this, there is always a lot of construction and development all over the town. Since 2012, Tomter's population has increased with almost 500.

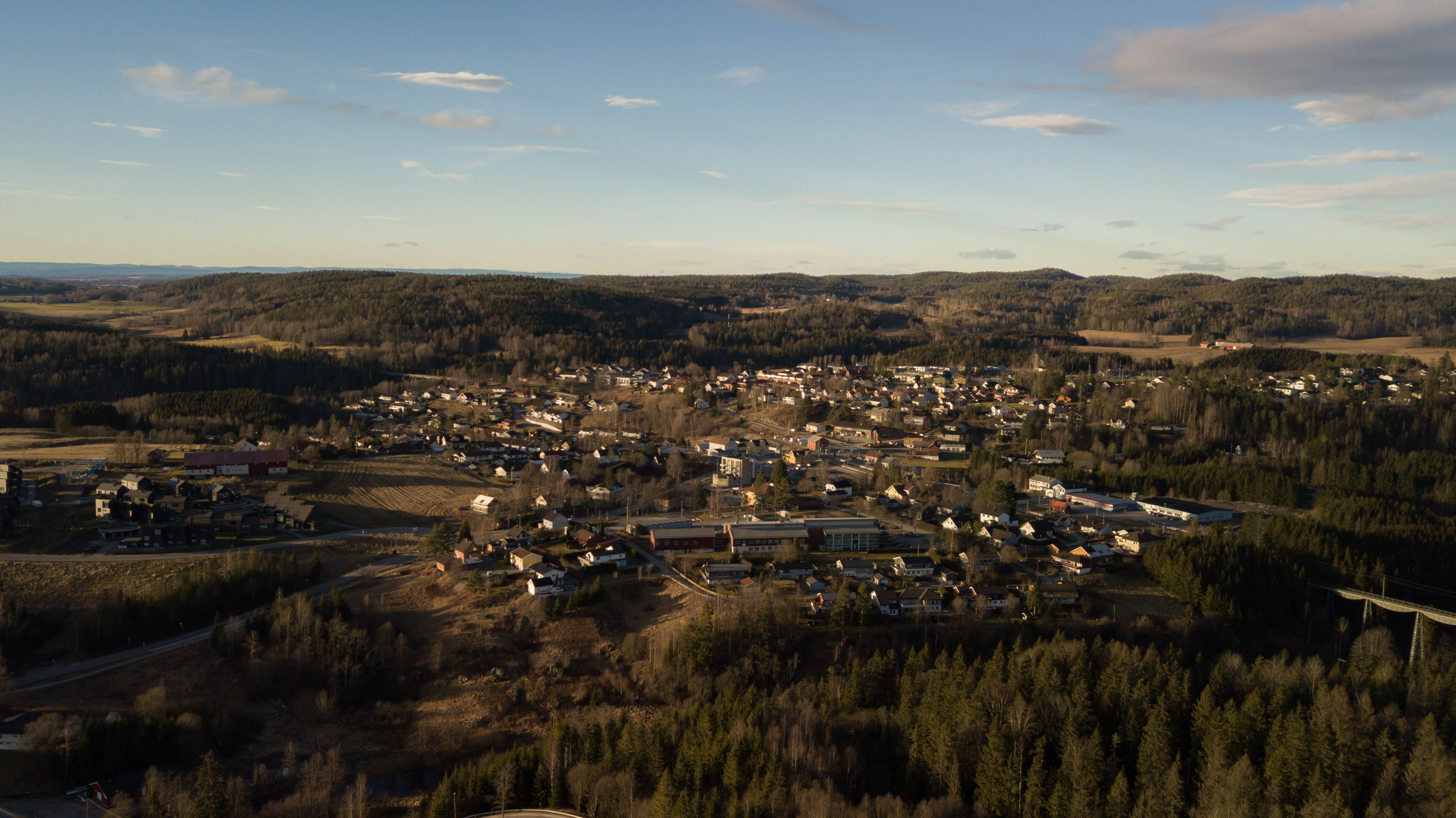
Tomter from the air. Foto: Audun Leganger

== Availability ==
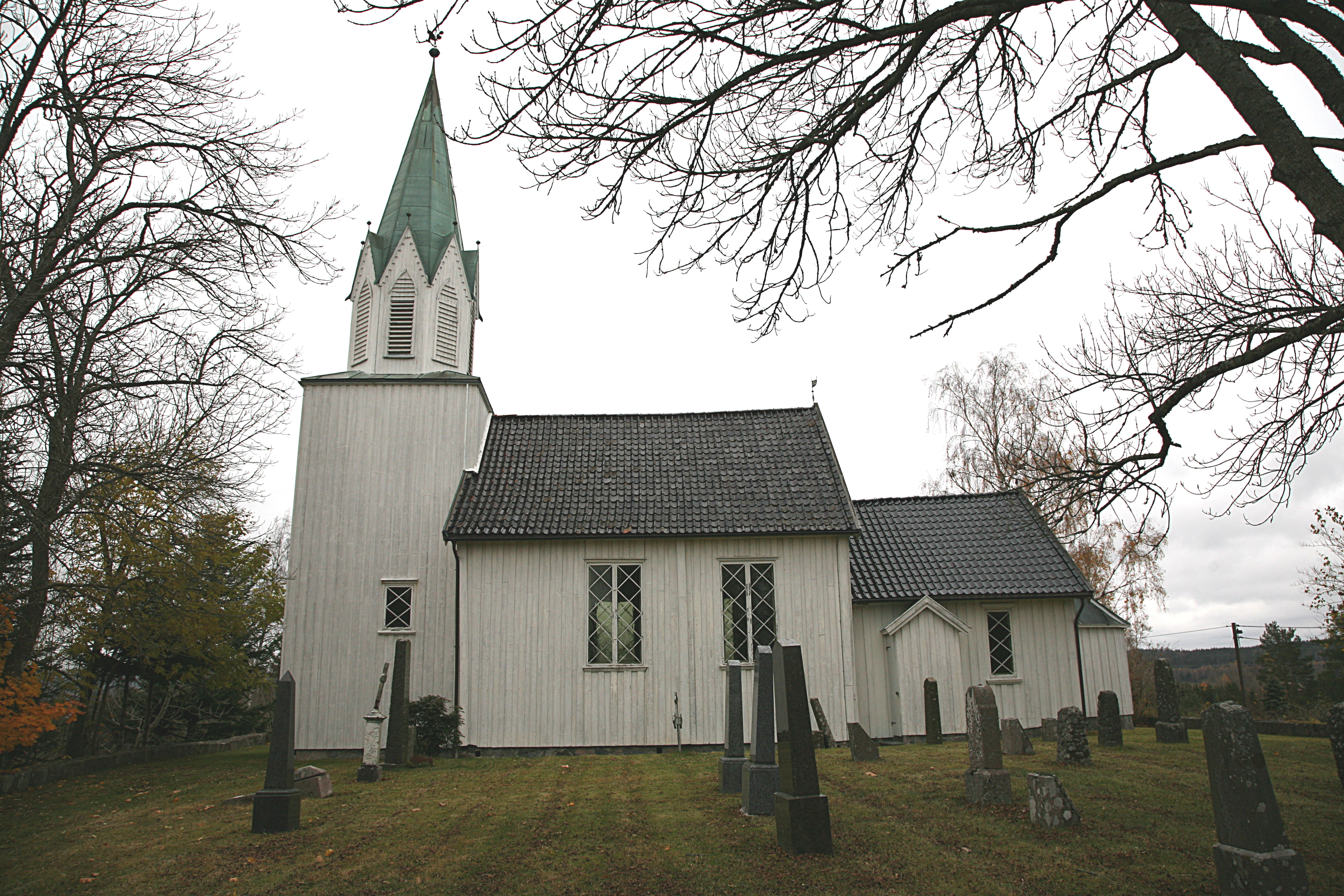
Tomter Church

Tomter Station has connections to the cities of Oslo, Ski, Askim, and Mysen, all part of The Østfold Line's eastern line. On the weekdays, trains arrive at the station every 30 minutes, with every other train going the other way. On the weekends, it's once an hour. In the rushhours, theres two trains every 30 minutes going each way. Not many buses pass through Tomter, except for the school buses going to Knapstad Middle School and Askim Upper Secondary School and Mysen Upper Secondary School. Most teenagers from Tomter attend Askim Upper Secondary School, and a few attend Mysen Upper Secondary School or something else.

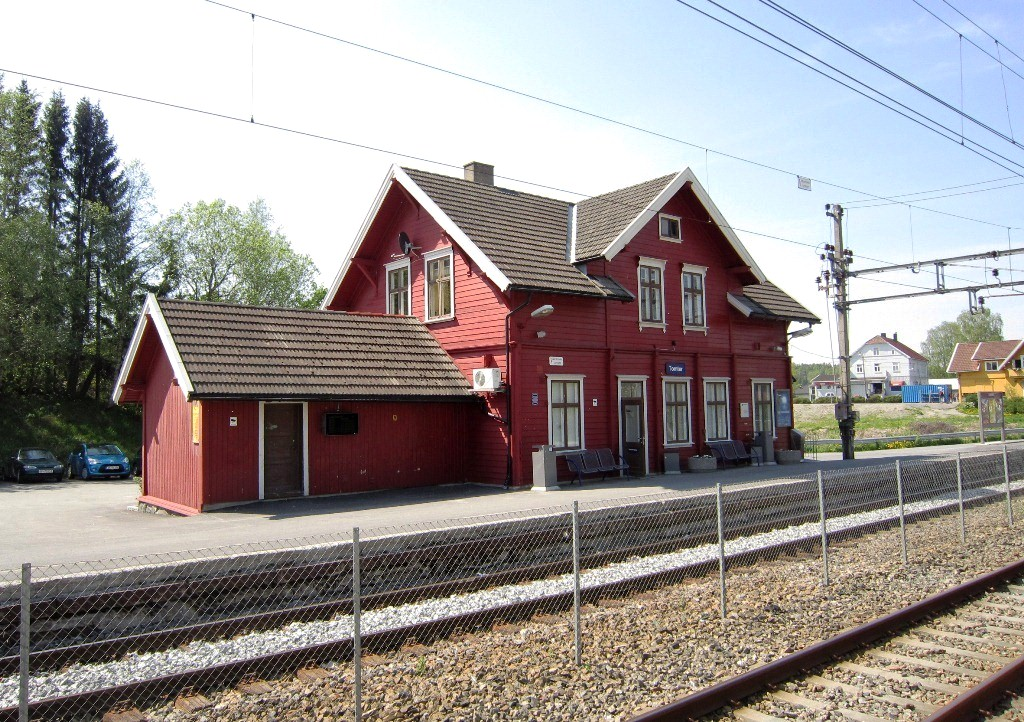
Tomter Station on The Østfold Line

== Facilities and activities ==
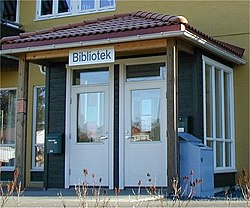
Picture of the library in Tomter

The village is the site of Tomter Church (Tomter kirke). The village has an elementary school, grocery store, pub, kiosk, museum, library, post office, pizza bakery and hairdresser. It also has a sports field with two football pitches, sports house and eight ski jumps. Tomter has a railway station on Østre Linje, a part of the Østfold Line. The village had a gas station and a fire department earlier.

== Notable people ==
Magnus Jøndal, professional handball player.
