= Norwegian Labour Party's Women's Federation =

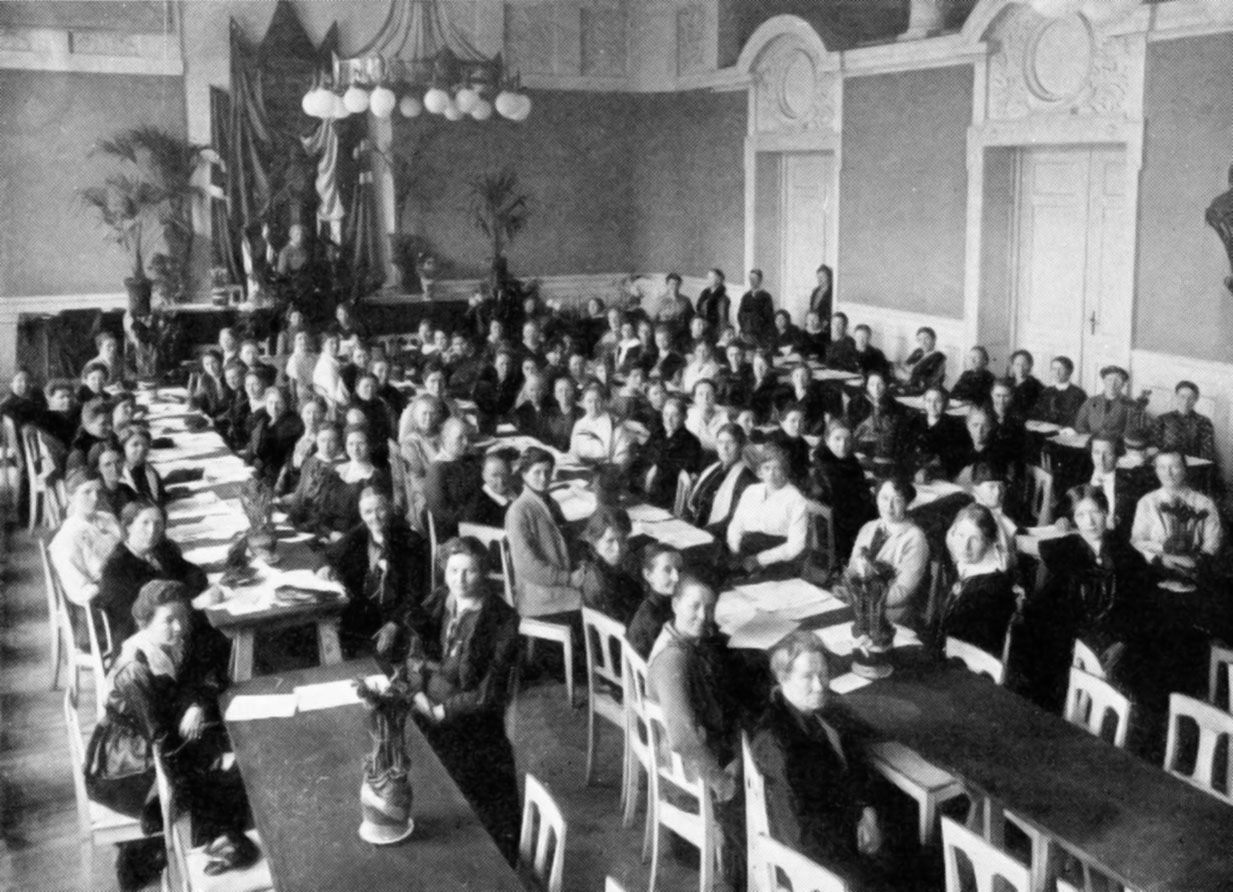
Meeting of the Labour Party's Women's Federation in 1918

The Norwegian Labour Party's Women's Federation (Norwegian: Arbeiderpartiets kvindeforbund) was the women's wing of the Norwegian Labour Party. It was established in Christiania in 1901 and extended to cover the whole of Norway in 1909.

Initially concerned with working conditions and voting rights, its interests were extended over the years. The movement was dissolved in 2005 when the Labour Party adopted equal gender distribution in all its bodies, both national and local. In its place, a looser "women's network" was set up within the party in order to bring women into leadership roles at all levels.

== History ==
The Women's Federation has been the most important organization in Norway's labour women's movement despite challenges in 1937 from the Labour Housewives Group (Norges Husmorlagsforbund) affiliated with the Communist Party and in 1954 from the Norwegian Women's Federation (Norsk Kvinneforbund) which was active until 1999. Both these organizations represented a minority of political workers.

For many years the organization was concerned mainly with better living conditions for working-class families and increasing the acceptance of housewives in society at large. From the late 1960s, the focus turned to gender equality at work and in politics. As international discussion developed on whether women's organizations should continue in their own right or as part of an integrated party approach, in Norway it was decided to bring the movement closer to party priorities. In 2005, the organization was dissolved and replaced with a women's network with the Labour Party.

== Key figures ==
Important figures in the organization over the years include Gunhild Ziener (1868–1937), Martha Tynæs (1870–1930), Hanna Adolfsen (1872–1926), Thina Thorleifsen (1885–1959), Johanne Reutz Gjermoe (1896–1989), Aase Lionæs (1907–1999), Rakel Seweriin (1906–1995), Aase Bjerkholt (1915–2012) and Sylvia Brustad (born 1966). Karita Bekkemellem (born 1965) became the organization's leader in 1998 and headed the newly formed women's network until 2009.
