= Stunner =

Stunner or Stunners may refer to:

- Stunner (cattle), a mechanical device used in modern cattle slaughter processes
- Stunner (missile), an Israeli anti-missile
- Stunner (professional wrestling), a professional wrestling attack
- Stunner (weapon), a type of fictional weapon that disables an opponent temporarily by knocking them out
- Stunner (Stone Age site), a prehistoric settlement
- Honda CBF125, a motorcycle called the Stunner in the Indian market
- The Stunners (group), a pop music girl group from Los Angeles
- St. Louis Stunners, an American Basketball Association team
