= 2019 Japan Cup (handball) =

Tournament details
- Host country: Japan
- Venue: 1 (in 1 host city)
- Dates: 21–24 November
- Teams: 4 (from 3 confederations)

Final positions
- Champions: France
- Runners-up: Slovenia
- Third place: Brazil
- Fourth place: Japan

Tournament statistics
- Matches played: 6
- Goals scored: 328 (54.67 per match)

The 2019 Japan Cup was a women's handball tournament held in Shibuya Tokyo, Japan at the Yoyogi National Gymnasium between 21–24 November, organised by the Japan Handball Association as preparation for the home team for the 2019 World Women's Handball Championship and as a test event for the 2020 Summer Olympics.

== Results ==
Team	Pld	W	D	L	GF	GA	GD	Pts
France	3	3	0	0	94	66	28	6
Slovenia	3	1	1	1	82	90	–8	3
Brazil	3	1	0	2	79	88	–9	2
Japan	3	0	1	2	73	84	–11	1

== Round robin ==
All times are local (UTC+09:00).

November 21; 17:30	France	33–22	Brazil	Yoyogi National Gymnasium, Tokyo
November 21; 17:30	Four players 4	(16–7)	Vieira 5	Yoyogi National Gymnasium, Tokyo
November 21; 17:30	2× (yellow card) 5× (suspension)	Report	1× (suspension)	Yoyogi National Gymnasium, Tokyo

November 21; 20:00	Japan	28–28	Slovenia	Yoyogi National Gymnasium, Tokyo
November 21; 20:00	Fujita, Ohyama 5	(14–13)	Gros 10	Yoyogi National Gymnasium, Tokyo
November 21; 20:00	3× (yellow card) 2× (suspension)	Report	2× (yellow card) 3× (suspension)	Yoyogi National Gymnasium, Tokyo

November 23; 17:30	Brazil	29–33	Slovenia	Yoyogi National Gymnasium, Tokyo
November 23; 17:30	de Paula 6	(16–15)	Gros, Stanko 8	Yoyogi National Gymnasium, Tokyo
November 23; 17:30	2× (suspension)	Report	2× (yellow card) 4× (suspension)	Yoyogi National Gymnasium, Tokyo

November 23; 20:00	Japan	23–28	France	Yoyogi National Gymnasium, Tokyo
November 23; 20:00	Ohyama 4	(11–15)	N'Gouan 7	Yoyogi National Gymnasium, Tokyo
November 23; 20:00	1× (yellow card) 3× (suspension)	Report	2× (yellow card) 4× (suspension)	Yoyogi National Gymnasium, Tokyo

November 24; 17:30	Japan	22–28	Brazil	Yoyogi National Gymnasium, Tokyo
November 24; 17:30	Kawata 5	(14–18)	Cardoso 5	Yoyogi National Gymnasium, Tokyo
November 24; 17:30	3× (suspension)	Report	5× (suspension)	Yoyogi National Gymnasium, Tokyo

November 24; 20:00	Slovenia	21–33	France	Yoyogi National Gymnasium, Tokyo
November 24; 20:00	Vucko 6	(9–15)	Lacrabere 6	Yoyogi National Gymnasium, Tokyo
November 24; 20:00	6× (suspension)	Report	1× (yellow card) 5× (suspension) 1× (red card)	Yoyogi National Gymnasium, Tokyo

== Final standing ==
Rank	Team
Gold medal	France
2	Slovenia
3	Brazil
4	Japan
