= Alf Magne Austad =

Norwegian painter (1946–2013)

Alf Magne Austad (28 March 1946 – 17 August 2013) was a Norwegian painter.

Born in Haugesund, he studied at the Norwegian National Academy of Craft and Art Industry, the Norwegian National Academy of Fine Arts, the Royal Institute of Art and the Académie de la Grande Chaumière. He taught at the Western Norway Academty of Arts from 1980, and was its rector from 1982. As a painter, he subscribed to realist painting from the 1970s, inspired by pop art, photographic realism and surrealism. He participated four times at the Autumn Exhibition and his works have been bought, among others, by the National Gallery of Norway, Riksgalleriet and the Arts Council Norway. He resided in Ski, Norway, and died in August 2013 in Oslo.
