= Thina Thorleifsen =

Norwegian politician and women's rights activist

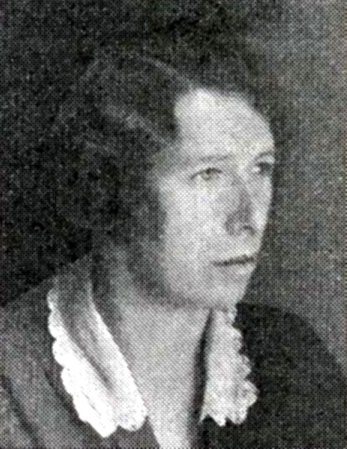
Thina Thorleifsen

Thina Nilsine Thorleifsen (1885–1959) was a Norwegian politician who was active in the women's movement. She was a prominent member of Den Kvinnelige Tjenerstands Forening (The Women's Servant Class Association) from 1910 and its chair from 1915. After the association joined the Labour Party, she became a leading member of the Norwegian Labour Party's Women's Federation from 1918, remaining in key positions until 1953.

== Biography ==
Born on 17 January 1885 in Hokksund, Øvre Eiker, she was the daughter of Thorleif Olsen (born 1846) and his partner Ingeborg (born 1851). When she was 17, she became a maid in the home of the poet Per Sivle who awakened her interest in politics. She later moved to Christiania where she was a housemaid for the politician Kyrre Grepp. In 1907, in connection with a dispute in the paper industry, she took part in a demonstration in St. Hanshaugen where she experienced the workers strong spirit of cohesion. "From that day on, I was ready to join the labour movement," she later explained.

She became a member of the Women's Servant Class Association in 1910, serving as its chairman in 1915. When the organization joined the Labour Party, she joined the executive committee of the party's Women's Federation. In 1918, when Hanna Adolfsen retired as a result of failing health, Thorleifsen became the federation's leader. The same year, she was elected as a deputy member of the Labour Party's central committee, serving as a full member from 1919 to 1923. In 1923, Thorleifer, together with Sigrid Syvertsen, established the Labour Party's Women's Secretariat (Arbeiderpartiets Kvinnesekretariat) directly answerable to the party's leadership. Under the chairmanship of Syvertsen, she filled the post of permanent secretary until 1953, always serving the interests of the party. Her success in politics was mainly a result of her organizational abilities and her public speaking. While others used the Women's Federation as a springboard, she continued to support the movement loyally until she was forced into retirement for health reasons. Thorleifsen also served as a member of Oslo's city council from 1932 to 1934.

Together with Sigrid Syvertsen, Thorleifer wrote Kvinner i strid: historien om Arbeiderpartiets kvinnebevegelse (1960), the only comprehensive historical account of the Labour Party's Women's Federation.
