= Langhus =

- Village
- Location within Norway Langhus (Norway)
- Coordinates: 59°45′0″N 10°50′0″E
- Country: Norway
- County: Akershus
- District: Follo
- Municipality: Nordre Follo

Population
  - Total: 13,000
- Time zone: UTC+1 (CET)
  - Summer (DST): UTC+2 (CEST)
- Postal code: 1405

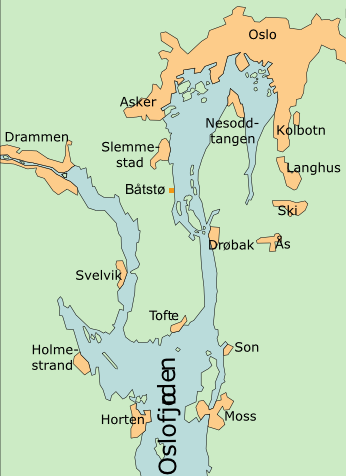
Langhus is located south of Oslo

Langhus is a suburban area in the municipality of Nordre Follo in Akershus, Norway. With a population of about 13,000, Langhus includes the local areas of Bøleråsen, Vevelstad and Langhus.

== Transport ==
Langhus (Bøleråsen) streetscape.

The village is stretched along the Østfold railway line, which runs between Oslo S and Ski and includes Langhus and Vevelstad railway stations. The distance between Langhus and Vevelstad stations is 650 metres.

== Education ==
There are three primary schools in Langhus (Bøleråsen Skole, Vevelstadåsen Skole and Langhus Skole) and one Secondary School (Haugjordet Ungdomsskole). Another secondary school, Vevelstad Ungdomskole, was located near the church but is now no longer in use.

== Other facilities ==
The commercial centre of Langhus is known as Langhussenteret and includes Langhus Post Office, a supermarket, cafes and other stores. A gas station is located north of Langhussenteret. Following release of new residential land, Langhus has grown significantly since 1980. The local church built on the higher ground above Langhussenteret was opened in 1990. A retirement home was built in Langhus in 2009, near the lake Fosstjern. PostNord has its hub for package deliveries in Langhus.

== Notable Langhus locals ==
Several well-known musicians began their careers in the Langhus area during the mid to late 1980s, playing at the local practice room, including the black metal band Mayhem and black metal artist Simen Hestnæs. The opera singer and conductor Rolf Nykmark began his career in the Langhus area.

The Norwegian football player Antonio Nusa is from Langhus. He is known for playing very well for the Norwegian national team.
