= 2019 Women's International Tournament of Spain =

Tournament details
- Host country: Spain
- Venue: 1 (in 1 host city)
- Dates: 21–23 March
- Teams: 4 (from 2 confederations)

Final positions
- Champions: Spain
- Runners-up: Serbia
- Third place: Brazil
- Fourth place: Switzerland

Tournament statistics
- Matches played: 6
- Goals scored: 317 (52.83 per match)
- Top scorer(s): (Serbia) Katarina Krpež Šlezak (21 goals)

The 2019 Women's International Tournament of Spain was the 23nd edition of the Women's International Tournament Of Spain, held in Palencia, Spain between 21 and 23 March as a friendly handball tournament organised by the Royal Spanish Handball Federation.

== Results ==
Team	Pld	W	D	L	GF	GA	GD	Pts
Spain	3	3	0	0	94	71	23	6
Serbia	3	2	0	1	88	79	9	4
Brazil	3	1	0	2	80	73	7	2
Switzerland	3	0	0	3	55	94	–39	0

== Round robin ==
All times are local (UTC+1).

March 21; 18:00	Brazil	27–29	Serbia	Pabellón Municipal de Deportes, Palencia
March 21; 18:00	Araújo, Vieira 4	(16–16)	Slezak 7	Pabellón Municipal de Deportes, Palencia
March 21; 18:00		Report		Pabellón Municipal de Deportes, Palencia

March 21; 20:00	Spain	35–18	Switzerland	Pabellón Municipal de Deportes, Palencia
March 21; 20:00	Martínez 5	(17–9)	Hodel 7	Pabellón Municipal de Deportes, Palencia
March 21; 20:00		Report		Pabellón Municipal de Deportes, Palencia

March 22; 18:30	Switzerland	16–28	Brazil	Pabellón Municipal de Deportes, Palencia
March 22; 18:30	Gautschi 6	(8–18)	Costa 8	Pabellón Municipal de Deportes, Palencia
March 22; 18:30		Report		Pabellón Municipal de Deportes, Palencia

March 22; 20:30	Spain	31–28	Serbia	Pabellón Municipal de Deportes, Palencia
March 22; 20:30	Pena 7	(14–15)	Slezak 8	Pabellón Municipal de Deportes, Palencia
March 22; 20:30		Report		Pabellón Municipal de Deportes, Palencia

March 23; 14:30	Serbia	31–21	Switzerland	Pabellón Municipal de Deportes, Palencia
March 23; 14:30	Slezak 6	(10–12)	Kähr 5	Pabellón Municipal de Deportes, Palencia
March 23; 14:30		Report		Pabellón Municipal de Deportes, Palencia

March 23; 17:00	Spain	28–25	Brazil	Pabellón Municipal de Deportes, Palencia
March 23; 17:00	González 5	(13–15)	de Paula 6	Pabellón Municipal de Deportes, Palencia
March 23; 17:00		Report		Pabellón Municipal de Deportes, Palencia

== Final standing ==
Rank	Team
Gold medal	Spain
2	Brazil
3	Germany
4	Poland
