= Martha Tynæs =

Norwegian social worker, politician and women's rights activist

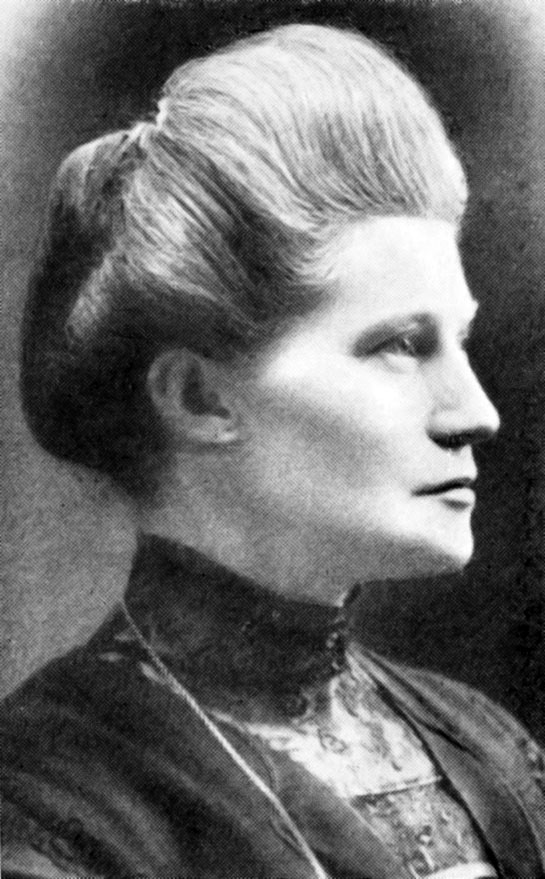
Martha Tynæs

Martha Ottomine Steen Tynæs (5 November 1870 – 8 January 1930) was a Norwegian feminist, social worker and politician. She was one of the pioneering members of the Norwegian Labour Party's Women's Federation which she chaired almost without interruption from 1904 to 1920. From 1901 to 1918 she served as the only woman on the Labour Party's central committee and chaired Christiania's city council from 1908 to 1919. In 1909, she became the first Norwegian women to become a parliamentary candidate when she stood in the constituency of Hammersborg, although she was not elected.

== Biography ==
Martha Ottomine Steen was born on 5 November 1870 in Florø on the west coast, the daughter of Ole Olsen Steen, a merchant, and Karen Martine Hauge. In 1894, she married Lars Larsen Tynæs, a house painter, who died while she was still young in 1910. She became one of the most influential women in the Norwegian women's movement, clearly stating her case at the Labour Party's congress in 1899 when she asked: "Why are women so lethargic and indifferent about the workers' movement and their social conditions?" Her talents as a public speaker and activist served her both in the party and in the Women's Federation.

She was able to impact municipal policy-making in a variety of areas, including schools, living conditions, and facilities for children and the elderly. She contributed in particular to developing legislation for children born outside of wedlock. Widowed while still young, she was left with the responsibility of raising three children. In the Women's Federation, she helped to build up membership by establishing six new affiliates in the various districts of Christiania, leading to hundreds of new supporters. The organization's annual meeting in 1909 extended the organization's mandate to cover the whole of Norway. One of her most important political successes was in achieving full voting rights for women in 1913.

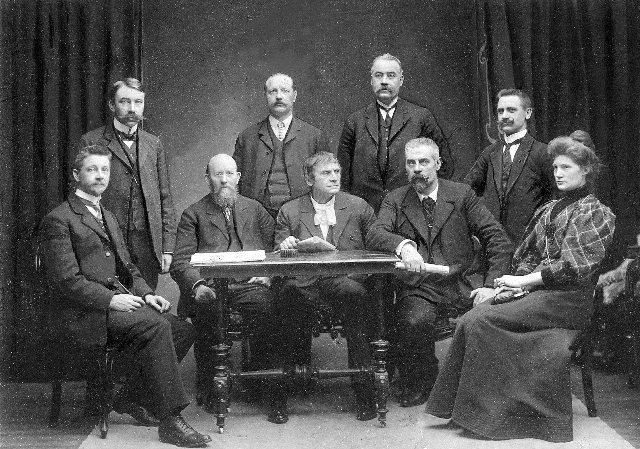
Martha Tynæs (right) with the Labour Party's central committee

Tynæs was above all concerned with issues related to the working classes rather than those differentiating women from men, inspired by the writings of Ferdinand Lassalle, August Bebel, Karl Marx and Peter Kropotkin. Her goal was always to involve women in the fight for political socialism. In 1921, she left the Labour Party to join the newly established Social Democratic Labour Party of Norway (which in fact merged with the Labour Party in 1927).

Tynæs began to cut back on her responsibilities from 1918 owing to failing health, resigning from her chairmanship of the Women's Federation in 1920. Together with Gunhild Ziener and a number of the other early members, she founded Norway's Social Democratic Women's Federation (Norges Sosialdemokratiske Kvinneforbund) in 1922.

After a long illness, Martha Tynæs died on 8 January 1930 in Oslo. She was widely recognized for her intelligence, kindness and collaborative skills.
