= Gunhild Ziener =

Norwegian politician and women's rights activist

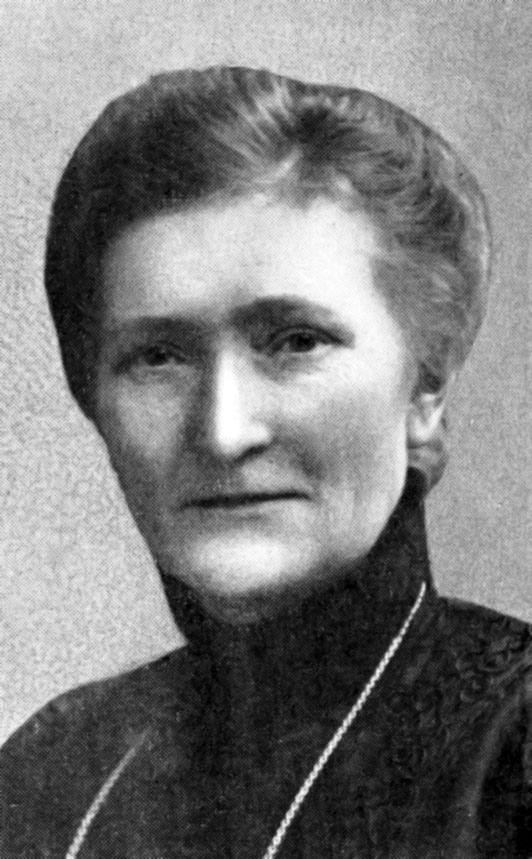
- Born: 1868; Ski, Norway
- Died: 1937 (aged 68–69)
- Known for: Norway's women's movement
- Political party: Norwegian Labour Party

Gunhild Ziener (née Krakelsrud, 1868–1937) was a Norwegian socialist and politician. A pioneer in Norway's women's movement, she was the first president of the Norwegian Labour Party's Women's Federation when it was established in Christiania in 1901. Thereafter she fostered its extension throughout the country. She was also involved in launching the organization's magazine, Arbejder-Kvinnen (lit. 'The Working-class Woman') in 1908.

== Life ==
Krakelsrud was born on 19 August 1868 in Ski, the south of Norway.

=== Labour Party's Women's Federation ===
In 1895, she joined a number of women in the Labour Party who formed the Norwegian Labour Party's Women's Federation, which set out to improve the party's press. Initially she served as a cashier but soon made her mark as an activist, pressing for collaboration between the trades unions and the political associations. In 1901, she became the first leader of the Labour Party's Women's Federation. An organizer, she lectured around the country, and who calling for organizational change. In 1909, she launched the association's women's magazine, serving on the editorial committee until 1918.

Ziener left the leadership of the Women's Federation in 1904, but who served on the executive board until 1918. She was supported the women who worked from the trades unions. In 1904, she was appointed of the organization by Martha Tynæs.

== See also ==
- Norwegian women's rights activists
