= Tomter Station =

Railway station in Hobøl, Norway

Tomter
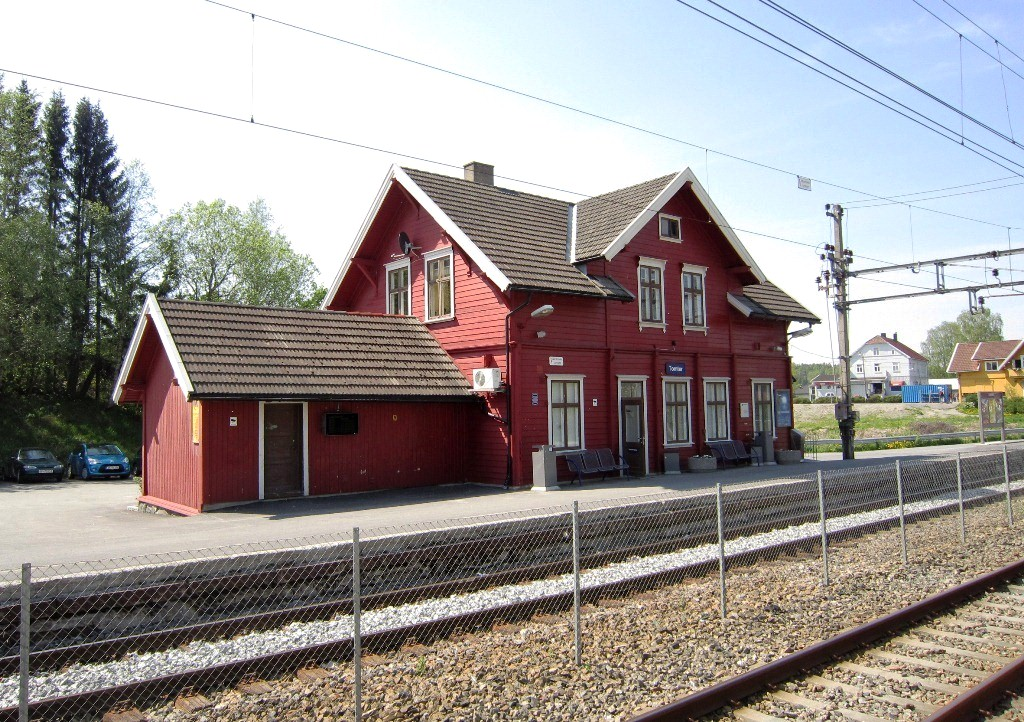

General information
- Location: Tomter, Hobøl; Norway
- Coordinates: 59°39′36″N 11°00′09″E
- Owner: Bane NOR
- Operator: Vy
- Line: Eastern Østfold Line
- Distance: 37.20 km
- Platforms: 1

Other information
- Station code: TOM

History
- Opened: 1882
Location

Tomter Station (Norwegian: Tomter stasjon) is located at Tomter in Hobøl, Norway on the Østfold Line. The railway station is served by the Oslo Commuter Rail line R22 from Oslo Central Station. The station was opened in 1882.

Preceding station			Following station
Skotbu	Eastern Østfold Line		Knapstad
Preceding station	Local trains		Following station
Skotbu	R22	Oslo S–Mysen	Knapstad
