= Knapstad Station =

Railway station in Hobøl, Norway

Knapstad
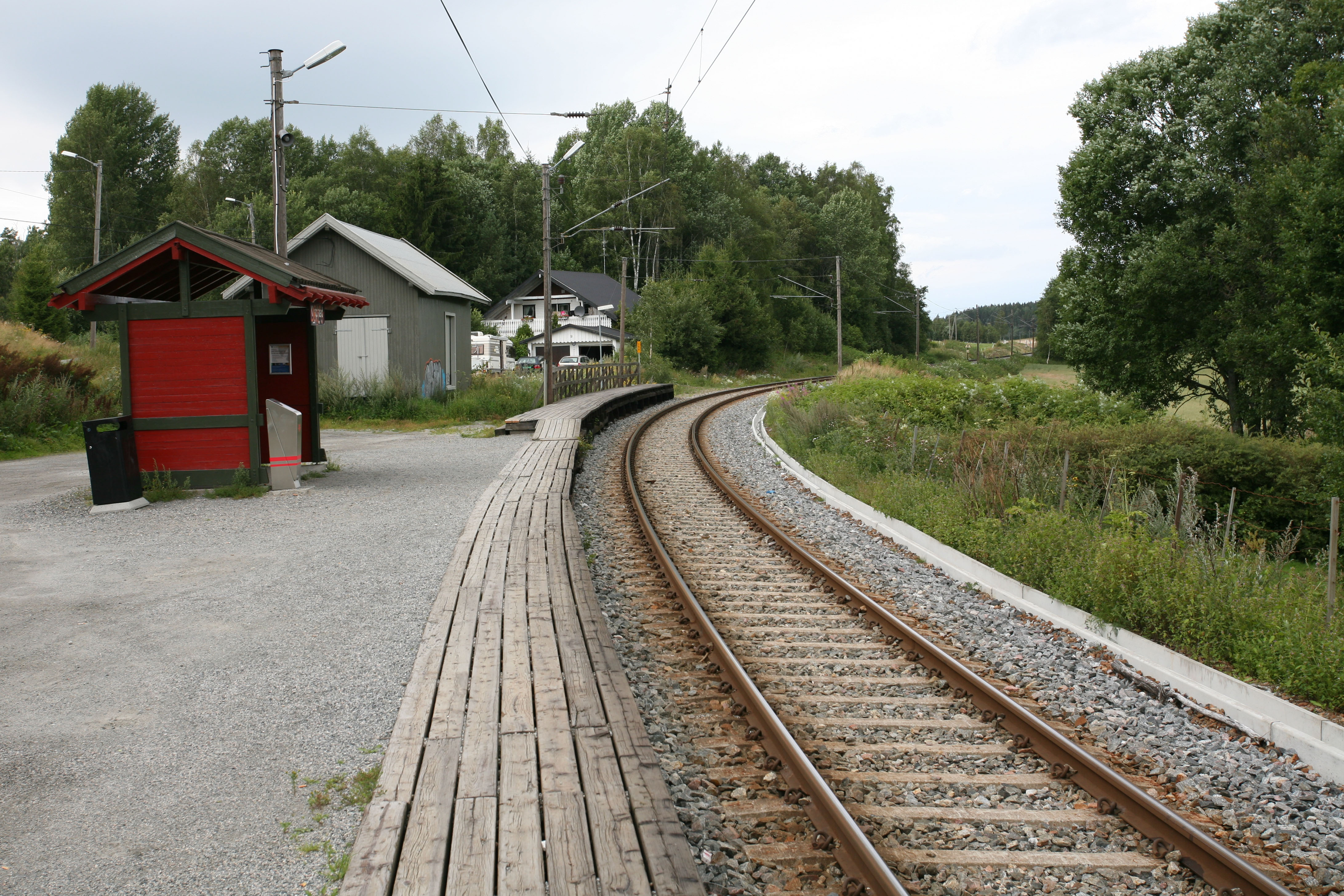

General information
- Location: Knapstad, Hobøl; Norway
- Coordinates: 59°37′28″N 11°01′58″E
- Owner: Bane NOR
- Operator: Vy
- Line: Eastern Østfold Line
- Distance: 41.79 km
- Platforms: 1

History
- Opened: 1912
Location

Knapstad Station (Norwegian: Knapstad holdeplass) is located at Knapstad in Hobøl, Norway on the Østfold Line. The railway station is served by the Oslo Commuter Rail line L22 from Oslo Central Station. The station was opened in 1912.

Preceding station			Following station
Tomter	Eastern Østfold Line		Spydeberg
Preceding station	Local trains		Following station
Tomter	R22	Oslo S–Mysen	Spydeberg
