= Myrvoll =

Myrvoll is a surname. Notable people with the surname include:

- Inge Myrvoll (1948–2020), Norwegian politician and trade unionist
- Ole Myrvoll (1911–1988), Norwegian professor in economy and politician
- Tone Tangen Myrvoll (born 1965), Norwegian deaf cross-country skier, orienteer, and runner
