= Greverud =

- Village
- Location in Norway Greverud (Norway)
- Coordinates: 59°46′30″N 10°48′05″E
- Country: Norway
- Region: Østlandet
- County: Akershus
- Municipality: Nordre Follo
- Time zone: UTC+01:00 (CET)
  - Summer (DST): UTC+02:00 (CEST)

Greverud is a village in Nordre Follo municipality in Akershus county, Norway. It is located south of Kolbotn, approximately 15 kilometres (9.3 mi) south of Oslo.

Greverud has around 4,500 inhabitants.

In the middle of Greverud is Greverudsenteret, with shops and restaurants. North of Greverudsenteret is Greverud church, a brick church built in 1967.

Next to Greverudsenteret is a mountain hall, built as a bomb shelter but in peace time containing tennis courts, beach volleyball courts, soccer field and bandy field. In addition, Multisportsenteret ABOX offers space for training strength, aerobic and spinning.

== History ==
Greverud (Greifarrud) farm was probably established during the early medieval era, presumably in the 11th century, after having been a part of the original farm of Fløysbonn, and later Sætre.

In 1289, Greverud (Greivarud in Follo) was leased from Duke Haakon Magnus (later king) to Arne Gasse. A leather document states that the king should receive back half of the farm after this had been cleared and built. Arne Gasse received the western part of the farm, with toll and fishing rights for the adjacent lake Gjersjøen.

Østre Greverud Gård (Eastern Greverud farm) was located centrally next to Kongeveien (The old Kings Road), and became a post handling site in 1672.

== Education ==
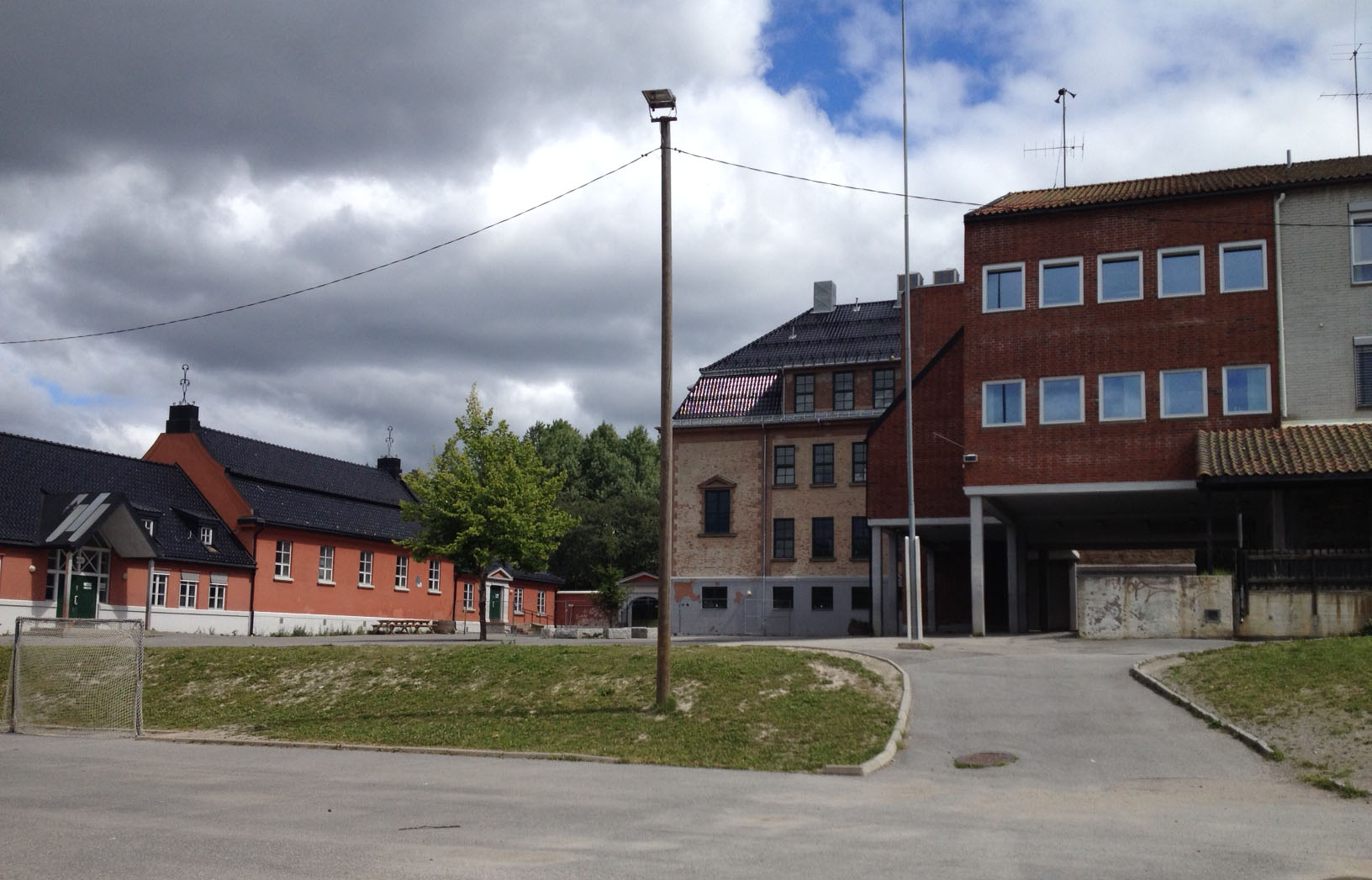
Greverud primary school

The secondary school, Flåtestad skole, was built in 2004. In 2006, the school had around 270 pupils.

The primary school Greverud skole, is located south of Greverud center. The oldest part was finished in 1921. Further parts were finished in 1971 and 1986.

== Communications ==
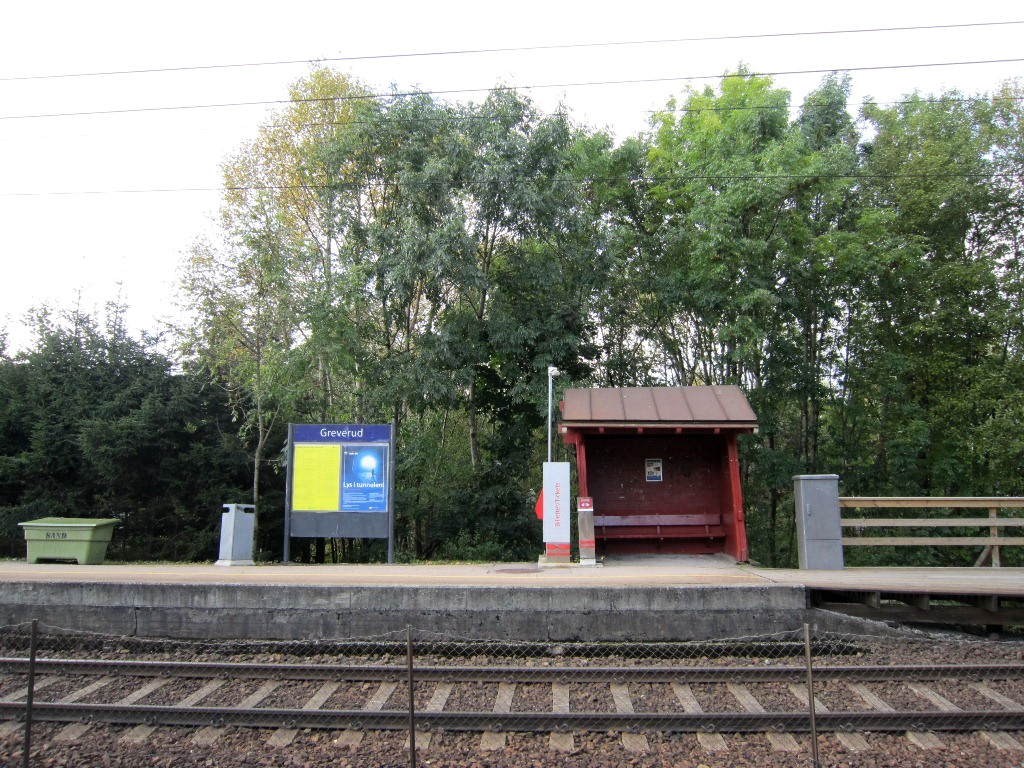
Greverud station

Greverud has a railway station along the Østfold Line, about 22 minutes by train from Oslo center. The station opened in 1939 and has railway connections to Oslo (north) and Ski (south). The area is served by bus line 81 (Vestbanen – Prinsdal – Greverud). Riksvei 152 is the main road through the area.

== Sports ==
Greverud is covered by the sports club Oppegård Idrettslag which has the following groups:

- Table tennis
- Soccer
- Friidrett
- Handball
- Oldemanslauget (a veteran club)
- Skiing
- Fitness
- Turn and children's sports

At Østre Greverud is an 18-hole golf course.

During winter, the golf course is used for skiing. Skiforeningen (the Norwegian skiing association) and the skiing group in Oppegård Idrettslag manage production of artificial snow as well as competitions and other arrangements.

The best-known athletes from Oppegård Idrettslag are Arne Post and Helene Olafsen.

== Culture ==
Nordre Greverusmannskor is a group of men trying to sing. The name is difficult to translate into English; suffice is to say that rus means "intoxication".
