= Stunner (Stone Age site) =

Archaeological site in Norway

Coordinates: 59.7422°N 10.9233°E

Stunner was the site of a Stone Age settlement located near Ski in Akershus County, Norway.

== Discovery ==
The settlement was first discovered during 1928 on the Stunner farm while Johannes Mikkelsen harvested potatoes. Mikkelsen was a well-read man with a great interest in archaeology. In February 1929 he first collected eight flint pieces for submission to the University of Oslo Museum of National Antiquities. Subsequently, Mikkelsen and his two sons, Hans and Sverre, submitted approximately 700 finds from their farm to the University Museum.

== Archaeological findings ==
The flint finds from the Stone Age settlement at Stunner reveal that the site was populated around 11,000 years ago. During the Upper Paleolithic era, pioneer settlers from the Ahrensburg culture tracked northward from the submerged North Sea continent and European mainland. Their primary prey was reindeer. At Stunner marine resources was also significant. The landscape the settlers encountered was dramatically different from the present. The sea level was 160 metres (520 ft) higher, and the fauna and flora resembled those of the arctic tundra and coastline.
