= Ski Station =

Railway station in Ski, Norway

Ski
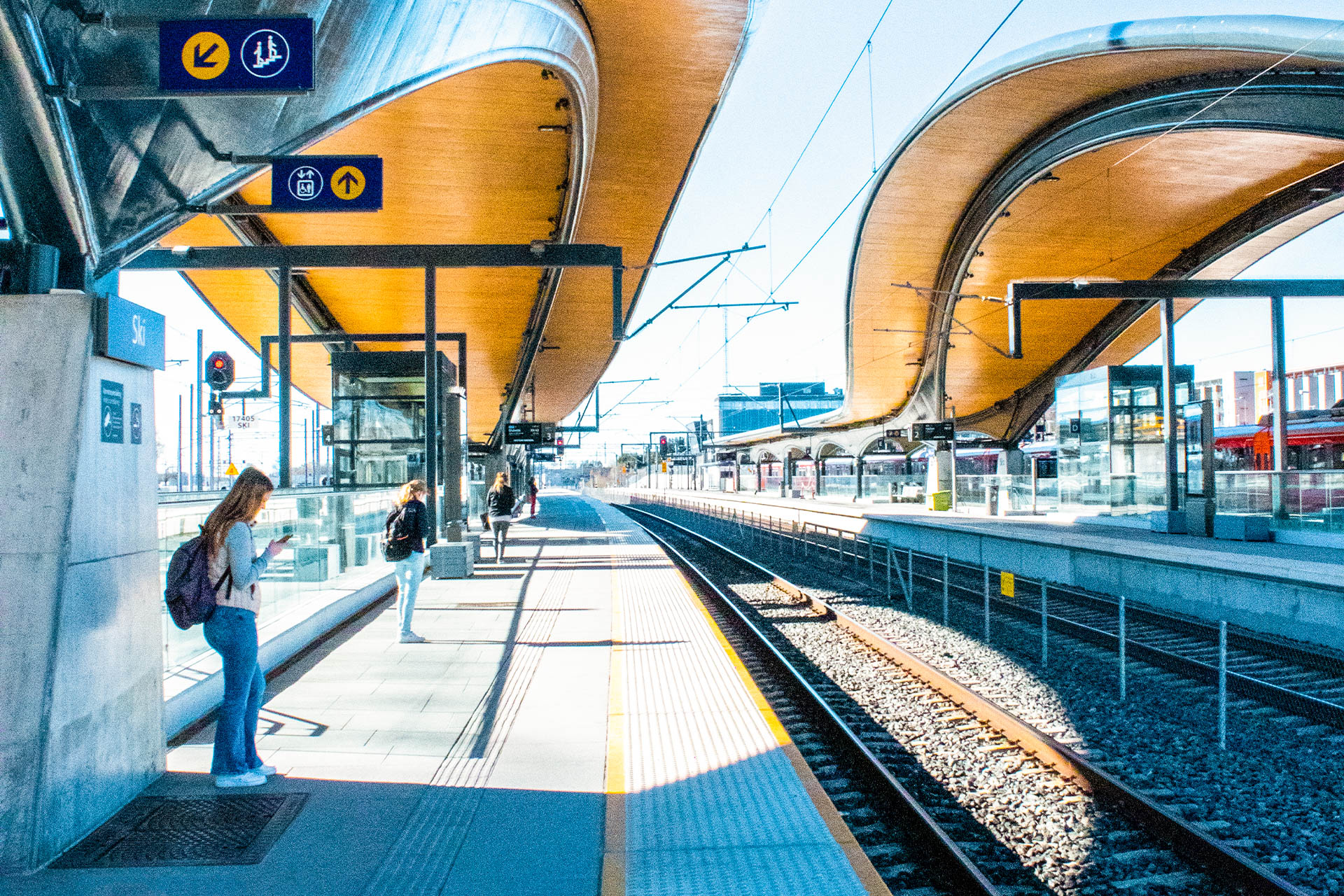
- The Ski Station in 2020

General information
- Location: Ski, Norway
- Coordinates: 59°43′10″N 10°50′06″E
- Elevation: 128.9 m (423 ft) amsl
- Owner: Bane NOR
- Operator: Vy
- Lines: Østfold Line; Follo Line; Eastern Østfold Line
- Distance: 24.31 km (15.11 mi)
- Connections: Bus: Ruter

Other information
- Station code: SKI

History
- Opened: 1879
Location

Ski Station (Norwegian: Ski stasjon) is a railway station located in Ski, Norway. It is located 24 kilometres (15 mi) from Oslo Central Station on the Østfold Line, at the point where the railway splits in two into an eastern and western line. It also serves as the terminal station of the Follo Line.

The station is served by all passenger trains on the Østfold Line and Follo Line. This includes regional services to Halden Station and Gothenburg Central Station, as well as Oslo Commuter Rail services to Moss Station and Mysen Station. Ski is also the terminal station for a commuter train service to Oslo that stops at all stations on the Østfold Line.

The restaurant at the station was taken over by Norsk Spisevognselskap on 1 January 1921, but leased to private operators. After an agreement with Norwegian State Railways, Spisevognselskapet renovated the restaurant and took over operations again on 1 January 1924. It was closed on 14 April 1946.

== New station ==
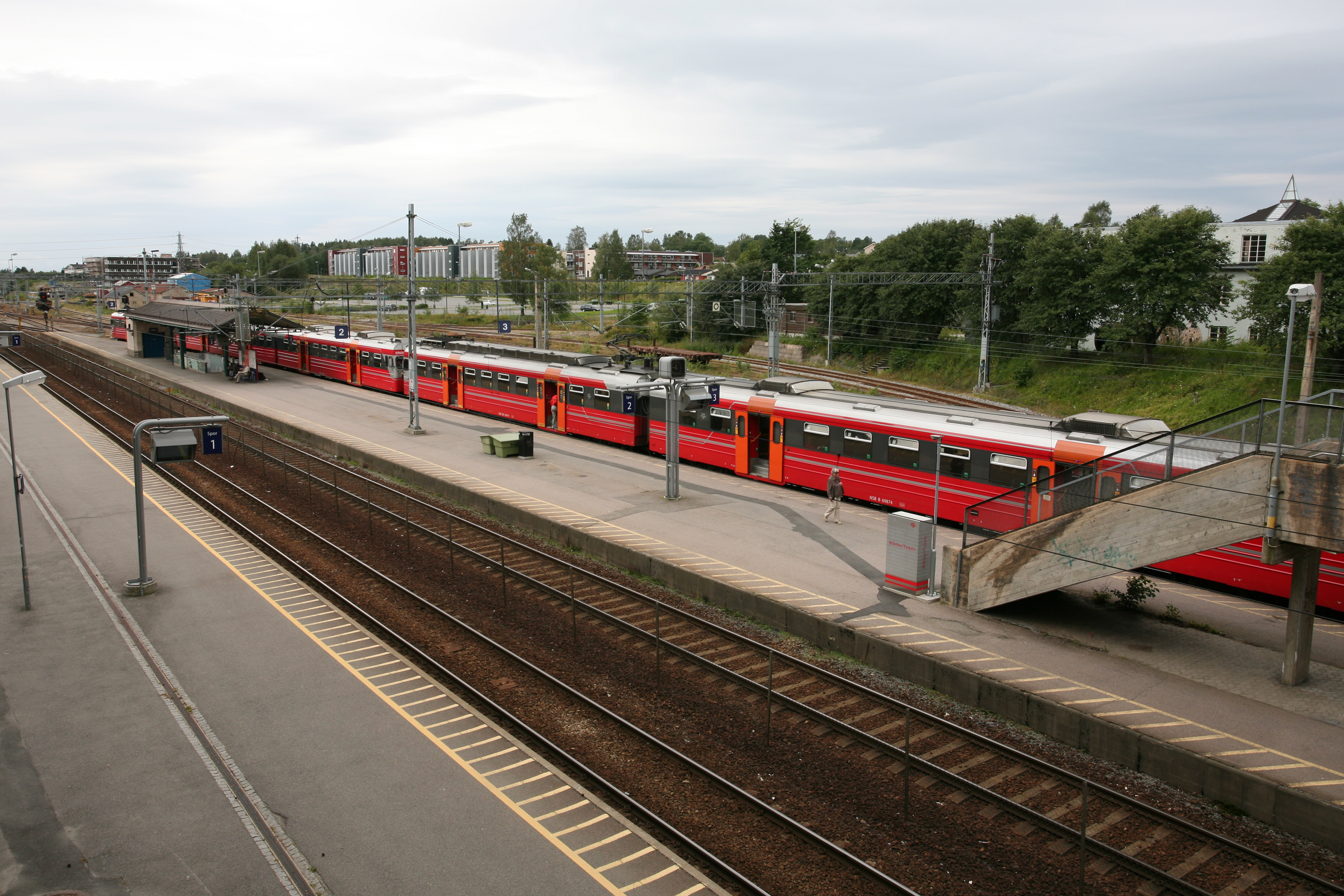
Oslo Commuter Rail Class 69 units at the Ski Station in 2007, before the station was rebuilt

In the mid 1990s, the Østfold Line between Ski to Moss was upgraded to a double-track and 160-kilometre-per-hour (100 mph) operation. Plans to build a new parallel double track from Ski to Oslo, the Follo Line, were proposed by the Norwegian National Rail Administration. The first stage of this involved building a new station at Ski. The new station includes six platforms. Parts of the new station were opened in August 2020, and the entire station was opened in August 2022.

Preceding station			Following station
Langhus	Østfold Line		Ås
Oslo S	Follo Line		—
—	Eastern Østfold Line		Kråkstad; Drømtorp
Preceding station	Regional trains		Following station
Oslo S	RE20	Oslo S–Halden-Gothenburg	Moss
Preceding station	Local trains		Following station
Langhus	L2	Stabekk–Oslo S–Ski	—
Vevelstad	L2	Oslo S–Kolbotn	—
Holmlia	R21	Oslo S–Moss	Ås
Kolbotn	R22	Oslo S–Mysen	Kråkstad
