= Ski, Norway =

Ski Municipality Ski kommune
- Municipality
- Ski
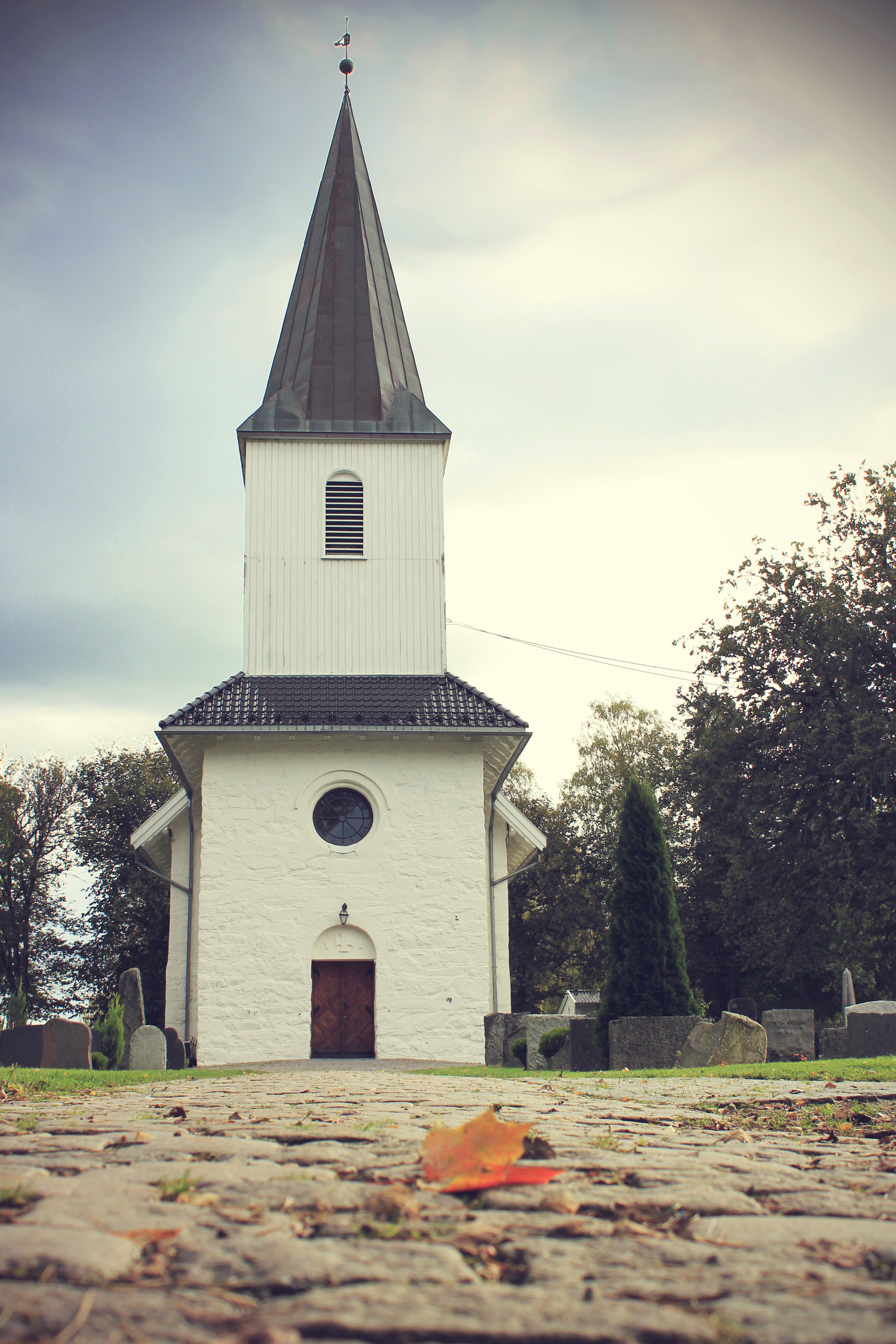
- Ski church

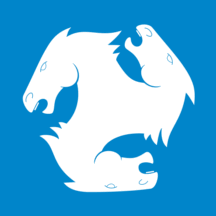
- Flag Coat of arms

- Ski within Akershus
- Coordinates: 59°44′31″N 10°53′38″E
- Country: Norway
- County: Akershus
- District: Nordre Follo
- Administrative centre: Ski

Area
  - Total: 165.5 km^{2} (63.9 sq mi)
  - Land: 161.5 km^{2} (62.4 sq mi)
  - Rank: #351 in Norway

Population (2013)
  - Total: 29,307
  - Rank: #31 in Norway
  - Density: 164/km^{2} (420/sq mi)
  - Change (10 years): ▲ +13.7%
- Demonym: Skiung

Official language
  - Norwegian form: Neutral
- Time zone: UTC+01:00 (CET)
  - Summer (DST): UTC+02:00 (CEST)
- ISO 3166 code: NO-0213

Ski (Norwegian pronunciation: [ʂiː]) is a town and former municipality in the new municipality (as of January 1, 2020) of Nordre Follo Municipality in the greater region Follo, in Akershus county, Norway.

Ski is the most populous and largest town in Follo, and serves as the de facto municipality center of Nordre Follo. Institutions such as the hospital, tingrett (district court), police station, and other regional public services, are located in and around the town of Ski.

== Etymology ==
The municipality of Ski inherited its name from the town of Ski, upon being instated as a separate municipality, with the town as its administrative centre. The town of Ski is named after a large farm called Skeidi (Old Norse: Skeiði). The word skeiði is a side form of skeið, meaning "running track for horse racing" – suggesting that there may have been such a track at the farm in medieval times.

Accordingly, and contrary to popular assumption, the name is a reference to horse racing, not skiing.

== History ==
Archeological remains from settlements dating as far back as 11,000 years have been found in the Ski and Ås areas. Stone Age tools are still being found when fields are ploughed, and Ski has more than 300 registered ancient historical artifacts.

From the Middle Ages and up to modern times the areas of Kråkstad and Ski were originally administered as medieval church parishes, and each have a medieval stone church from the 1150s. During the 19th century, Kråkstad was the political and administrative centre of the municipality.

On July 1, 1931, the rural, but rapidly growing municipality of Kråkstad was split into two separate municipalities. The village of Ski was chosen as the administrative centre of the northern part, thus giving its name to the new municipality. The village of Kråkstad remained the administrative centre of the southern part, retaining its original name.

By 1964 Ski had developed into a busy town and trading hub for the surrounding, rural areas. Ski municipality had by far outgrown its southern neighbour economically and population-wise. Consequently, on January 1, Kråkstad was officially absorbed into Ski municipality, ceasing to be a municipality of its own. Today, the name "Kråkstad" simply refers to the village, just southeast of the much larger town of Ski.

== Coat of arms ==
The current coat of arms was approved on December 19, 1986. It was based on a logo used since 1979. It was designed to reflect the original meaning of the name "Ski" – thus depicting three silver horse heads arranged in a triskelion on a blue background.

== Geography ==
Ski is located in Akershus county, south of Oslo. It borders Oppegård Municipality to the west, Enebakk Municipality to the east, Ås Municipality to the south-west and Hobøl Municipality to the south-east. Ski is an inland municipality and is separated from the Oslofjord by Oppegård and Ås.

The landscape is dominated by rolling hills, covered in forest and farmland interspersed with settlements. In fact, 102.12 of the total of 165.5 square kilometres of land area belonging to the municipality are forest. Apart from the town of Ski, other notable settlements are the villages of Kråkstad and Siggerud, and the larger, sub-urban area of Langhus.

Both major roads leading from Oslo through eastern Norway to Sweden, the E6 and E18, pass through Ski, as well as the main southbound railway line.

== Economy ==
Ski is traditionally a rural municipality, and agriculture is still prominent. However, its location at the centre of the district, with Norway's two most important main roads intersecting nearby and the main railway line passing through, has made it the commercial and transport hub of the region. This has drawn companies to set up headquarters, factories and logistics hubs in the area, boosting the economy.

Ski town is a regional passenger hub for the national rail service, Vy, and as much of Ski municipality is easily reachable by train or car from central Oslo, the number of people living in Ski and commuting to Oslo has increased rapidly over the last 30 years, and is set to continue increasing - as immigration and birthrates in the Oslo/Akershus region is strong and housing in Oslo proper is of limited availability - and therefore costly.

Ski town has retained its traditional status as a market town and trading hub, and is home to the largest shopping centre in the district and one of the largest in Norway – Ski Storsenter. Ski town is also the political and administrative hub of the Follo region, and the local police headquarter, hospital, and district court - as well as a number of inter-municipal services companies, are located there.

== Ethnicity and foreign minority ==
Number of minorities (1st and 2nd generation) in Ski by country of origin in 2017
Ancestry	Number
Poland	541
Sweden	390
Iraq	367
Kosovo	323
Pakistan	272
Somalia	221
Lithuania	202
Denmark	179
Iran	171
Eritrea	168
Vietnam	154
Germany	153

== Geology ==
Ski, as most of Follo, lies on ancient rock foundations. Throughout the local area from east to west there is a moraine left from the Ice age.

== Sports ==
There are numerous sports clubs in Ski municipality, covering a wide range of sports. Most are junior or amateur sports clubs. The best known sports team is the football team Follo FK, which is based in Ski town. Follo FK is a joint effort by a number of local sports clubs in the Follo district, in order to be able to field a national-level football team. Follo FK currently (2016) plays in the 2nd division of the national football league, having played both in the 1st division and in the 3rd division previously, and have played in the national cup finals twice. The local handball team Follo HK has played in the top division of both the women's and men's side.

== Notable people ==
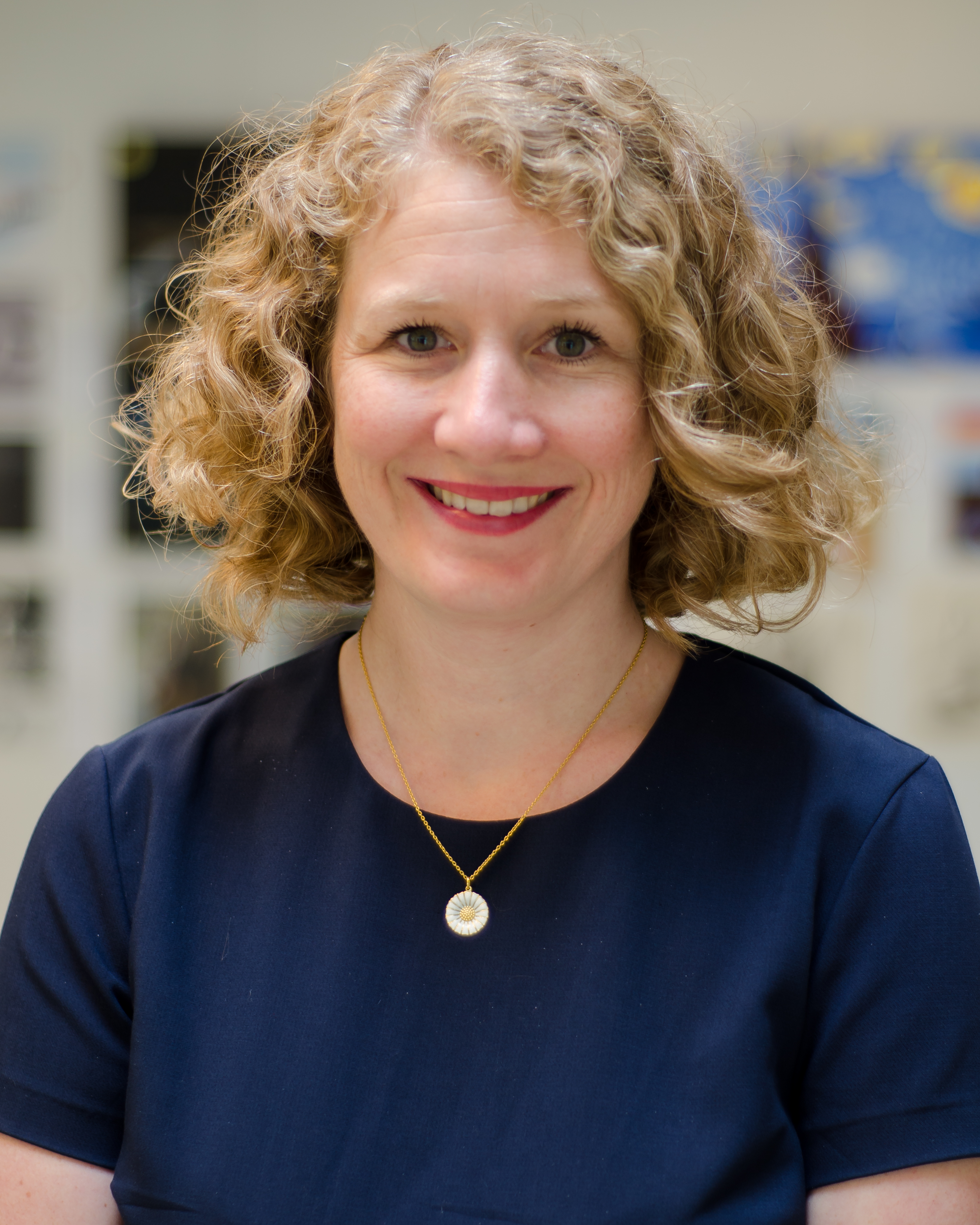
Tuva Moflag, 2017

- Borghild Holmsen (1865 in Kråkstad – 1938) a Norwegian pianist, music critic and composer
- Gunhild Ziener (1868 in Ski – 1937) a Norwegian politician and pioneer in Norway's women's movement
- Ingrid Bjoner (1927 in Kråkstad – 2006) a Norwegian operatic soprano, portrayed Wagnerian heroines
- Alf Magne Austad (1946–2013) a realist painter, lived in Ski
- Anne Kristine Linnestad (born 1961) a politician, Mayor of Ski, 2011 to 2015
- Trude Mostue (born 1968) a veterinary surgeon and TV presenter, brought up in Siggerud
- Martin Andresen (born 1977 in Kråkstad) a former footballer with 355 club caps and 43 for Norway
- Tuva Moflag (born 1979) a Norwegian politician, Mayor of Ski, 2015 to 2017
- Linn-Kristin Riegelhuth Koren (born 1984 in Ski) a retired handball player, 279 caps with Norway women and three time Olympic team medallist
- Fredric Aasbø (born 1985 in Ski) a professional drifter and stunt driver

== Twin towns and sister cities ==
Ski municipality is twinned with:

- Gladsaxe, Denmark
- Viimsi Parish, Estonia
- Solna, Sweden

== See also ==
- Stunner (Stone Age site)
