= Hauketo Station =

Railway station in Oslo, Norway

Hauketo
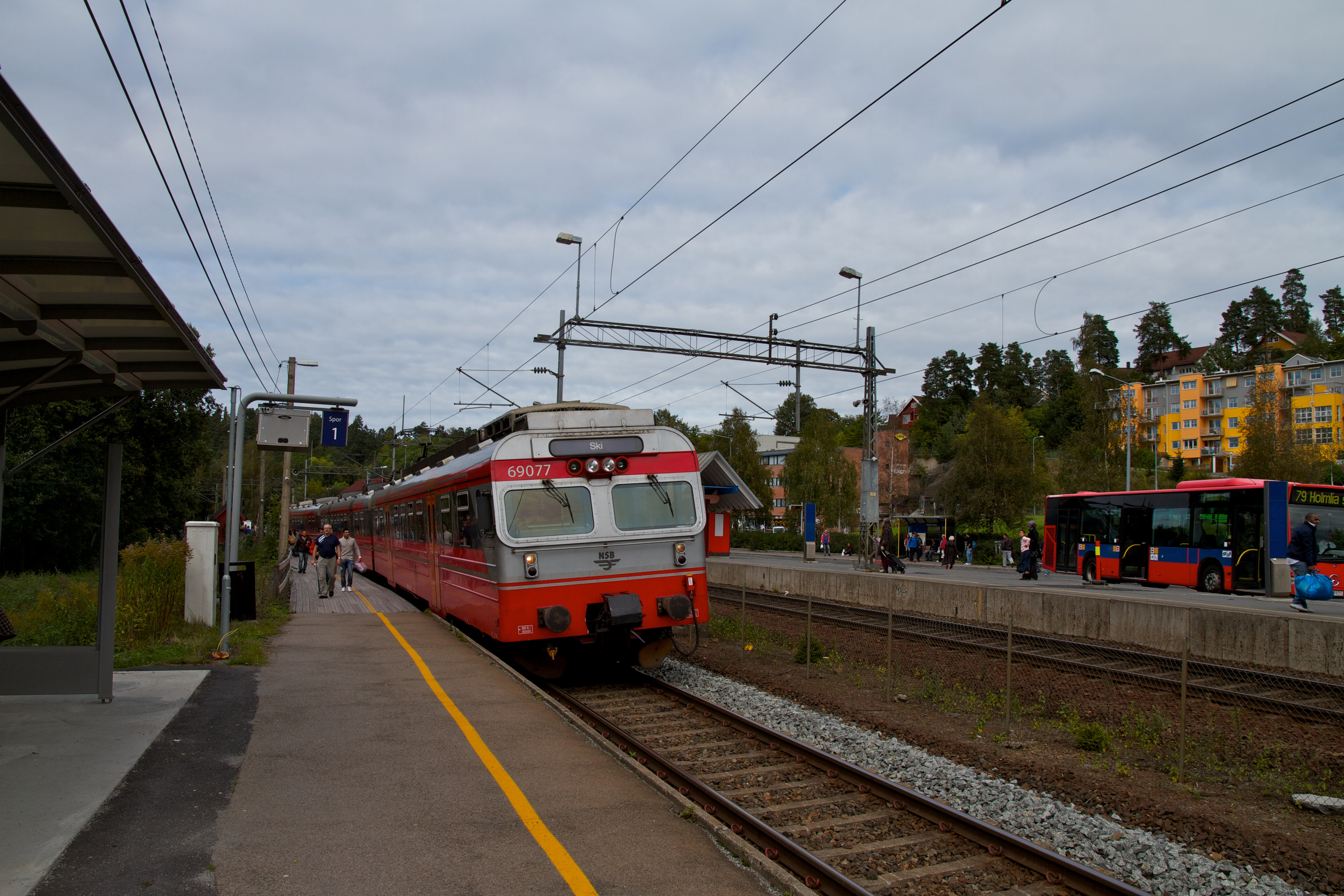

General information
- Location: Hauketo, Søndre Nordstrand, Oslo; Norway
- Coordinates: 59°50′46″N 10°48′11″E
- Elevation: 63.7 m (209 ft) AMSL
- Owner: Bane NOR
- Operator: Vy
- Line: Østfold Line
- Distance: 8.68 km (5.39 mi) from Oslo S
- Platforms: 2 side platforms
- Tracks: 2
- Connections: Bus: 73 Holmlia Stasjon – Brenna; 73X Mortensrud T 77 Holmlia Stasjon – Langteigåsen; 77X Bjørndal; 79 Åsbråten – Grorud T 81 Fløysbonn – Rådhuset; 87 Fugleåsen; 88 Hvervenbukta; 18N Åsbråten - Kringsjå; 81N Ski Stasjon - Rådhuset

Construction
- Parking: 100 spaces
- Cycle facilities: Yes
- Accessible: Only northbound platform
- Architect: NSB Arkitektkontor

Other information
- Fare zone: 1

History
- Opened: 15 February 1925
Location

Hauketo Station (Norwegian: Hauketo Stasjon) is a railway station on the Østfold Line. It is located in the Hauketo neighborhood in the Søndre Nordstrand borough of Oslo, Norway. Situated 8.68 kilometers (5.39 mi) from Oslo Central Station (Oslo S), it features two side platforms. Hauketo is served by the Line L2 of the Oslo Commuter Rail, providing two to four services each hour.

The station opened on 15 February 1925, after the Østfold Line had been moved to avoid the Ljan Viaduct. Its original wooden station building is now a pizzeria. The station has been unstaffed since 1980. Eight Ruter bus lines feed the station.

== History ==
When Østfold Line opened in 1879 it followed a more westerly right-of-way through Holm. The line passed over Ljansdalen on the Ljan Viaduct. The ground conditions were poor through Holm and the Norwegian State Railways therefore decided to build a new rote via Hauketo. This opened on 15 February 1925.

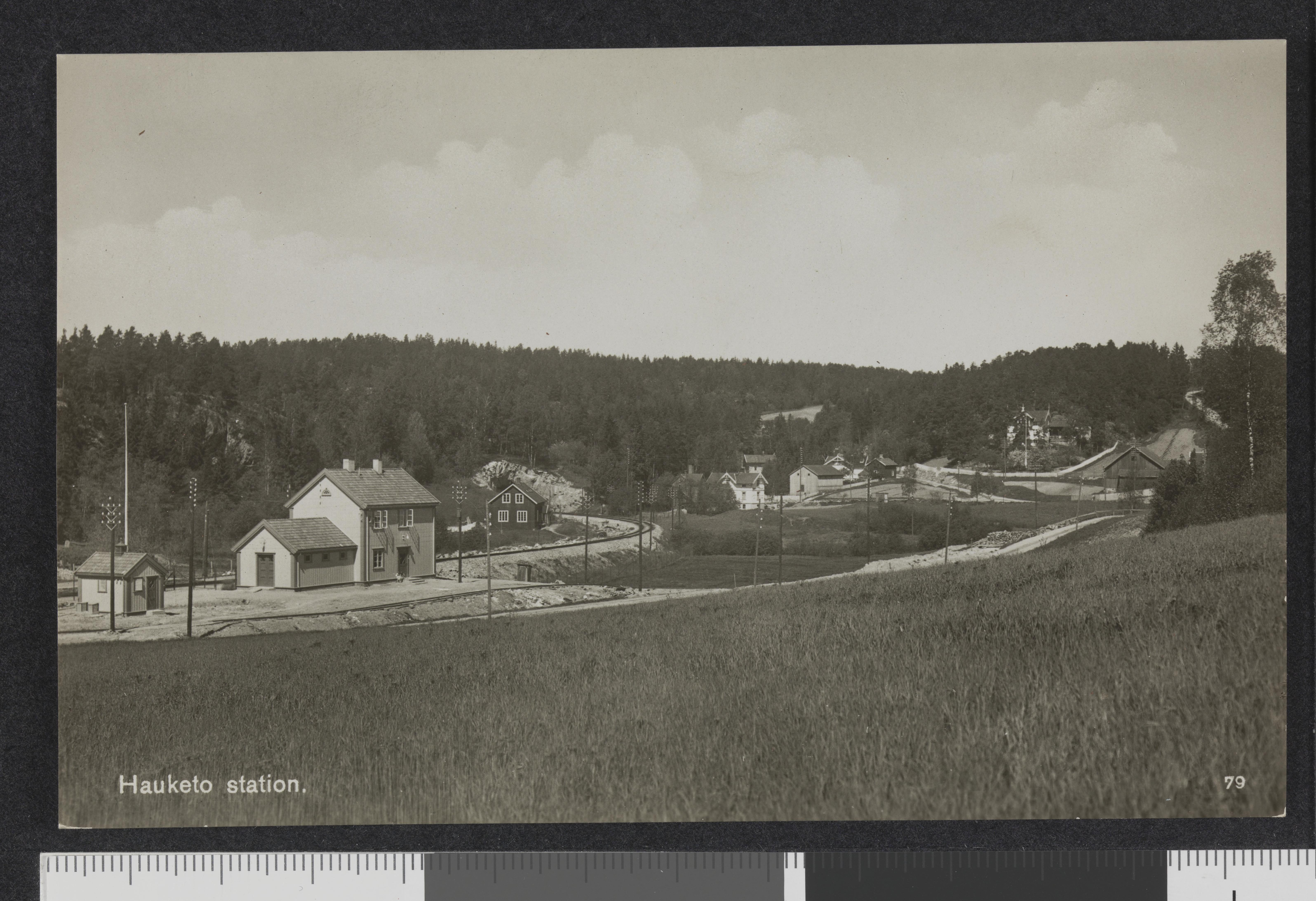
The station before the doubling of the track

The new route allowed the railway to establish a station at Hauketo, which opened on 15 February 1925. It initially only had a simple platform in each direction. A station building with a waiting room, post office and cargo ramp. Hauketo received some housing in the 1920s, but first during the late 1940s was there any large-scale construction in the former rural area. There were some condominiums, but the neighborhood consisted for the most part of single dwellings.

The train had a major competitor in a bus route. Prinsdalsruten was established in 1928 and started serving the Prinsdal area. It continued past Hauketo and then drove Mosseveien into the city center. It took the name Oslo og Folle Busstrafikk in 1964. The patronage shifted between the bus and trains. Mosseveien was increasingly congested and the 9 kilometers (5.6 mi) could often take 40 minutes. On the other hand, the railway was periodically subject to severe delays and cancellations and without a guaranteed seat in rush hour. Some use the bus as a feeder to the train, while others took it all the way to town.

Freight traffic to Hauketo was limited and mostly served a building materials outlet located at the station. The cargo annex of the building received an upper story with an apartment in 1967. The cargo handling was discontinued during the 1970s, and the ramp and cargo annex were both demolished. The station became unstaffed on 29 September 1980, losing the ticket office. The station building was later converted to a pizzeria. The station area was gradually redeveloped and received bus station.

== Facilities ==
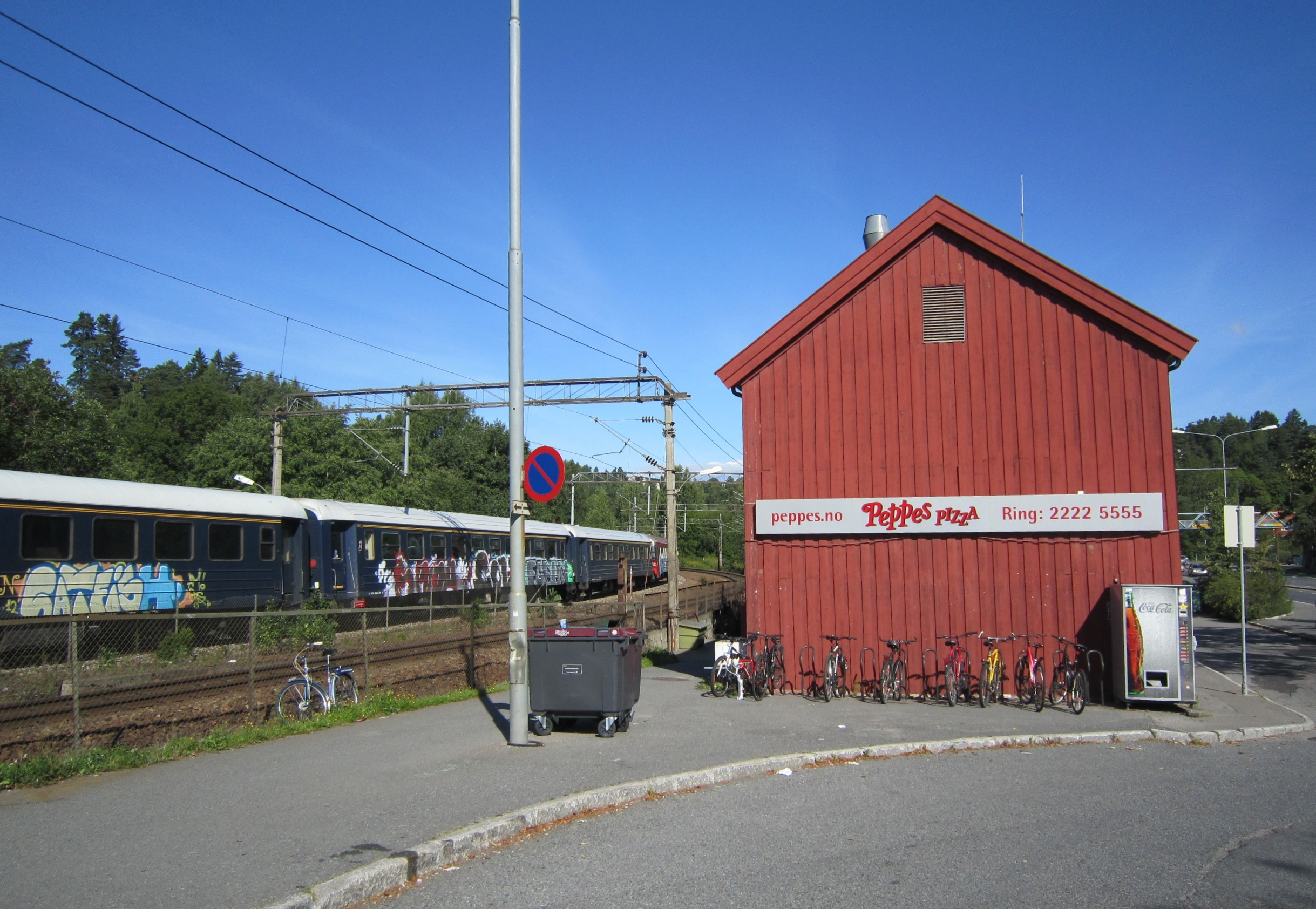
The station building is now used by Peppes Pizza

Hauketo Station is situated 8.68 kilometers (5.39 mi) from Oslo Central Station, at an elevation of 64 meters (210 ft) above mean sea level. The Østfold Line past Hauketo is double track and electrified, with the station partially located in a curve. The station has two 221-meter (725 ft) side platforms, which are 30 and 75 centimeters (12 and 30 in) tall, respectively. The southbound platform is mostly wooden. There is an underpass under the tracks. A street level there is a square with transfer to bus lines, as well as a taxi stand. There are also 100 parking spaces as well as bicycle parking. There are sheds on both platforms, as well as ticket machines.

The two-story station building is wooden with a gabled roof. The upper story was originally a residence, while the lower story featured passenger and cargo services and a waiting room. The building measures 103 square meters (1,110 sq ft). It currently features a Peppes Pizza outlet. There was also a single dwelling by the station which was part of the railway-owned property, with weatherboard siding.

== Service ==
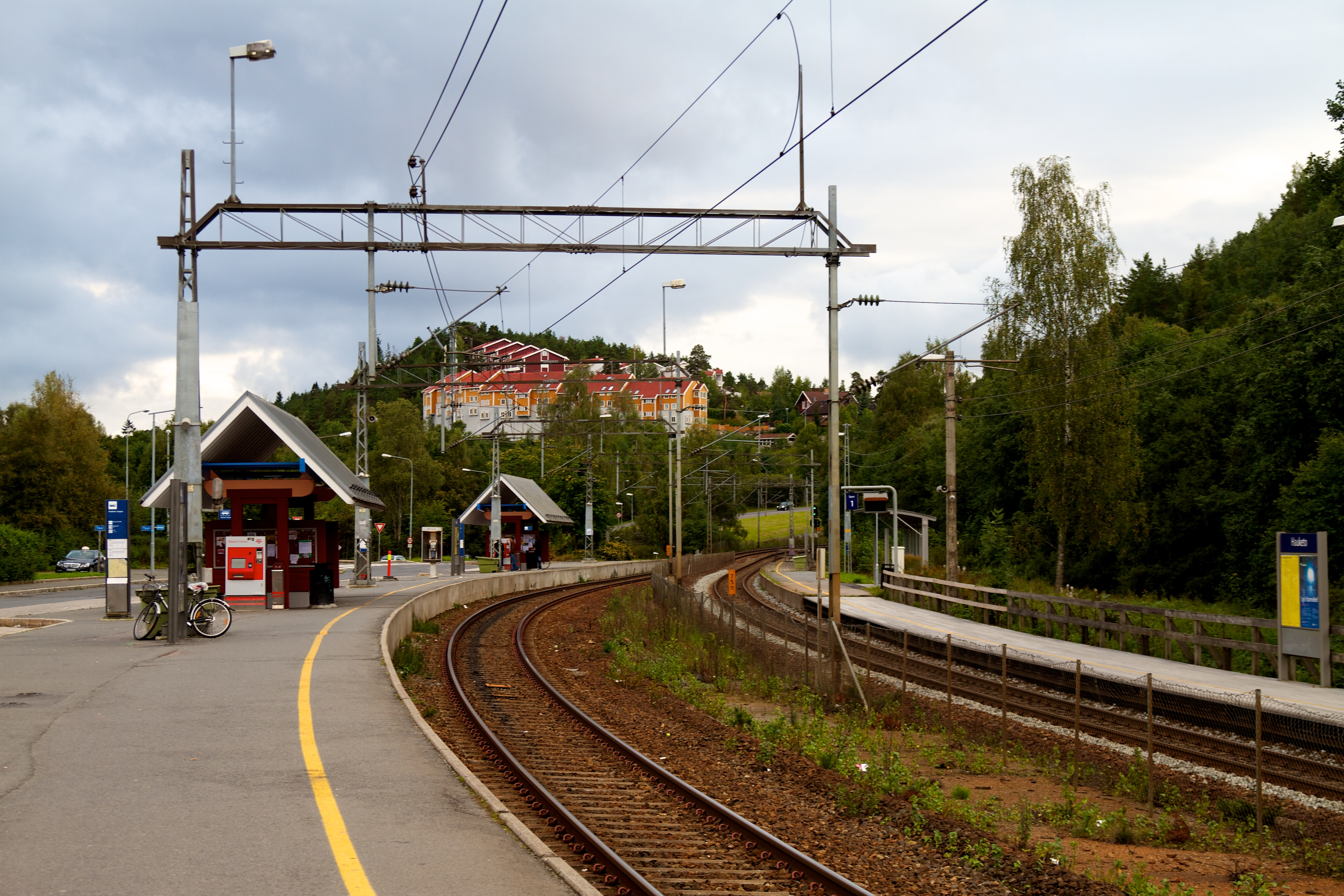
The station looking south

The station is served by line L2 of the Oslo Commuter Rail, operated by Vy. During regular hours this involves two trains per hour per direction which run from Ski Station via the Østfold Line to Oslo Central Station and onward to Skøyen Station. Rosenholm is also served by the L2x express services, providing extra services in rush hour. Travel time is 10 minutes to Oslo S and 24 to Ski.

Ruter operates three four bus services to the station. Line 76 is the only to terminate at the bus terminal, and runs diagonally across Nordstrand via Bøler to Helsfyr. Line 77 connects its to Holmlia Station in the one direction and through the Bjørndal area in the other. Line 79 crosses through the southern parts of Nordstrand, providing connections with the Ekeberg Line, the Lambertseter Line and the Østensjø Line. Line 81 feeds in from Prinsdal and upper sections of Oppegård.

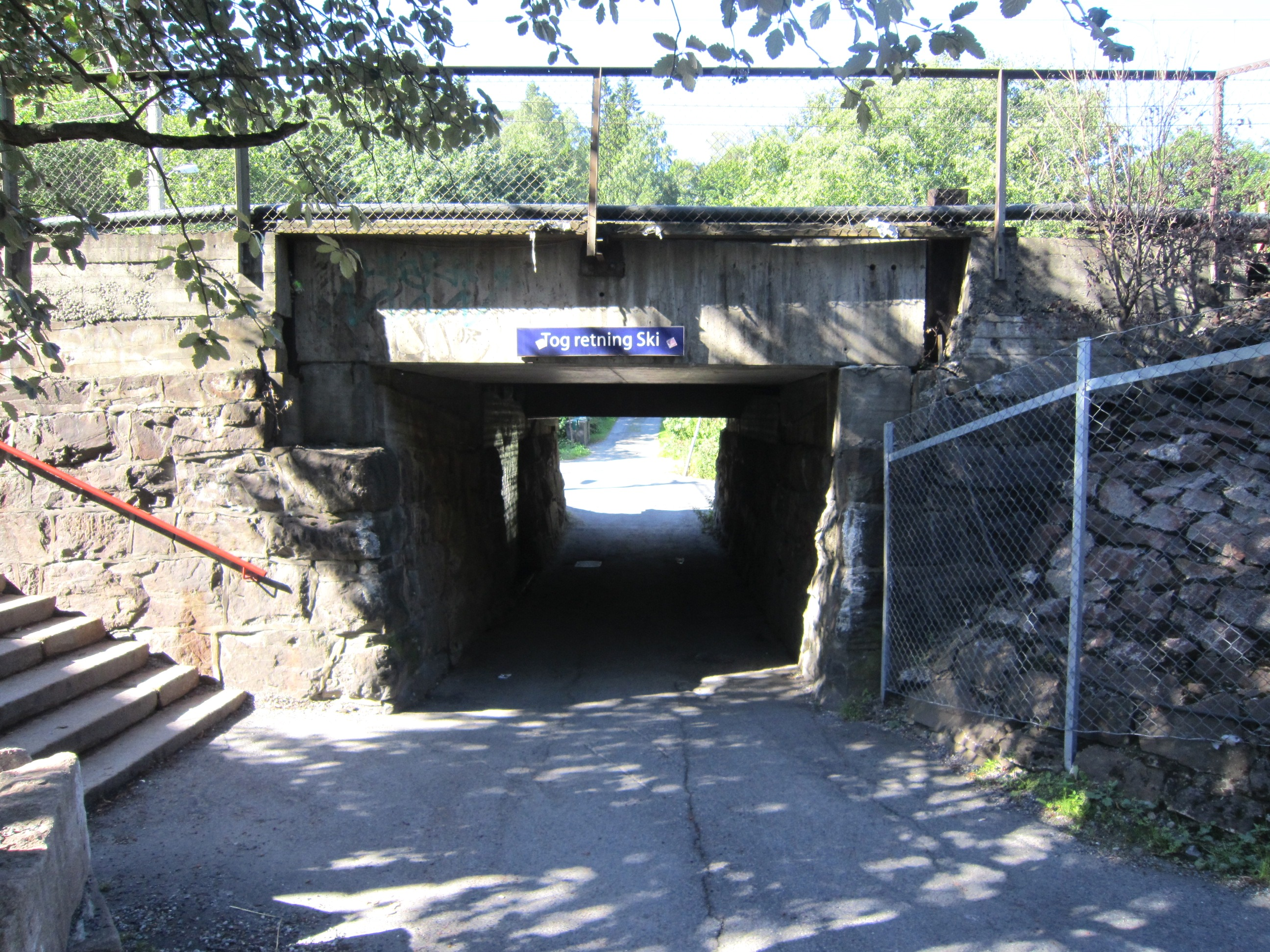
The underpass under the tracks

Despite the double track, the Østfold Line past Holmlia has reached its capacity limitation due to the mix of commuter, regional and freight trains. The Follo Line is scheduled for completion in 2021. It will allow regional trains to bypass the Østfold Line between Oslo and Ski, freeing up capacity. This will allow the L2 service to increase to at least four hourly services from the early 2020s.

== Future ==
In its long-term plans, Ruter has proposed that Hauketo be developed as a major interchange of traffic in Søndre Nordstrand. They have proposed that the Oslo Tramway's Ekeberg Line be extended one stop, from its current terminus at Ljabru to Hauteko. Two routes have been proposed, either along Ekebergveien, or in a tunnel further east. The extension will allow better correspondence between areas in southern Oslo. Financing has been secured through Oslo Package 3.

== Bibliography ==
- Bjerke, Thor; Holom, Finn (2004). Banedata 2004 (in Norwegian). Hamar / Oslo: Norwegian Railway Museum / Norwegian Railway Club. ISBN 82-90286-28-7.
- Langård, Geir-Widar; Ruud, Leif-Harald (2005). Sydbaneracer og Skandiapil – Glimt fra Østfoldbanen gjennom 125 år (in Norwegian). Oslo: Norwegian Railway Club. ISBN 978-82-90286-29-8.
- NSB Arkitektkontor (1992). NSBs bygningsregistrering – Oslo distrikt: Østfoldbanen, vestre linje Nordstrand–(Moss) (in Norwegian). Oslo.

Preceding station			Following station
Ljan	Østfold Line		Holmlia
Preceding station	Local trains		Following station
Ljan	L2	Stabekk–Oslo S–Ski	Holmlia
Oslo S	L2	Oslo S–Kolbotn	Holmlia
