= Rosenholm Station =

Railway station in Oslo, Norway

Rosenholm
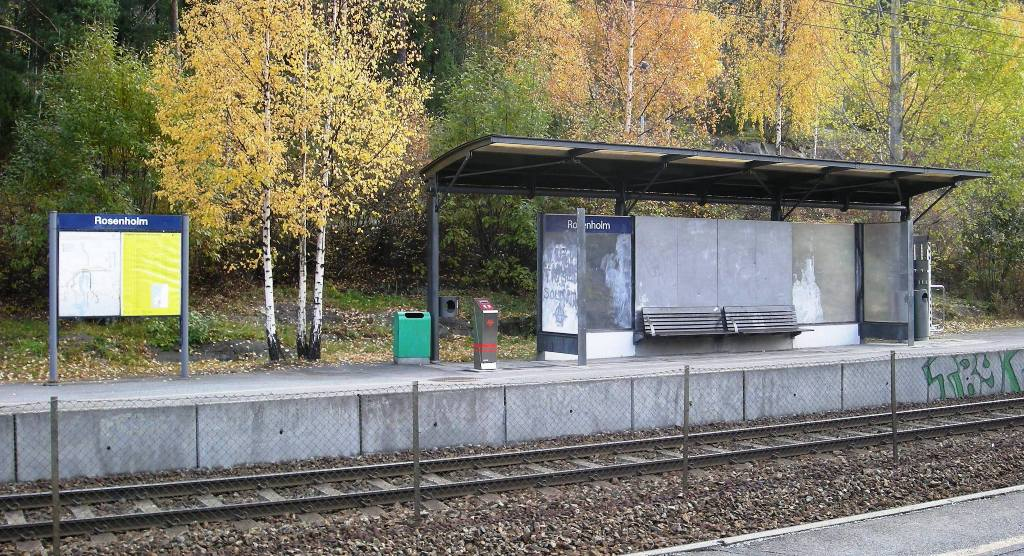

General information
- Location: Holmlia, Søndre Nordstrand, Oslo; Norway
- Coordinates: 59°49′24″N 10°47′52″E
- Owner: Bane NOR
- Operator: Vy
- Line: Østfold Line
- Distance: 11.35 km (7.05 mi) from Oslo S
- Platforms: 2

History
- Opened: 1 July 1988
Location
- Location within Akershus

Rosenholm Station (Norwegian: Rosenholm holdeplass) is a railway station on the Østfold Line located in the Holmlia neighborhood in the Søndre Nordstrand borough of Oslo, Norway. Situated 11.35 kilometers (7.05 mi) from Oslo Central Station (Oslo S), it features two side platforms. Rosenholm is served by the L2 line of the Oslo Commuter Rail. It features a major park and ride parking lot, but does not have a significant population near by.

== History ==
The railway past Rosenholm opened on 5 June 1873. It was doubled 15 December 1936 and electrified on 18 January 1937. Holmlia was established as a suburb in the 1970s, although it had been served by a station since 1932. Holmlia Station served the northern part of the suburb well and was moved 200 meters (660 ft) north and received a new structure from 2 June 1982. The Rosenholm area, albeit on the Oppegård side, was selected as the site of the Norwegian head offices for IBM, who opened their complex in 1987. The station is named for a smallholding which was previously situated northwest of the station.

Rosenholm Station was established with two goals in mind. The first was creating an efficient park and ride station for commuters from Follo and Østfold. The second was to target IBM employees. The station was situated too far from the residential area to be of much value for the residents at Holmlia. Proposals for a station at Rosenholm were first put forward in 1976, but at the time the Norwegian State Railways concluded that there would not be sufficient ridership from the station. By 1987 the number of residents and work places had increased sufficiently that the agency reconsidered. The station opened on 1 July 1988, after a large parking facility with 250 spaces built at the site. The site was chosen because it was immediately within the city limits of Oslo, and thus only have to pay an Oslo fare. It was also situated before Mosseveien on E18 where the greatest congestion occurs. The plans called for up to 800 parking places to be built in the future. Investments totaled 2.6 million Norwegian kroner.

Rosenholm never met its main targets, never becoming particularly popular with commuters nor with IBM employees. In later years the popularity has risen and by 2016 the Norwegian National Rail Administration was working with plans to expand the parking space.

== Facilities ==
Rosenholm Station is situated 11.35 kilometers (7.05 mi) from Oslo Central Station, immediately north of the municipal boundary between Oslo and Oppegård. The Østfold Line past Grorud is double track and electrified. The station features two 222-meter (728 ft) side platforms, 67 and 69 centimeters (26 and 27 in) tall, each with a shed. There is an overpass between the tracks to the south of the platforms. There are ticket machines and a bicycle shed at the station, as well as free parking for 212 cars.

== Service ==
The station is served by line L2 of the Oslo Commuter Rail, operated by Vy. During regular hours this involves two trains per hour per direction which run from Ski Station via the Østfold Line to Oslo Central Station and onward to Skøyen Station. Rosenholm is not served by the express services. Travel time is 14 minutes to Oslo S and 20 to Ski.

== Bibliography ==
- Bjerke, Thor; Holom, Finn (2004). Banedata 2004 (in Norwegian). Hamar / Oslo: Norwegian Railway Museum / Norwegian Railway Club. ISBN 82-90286-28-7.
- Langård, Geir-Widar; Ruud, Leif-Harald (2005). Sydbaneracer og Skandiapil – Glimt fra Østfoldbanen gjennom 125 år (in Norwegian). Oslo: Norwegian Railway Club. ISBN 978-82-90286-29-8.

Preceding station			Following station
Holmlia	Østfold Line		Kolbotn
Preceding station	Local trains		Following station
Holmlia	L2	Stabekk–Oslo S–Ski	Kolbotn
