= Holmlia Station =

Railway station in Oslo, Norway

Holmlia
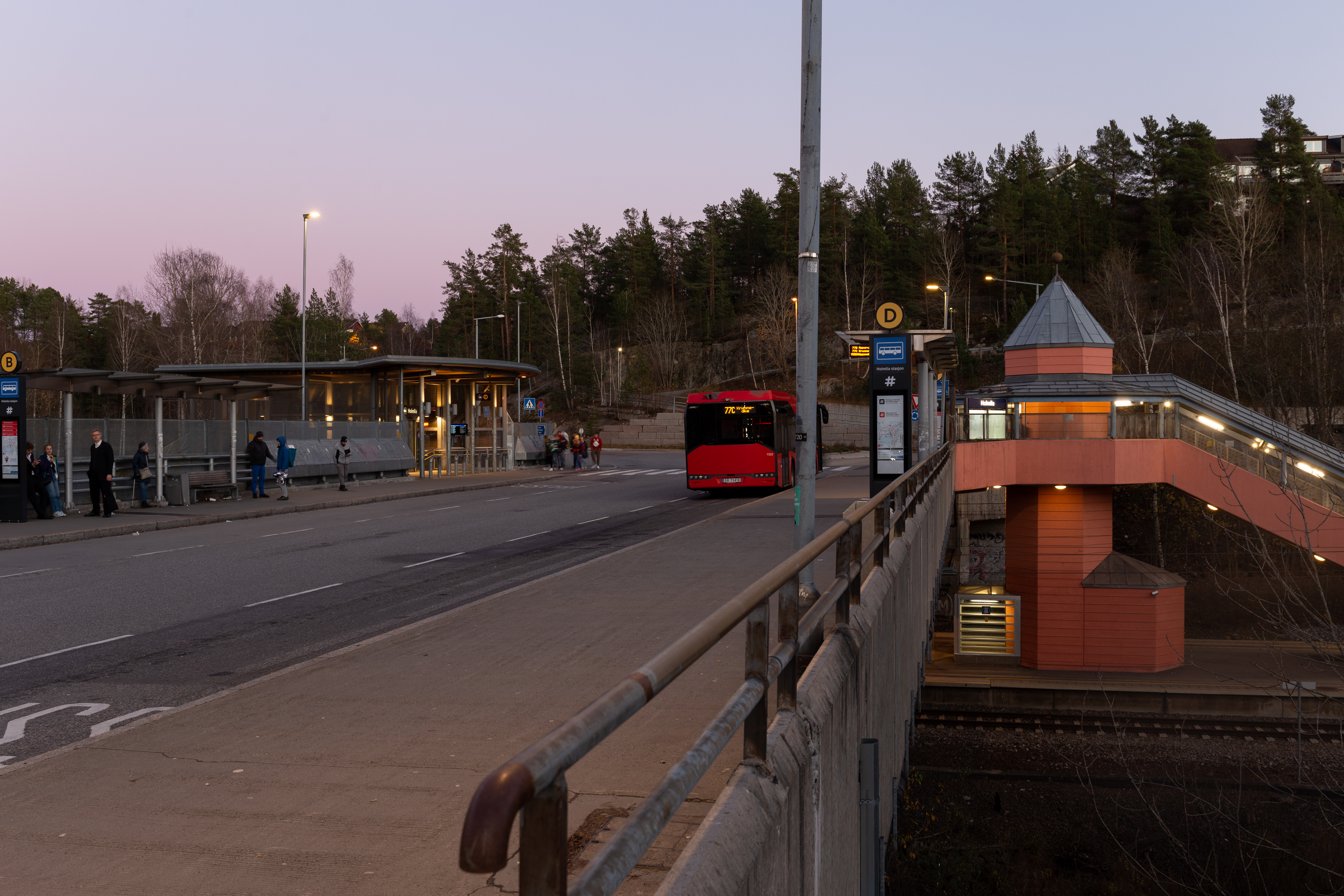

General information
- Location: Holmlia, Søndre Nordstrand, Oslo; Norway
- Coordinates: 59°50′05″N 10°47′49″E
- Owner: Bane NOR
- Operator: Vy
- Line: Østfold Line
- Distance: 10.20 km (6.34 mi) from Oslo S
- Platforms: 1 island platform
- Tracks: 2
- Connections: Bus: Ruter; 73 Brenna; 77 Langteigåsen; 77B Asperudåsen; 77C Krummedike; 79 Åsbråten - Grorud T 80E Åsbråten - Rådhuset; 18N Åsbråten - Kringsjå; 83N Fløysbonn - Rådhuset

Construction
- Architect: Arne Henriksen

Other information
- Fare zone: 1

History
- Opened: 1932
- Rebuilt: 1982, 2012
Location
- Location within Akershus

Holmlia (Norwegian: Holmlia holdeplass) is a railway station on the Østfold Line. It is located in the Holmlia neighborhood in the Søndre Nordstrand borough of Oslo, Norway. Situated 10.20 kilometers (6.34 mi) from Oslo Central Station (Oslo S), it features an island platform with two access superstructures. Holmlia is served by the L2, L2x and L21 lines of the Oslo Commuter Rail, providing three to five services per hour.

The station opened in 1932. Development of the area started in the 1970s, resulting in an all-new station opening in 1982. Arne Henriksen designed its award-winning superstructure. Holmlia has since become among the country's busiest commuter stations, resulting in a northern accessway being built in 2012. Eight Ruter bus lines feed the station, including morning bus and two night buses.

== History ==
When Østfold Line opened in 1879 it followed a more westerly right-of-way through Holm. The line passed over Ljadalen on the Ljan Viaduct. The ground conditions were poor through Holm and the Norwegian State Railways therefore decided to build a new rote via Hauketo. The new route resulted in the opening of a station. Locals proposed that the station take the name Holm, which the area was known as at the time. NSB rejected this, stating that there was already a Holm Station on the Vestfold Line. They proposed instead that the name Lia could be used, after the former croft at the site. In the end they settled for both—Holmlia. The line past the station received double track on 15 December 1936, followed by electrification on 18 January 1937.

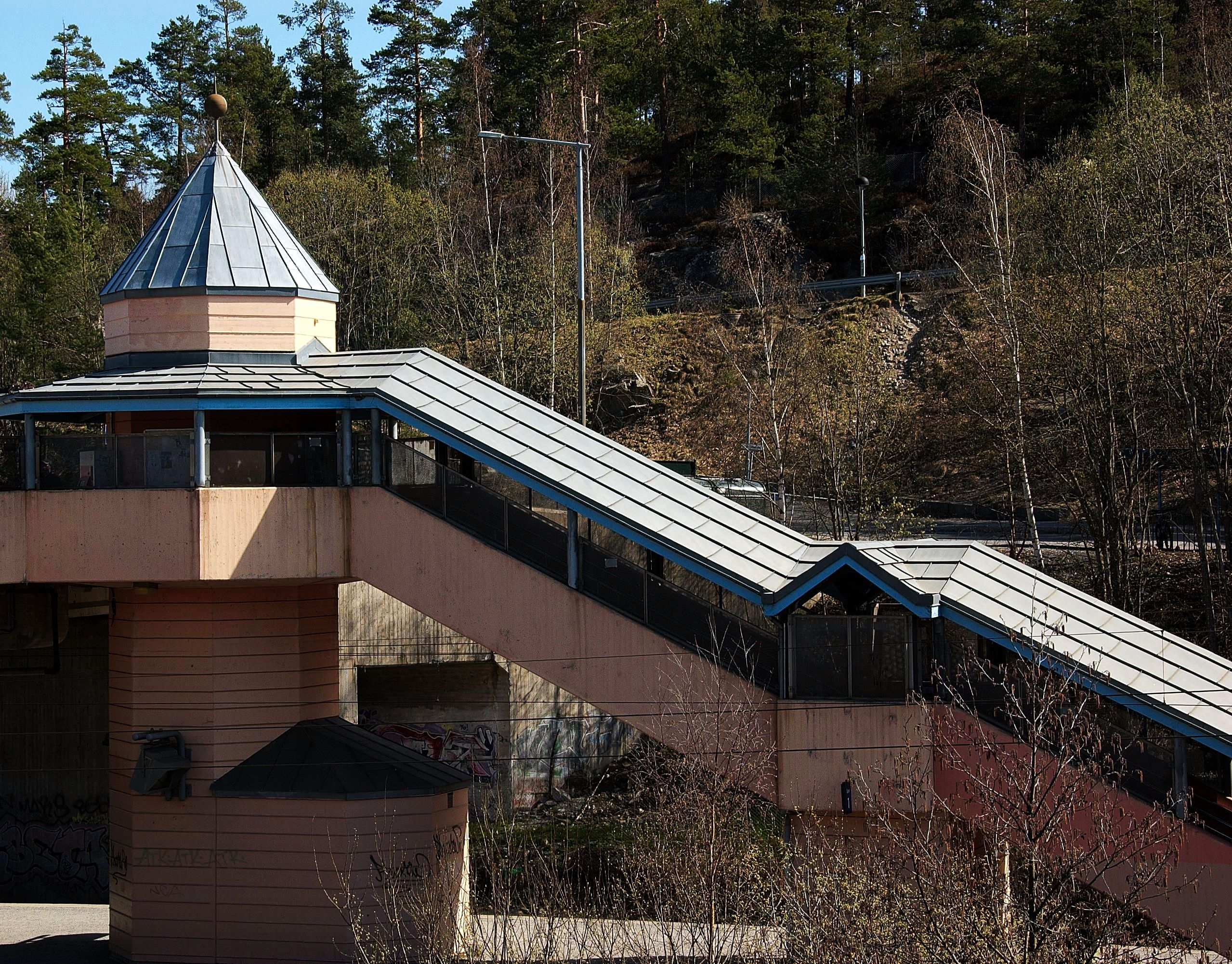
Henriksen's superstructure

Development of the Holmlia area started in 1970, following the construction of a cluster of single dwellings in the 1960s. By the 1980s the population had reached such a level that the simple station from 1932 could no longer handle the ridership. A new station was therefore built, 200 meters (660 ft) north of the former. The station was placed under an overpass, allowing for easier access and better transfer to buses. The station opened on 2 June 1982.

NSB started large-scale unstaffing of its stations from the 1970s, following the introduction of centralized traffic control. This led to a paradigm shift in the way new station were designed. There was no longer a need for a station building. Instead focus was on larger platforms to handle many travelers, better access and large roofed areas where passengers could wait. Holmlia was the first major project of this kind in Norway and represented a trend where suburbs with high ridership received stations with high throughput. Arne Henriksen at NSB Arkitektkontor was selected as the head architect, and Holmlia became his breakthrough. He would continue to dominate railway architecture in Norway the next two decades. Holmlia Station won him the Houen Foundation Award in 1988.

By the 2010s the amount of traffic at Holmlia was so high that access to the platforms had become a bottleneck during rushhour. Holmlia had become one of the busiest commuter stations in the country. The Norwegian National Rail Administration therefore decided to also build an access structure to the northern side of the platforms. Another concern was to spread out passengers more throughout the platform to speed boarding times. The platform height was raised from 70 to 76 centimeters (28 to 30 in) to allow for step-free access to trains. The art stone which was previously located at the northern end was moved to the south, where the disused kiosk was moved. Meanwhile, Oslo Municipality expanded the overpass over the station, to give room for more space for buses. The new section was designed by Linje Arkitekter. The new facilities opened on 7 May 2012. The southern platform structures were renovated in 2016. As the superstructure is listed, the work largely consisted of retouching the existing design, as well as adding an elevator.

== Facilities ==
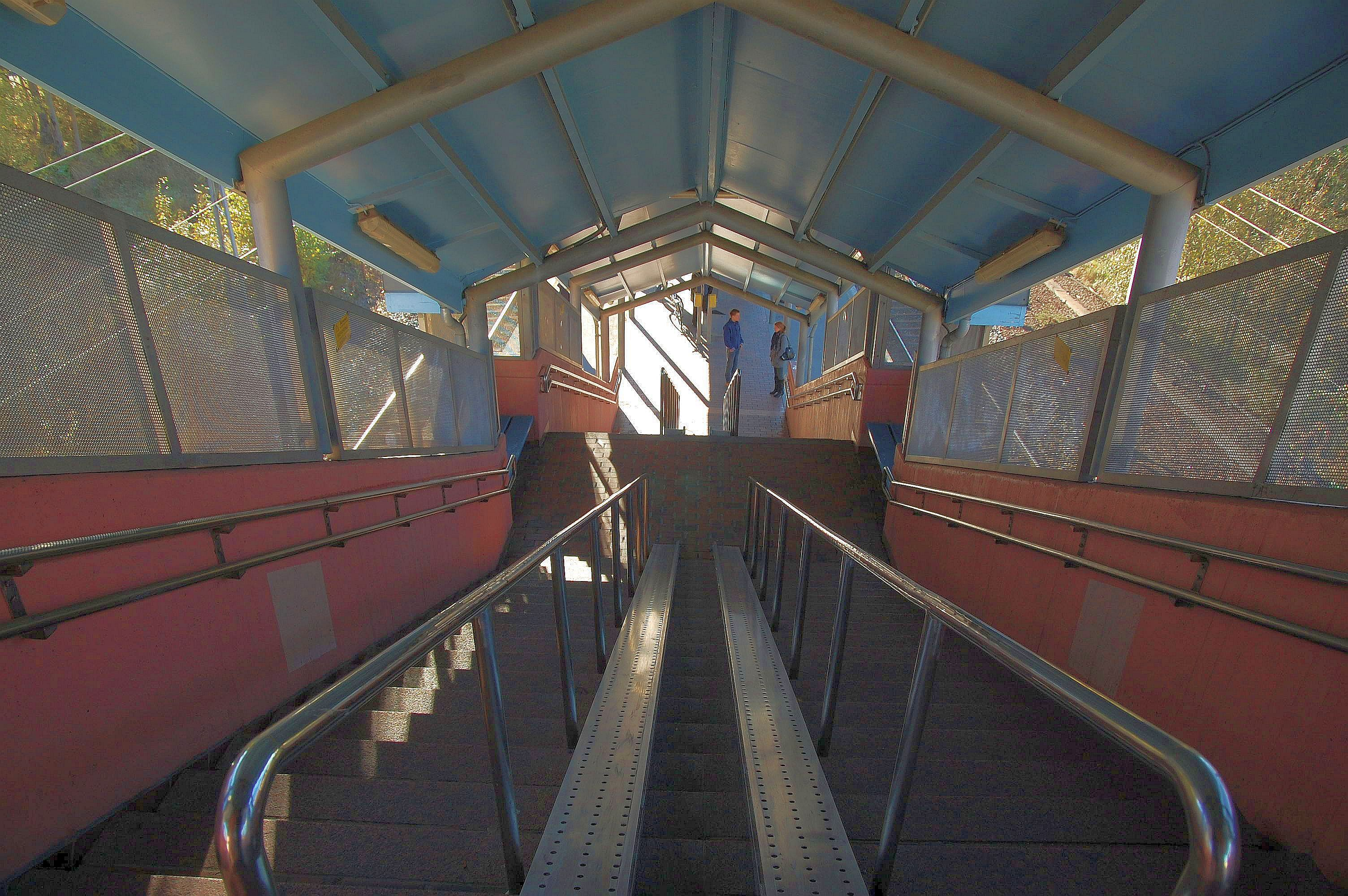
Stairs on the southern side

Holmlia Station is situated 10.20 kilometers (6.34 mi) from Oslo Central Station, in the Holmlia neighborhood. The Østfold Line past Holmlia is double track and electrified. The station has a 220-meter (720 ft) island platform, which is 76 centimeters (30 in) tall.

The southern part of the station consists of a superstructure which provides access from the overpass. Designed by Arne Henriksen, it has a unique shape and design, inspired by Aldo Rossi. Henriksen's superstructure is listed as a cultural heritage. The unique design of the station has made it a local landmark and it has been featured among other things in a borough logo. The northern part has an access superstructure made of steel and hardened glass, chosen to be resistant against vandalism. Both accesses have an elevator and stairs.

At street level there is a square with transfer to bus lines, as well as a taxi stand. Paid parking is possible at Holmlia Senter. The line has been designed so that Holmlia has good access by buses, while Rosenholm Station to the south serves as the main park and ride station.

== Service ==
The station is served by line L2 of the Oslo Commuter Rail, operated by Vy. During regular hours this involves two trains per hour per direction which run from Ski Station via the Østfold Line to Oslo Central Station and onward to Stabekk Station. Holmlia is also served by the L2x express services, providing extra services in rush hour. Travel time is 12 minutes to Oslo S and 22 to Ski. In addition, the L21 services, which run otherwise direct from Oslo to Ski and onward along the Eastern Østfold Line, call at Holmlia once per hour.

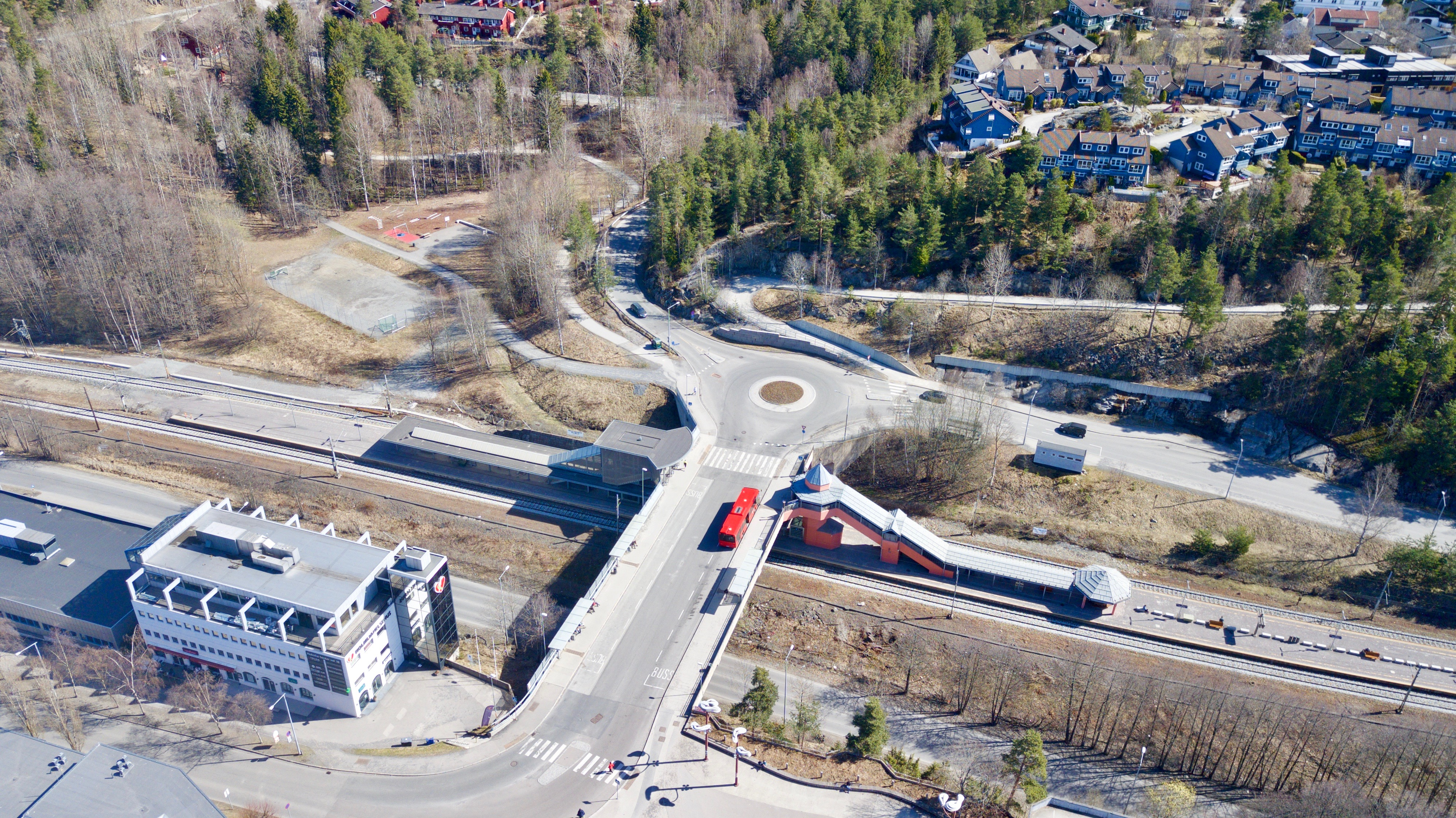
The station area seen from above.

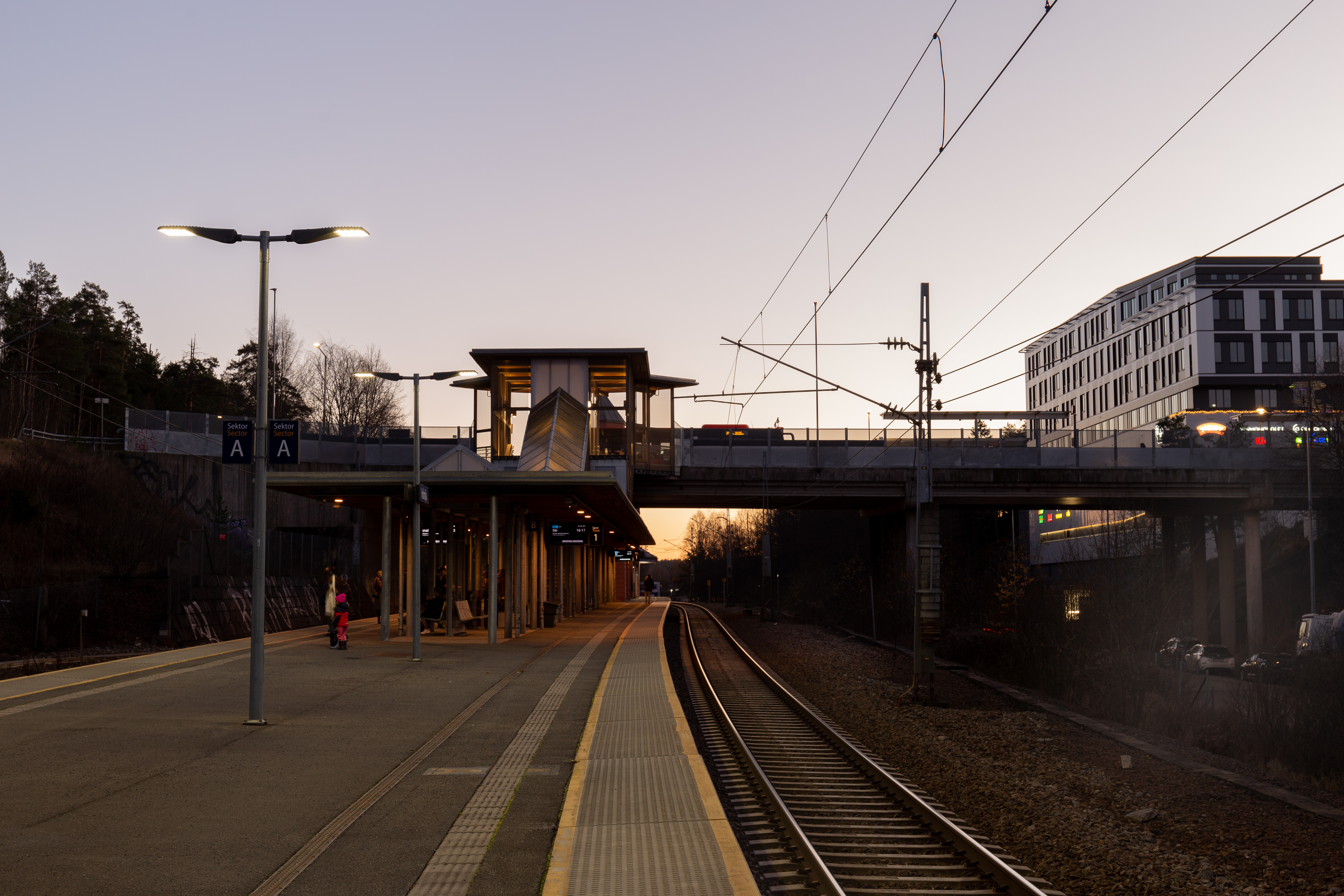
Station from below with Holmlia mall in the background

Ruter operates eight bus services to the station. Line 77 connects it to Hauketo Station and onwards to the Bjørndal area. Line 79 crosses through the southern parts of Nordstrand, providing connections with the Ekeberg Line, the Lambertseter Line and the Østensjø Line, and also connects Holmlia Station to the Åsbråten area southwest of the station. The station has been classified as a "typical walking-station", in which seventy to eighty percent of the ridership walk to the station. Bus ridership is only eleven percent.

Despite the double track, the Østfold Line past Holmlia has reached its capacity limitation due to the mix of commuter, regional and freight trains. The Follo Line is scheduled for completion in 2021. It will allow regional trains to bypass the Østfold Line between Oslo and Ski, freeing up capacity. This will allow the L2 service to increase to four hourly services from the early 2020s, although L21 will no longer call at Holmlia.

== Bibliography ==
- Bjerke, Thor; Holom, Finn (2004). Banedata 2004 (in Norwegian). Hamar / Oslo: Norwegian Railway Museum / Norwegian Railway Club. ISBN 82-90286-28-7.
- Grue, Berit; Hoelsæter, Arnfinn (2000). Innfartsparkering med bil og sykkel. TØI notat (in Norwegian). Vol. 1159/2000. Institute of Transport Economics. ISSN 0806-9999.
- Langård, Geir-Widar; Ruud, Leif-Harald (2005). Sydbaneracer og Skandiapil – Glimt fra Østfoldbanen gjennom 125 år (in Norwegian). Oslo: Norwegian Railway Club. ISBN 978-82-90286-29-8.
- Nygaard, Arnfinn (1990). Om Holmlias historie – Fra bygdeborg til drabantby (in Norwegian). Miljøsenteret.

Preceding station			Following station
Hauketo	Østfold Line		Rosenholm
Preceding station	Local trains		Following station
Hauketo	L2	Stabekk–Oslo S–Ski	Rosenholm
Hauketo	L2	Oslo S–Kolbotn	Kolbotn
