= Den Lille Nøttefabrikken =

Norwegian nut and dried fruit company

- Industry: nuts and dried fruit
- Founded: 1999; 27 years ago
- Headquarters: Hauketo, Oslo, Norway (-2006); Fredrikstad, Norway (2006-)
- Owner: Brynild Gruppen
- Website: www.nottefabrikken.no

Den Lille Nøttefabrikken is a Norwegian nut and dried fruit company.

It was established in the late 1990s by Bjørn Holmsen with its production facility at Hauketo. Holmsen had formerly founded, and sold, the company Nøttolf. Den Lille Nøttefabrikken packs nuts and dried fruit which are sold in small bags or in bulk. It grew with 30% during its first year from 1999 to 2000. It was bought by Brynild Gruppen in 2003, and the production was moved to Fredrikstad in 2006.

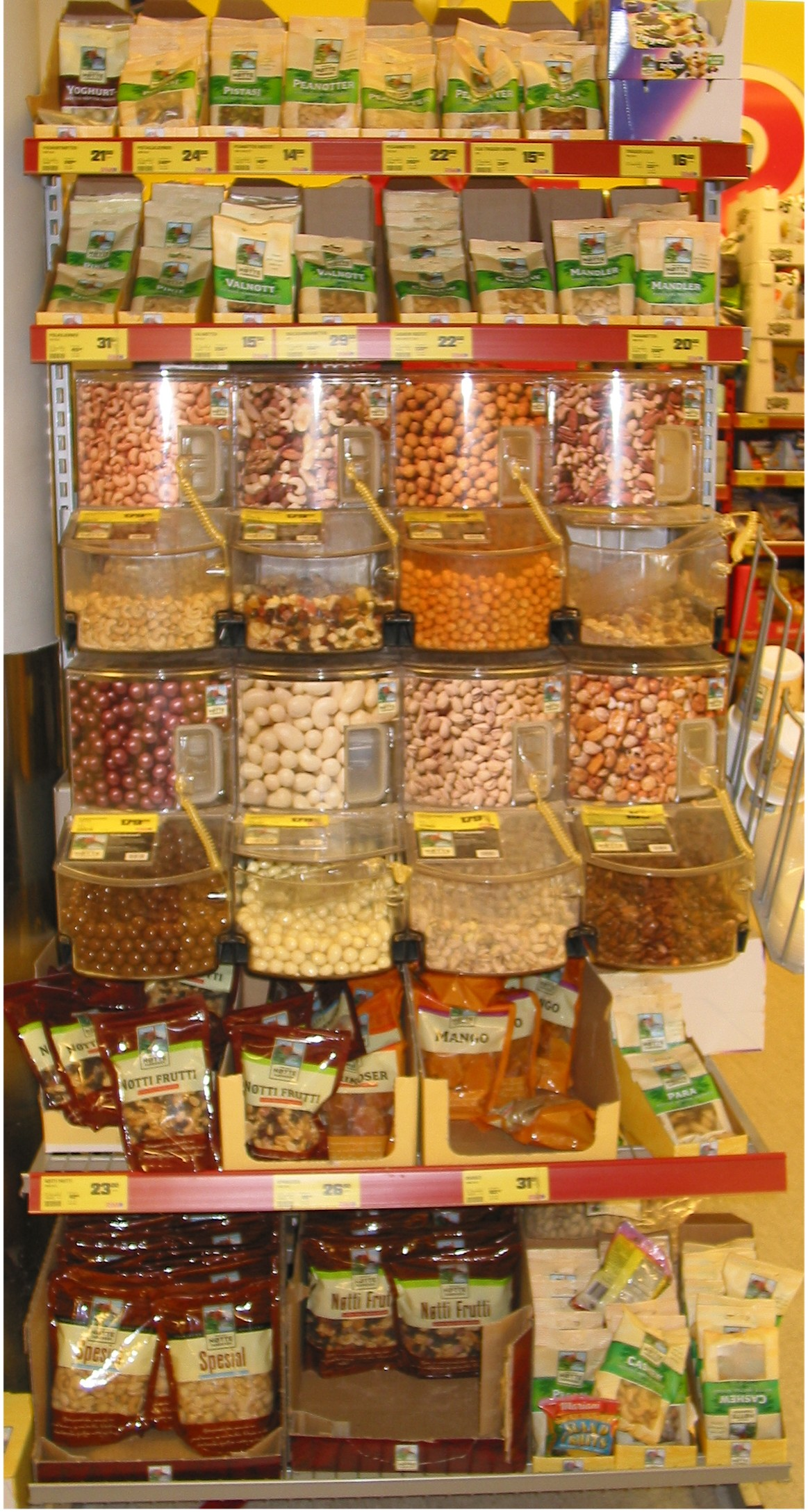
A rack full of Den Lille Nøttefabrikken products.
