= Holmsen =

Holmsen is a Norwegian surname. Notable people with the surname include:

- Andreas Holmsen (1906–1989), Norwegian historian
- Bjørn Holmsen (born 1948), Norwegian entrepreneur
- Borghild Holmsen (1865–1938), Norwegian pianist, music critic and composer
- Eivind Holmsen (1894–1990), Norwegian professional sports shooter
- Hanna Resvoll-Holmsen (1873–1943), Norwegian botanist
- Øivind Holmsen (1912–1996), Norwegian international footballer
- Sverre Holmsen (1906–1992), Swedish author
