= Bjørn Holmsen =

Bjørn Holmsen (born 1948) is a Norwegian entrepreneur in the nut business.

His entrepreneur career started in 1989 with the company Nøttolf. The first factory was situated in an Oslo basement of 6 square metres. The production was split between nuts sent to kiosks and restaurants in bulk, and special nuts sold in small bag packages. The latter division was sold to the Orkla Group in 1995, in order to strengthen the snack brand KiMs. In addition to the sales fee of 10 million kr, Holmsen penned a royalty deal for future sales by the Nøttolf brand, but the sale declined somewhat. He was also denied the option of starting a competitor company within packaged nuts between 1995 and 2000. However, in the late 1990s he started a new company Den Lille Nøttefabrikken. In 1999 the company moved into a 3,000 square metre factory at Bjørnerud near Hauketo. It was soon sued by the Orkla-controlled company Sætre (distributor of KiMs), since Den Lille Nøttefabrikken delivered nuts to Hakon Gruppen which were packaged by Private Label Company en route, displacing Sætre as a vendor.

Den Lille Nøttefabrikken became a success, and the brand was bought by Brynild Gruppen in 2003. This time, Holmsen's quarantine time in the nut business was set to three years. In 2006, the same year as Brynild Gruppen moved the production of Den Lille Nøttefabrikken nuts from Bjørnerud to Fredrikstad, Holmsen moved in at Bjørnerud and launched a new company Nøttekongen. Nøttekongen immediately started competing with Den Lille Nøttefabrikken in the packaged nuts segment. Holmsen directed his efforts towards low prices and "super-rational production". His brand was taken on board mainly by the chains ICA Supermarked, ICA Maxi and REMA 1000.

Holmsen lives in Oslo and has a fortune of about US$7 million.
