= Kolbotn Station =

Railway station in Nordre Follo, Norway

Kolbotn
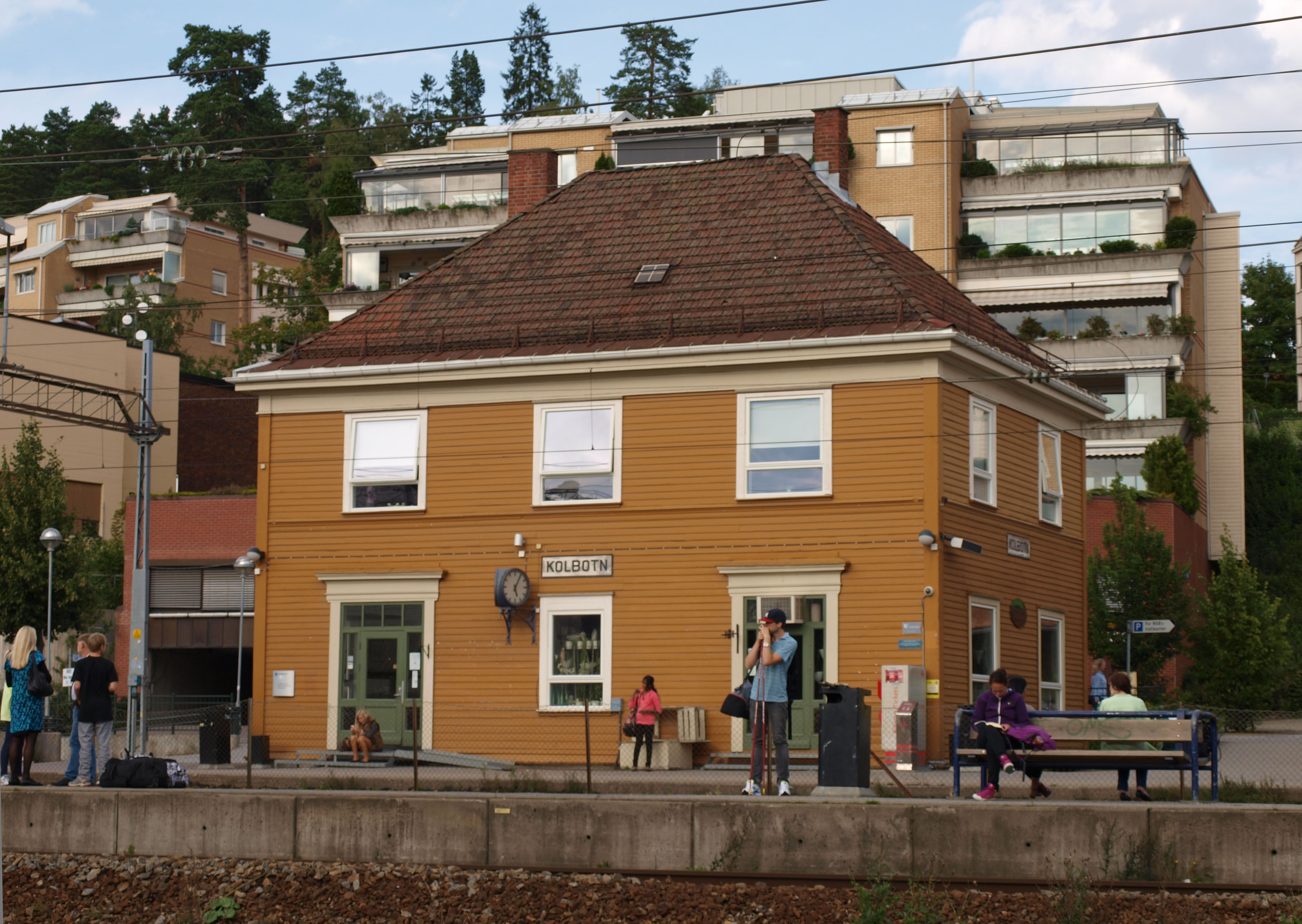

General information
- Location: Kolbotn, Oppegård; Norway
- Coordinates: 59°48′39″N 10°48′03″E
- Elevation: 101.3 m (332 ft)
- Owner: Bane NOR
- Operator: Vy
- Line: Østfold Line
- Distance: 12.86 km
- Connections: Bus:81X

History
- Opened: 1895
Location

Kolbotn is a railway station located at Kolbotn in Oppegård, Norway. Located 12 km from Oslo S on the Østfold Line, it is served by commuter trains operated by Vy.

As part of the new high-speed the Follo Line between Oslo and Ski, was previously considered as an intermediate station.

Preceding station			Following station
Rosenholm	Østfold Line		Solbråtan
Preceding station	Local trains		Following station
Rosenholm	L2	Stabekk–Oslo S–Ski	Solbråtan
Holmlia	L2	Oslo S–Kolbotn	–
