= Brynild Gruppen =

Norwegian confectionery company

Brynild Gruppen AS is one of the larger Norwegian family-owned and operated confectionery companies. Its products include chocolate, confections, hard candy, sweets, nuts and dried fruits.

== History ==
The company's history dates from 1895 and is based in Fredrikstad. It now markets a number of brands including Dent (mints and gum), Minde Sjokolade (chocolates), Michael's Farm (nuts), Brynild (confections), and Den Lille Nøttefabrikken (snacks and nuts).
