= Hauketo =

Neighborhood in Oslo, Norway

Coordinates: 59°50′49.016″N 10°48′15.412″E

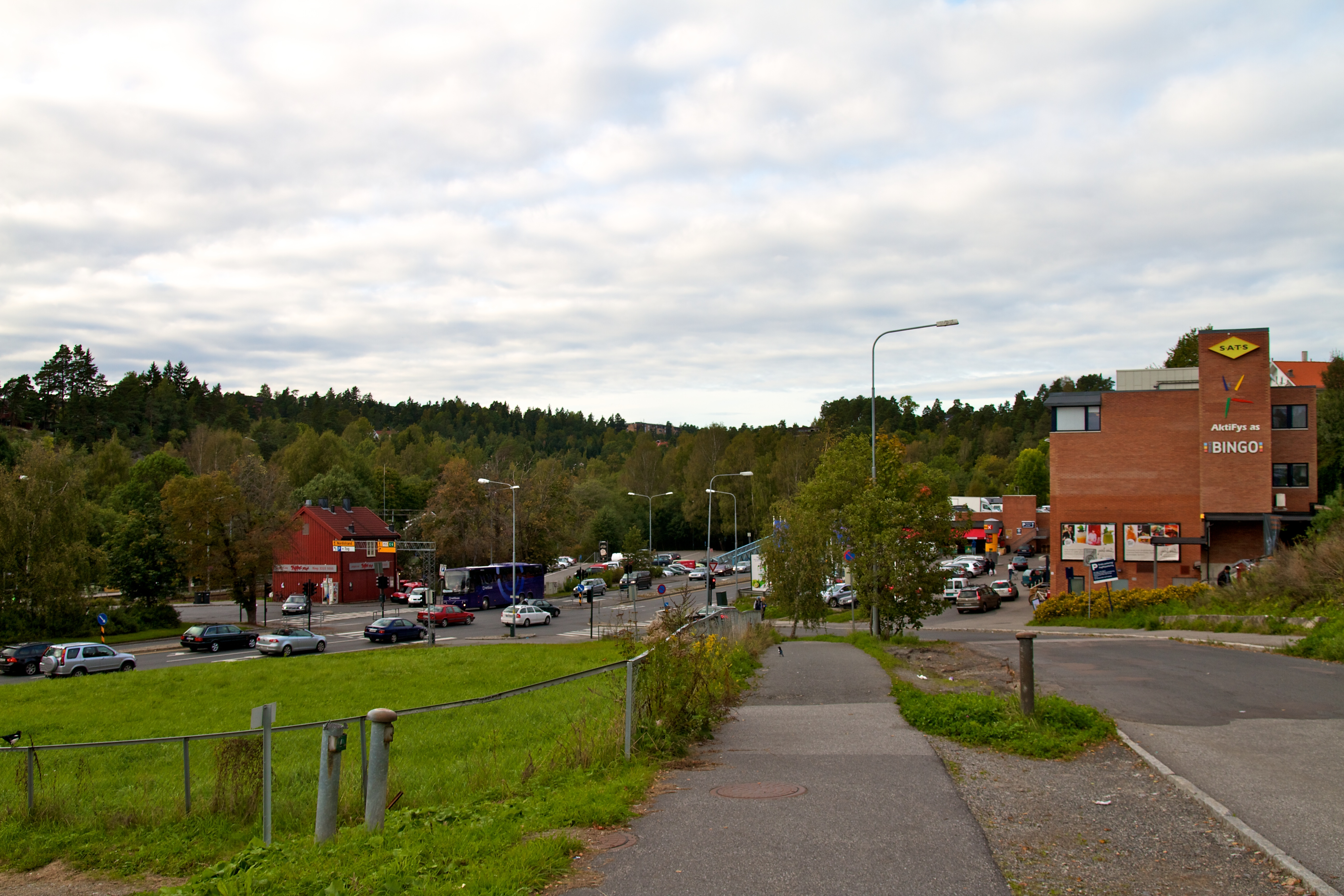
Hauketo - 2011-09-10 at 17-23-34

Hauketo is a neighborhood in the borough of Søndre Nordstrand in Oslo, Norway.

It is mainly a residential area with detached housing as well as larger blocks. It is served by the Østfold Line station Hauketo. It is located south of Ljabru, east of Sloreåsen, west of Mortensrud and north of Holmlia and Prinsdal.
