= Holmlia =

Neighborhood in Oslo, Norway

- Neighborhood
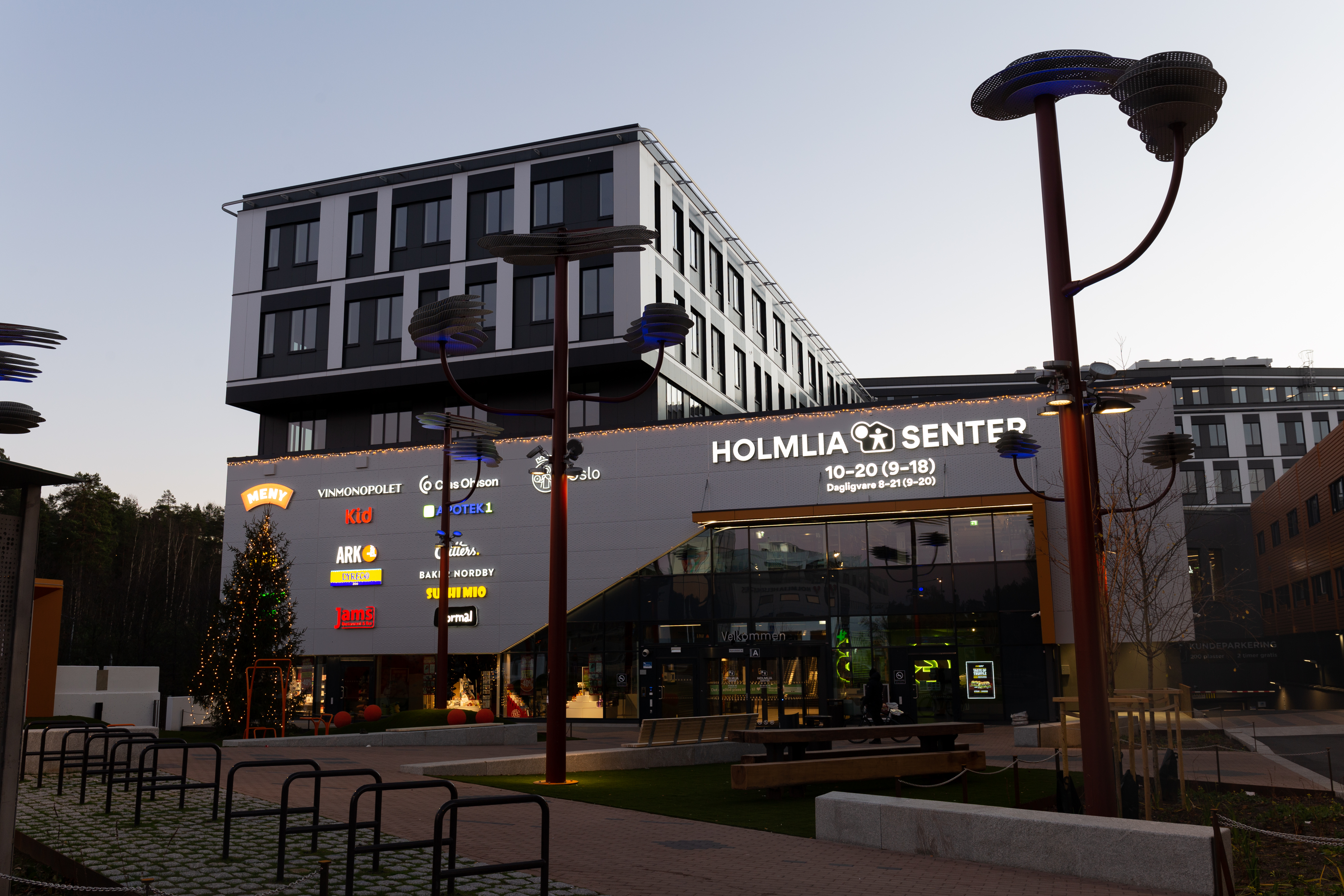
- Holmlia center, located on Holmlia senter vei.

- Location of Holmlia in Norway.
- Coordinates: 59°50′5.55″N 10°47′41.89″E
- Country: Norway
- Region: Eastern Norway
- County: Oslo
- Municipality: Oslo

Population (2012)
  - Total: 35,843
- Time zone: UTC+01:00 (CET)
  - Summer (DST): UTC+02:00 (CEST)
- Post Code: 1255 Oslo

Holmlia is a neighborhood in Oslo, Norway with around 12,000 residents. It is located in the south-western part of Søndre Nordstrand, the southernmost borough in Oslo.

The neighborhood is served by Holmlia Station on the Østfold Line, which has a travel time to Oslo S of about 13 minutes. The Holmlia Sportsklubb is located in Holmlia, which contains a football club currently in the Norwegian fourth division. Holmlia also boasts an extensive hiking trail network, which makes it possible to walk to most of the surrounding neighborhoods without ever crossing a single street. It also contains Oslo's only underground swimming pool, Holmlia Bad, located in the mountains near the middle school. The 25 m (82 ft) long pool is run by the city and offers saunas, a slide, and special bathing hours for children and women.

Holmlia is a highly ethnically diverse part of the city of Oslo, with 47.7% of the population having a minority background. The average age of Holmlia's residents is very low. Children under the age of 19 make up 31.3% of the population, whereas only 3.2% are pensioners.

Media said in 2016 that the employment rate is at 73% in Søndre Nordstrand - nine percent lower than the 82% employment in Norway.

The neighborhood's name comes from the rail stop built in 1932. Holmlia Station was originally going to be called Holm Station, but the name was rejected since there was already a Holm on the Vestfold Line. The station was therefore named Holmlia, a combination of two local property names: the farm Holm and the torp Lia.

== History ==
=== Medieval History ===
The earliest records show that Holmlia was once part of a larger area known as "Rudin" (Old Norse for "clearings," compare to modern verb "å rydde" which means "to clear"). Rudin was a large area that extended over the entire plateau of modern-day Ekeberg and Nordstrand to the north, Bogerud, Skullerud, and Klemetsrud to the east, and Oppegård to the south with Oslofjord as its western border. At first Rudin was a relatively barren area midway between the richer agricultural areas of the Grorud Valley to the north and the Follo villages to the south. However by the 14th century there were an estimated 50 farms in Rudin, including two recorded farms in Holmlia itself: Ås, which still exists in a smaller form today, and Holm, the namesake of the modern community which was roughly where the intersection of Rosenholmveien and Holmliaveien lies today.

The first recorded resident of Holmlia was Bjørn Bonde, who lived on Ås farm around 1320. Rudin was devastated by the Black Death in the mid-14th century, and most of the farms were deserted and fell into disrepair. It wasn't until the 16th and 17th century that wealthy landowners, usually urbanites from Oslo, began to restore and revitalize the community. Henrich Krummedike bought the deserted Ås manor in the 16th century and became the first recorded landowner in Holmlia.

=== World War II ===
Holmlia became an important location during the Second World War due to its close proximity to occupied Oslo. The area was seen by the Germans as a good forward post to detect if there were to be air raids on Oslo. There are records of two spotlights set up in the area to detect enemy aircraft: one near the horse enclosure of Holm farm, and the other on a rocky outcropping between Ås farm and Rosenholm. The Germans for the most part left Holmlia's residents alone, though one resident recalled Germans following him with the spotlight during a late return home one night. The Germans' assumption about the suburb being a vital location proved correct, as British bombers did fly low over Holmlia on their way up the fjord during the Oslo Mosquito raid in 1942.

In 1944, the German Organisation Todt built a small labor camp on Ljanskollen hill in west Holmlia. The camp held about 250 people, most of them Norwegian political prisoners, and an estimated 5,000 to 6,000 men passed through the camp in all. The prisoners were treated relatively well compared to those in other Nazi camps, and the German guards even allowed Anlaug Thidemansen, then owner of Holm farm, to bring in a constant supply of canned soup for the prisoners. The prisoners were put to work building a tank to hold oil and gas. The plan was to have the gas/oil brought from the docks and then pumped into a nearby processing plant, where the finished product would be loaded directly onto trains. However, the processing facility wasn't completed before the occupation ended, so the tank was never in use.

After the war, the camp was used by Norway as a temporary internment camp for women suspected of having sexual relations with Nazi soldiers (also called tyskertøs). When the larger National Internment Camp for Women in Hovedøya opened, the camp was used as a "screening area" for women to be later sent off to Hovedøya. The building was active as a screening area until 1946 when politician Sven Oftedal put an end to the practice.

=== Contemporary ===
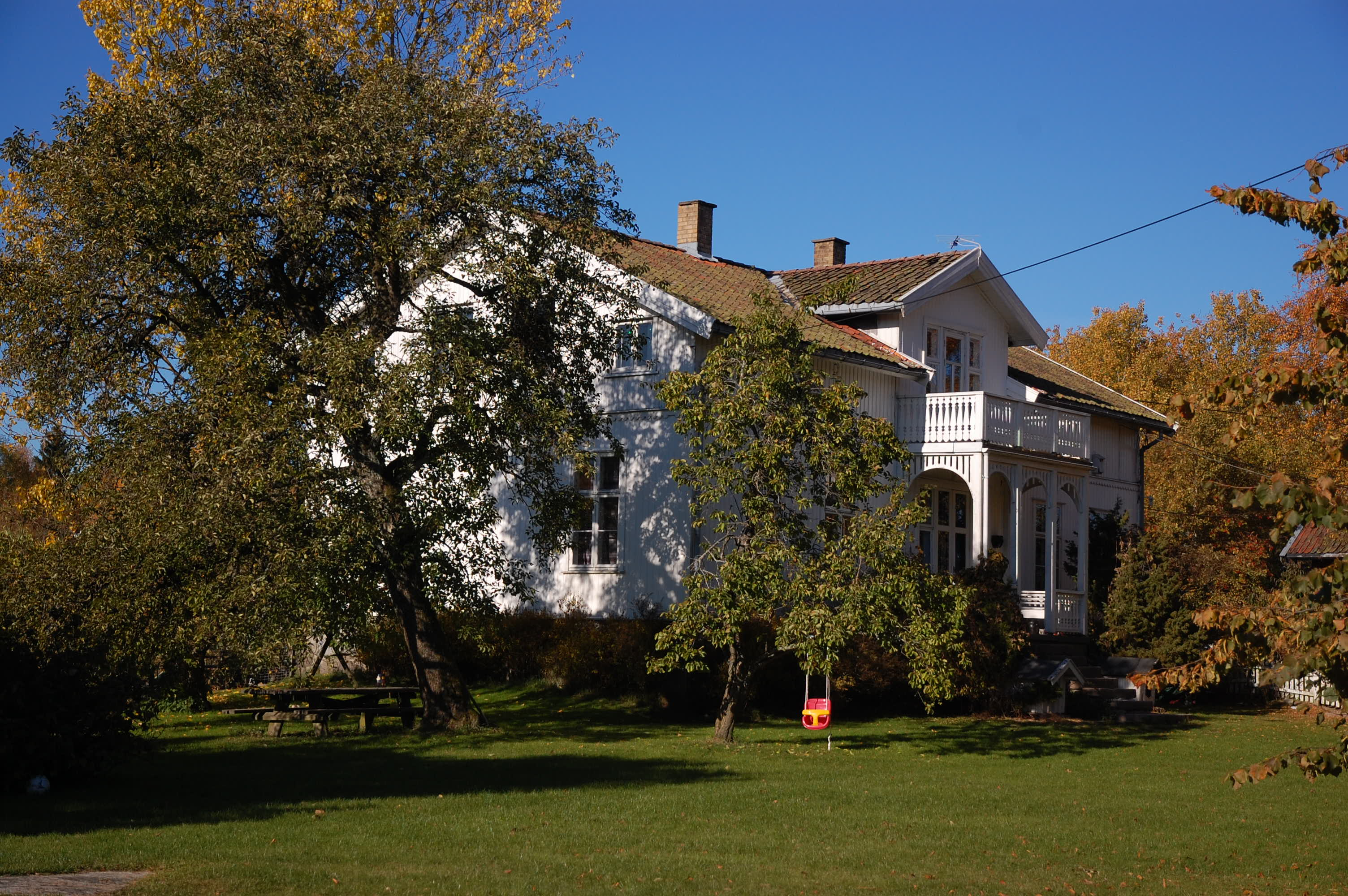
The main farmhouse on Ås farm. See the Wikipedia Commons link below for more pictures of the farm.

In recent times Holmlia is more known for being a dense and diverse residential suburb of Oslo. Suburban development began in the late 1970s, and today the area is characterized by a mix of terraced houses and high-rise apartment buildings. The neighborhood now contains about 4,500 apartments, most of which built in the 1980s, making it one of Oslo's largest and newest suburbs.

Since Holmlia became a populous residential suburb of Oslo, little of the area's agricultural history remains. However, the main buildings and animal pens at the Ås farm were preserved by the city of Oslo, and the Southern Ås Farm (Søndre Ås Gård og Miljøsenter) is now an environmental center that gives city-dwellers a taste of farm life.

On 26 January 2001, the racially motivated murder of Benjamin Hermansen in Holmlia sparked protest marches across Norway and in especially Oslo, against racism and right-wing extremism.
