= Peppes Pizza =

Norwegian pizza chain

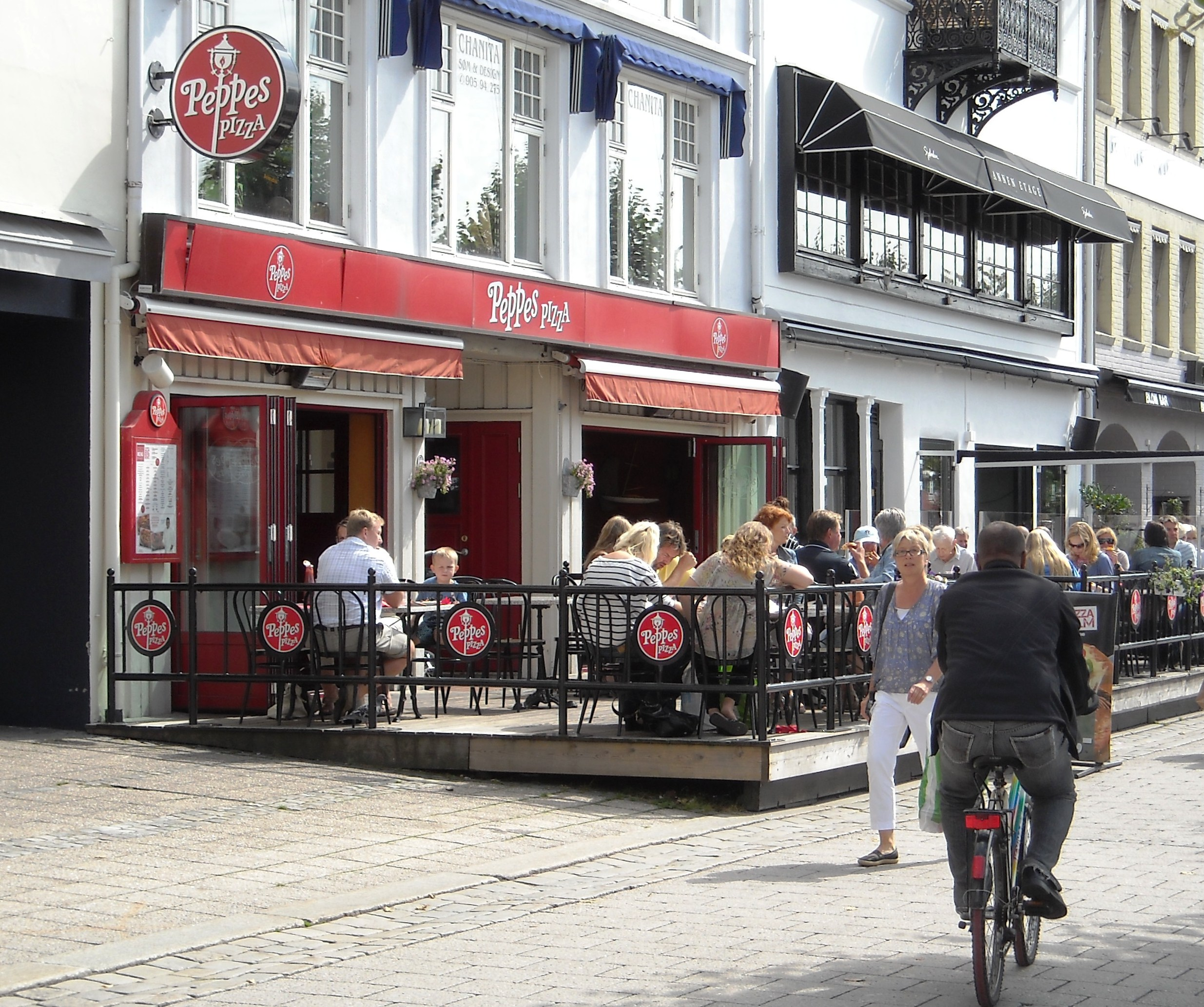
- Peppes Pizza in Arendal
- Type: Subsidiary
- Industry: Restaurant
- Founded: 1970; 56 years ago in Solli plass, Oslo, Norway
- Founders: Louis and Anne Jordan
- Headquarters: Oslo, Norway
- Number of locations: 88 (2022)
- Areas served: Norway
- Products: Pizza, burgers, lasagne
- Number of employees: 999 (2026)
- Parent: Dely AS
- Website: peppes.no

Peppes Pizza is a Norwegian pizza chain that serves American style pizza. Peppes Pizza is the largest pizza restaurant chain in Scandinavia with close to 90 locations.

The restaurant chain was founded in 1970 by Louis Jordan, from Hartford, Connecticut, and his Norwegian wife Anne.

The restaurant chain is currently owned by Dely AS, who also holds the rights in Norway to other cafe/restaurants such as TGI Fridays, Starbucks, La Baguette and Cafe Opus.

Peppes Pizza was the first restaurant that brought pizza to Norway.

Peppes Pizza is currently present in more than 85 locations all over Norway, and more than 9 million pizzas are served by Peppes Pizza each year. Peppes Pizza also delivers pizza all over in Norway. Their menu was first put online in March 1995 as the first foodcompany to do online ordering. The servings have been described as enough for two people and that the pizza chain is "a cut above the rest".

The bestselling fiction book The Seducer by Norwegian author Jan Kjærstad documents an actual history of the pizza chain.

== History ==
Peppes Pizza is associated with the Norwegian-American married couple Louis Jordan (born 1931) and Anne Jordan (born 1944). He was an insurance agent, but had a desire to find a new livelihood when his family moved to Norway. Anne Jordan suggested pizza because she thought the ingredients would suit the Norwegian taste.

Louis Jordan took a job at the pizza restaurant "Pepe Pizzeria" in Hartford, Connecticut. There he used his time well and brought with him important knowledge of American pizza. The knowledge and notes from the pizza restaurant were to form the basis for the pizzas he would later launch in Norway.

With $10,000 and American pizza recipes, after six months in Norway, he started to realize his goal. His wife Anne followed up on the financial and legal obstacles they encountered along the way.

They took over a room at Solli Plass in Oslo where Ben Youcéf had started one of the first international restaurants in Oslo.

"Peppes Pizza Pub", as the restaurant was first called, opened its doors for the first time in May 1970.

=== Development ===
In recent years, Peppes Pizza has expanded beyond Norway and established a presence in other countries, including Sweden, Denmark, and Iceland.

== Foreign locations ==
The pizza chain franchised restaurants in Kuwait and China a few years ago, but these have since closed.

The Chinese restaurants had some different items on the menu that Chinese people are more used to, such as soups and pastas. The first restaurant opened in Beijing, China because of Pizza Hut's success in the country. The restaurant ran a "Pizza & Film" promotion which included a large pizza, a large cola, and an animation DVD.

A restaurant in Sanlitun located in Beijing had a children's play area. Despite being known in Norway as having good food, eChinacities said "Although not renowned for its excellent food Peppes is fairly reasonably priced". National Arabic Company operated six locations in Kuwait.

There was also a restaurant in Leytonstone High Road, London E11 during the 1980s and perhaps the 1990s, owned and run by a brother and sister.
