= Oslo Central Station =

Railway station in Oslo, Norway

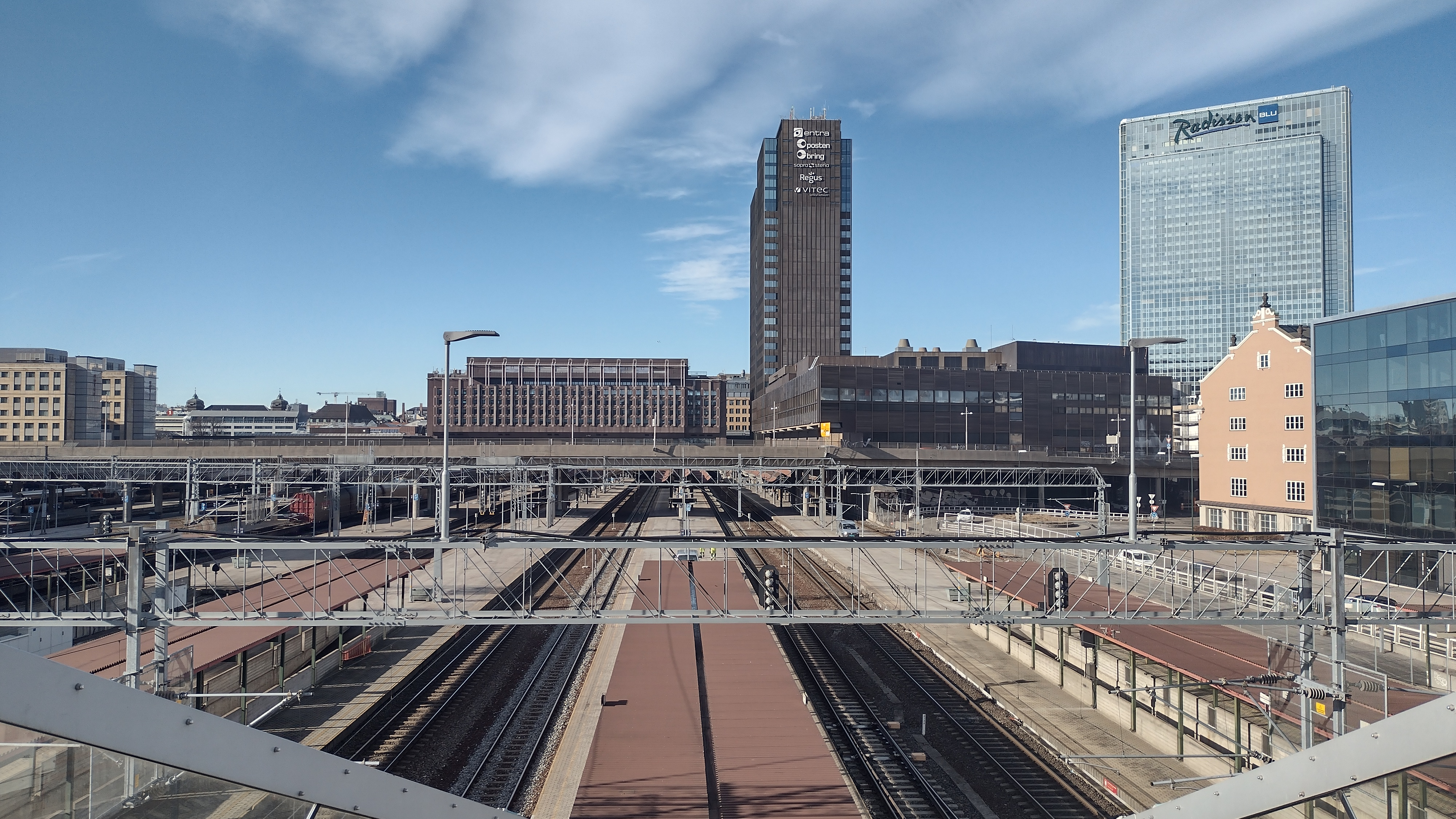

General information
- Location: Jernbanetorget, Gamle Oslo, Oslo; Norway
- Coordinates: 59°54′40″N 10°45′3″E
- Owner: Bane NOR Eiendom
- Operator: Bane NOR; Flytoget; Go-Ahead Norge; SJ; SJ Norge; Vy; Vy Gjøvikbanen; Vy Tåg
- Lines: Drammen Line; Vestfold Line; Gardermoen Line; Gjøvik Line; Trunk Line; Østfold Line; Follo Line
- Platforms: 19
- Connections: Metro: Jernbanetorget; Tram: Jernbanetorget; Dronningens gate Bus: Oslo Bus Terminal; Jernbanetorget

Construction
- Architect: John Engh

Other information
- Station code: OSL
- IATA code: XZO
- Fare zone: Ruter: 1
- Website: oslo-s.no (in Norwegian)

History
- Opened: 1987; 39 years ago
Location
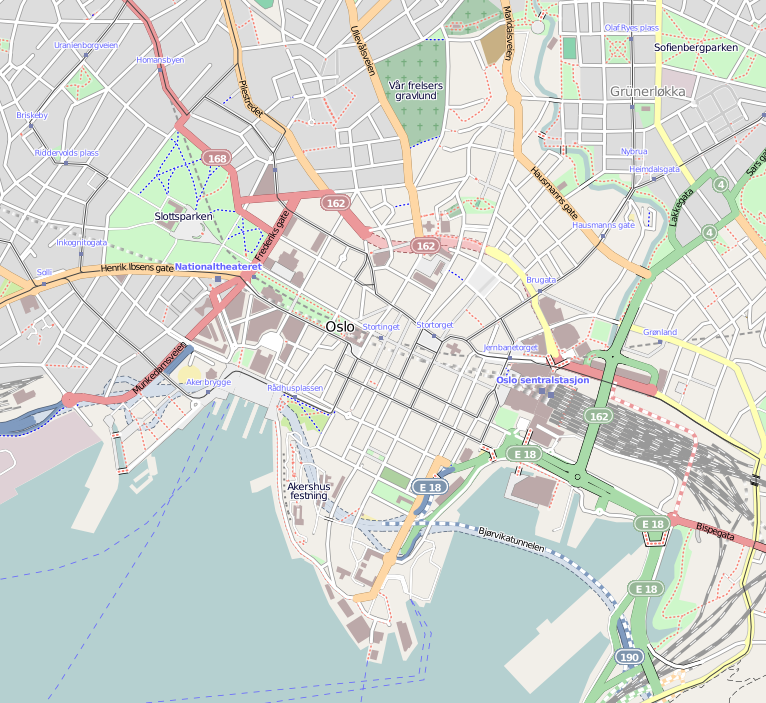
- Location within Central Oslo

Oslo Central Station (Norwegian: Oslo sentralstasjon, abbreviated Oslo S) is the main railway station in Oslo, and the largest railway station within the entire Norwegian railway system. It connects with Jernbanetorget station, which is served by trams and the Oslo Metro. It is the terminus of Drammen Line, Gardermoen Line, Gjøvik Line, Hoved Line, Østfold Line and Follo Line. It serves express, regional and local rail services by four companies. The railway station is operated by Bane NOR while its real estate subsidiary, Bane NOR Eiendom owns the station, and was opened in 1980.

Oslo Central Station was built on the site of the older Oslo East Station (Oslo Østbanestasjon, Oslo Ø), the combining of the former east and west stations being made possible by the opening of the Oslo Tunnel. Oslo Central Station has 19 tracks, 12 of which have connections through the Oslo Tunnel. The station has two buildings, the original Oslo East building and the newer main building for Oslo Central. Each building houses a large shopping centre. The square in front of the station is called Jernbanetorget.

== History ==
=== Two stations ===
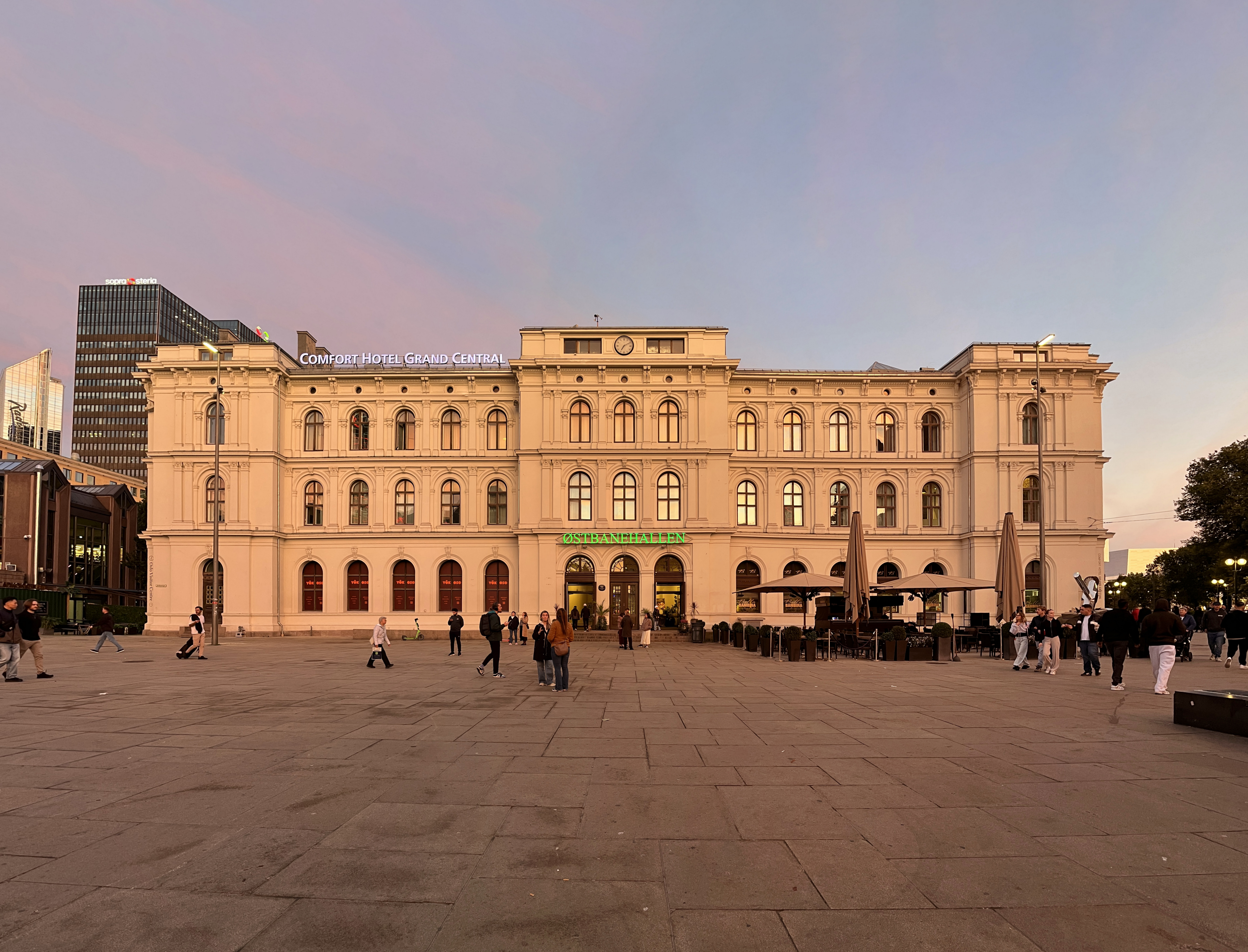
The old Oslo Ø was converted to a shopping mall, but is still part of the station

When the first railway line, Hovedbanen, was built between Oslo and Eidsvoll in 1854, the terminus in Oslo was constructed as an ad-hoc solution located at Gamlebyen. Alternate sites included Youngstorget, Grünerløkka and Vaterland Bridge. In 1852 an architectural competition was held, and a plan based on Crown Street Station in Liverpool won. The station was located east of the river Akerselva, but could not serve as a permanent solution, as it was close to neither the city centre nor the port. In 1859 the freight section of the station was expanded with the purchase of land between Loelva and the port, and part of Bjørvika. From the beginning, rail traffic increased, especially after the expansion of the Trunk Line to Hamar in 1862, and the opening of the Kongsvinger Line in 1865.

In 1872 Oslo got its second terminal station, located at Pipervika near Aker Brygge and the city hall. Oslo West Station (or Oslo V) was built to allow the then narrow-gauged Drammen Line between Drammen and Oslo to terminate in downtown Oslo. The two stations were located about 2 km (1.2 mi) apart and were not connected by rail until 1907 when the Oslo Port Line was built. There had been discussions about building a central station to connect the Drammen Line with the eastern station, but this idea involved building it via Majorstuen and Grefsen. Oslo V always remained a secondary railway station in Oslo, since it mostly served local traffic to Buskerud, Telemark and Vestfold in addition to the Sørland Line.

=== A new East Line Station ===
The year after the western station opened, in 1873, the Norwegian legislature, the Storting, decided to build a new railway from Kornsjø at the Swedish border through Østfold to Oslo, the Smaalenene Line (now the Østfold Line). Traffic at the station was expected to explode due to this railway and it was decided that a new station had to be built. The engineers within NSB (now Vy) wanted to locate this new station west of the river Akerselva, between Jernbanetorget and Bjørvika. But a conflict arose between Carl Abraham Pihl, who was director of NSB at the time, and the City of Oslo. While Pihl wanted a separate station for the Smaalenene Line, the city wanted to concentrate the stations in one place in Oslo. The engineers insisted on moving the station closer to the city. The architect Georg Andreas Bull drafted four plans for a new station with nine tracks over the river Akerselva. In 1878 the legislature decided to build the smallest suggested station—with only seven tracks over the river, claiming that the station was oversized. Oslo East Station (Oslo Østbanestasjon, Oslo Ø) opened in 1882.

=== Committee after committee ===
But it was soon recognized that the station was too small. The population of Oslo doubled to 150,000 between 1875 and 1890 and from the opening of the station to 1890, the traffic increased from 400,000 passengers annually to more than a million. The most critical part was the freight section, where the trains had to partially use the main railway for switching. One of the proposed solutions was to build the line from Østfold on a viaduct into the station and elevate it on a level above the other tracks. Another problem arose in 1893, when it had to be decided where the new Gjøvik Line was to terminate. Some suggested a station at Grefsen with one line to Oslo East and one via Majorstuen to Oslo West. The Storting decided in 1895 that the Gjøvik Line was to be built to Oslo East.

To start the expansion of the station, the Storting announced a competition in 1896, which was won by Sam Eyde. His plan was to move the freight section away from the passenger sections to Lodalen. The plan was put to the Storting in 1899, and with 70 against 39 votes, the new station was delayed because of the high projected costs. A committee was appointed to look at other possible solutions. The committee split in its final decision, but both factions agreed that a new railway had to be built between the two stations, and proposed a line past the city hall in a tunnel under Akershus Fortress. But again the plan was weakened by the Storting and the only construction to take place was new extensions of the Smaalenene Line and Gjøvik Line and some minor changes to the freight section. The new Oslo Port Line that connected the two stations opened in 1907.

Another committee was created in 1938 to work out plans for a central station. This was the first project to propose a tunnel under the entire city that would branch off from the Drammen Line before Oslo West. The committee proposed two plans, one where all traffic was directed to the new central station and one where the suburban traffic went to Oslo West. It also considered construction of a line north of the city via Grefsen to Oslo East, but this was not recommended. The proposed tunnel below the city was to be 1,660 metres (5,450 ft) long. The plan also included a twelve-story building for NSB's administration at the station, which at the time was spread around at 14 different locations in the city. The committee delivered its report on 7 December 1939 to the Norwegian Ministry of Labour.

=== Wartime and change of plans ===
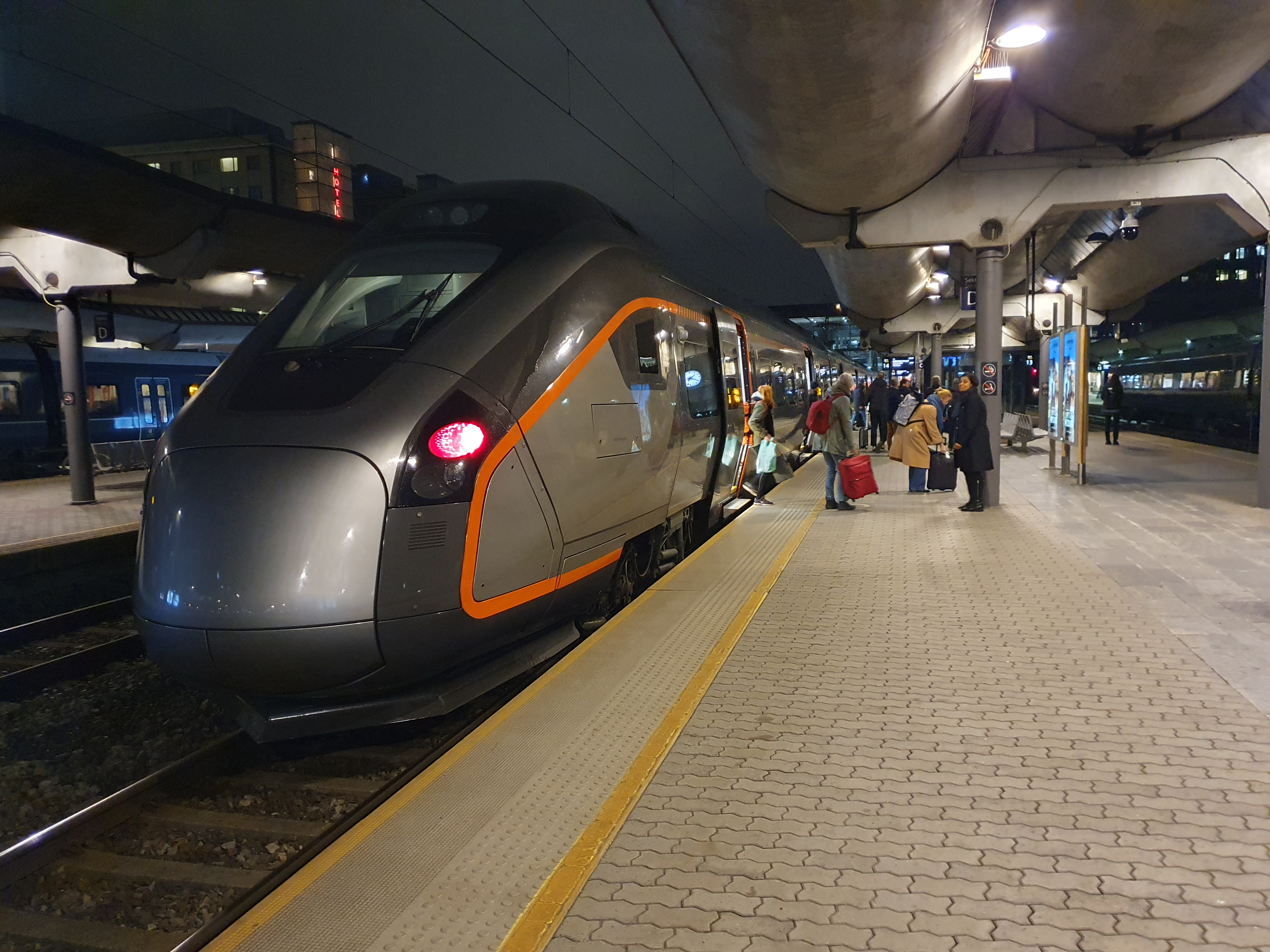
A Flytoget airport express Type 78 at the Oslo Central

In 1940 after the German invasion of Norway in World War II the German puppet government in Norway took over control of transport planning and created the Tøyen Project in 1942. The plan involved dismantling both Oslo V and Oslo Ø and building a new central station at Tøyen. The idea was to convert all suburban transport to diesel buses while trains were to be responsible for long-distance transport. Tram and commuter train services were to be abandoned and the area freed was to be converted to freeways, so it became less important to have the main train stations centrally located in the city. Both the committee and NSB rejected the project. During the war the German forces exploited the railway network and rolling stock, and by the end of the war the entire railway system was worn out.

In 1946 the Planning Office for the Central Station was created, led by Egil Sundt. This committee announced an architecture contest for a new central station, and the Green Light plan by John Engh won. The planning office started construction based on the 1938 committee's work, and expanded the Alnabru Railway Yard in parallel with the new station. The office presented plans which would take 15 years to implement. One of the greatest obstacles was the location of the tunnel under the city. NSB wanted a straight line for quick transport, but complex geological conditions in Oslo, including large areas of clay, prevented this. The plans originally included a station at Oslo City Hall, but a more northerly line was chosen that would be 1,802 metres (5,912 ft) long.

Introduced in 1952, shepherding the plans through the Storting proved difficult. In 1959 the plans were again revised and in 1960 a new committee was created, which suggested building a third line between Grefsen and Bestun for freight trains to connect between the eastern and western lines. It also felt that the tunnel should be expanded westward and terminate somewhere between Skarpsno and Skøyen and at the same time close the Oslo Port Line. The new plans were approved by the Storting in 1962.

=== One station ===
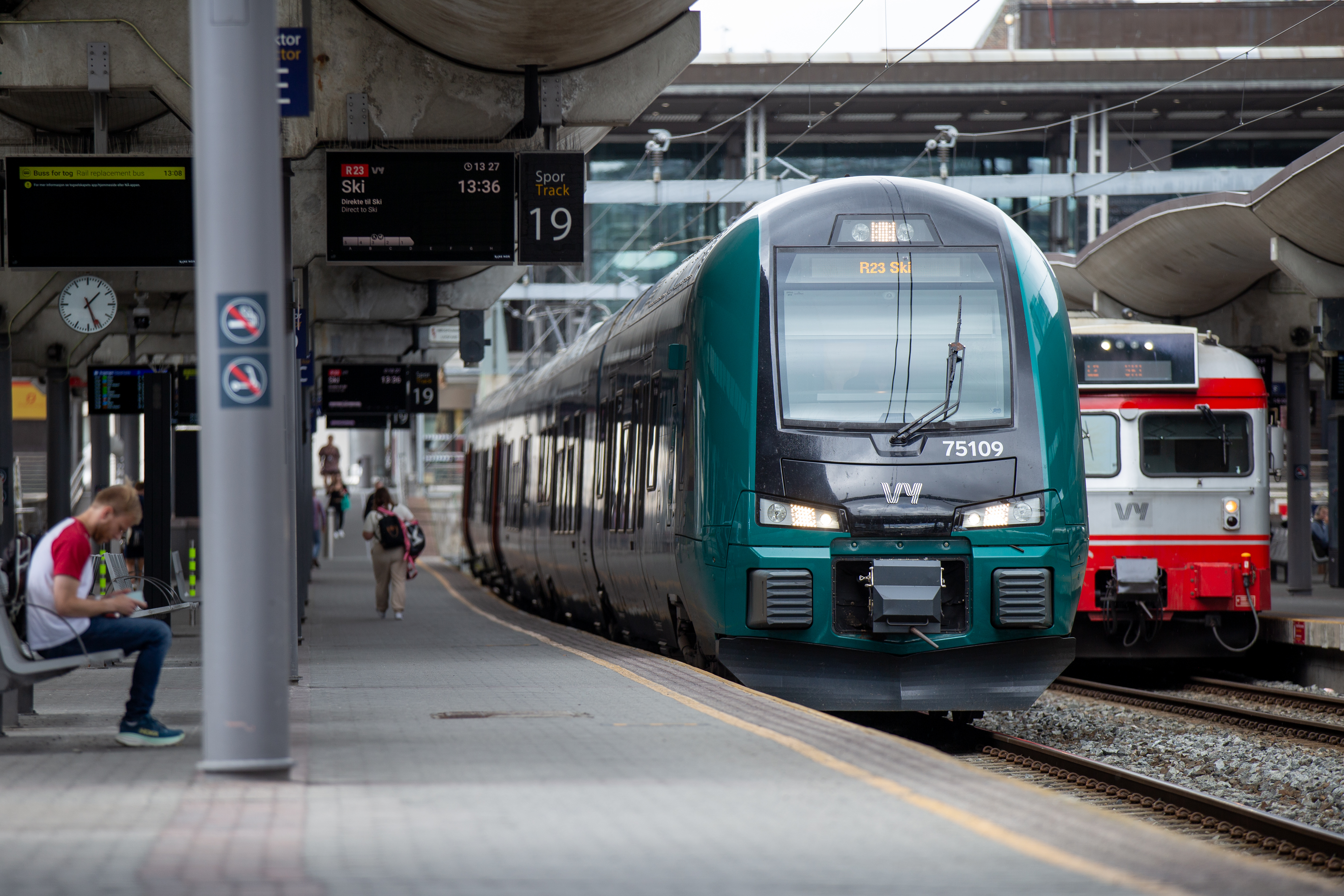
A NSB Type 75 train

The new central station was to have the same basic plans as the suggestion that won the contest in 1946, though slightly modified, among other things keeping the old Oslo Ø building. The station was to have 19 tracks, of which 12 were to connect to the Oslo Tunnel. Construction of the new station started in 1979 and in 1980 the Oslo Tunnel could be taken into use. The tunnel got one of the planned stations, Nationaltheatret, while Elisenberg was never built due to lack of funds. Oslo S was taken into use on Sunday, 1 June 1980 and officially opened by King Olav V on Friday, 30 May 1980. Oslo V was closed in 1989, and is now the seat of the Norwegian Nobel Institute.

In 1982, one person was killed when a bomb exploded at the station.

== Services ==
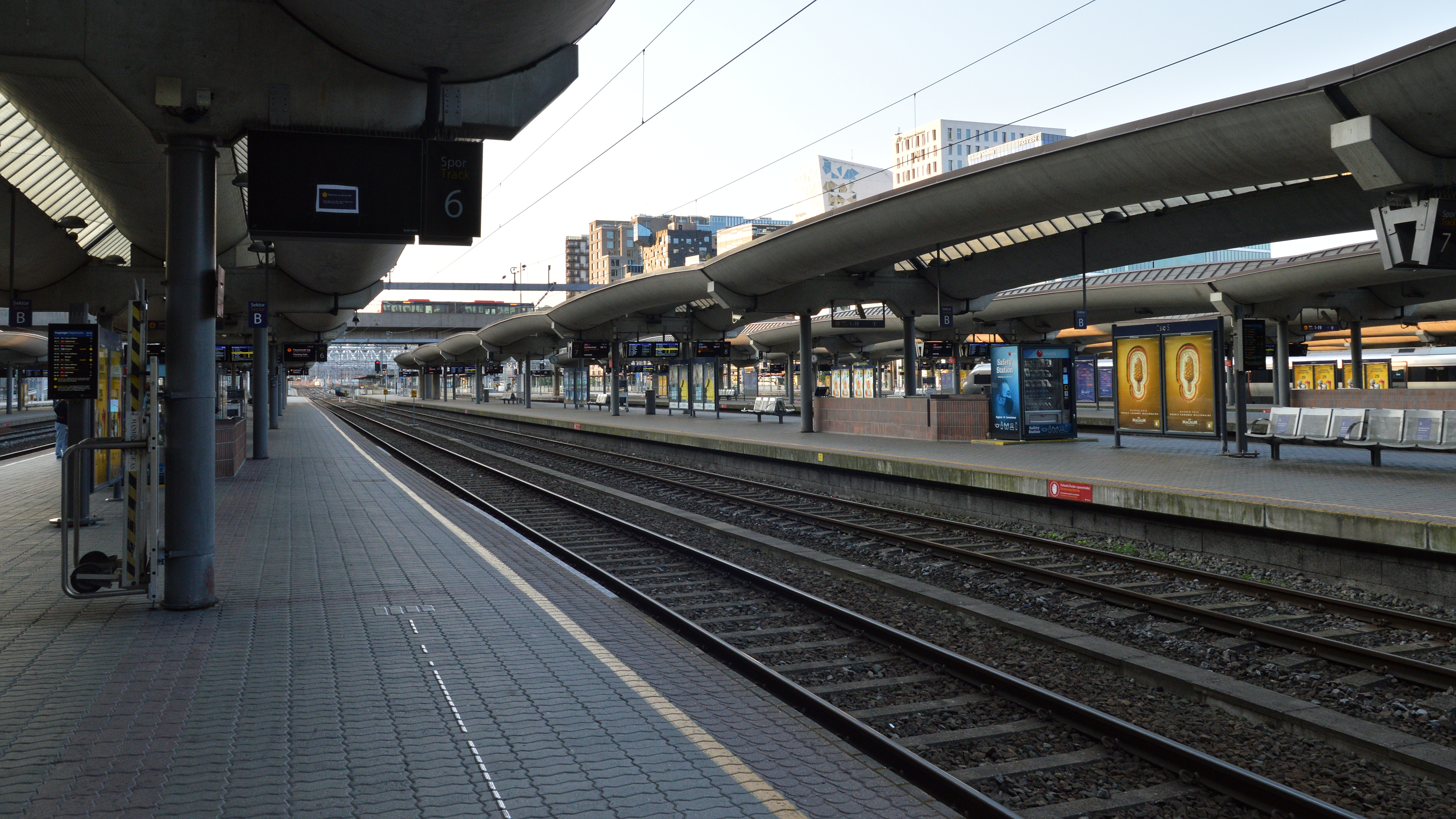
Oslo Central Station in 2021

Four railway companies offer a combination of express, regional and commuter train service in addition to the Flytoget (Airport Express Train) service.

- Express trains are offered to Bergen, Kristiansand, Stavanger and Trondheim in addition to Stockholm in Sweden. Service is provided domestically by Vy using Class 73 units and to Sweden by SJ using loco-hauled Rc6 units as well as X55 "Regina" express trains. Day trains to/from Trondheim run 10 times a day, 8 times a day to/from Stavanger, 4-6 times a day to/from Bergen and trains run nine times a day to/from Stockholm. Night trains are also operated to the first three cities mentioned.
- Regional trains are operated to Skien, Lillehammer, Gjøvik, Halden, Karlstad and Gothenburg. Service is provided by Vy with Class 74 units (Skien – Lillehammer), Class 74 units (Halden – Gothenburg) and by Vy Gjøvikbanen with Class 75 units to Gjøvik. The Swedish PTA Värmlandstrafik operated by Vy Tåg, using X53 "Regina" units on the Oslo – Karlstad service.
- Airport Express Train operates a ten-minute frequency service to Oslo Airport, Gardermoen using Class 71 units. This is the only high speed train service in Norway and is operated by Flytoget.
- Local trains are operated by Vy and Vy Gjøvikbanen using Class 75, Class 69 and Class 72 units.

=== Tracks ===
There are 19 tracks where passengers can board and leave the trains.

The tracks 2–12 have connection to the Oslo Tunnel leading west. All local trains use the tunnel and therefore these tracks. Because of the strict right-hand traffic, in general track 2–7 are used for trains going west, track 7–12 for trains coming from the tunnel going east or south, and tracks 13–19 for trains originating from the station going east or south.

=== Connections ===
Oslo S plus Jernbanetorget is Norway's largest transport hub, served by buses, trams and subway.

- Connection to all five subway lines can be done through Jernbanetorget subway station
- Trams and some city buses stop outside the station at Jernbanetorget
- Long-distance bus termini are located 200 metres away at Oslo Bus Terminal

Preceding station	Express trains		Following station
—	F1	Oslo S–Stockholm C	Lillestrøm/Arvika (express services only)
Sandvika	F4	Bergen–Oslo S	—
Nationaltheatret towards Stavanger		F5	Terminus
Terminus		F6	Lillestrøm towards Trondheim S
Preceding station	Regional trains		Following station
Nationaltheatret	RE10	Drammen–Oslo S–Lillehammer	Lillestrøm
Nationaltheatret	RE11	Skien–Oslo S–Eidsvoll	Lillestrøm
—	RE20	Oslo S–Halden-Gothenburg	Ski
—	RE30	Oslo S–Gjøvik	Grefsen
Preceding station	Flytoget		Following station
Nationaltheatret towards Drammen		FLY1	Lillestrøm towards Oslo Airport, Gardemoen
Nationaltheatret towards Stabekk		FLY2	Oslo Airport, Gardemoen Terminus
Preceding station	Local trains		Following station
Nationaltheatret	L1	Spikkestad–Oslo S–Lillestrøm	Bryn
Nationaltheatret	L2	Stabekk–Oslo S–Ski	Nordstrand
Nationaltheatret	L2	Oslo S–Kolbotn	Hauketo
—	R31	Oslo S–Jaren	Tøyen
Nationaltheatret	R12	Kongsberg–Oslo S–Eidsvoll	Lillestrøm
Nationaltheatret	R13	Drammen–Oslo S–Dal	Lillestrøm
Nationaltheatret	R14	Asker–Oslo S–Kongsvinger	Lillestrøm
Nationaltheatret	R21	Oslo S–Moss	Holmlia
Nationaltheatret	R22	Oslo S–Mysen	Kolbotn
