= Søndre Nordstrand =

Borough of Oslo, Norway

Bydel Søndre Nordstrand
- Borough
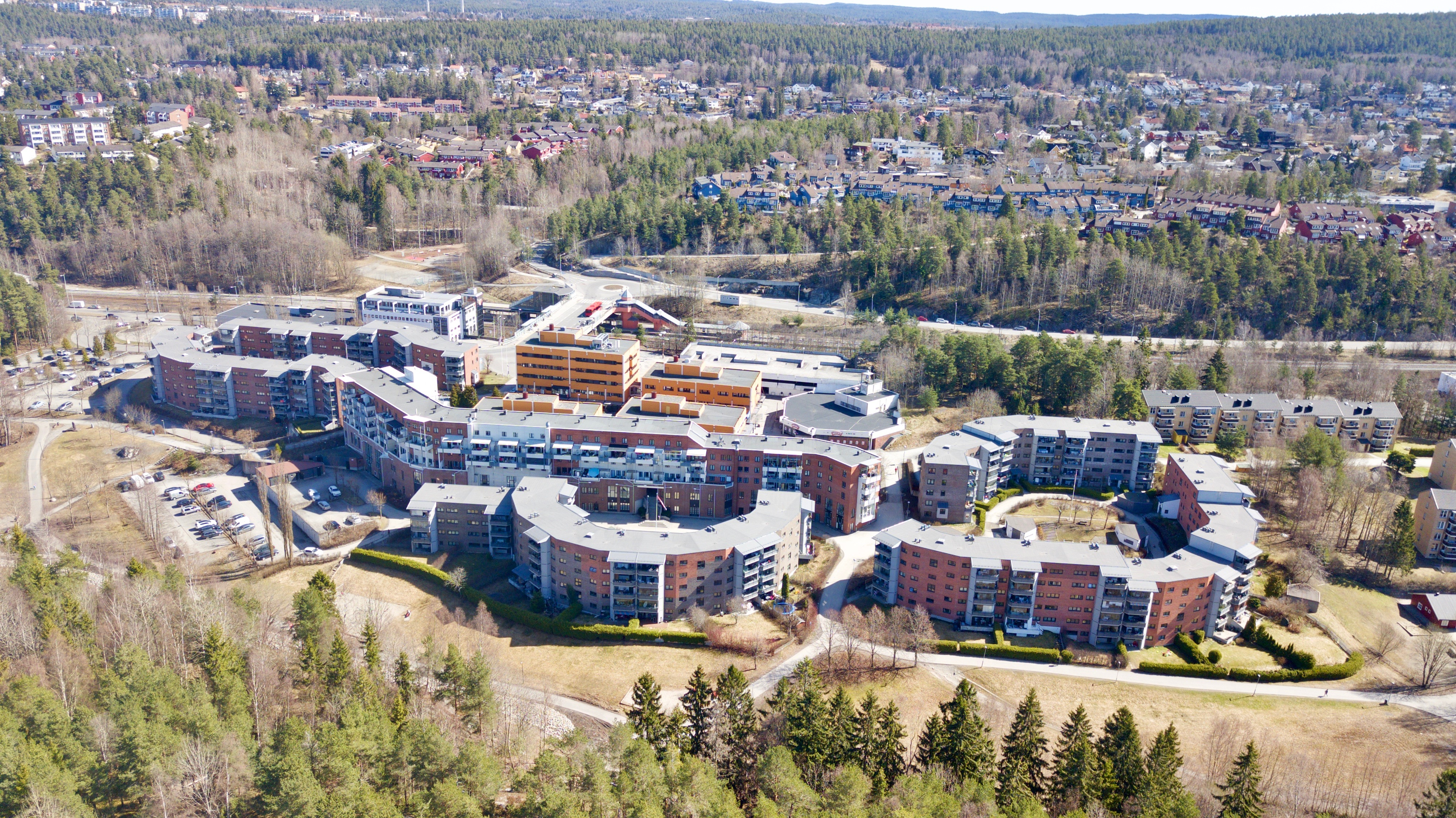

- Coat of arms

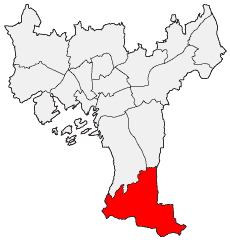
- Coordinates: 59°49′48″N 10°47′36″E
- Country: Norway
- City: Oslo

Area
  - Total: 18.42 km^{2} (7.11 sq mi)

Population (2025)
  - Total: 39,295
  - Rank: 10/15
  - Density: 2,133/km^{2} (5,520/sq mi)
- Time zone: UTC+1 (CET)
  - Summer (DST): UTC+2 (CEST)
- ISO 3166 code: NO-030115
- Website: bsn.oslo.kommune.no

Søndre Nordstrand (Southern Nordstrand) is a borough of the city of Oslo, Norway. It is the southernmost borough of Oslo, bordering Nordstrand. As of 2025 it has 39,295 inhabitants and the highest rate of immigrant population at 56%. It is the only borough of Oslo that has a majority-minority population.

Neighborhoods in Søndre Nordstrand include:

- Holmlia
- Hvervenbukta
- Mortensrud
- Hauketo
- Prinsdal
- Bjørndal
- Klemetsrud
