= Askim Næringspark station =

Former railway station in Askim, Norway

Askim Næringspark

General information
- Location: Askim, Askim; Norway
- Coordinates: 59°34′32.754″N 11°11′42.554″E
- Line: Eastern Østfold Line
- Distance: 31.02 km (19.27 mi)
- Platforms: 1 side platform
- Connections: Bus

History
- Opened: 29 May 1994
- Closed: 9 December 2012
Location
- Location within Østfold Location within Norway

Askim Næringspark Station (Norwegian: Askim Næringspark holdeplass), until 2008 named Næringsparken, was a railway station situated in the eastern outskirts of Askim, Norway. Situated 31.02 kilometers (19.27 mi), it consisted of a single side platform and served an hourly train of the Oslo Commuter Rail. The station opened on 29 May 1994. It was closed on 9 December 2012 due to low usage, with only 44 average daily boarding and disembarking passengers.

== History ==
The area served by Næringsparken originally had two stations, Hoen Station situated 260 meters (850 ft) further east and Sulerud Station, 1.55 kilometers (0.96 mi) east, both established in 1928. The former was closed on 1 February 1947. Sulerud wasclosed on 29 May 1994, the same day as Næringsparken opened. It changed its name from Næringsparken to Askim Næringspark in 2008. The station was served by an hourly service of the Oslo Commuter Rail along the Eastern Østfold Line.

With the platform too short for new NSB Class 72 trains, the Norwegian National Rail Administration was required to lengthen the platform or close the station by 2012. They estimated the costs at 13 million Norwegian kroner. Næringsparken had limited patronage, with only 44 average daily boarding and disembarking passengers in 2008. This compared for instance with 1,400 at Askim Station. The station was therefore closed down, along with Drømtorp, Langli, Langnes on the Eastern Line, on 9 December 2012. In addition to saving the investment costs, cutting four stations allowed faster travel time from the remaining stations. To a certain degree many of the people previously using Askim Næringspark as a park and ride station started using Slitu Station instead.

== Facilities ==
Askim Næringspark Station was situated on the single track Eastern Østfold Line, 31.02 kilometers (19.27 mi) from Oslo S. The station had a simple asphalt side platform which was 61 metres (200 ft) long with a platform height of 70 centimetres (28 in) and a waiting shed.

The station was situated in the eastern outskirts of Askim, 1.9 kilometers (1.2 mi) from Askim Station. The surrounding area was mostly an industrial zone. With a radius of 1 kilometer (0.62 mi) there were 1,600 residents and 900 work places. The industrial site Østfold Næringspark is situated 200 meters (660 ft) from the station. The station had about 44 daily passengers.

== Bibliography ==
- Bjerke, Thor; Holom, Finn (2004). Banedata 2004 (in Norwegian). Hamar / Oslo: Norwegian Railway Museum / Norwegian Railway Club. ISBN 82-90286-28-7.
- Langård, Geir-Widar; Ruud, Leif-Harald (2005). Sydbaneracer og Skandiapil – Glimt fra Østfoldbanen gjennom 125 år (in Norwegian). Oslo: Norwegian Railway Club. ISBN 978-82-90286-29-8.

Preceding station		Following station
Askim	Eastern Østfold Line	Slitu
