= Askim station =

Railway station in Askim, Norway

Askim
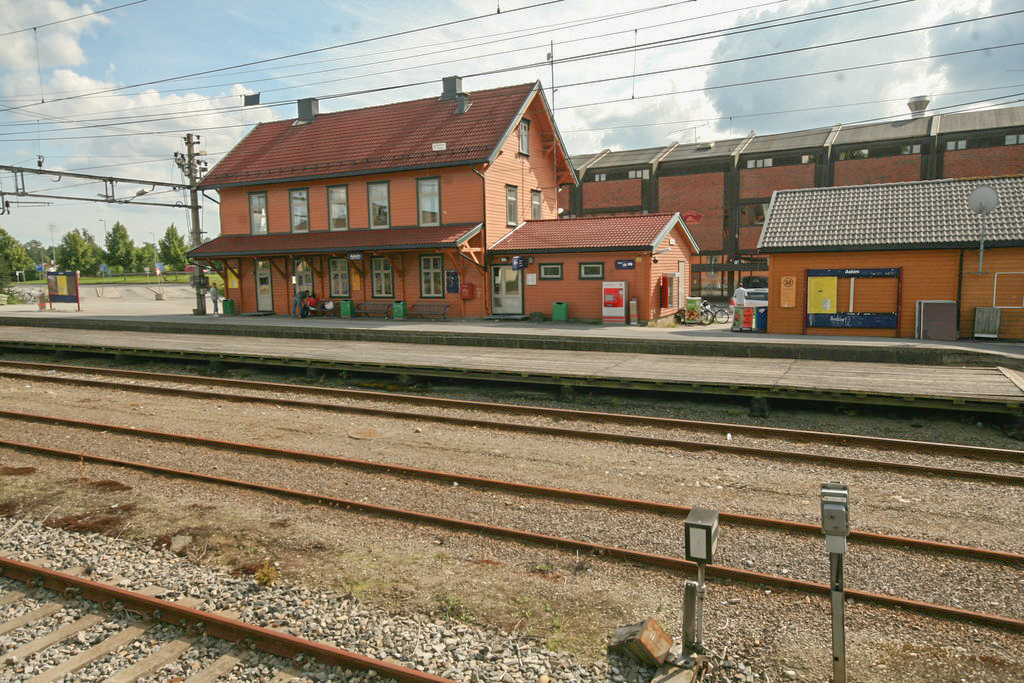

General information
- Location: Askim, Askim; Norway
- Coordinates: 59°34′54″N 11°9′47″E
- Elevation: 130.1 m (427 ft)
- Owner: Bane NOR
- Operator: Vy
- Line: Eastern Østfold Line
- Distance: 53.41 km (33.19 mi)
- Platforms: 2
- Connections: Bus service

Other information
- Station code: ASM

History
- Opened: 1882
Location
- Location within Østfold Location within Norway

Askim Station (Norwegian: Askim stasjon) is located at Askim, Norway on the Eastern Østfold Line. The railway station is served by the Oslo Commuter Rail line L22 from Oslo Central Station. The station was opened with the eastern line of Østfold Line in 1882.

Preceding station			Following station
Spydeberg; Langnes	Eastern Østfold Line		Slitu; Askim Næringspark
Preceding station	Local trains		Following station
Spydeberg	R22	Oslo S–Mysen	Slitu
