= Heia Station =

Railway station in Rakkestad, Norway

Heia
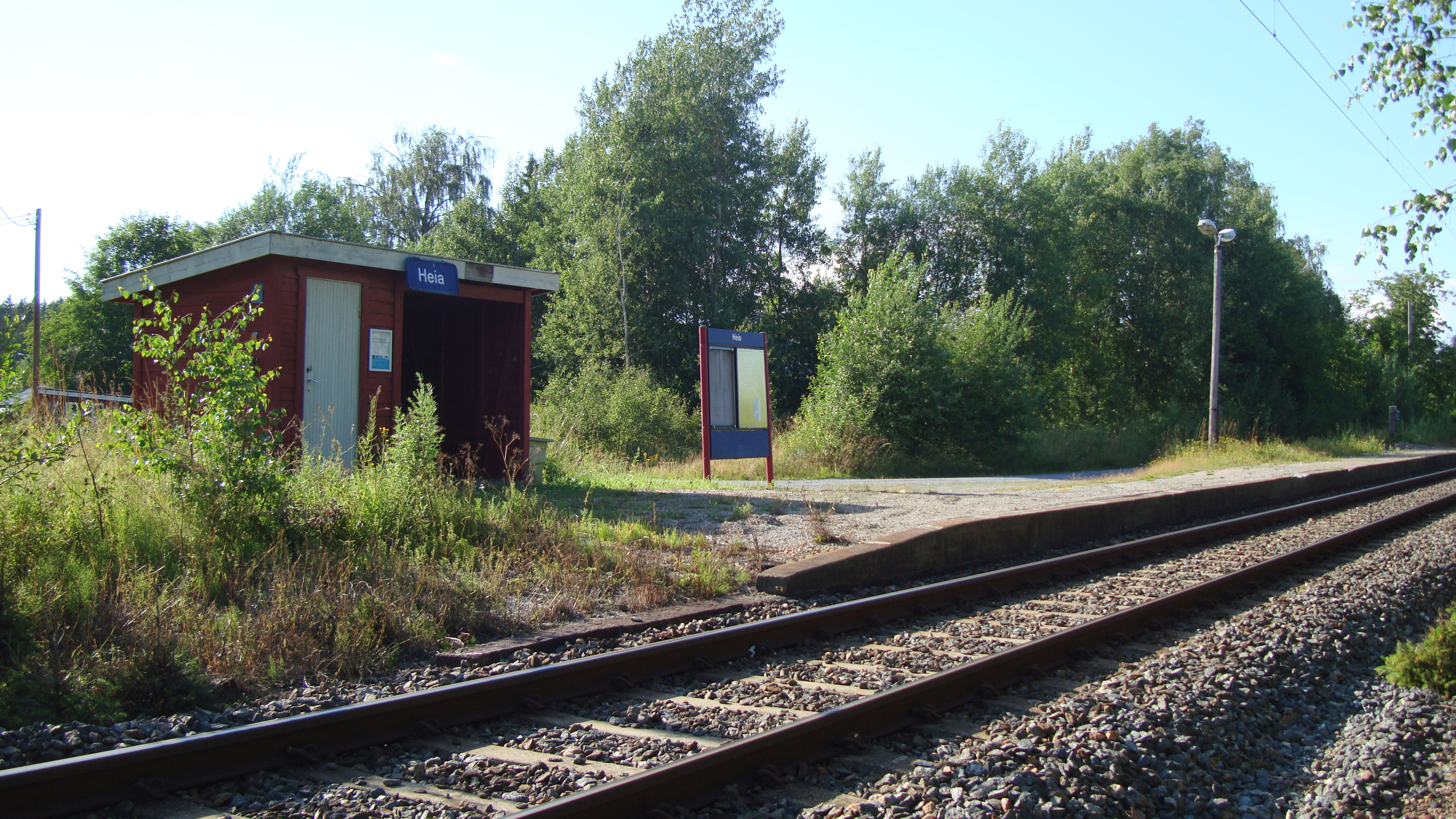

General information
- Location: Heia, Rakkestad; Norway
- Coordinates: 59°28′25.59″N 11°19′46.43″E
- Elevation: 133.2 m (437 ft)
- Owner: Bane NOR
- Operator: Vy
- Line: Eastern Østfold Line
- Distance: 73.45 km
- Platforms: 1
- Connections: Bus service

History
- Opened: 1896
Location

Heia Station (Norwegian: Heia stasjon) is located at Heia in Rakkestad, Norway on the Eastern Østfold Line. The station is served by the Oslo Commuter Rail line R22 from Oslo S during rush hour. Heia Station was opened in 1896.

Preceding station			Following station
Eidsberg	Eastern Østfold Line		Rakkestad
Preceding station	Local trains		Following station
Eidsberg	R22	Oslo S–Mysen	Rakkestad
