= Rakkestad Station =

Railway station in Rakkestad, Norway

Rakkestad
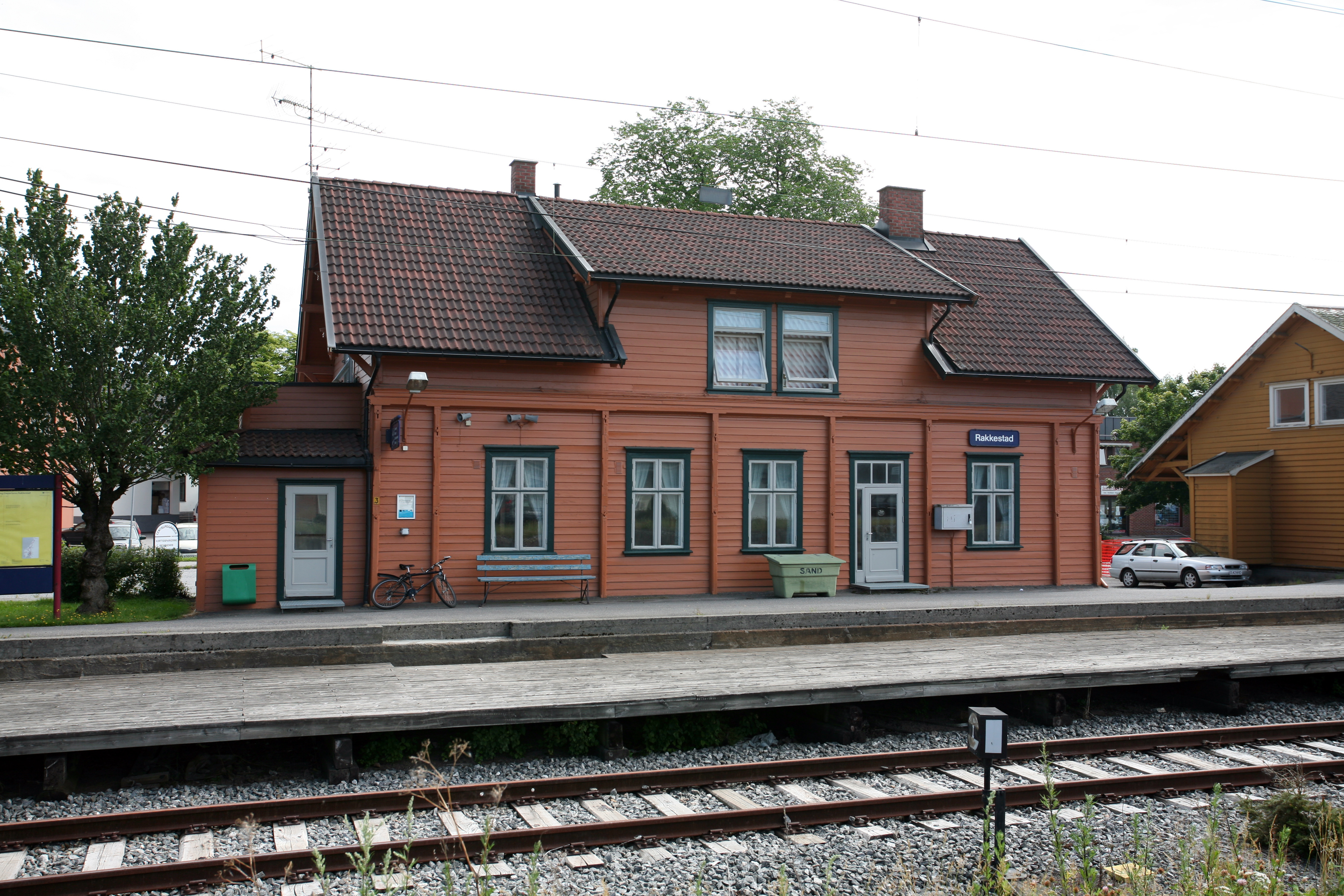

General information
- Location: Rakkestad, Norway
- Coordinates: 59°25′37.46″N 11°20′21.51″E
- Elevation: 103.2 m (339 ft)
- Owner: Bane NOR
- Operator: Vy
- Line: Eastern Østfold Line
- Distance: 78.62 km
- Platforms: 2
- Connections: Bus service

Other information
- Station code: RST

History
- Opened: 1882
Location

Rakkestad Station (Norwegian: Rakkestad stasjon) is located in Rakkestad, Norway on the Eastern Østfold Line. The station is also served by the Oslo Commuter Rail line R22 from Oslo S with two trains during rush hour. Rakkestad Station was opened in 1882 as part of the eastern section of the Østfold line and is the terminal station for the commuter rail services.

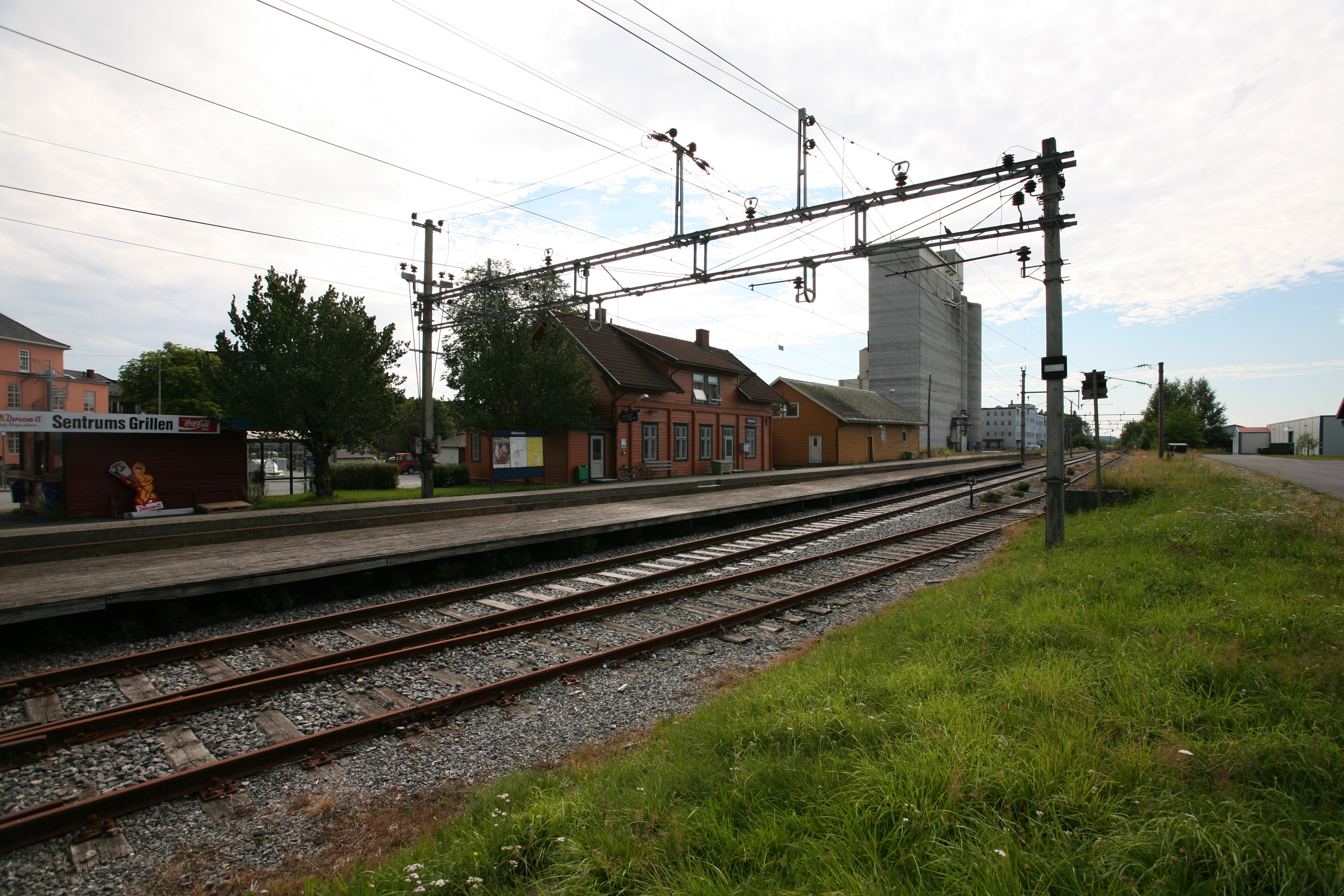

Preceding station			Following station
Heia	Eastern Østfold Line		Sarpsborg
Preceding station	Local trains		Following station
Heia	R22	Oslo S–Mysen	—
