= Spydeberg Station =

Railway station in Spydeberg, Norway

Spydeberg
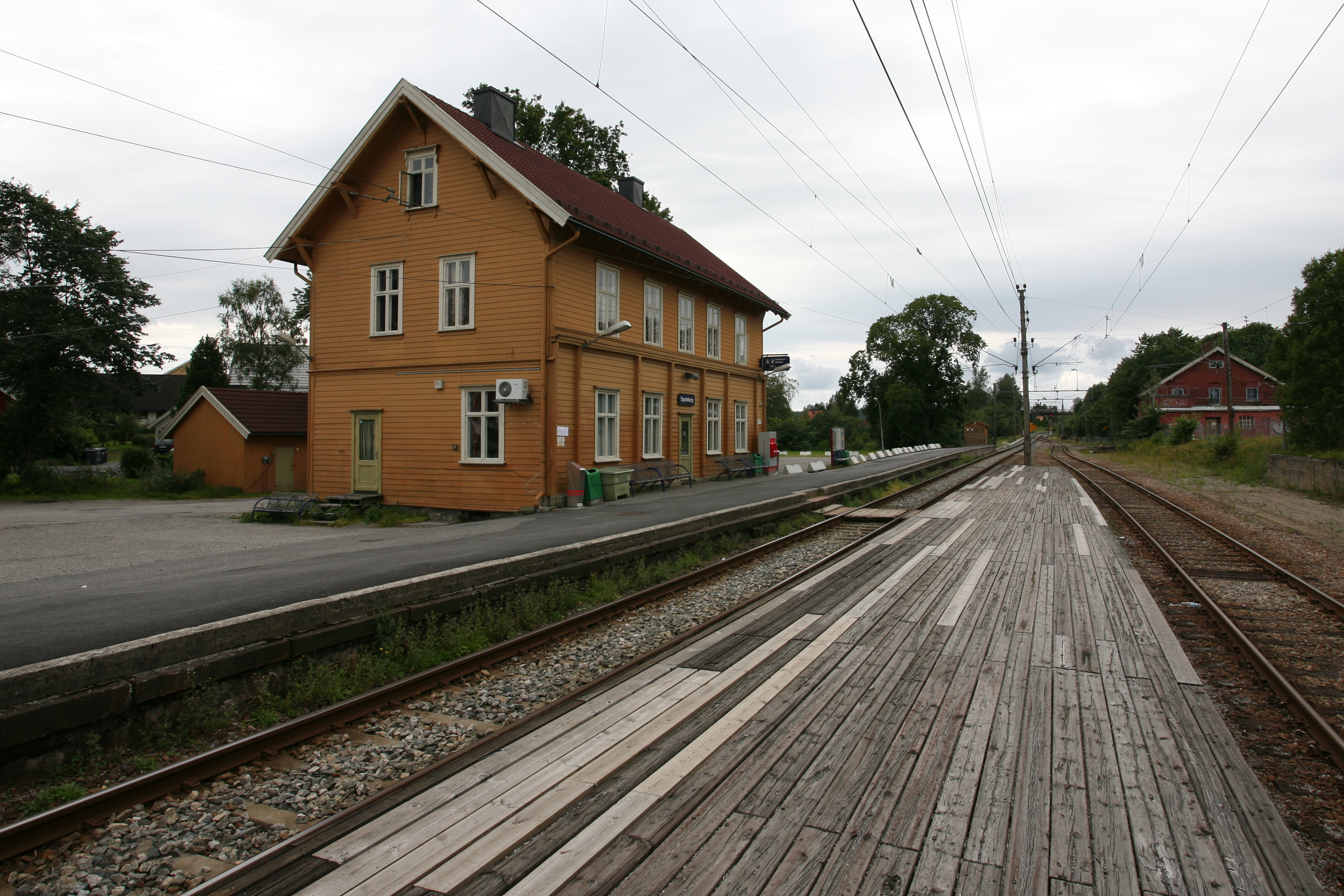

General information
- Location: Spydeberg, Spydeberg; Norway
- Coordinates: 59°37′15″N 11°4′45″E
- Elevation: 107.3 m (352 ft)
- Owner: Bane NOR
- Operator: Vy
- Line: Eastern Østfold Line
- Distance: 44.63 km
- Platforms: 2

Other information
- Station code: SPG

History
- Opened: 1882
Location

Spydeberg Station (Norwegian: Spydeberg stasjon) is located in Spydeberg, Norway on the Østfold Line. The railway station is served by the Oslo Commuter Rail line R22 from Oslo Central Station. The station was opened in 1882.

| Preceding station | | | Following station |
|---|---|---|---|
| Knapstad | Eastern Østfold Line | | Askim; Langnes |
| Preceding station | Local trains | | Following station |
| Knapstad | R22 | Oslo S–Mysen | Askim |
