= Slitu Station =

Railway station in Eidsberg, Norway

Slitu
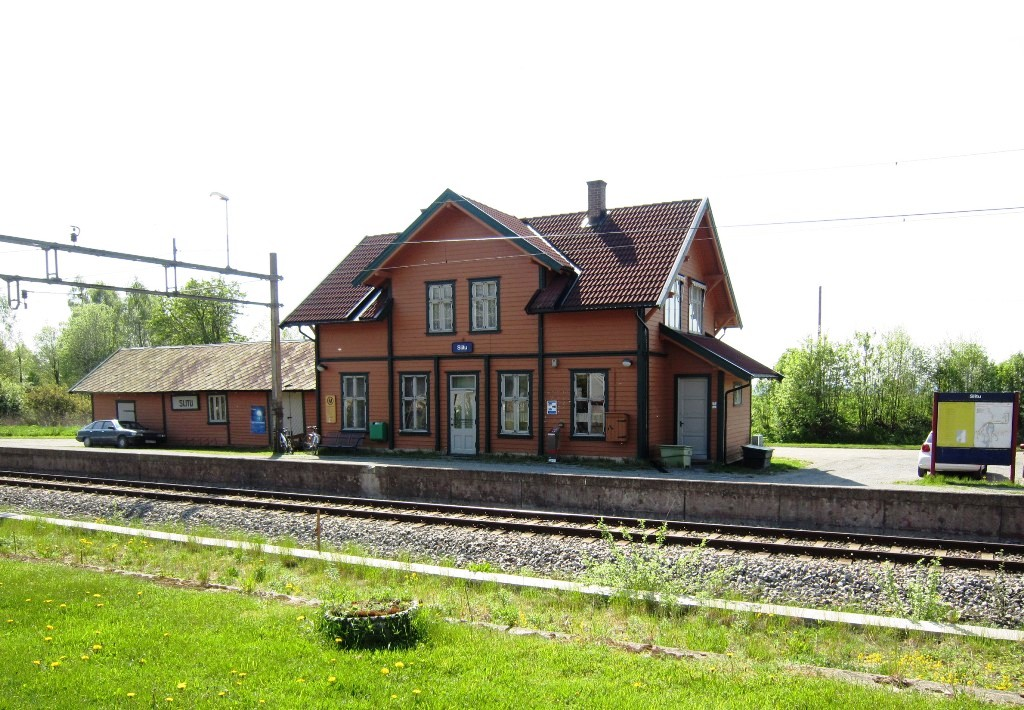

General information
- Location: Tenorveien 145, 1859 Slitu, Eidsberg; Norway
- Coordinates: 59°34′01″N 11°15′42″E
- Elevation: 131.8 m (432 ft) AMSL
- Owner: Bane NOR
- Operator: Vy
- Line: Eastern Østfold Line
- Distance: 59.33 km (36.87 mi)
- Platforms: 1 side platform
- Connections: Bus service

Construction
- Parking: 30 spaces
- Cycle facilities: Yes
- Accessible: No
- Architect: Balthazar Lange

History
- Opened: 24 November 1882

Passengers
- 2012: 7,000 (embarking and disembarking per annum)
Location
- Location within Østfold Location within Norway

Slitu Station (Norwegian: Slitu holdeplass) is a railway station of the Eastern Østfold Line situated 2 kilometers (1.2 mi) south of Slitu in Eidsberg, Norway. Situated 59.33 kilometers (36.87 mi) from Oslo Central Station (Oslo S), it is served hourly by the L22 service of the Oslo Commuter Rail.

The station, which originally provided a passing loop, was designed by Balthazar Lange and opened on 24 November 1882. The passing loop was demolished in 1969 and the station unstaffed. It mostly serves as a park and ride station for commuters from Trøgstad.

== History ==
Discussion of a railway through Eidsberg was first debated in the municipal council on 5 January 1867. The municipality approved a grant of 20,000 Norwegian speciedaler on 25 January 1873. After it was decided in 1873 that the Østfold Line was to be built, the main route controversy regarding the Eastern Line was whether it should run via Mysen, or take a straight line from Askim to Rakkestad. The railway engineers originally favored a bypass, but this was overruled by Parliament on 4 June 1874. Eidsberg was granted three stations. While there was much spectacle about the location of the other two, Mysen and Eidsberg, there was little debate about the location of Slitu. The station and line opened on 24 November 1882, although temporary traffic had taken place since July.

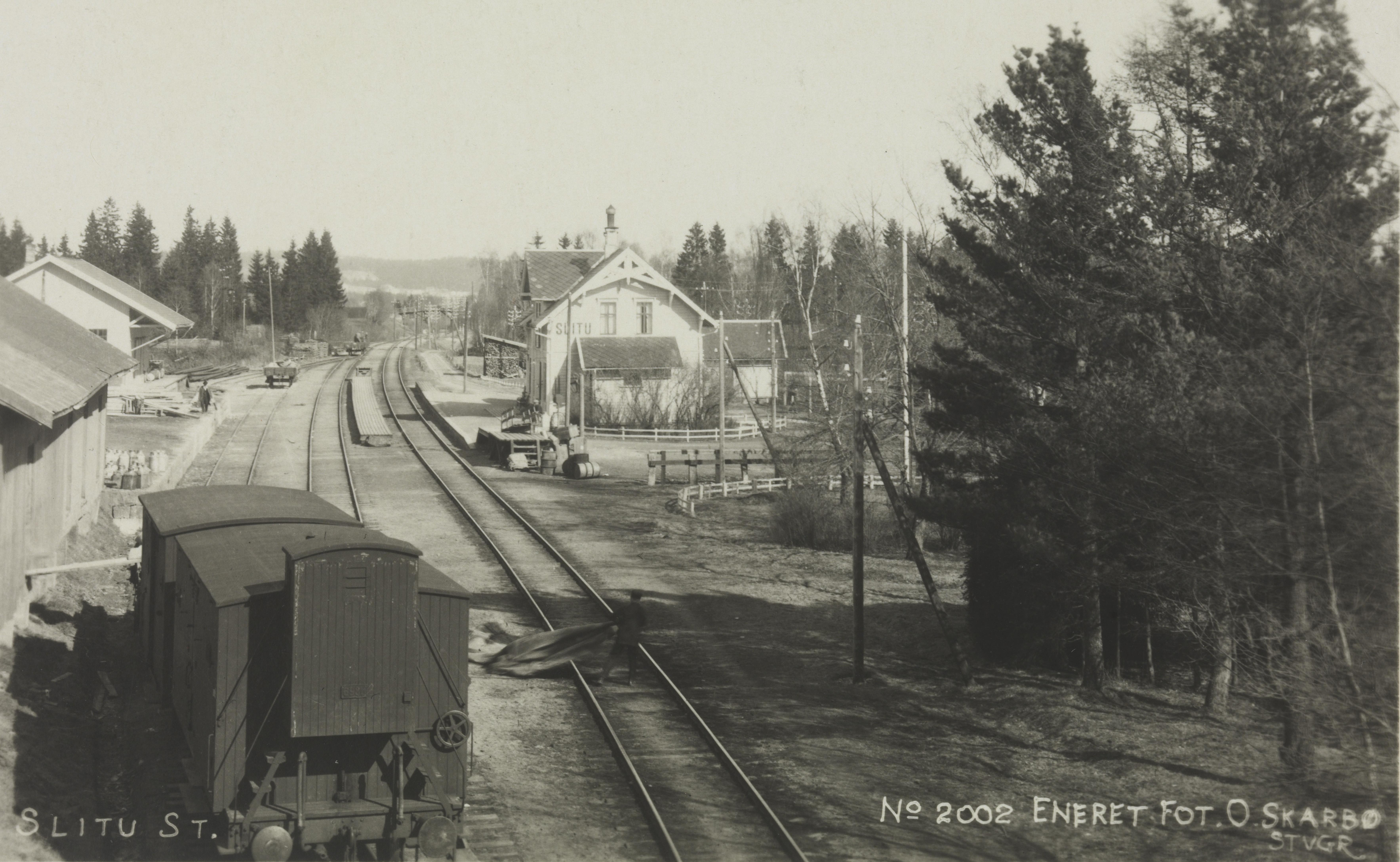
The station during the 1920s

A post office was opened at the station in 1883. The arrival of the railway made it possible to sell fresh milk in the capital. Slitu developed as one of the largest milk stations along the line, sending three to four full cars of milk each day. In addition to western parts of Eidsberg, Slitu served farms in Trøgstad. The caused the need for better roads and in 1890 and 1891 a new 4.5-kilometer (2.8 mi) road was built to Trøgstad. An interlocking system was installed at the station on 18 May 1962. This was in use until 17 March 1969, when the passing loop was removed. The station subsequently became unstaffed.

With the platform too short for new NSB Class 72 trains, the Norwegian National Rail Administration was required to lengthen the platform or close the station by 2015. They estimated the costs at 13 million Norwegian kroner. Slitu had limited patronage, with only 28 average daily boarding and disembarking passengers in 2008. This compared for instance with almost 800 at Mysen Station. Four station were therefore closed down on the line, including the next one westwards, Askim Næringspark Station. This had a marked positive effect on ridership at Slitu, with the parking lot filling up and having to be expanded.

== Facilities ==
Slitu Station situated on the Eastern Østfold Line, 35.02 kilometers (21.76 mi) from Ski Station and 59.33 kilometers (36.87 mi) from Oslo S, at an elevation of 131.8 meters (432 ft) above mean sea level. The station has a simple asphalt side platform which is 59 metres (194 ft) long with a platform height of 72 centimetres (28 in).

Slitu Station is located about 2 kilometers (1.2 mi) south of is namesake village. Only 40 people live within a one-kilometer (half-mile) radius of the station, although 666 live within 2 kilometers (1.2 mi). Its main catchment area is that of the municipality of Trøgstad, for which most riders use Slitu as a park and ride station. The station is there equipped with 30 parking spaces and a bicycle rack.

The station was designed by Balthazar Lange, who had the responsibility for all stations along the Eastern Østfold Line. The wooden building is a third-class station and has the same design as many other stations on the line, Kråkstad, Tomter, Mysen, Eidsberg, Gautestad and Ise.

== Service ==
Slitu is served with hourly L22 trains operated by Vy's Oslo Commuter Rail. Travel time is 5 minutes to Mysen, 5 minutes to Askim, 36 minutes to Ski and 50 minutes to Oslo S. The trains continue onward along the Drammen Line terminating at Skøyen Station. The station had 7,000 daily boarding and disembarking passengers in 2012, or 28 per day in 2008.

== Bibliography ==
- Bjerke, Thor; Holom, Finn (2004). Banedata 2004 (in Norwegian). Hamar / Oslo: Norwegian Railway Museum / Norwegian Railway Club. ISBN 82-90286-28-7.
- Hartmann, Eivind; Mangset, Øistein; Reisegg, Øyvind (1997). Neste stasjon (in Norwegian). Gyldendal. ISBN 82-05-25294-7.
- Langård, Geir-Widar; Ruud, Leif-Harald (2005). Sydbaneracer og Skandiapil – Glimt fra Østfoldbanen gjennom 125 år (in Norwegian). Oslo: Norwegian Railway Club. ISBN 978-82-90286-29-8.
- Thorsen, Herman (1914). Eidsberg herred – bidrag til en bygds beskrivelse (in Norwegian). Kristiania: Norli.
- Sandberg, Per-Øivind (1998). Eidsberg gjennom 150 år (in Norwegian). Mysen: Eidsberg Sparebank. ISBN 82-994680-0-0.

Preceding station			Following station
Askim; Sulerud	Eastern Østfold Line		Mysen; Sletner
Preceding station	Local trains		Following station
Askim	R22	Oslo S–Mysen	Mysen
