= Langnes station =

Former railway station in Askim, Norway

Langnes

General information
- Location: Langnes, Askim; Norway
- Coordinates: 59°36′21″N 11°7′43″E
- Line: Eastern Østfold Line
- Distance: 49.61 km (30.83 mi)
- Platforms: 1 side platform

History
- Opened: 1928
- Closed: 9 December 2012
- Rebuilt: 1989

Passengers
- 2008: 28 (daily boarding and disembarking)
Location
- Location within Østfold Location within Norway

Langnes Station (Norwegian: Langnes holdeplass) was a railway station located at Langnes in Askim, Norway. Situated on the Eastern Østfold Line, it was 49.61 kilometers (30.83 mi) from Oslo Central Station (Oslo S). Established as a flag stop in 1928, it saw limited traffic, with only 28 daily boarding and disembarking passengers in 2008. The station was moved 300 meters (980 ft) eastwards in 1989. It consisted of a simple side platform and a shed. The station closed on 9 November 2012.

== History ==
Langnes was established as a flag stop in 1928, when the Norwegian State Railways introduced flag stops at a large number of intersections along the Eastern Østfold Line in order to compete better with bus and truck services. Langnes was at the time situated 25.02 kilometers (15.55 mi) from Ski. The station was moved 300 meters (980 ft) eastwards from 1 February 1989. The moving involved building a new platform and shed, which was situated on the other side of the tracks as before.

Due to the short platform, the Norwegian National Rail Administration was required by the Norwegian Railway Authority to either upgrade the platforms or close the station by 2012. The Rail Administration evaluated that the station had limited patronage and little possibilities of future growth and therefore decided to close it and three other stations on the line. Participating factors was that any expansion of the station and any new parking spaces would have to be taken from agricultural land. The closing took effect on 9 December 2012.

== Facilities ==
Langnes Station was situated on the Eastern Østfold Line, 25.32 kilometers (15.73 mi) from Ski Station and 49.61 kilometers (30.83 mi) from Oslo S. The station had a simple side platform which was 25 metres (82 ft) long with a platform height of 55 centimetres (22 in) and a waiting shed.

The station was situated in an agricultural area with little population in the immediate vicinity. Access was available via a gravel road, with limited sign posting which made it difficult to find. There were about 500 people living within a 1 kilometer (0.6 mi) radius of the station. There were 1,223 within 2 kilometers (1.2 mi). Most of the population within the catchment area lived at Ihlen. The station had 28 daily boarding and disembarking passengers in 2008.

Preceding station		Following station
Spydeberg	Eastern Østfold Line	Askim
