= Eidsberg Station =

Railway station in Eidsberg, Norway

Eidsberg
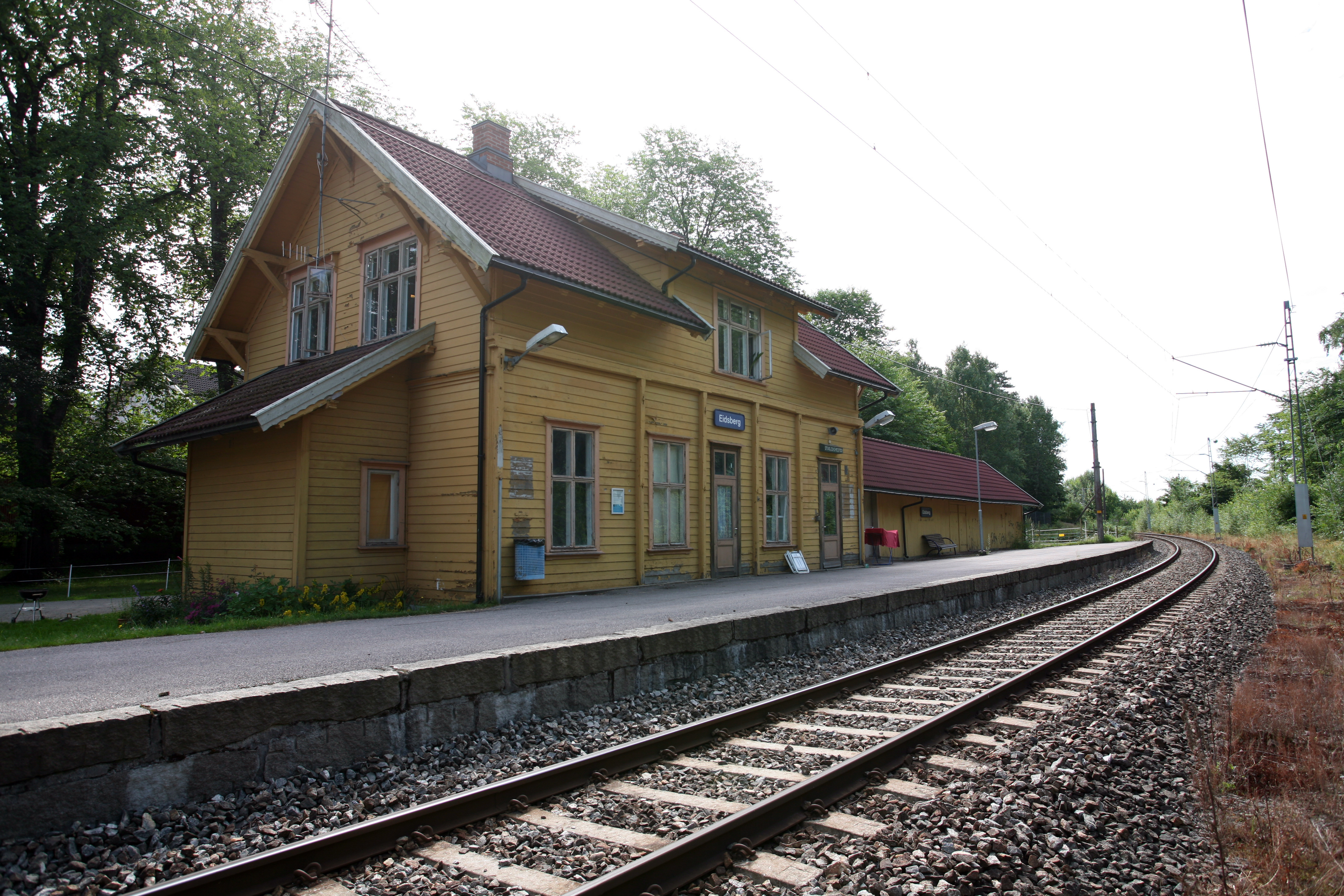

General information
- Location: Stasjonsveien 412, 1830 Eidsberg; Norway
- Coordinates: 59°30′48″N 11°18′13″E
- Elevation: 152.8 m (501 ft) AMSL
- Owner: Bane NOR
- Operator: Vy
- Line: Eastern Østfold Line
- Distance: 68.63 km (42.64 mi) from Oslo S
- Platforms: 1 side platform
- Connections: Bus service

Construction
- Parking: 10 spaces
- Architect: Balthazar Lange

History
- Opened: 24 November 1882

Passengers
- 2012: 3,400 (boarding and disembarking annually)
Location
- Location within Østfold Location within Norway

Eidsberg Station (Norwegian: Eidsberg holdeplass) is a railway station of the Eastern Østfold Line located in at Finnestad in Eidsberg, Norway. Situated 68.63 kilometers (42.64 mi) from Oslo Central Station (Oslo S), it is only served by extra rush-hour R22 service of the Oslo Commuter Rail. The station, which originally provided a passing loop, was designed by Balthazar Lange and opened on 24 November 1882. The passing loop was demolished in 1989 and the station unstaffed. It was renovated as a heritage site in 2014.

== History ==
Discussion of a railway through Eidsberg was first debated in the municipal council on 5 January 1867. The municipality approved a grant of 20,000 Norwegian speciedaler on 25 January 1873. After it was decided in 1873 that the Østfold Line was to be built, the main route controversy regarding the Eastern Line was whether it should run via Mysen, or take a straight line from Askim to Rakkestad. The railway engineers originally favored a bypass, but this was overruled by Parliament on 4 June 1874. Eidsberg was granted three stations. The southernmost was the most controversial and stirred up much local debate. The main proposed locations were Finnestad, Gjerud and Gutu. The municipal council ultimately voted on 1 May 1880 to let the decision fall on the railway company. The station and line opened on 24 November 1882, although temporary traffic had taken place since July. Many of the protests from the southern part of the municipality were met in 1895, when Heia Station opened.

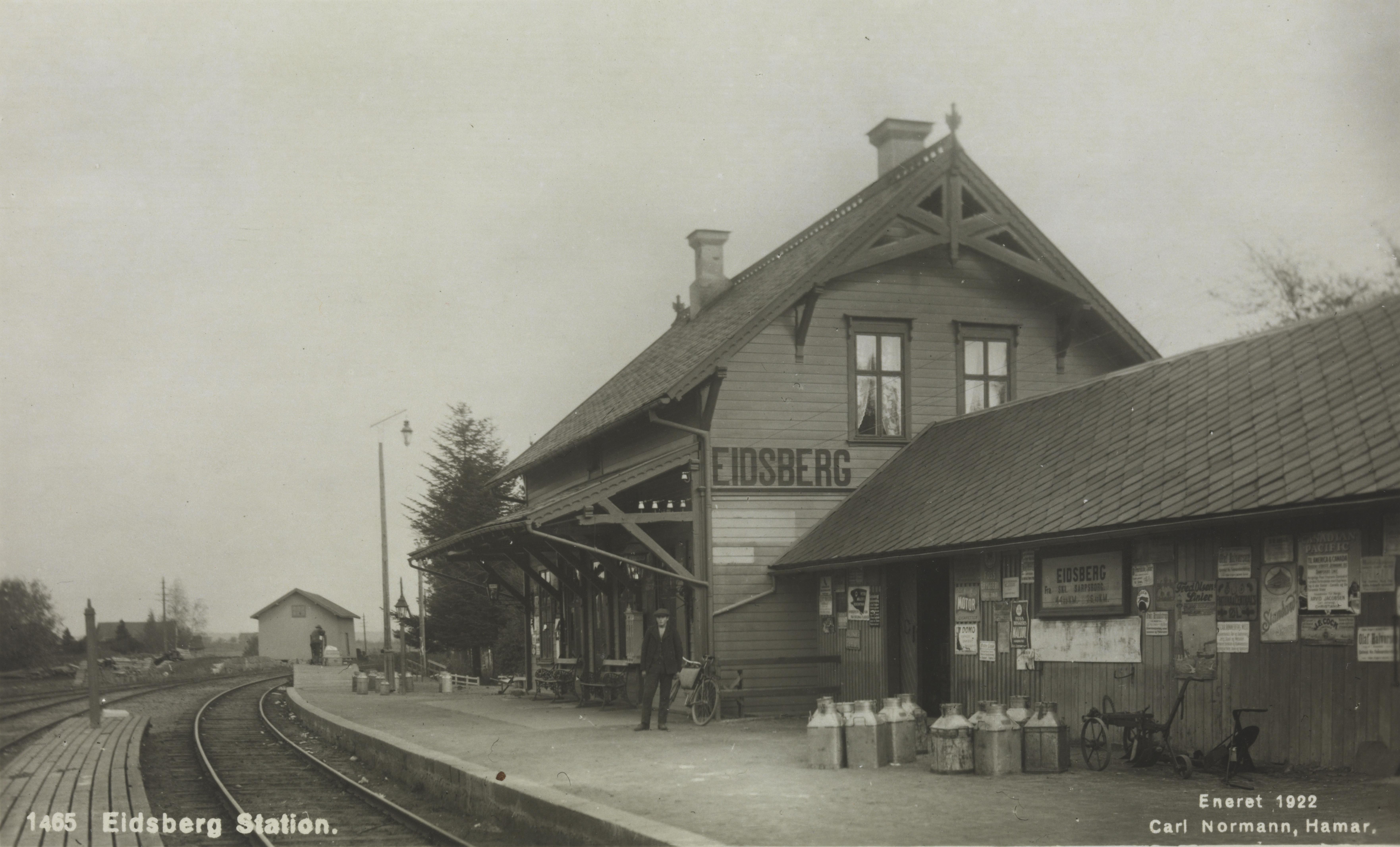
The station before 1922

Eidsberg Station grew up as a community hub and featured at various times a store, post office, telegraph, café, bakery and fuel station. However, there never grew up a village around station like many other of the stations in the area. The post office opened in 1885, and a year later a warehouse for Felleskjøpet was erected next to the station. A road was built from the station to Huseby in 1910. Eidsberg and Mysen were split into two municipalities in 1920. Unlike around Mysen Station, Eidsberg Station had never developed into a town. Some people called for the new municipal hall to be built next to the station so a new village could be built around them. This was not done and instead it was placed at Søndre Mysen. Despite efforts, only nine lots were sold around Eidsberg Station the following one and a half decade.

An interlocking system was installed at the station on 22 January 1971. The station became unstaffed from 1 January 1989. The passing loop was disabled on 22 May. The station building was renovated by Rom Eiendom in 2014 for a cost of 2.5 million Norwegian kroner. In addition to bringing it up to modern standards, the work restored the window and door designs from 1882. This was part of a project to make the station a cultural heritage site. Eidsberg is the only station along either of the Østfold Lines which has received such a renovation.

== Facilities ==
Eidsberg Station situated on the Eastern Østfold Line, 44.43 kilometers (27.61 mi) from Ski Station and 68.63 kilometers (42.64 mi) from Oslo S, at an elevation of 152.8 meters (501 ft) above mean sea level. The station has a simple asphalt side platform which is 73 metres (240 ft) long with a platform height of 51 centimetres (20 in). The station is located in a rural area and has 10 parking spaces for cars.

The station was designed by Balthazar Lange in Swiss chalet style, who had the responsibility for all stations along the Eastern Østfold Line. The wooden building is a third-class station and has the same design as many other stations on the line, Kråkstad, Tomter, Slitu, Mysen, Gautestad and Ise. The station building is 413 square meters (4,450 sq ft), including a goods shed built as an annex. The station building is listed as a cultural heritage site. The upper floor is rented out as a residence, while the ground floor is rented out as for commerce.

== Service ==
Eidsberg is served with two daily R22 trains operated by Vy's Oslo Commuter Rail. The station had 3,400 daily boarding and disembarking passengers in 2012.

== Bibliography ==
- Bjerke, Thor; Holom, Finn (2004). Banedata 2004 (in Norwegian). Hamar / Oslo: Norwegian Railway Museum / Norwegian Railway Club. ISBN 82-90286-28-7.
- Hartmann, Eivind; Mangset, Øistein; Reisegg, Øyvind (1997). Neste stasjon (in Norwegian). Gyldendal. ISBN 82-05-25294-7.
- Langård, Geir-Widar; Ruud, Leif-Harald (2005). Sydbaneracer og Skandiapil – Glimt fra Østfoldbanen gjennom 125 år (in Norwegian). Oslo: Norwegian Railway Club. ISBN 978-82-90286-29-8.
- Sandberg, Per-Øivind (1998). Eidsberg gjennom 150 år (in Norwegian). Mysen: Eidsberg Sparebank. ISBN 82-994680-0-0.
- Thorsen, Herman (1914). Eidsberg herred – bidrag til en bygds beskrivelse (in Norwegian). Kristiania: Norli.

Preceding station			Following station
Mysen	Eastern Østfold Line		Heia
Preceding station	Local trains		Following station
Mysen	R22	Oslo S–Mysen	Heia
