= Eastern Østfold Line =

Railway line in Norway

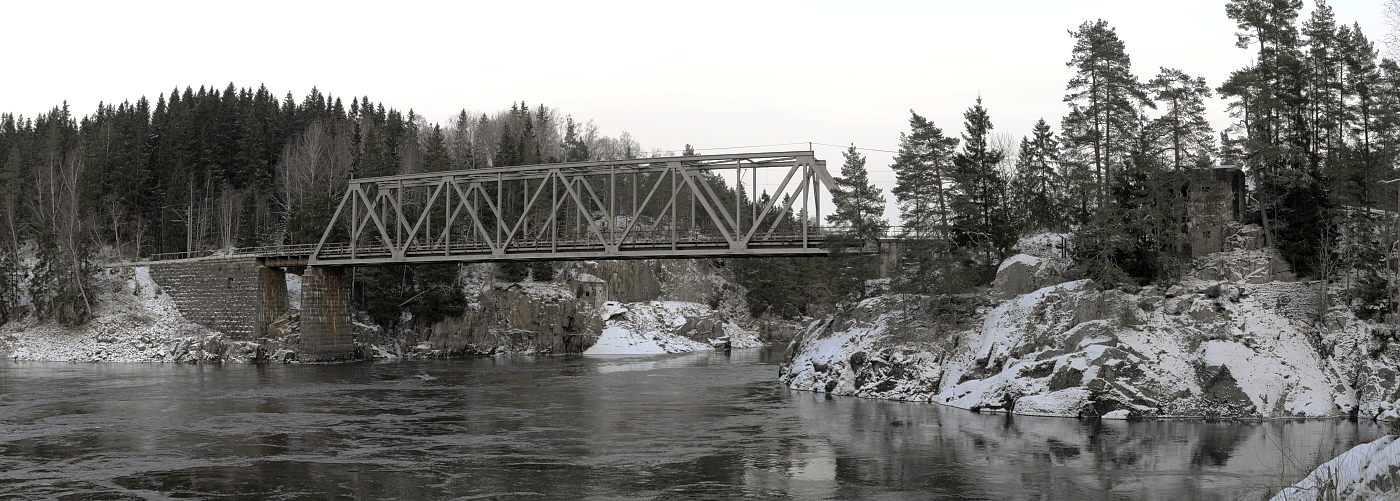
- Langnes Bridge

Overview
- Owner: Bane NOR
- Termini: Ski Station; Sarpsborg Station
- Stations: 12

Service
- Type: Railway
- Operator: Vy
- Rolling stock: Class 75

History
- Opened: 24 November 1882

Technical
- Line length: 78.9 km (49.0 mi)
- Number of tracks: Single
- Character: Commuter trains
- Track gauge: 1,435 mm (4 ft 8 1/2 in) Standard gauge
- Electrification: 15 kV 16.7 Hz AC
- Signalling: ETCS Level 2 in-cab signalling

The Eastern Østfold Line (Norwegian: Østfoldbanens østlige linje) is a 79-kilometer (49 mi) railway line which runs between Ski and Sarpsborg. It follows a more eastern route than the Østfold Line, with which it adjoins at both Ski Station and Sarpsborg Station, serving the Indre Østfold district. The line is single track and electrified. The Eastern Line serves the hourly R22 services of the Oslo Commuter Rail, operated by Vy. There is no regular traffic south of Rakkestad Station, although the line can be used for freight trains when the Western Line is closed.

The line was built at the same time as the Østfold Line, but opened three years later, on 24 November 1882. Stations were designed by Balthazar Lange. The Eastern Line has always featured fewer trains and had a lower standard. The line was electrified in 1958. It became the first line in Norway to feature the European Rail Traffic Management System, becoming operational in 2015.

== Route ==
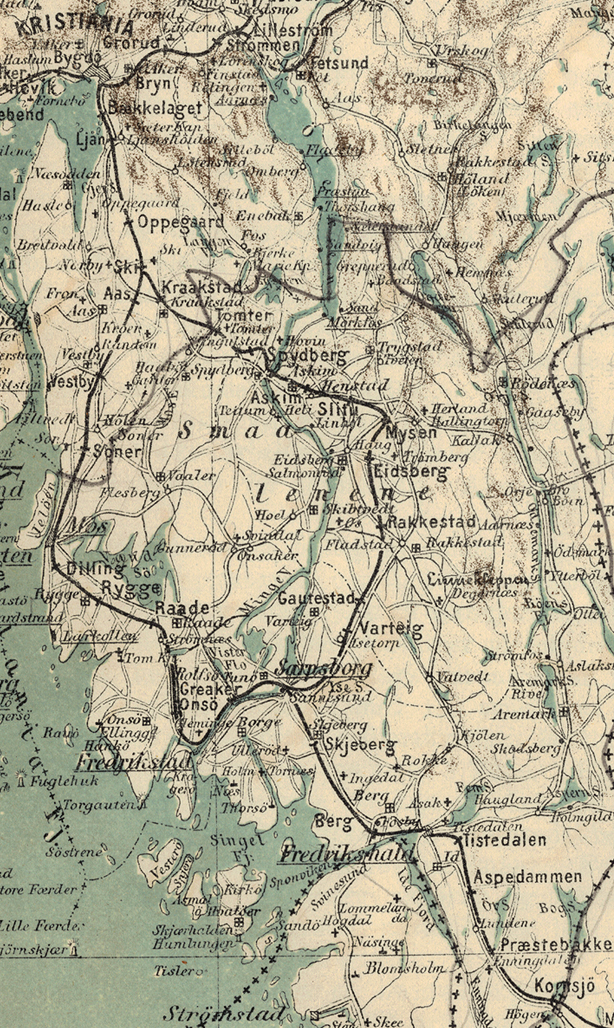
Map of the Smaalenene Line in 1884; the line still follows the same route.

The Eastern Østfold Line runs from Ski Station through the municipalities of Ski, Tomter, Hobøl, Eidsberg, Mysen, Rakkestad and Sarpsborg. It largely runs eastwards from Ski, then turns southward at Mysen. With a length of 78.9 kilometers (49.0 mi) it provides an alternative route to the Østfold Line between Ski and Sarpsborg. The line is single track and electrified at 15 kV 16.7 Hz AC. It is the only railway in Norway to feature ERTMS, with both GSM-R and European Train Control System (ETCS) Level 2. The line's peak elevation of 153 meters (502 ft) is reached at Eidsberg Station.

The term Østfold Line is most commonly used to describe the section from Oslo via Moss to Kornsjø. This is sometimes also referred to as the Western Line. Both uses exclude the section from Ski via Askim to Sarpsborg, known as the Eastern Line. At other times Østfold Line is used to refer to the entire network, both via Moss and Askim. Sometimes Western Line is used to only describe the section from Ski via Moss to Sarpsborg. Although the eastern and western branches were initially planned as equals, the western has become dominant due to it always having had a higher standard and serving all through trains.

== History ==
=== Planning ===
The lack of early interest in a railway in Østfold was caused by the ice-free Oslofjord and the perceived non-necessity of build a line where a suitable waterway already existed. Proposals for a railway through the county then known as Smaalenene were first launched with two independent letters to the editor in 1866. They exemplified the debate which would follow, with one proposing a route along the coast through the larger coastal towns, while the other proposed an inner route via Askim and Rakkestad. Preliminary surveys were carried out the following year, which also investigated two routes to the Swedish border, one via Tistedalen and one along Iddefjord. The government was at first less enthusiastic, in part because they were concerned that no line would be built on the Swedish side.

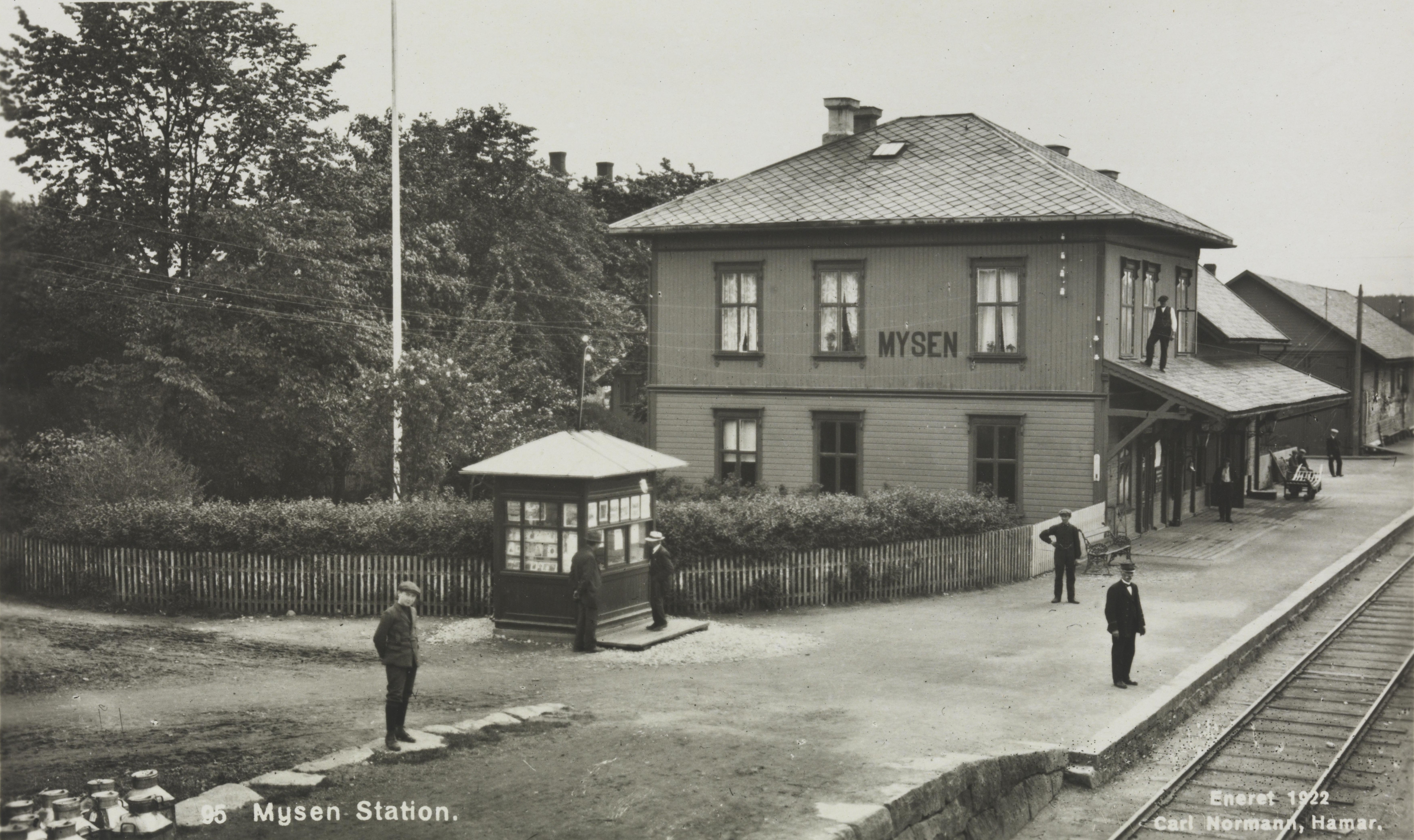
Mysen Station in 1922. The station building was demolished in 1989

By 1872 the disagreement over an interior or coastal route was raging and a compromise was proposed in which the line would be built with two branches. The government recommended a twin-armed line on 5 April 1873 and was approved in Parliament on 5 June. Detailed surveying was led by Carl Abraham Pihl and concluded on 31 March 1874. He wanted the route to take the shortest possible way from Askim to Rakkestad, bypassing Mysen. The short-cut was not endorsed by Parliament. With increasing cost estimates, Parliament decided to reduce the standard on the Eastern Line. The line was approved with 59 against 42 votes in Parliament on 4 June 1874.

=== Construction ===
Construction commenced in 1874, initially only on the section from Oslo to Halden. Work was subdivided into eleven sections on the Western Line and four on the Eastern Line. The former received a rail weight of 30 kilograms per meter (60 lb/ft). Work on the Eastern Line did not start until 1877. It received a track weight of only 25 kilograms per meter (50 lb/ft). A recession hit in 1877 and the government stopped all construction for a period, initially only continuing it on the Western Line. This caused an uproar along the line and municipal councils sent inn demands that construction resume. Funding was thus granted again in 1878. About 1,100 people were hired to work on the Eastern Line. Most of the workforce were Swedish immigrants. Groundwork was conducted directly by the railway based on accords, with the track was laid by contractors.

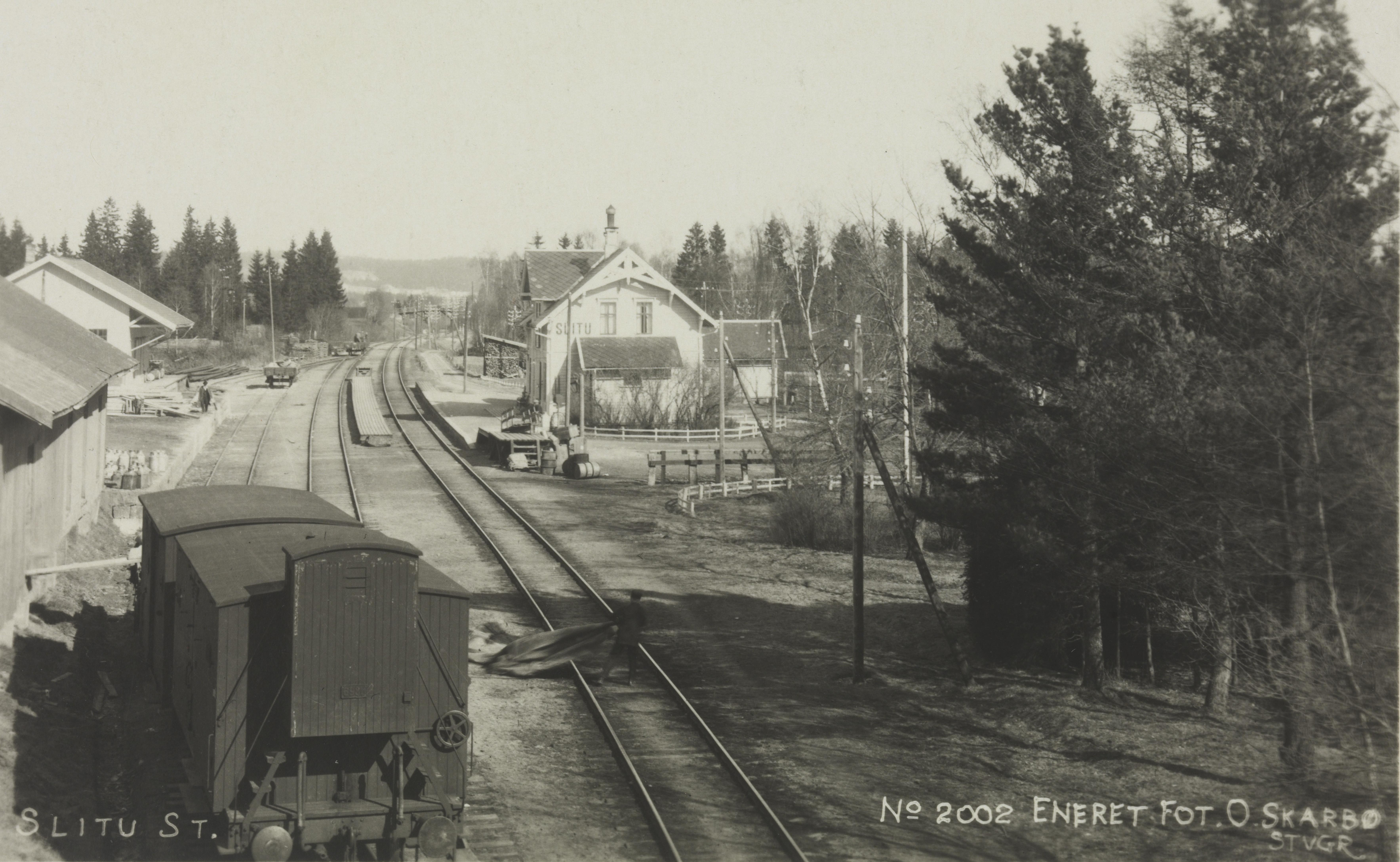
Slitu Station during the 1920s

The Østfold Line was the first railway in Norway were all bridges were built with iron. This allowed for the construction of viaducts at some places, which changed the mass balance allowing the line to follow a better gradient. The most prominent on the Eastern Line was the Solberg Viaduct, the Hobøl Viaduct and the Langnes Bridge. The bridges and viaducts were all designed by Axel Jacob Petersson.

The Western Line from Oslo to Halden was taken into revenue service on 2 January 1879. Construction of the Eastern Line was delayed and was opened in stages. The section from Ski to Spydeberg taken into use on 1 February 1882. Next followed the line to Slitu on 17 July. Ordinary operations commenced on 24 November.

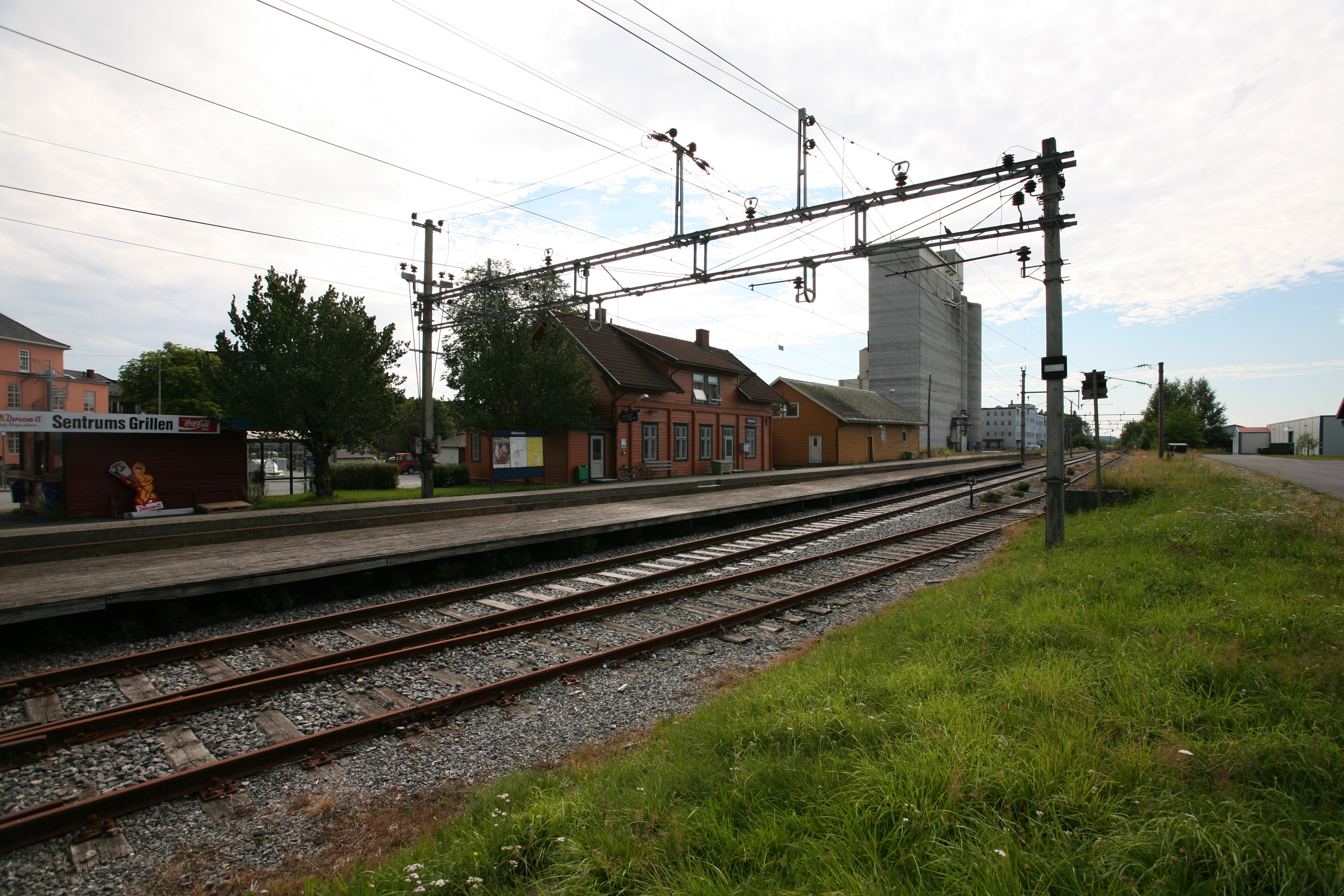
Rakkestad Station became the center of its namesake municipality and was one of several stations which received a grain silo

=== Steam operations ===
From the 1890s there were two morning trains which ran from Mysen to Oslo. The station was therefore equipped with a roundhouse for two locomotives. A military battery was established at Langnes Bridge in 1899.

Askim Station became a hub for three branch lines. The Kykkelsrud Line was built in 1899to allow access to the pulp mill Glommens Træslliperi. It was extended to Kykkelsrud between 1914 and 1918 in conjunction with the construction of Kykkelsrud Power Station. The Vamma Line was completed in 1909 and later extended. It was used to construct Vamma Power Station. The first was the Solbergfoss Line, which opened in 1918 to allow the construction of Solbergfoss Power Station. The line proved popular and continued with passenger train operations until 4 January 1965. Hafslund built the Hafslund Line from the Eastern Line to their main plant. Built between 1897 and 1899, it remained in use until 1974. The same years there was also a branch line from Rakkestad Station to Rakkestad Tegelverk.

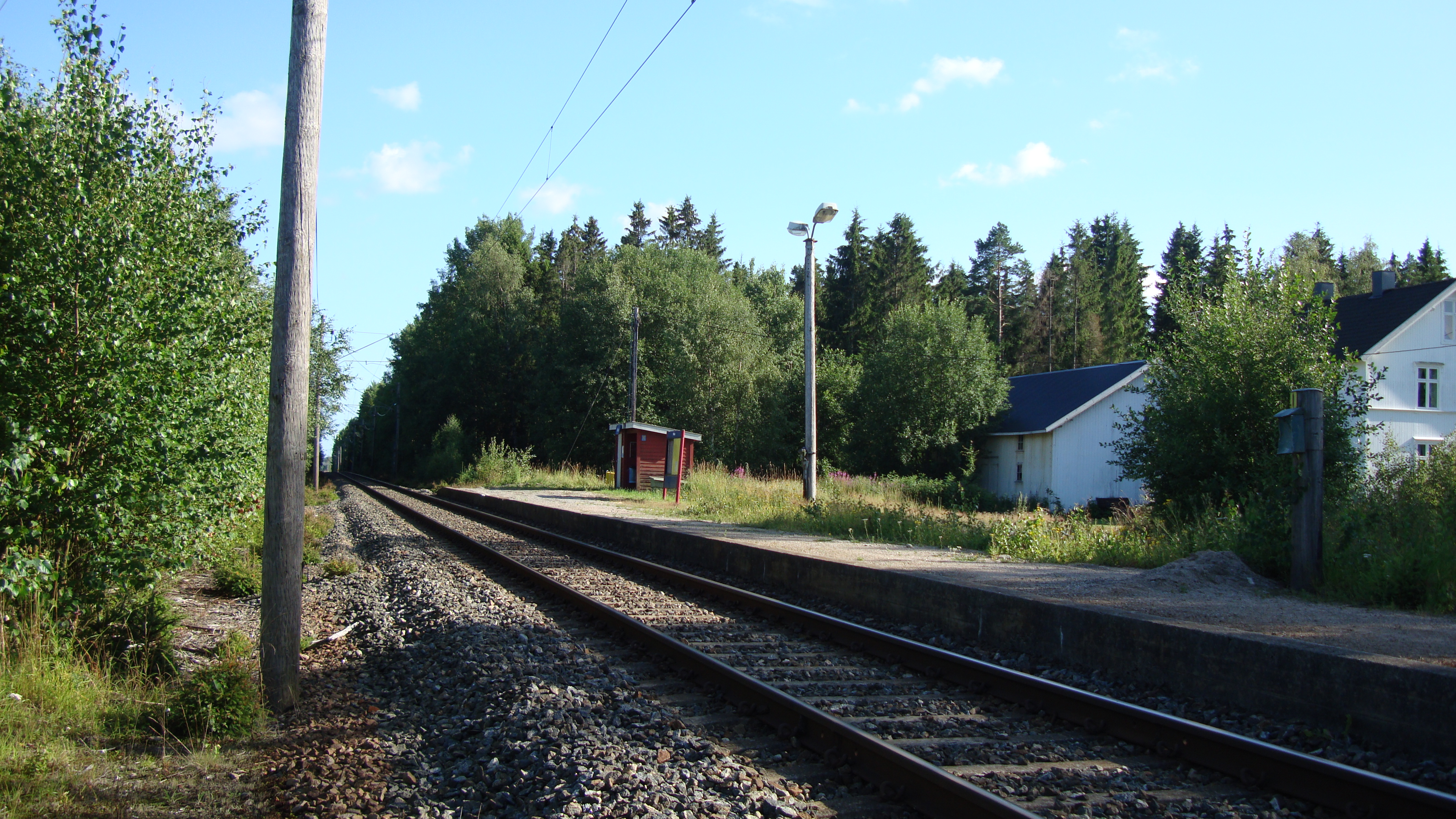
Heia Station was typical for new stations established in 1928, with a simple shed and platform near a level crossing

Railcars were introduced on the Eastern Line in 1928. This was a move to make the train more competitive against buses and trucks, which had better surface coverage than the train. The railcars would initially stop at request, normally at level crossings. This was formalized in 1932, when 38 new stations were official established. A large number of these were closed in 1947. The Østfold Line was electrified in 1940, after which all trains on the Eastern Line stopped at Ski for transshipment. Throughout the 1950s there grew up more urban areas around some of the largest stations. The most prominent were Askim, Mysen and Rakkestad, which all received a prominent town center and grain silos.

=== Electric operations ===
The Eastern Line was finished electrified on 4 December 1958. The allowed for faster and direct services to the capital. The electrification cost 17 million kroner. Services were predominantly offered with NSB Class 68 multiple units. Later NSB Class 69 became prominent, but the Eastern Line was among the last lines to see them in regular use. When NSB Class 72 was introduced in 2002, the Eastern Line was among the first places it was introduced. Passenger services between Rakkestad and Sarpsborg were terminated on 15 June 2003.

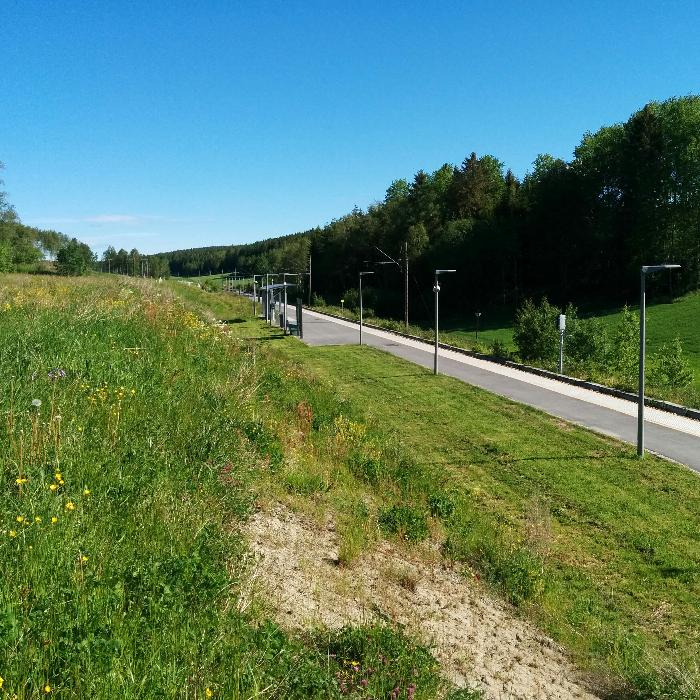
Knapstad Station was upgraded with a new platform in 2012

A triangular track was installed at Hafslund Station south of Sarpsborg, operative from 7 April 1995. Trains which wanted to run from the Eastern Line southwards towards Halden previously had to drive into Sarpsborg Station and then change direction. The new 472-meter (1,549 ft) connection line made this unnecessary. Four stations with very low patronage, Drømtorp, Langli, Langnes and Askim Næringspark, were closed in 2012.

The Eastern Østfold Line was chosen as a trial line for implementing the European Rail Traffic Management System in Norway. Trials first ran in November 2013 on the section from Rakkestad to Sarpsborg, as this line did not have regular traffic. The entire line was upgraded for a total 1.2 billion kroner in the following years. In addition to a new signaling system and centralized traffic control, the platforms and stations at Kråkstad, Tomter, Spydeberg, Askim and Mysen were modernized. At the same time NSB started using their newest Class 75 multiple units. The upgrades were official opened on 31 August 2015.

== Operations ==
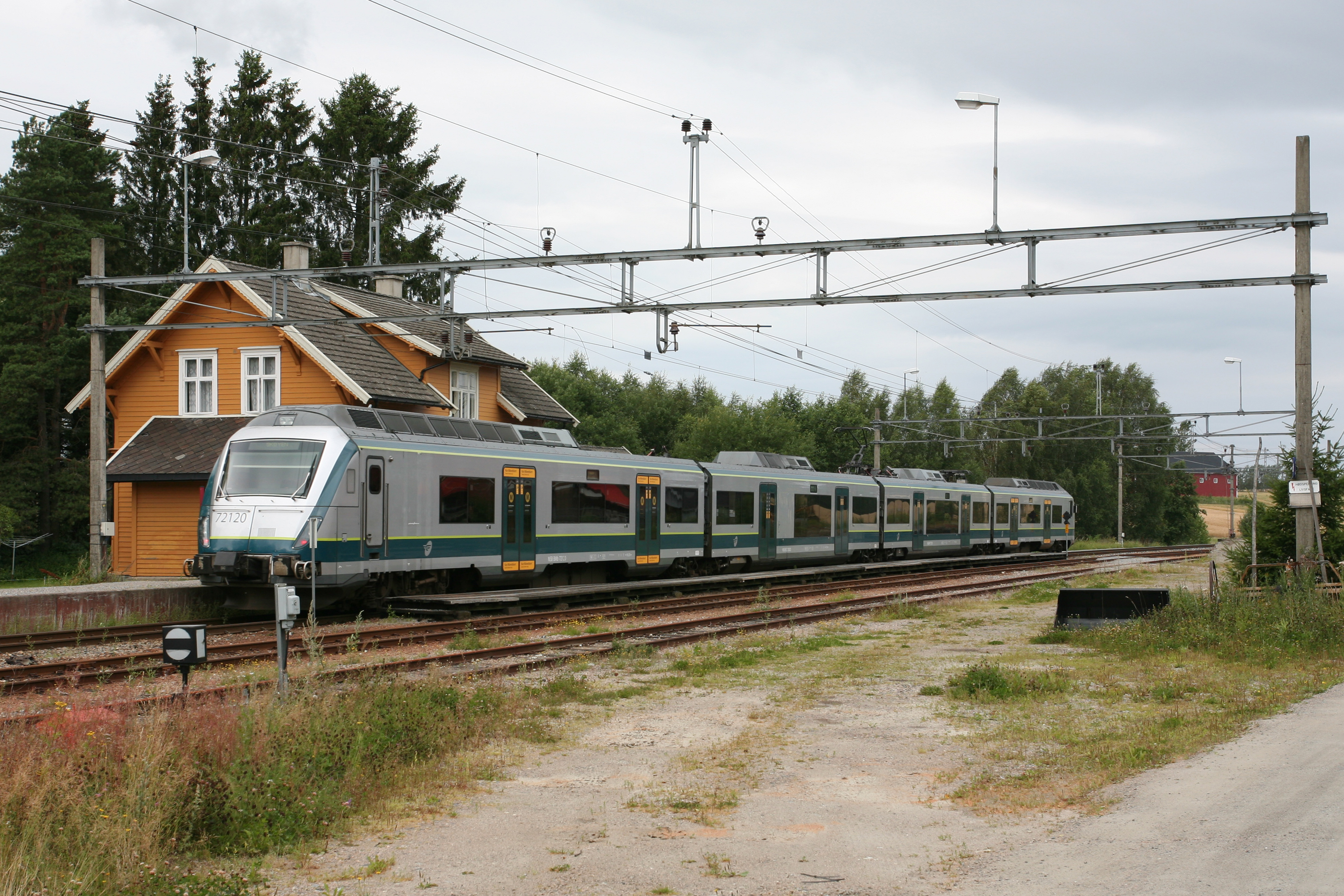
NSB Class 72 commuter train at Kråkstad Station

Regular trains on the Eastern Østfold Line consist of an hourly service from Mysen to Ski and onward via the Østfold Line to Oslo Central Station and then onwards along the Drammen Line to Skøyen Station. In addition there are some rush-hour trains which operate all the way to Rakkestad. Travel time from Mysen to Oslo S is one hour and four minutes, and 41 minutes to Ski.

There is no regular freight traffic on the line. However, if there are closures of the Western Østfold Line, the Eastern Line can be used as a bypass if the trains are equipped with ERTMS.

== Architecture ==
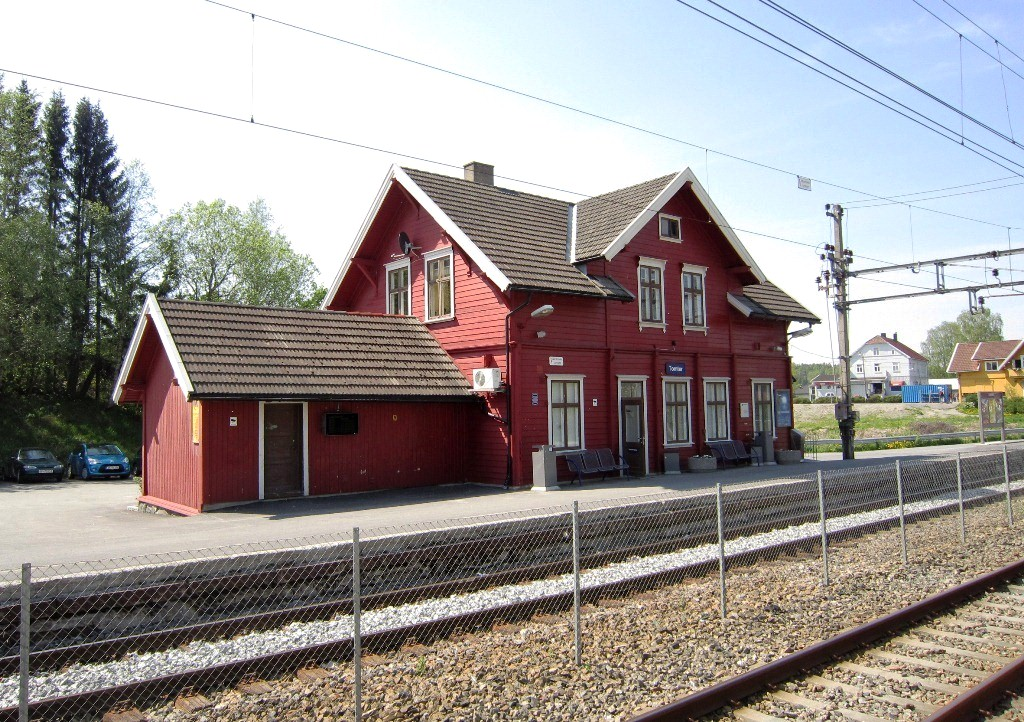
Tomter Station was one of the third-class stations designed by Balthazar Lange

Peter Andreas Blix was hired to design the stations on the Østfold Line, but quit before those on the Eastern Line were designed. The job thus fell to his successor Balthazar Lange, who continued largely in the same style as Blix. The Eastern Line received standardized designs. Second-class stations were built at Spydeberg, Askim and Rakkestad, each which were 123 square meters (1,320 sq ft). Third-class stations were built at Kråkstad, Tomter, Slitu, Mysen, Eidsberg, Gautestad and Ise. All the buildings were wooden with rich decorations, especially on the gables.

== Future ==
The Follo Line is under construction and is scheduled for completion in December 2022. It will allow trains to run directly from Ski to Oslo in 11 minutes, down from 23 minutes today. The National Rail Administration has expressed desires to cut the travel time from Mysen to Oslo to 45 minutes. Removal of less used stations, better signaling and the Follo Line are the means by which they hope to achieve this. Critical for this is to reroute the access from the Eastern Line in to Ski Station. With the current layout, they come in from the east and as such cannot access the new line without crossing over all the tracks. To avoid this, a new connection needs to be built with the Eastern Line leaving Ski Station to the south, the one track flying over Western Line and then following a new route to a point around Kråkstad Station.

== Bibliography ==
- Bjerke, Thor; Holom, Finn (2004). Banedata 2004 (in Norwegian). Hamar / Oslo: Norwegian Railway Museum / Norwegian Railway Club. ISBN 82-90286-28-7.
- Langård, Geir-Widar; Ruud, Leif-Harald (2005). Sydbaneracer og Skandiapil – Glimt fra Østfoldbanen gjennom 125 år (in Norwegian). Oslo: Norwegian Railway Club. ISBN 978-82-90286-29-8.
