= Mysen Station =

Railway station in Eidsberg, Norway

Mysen
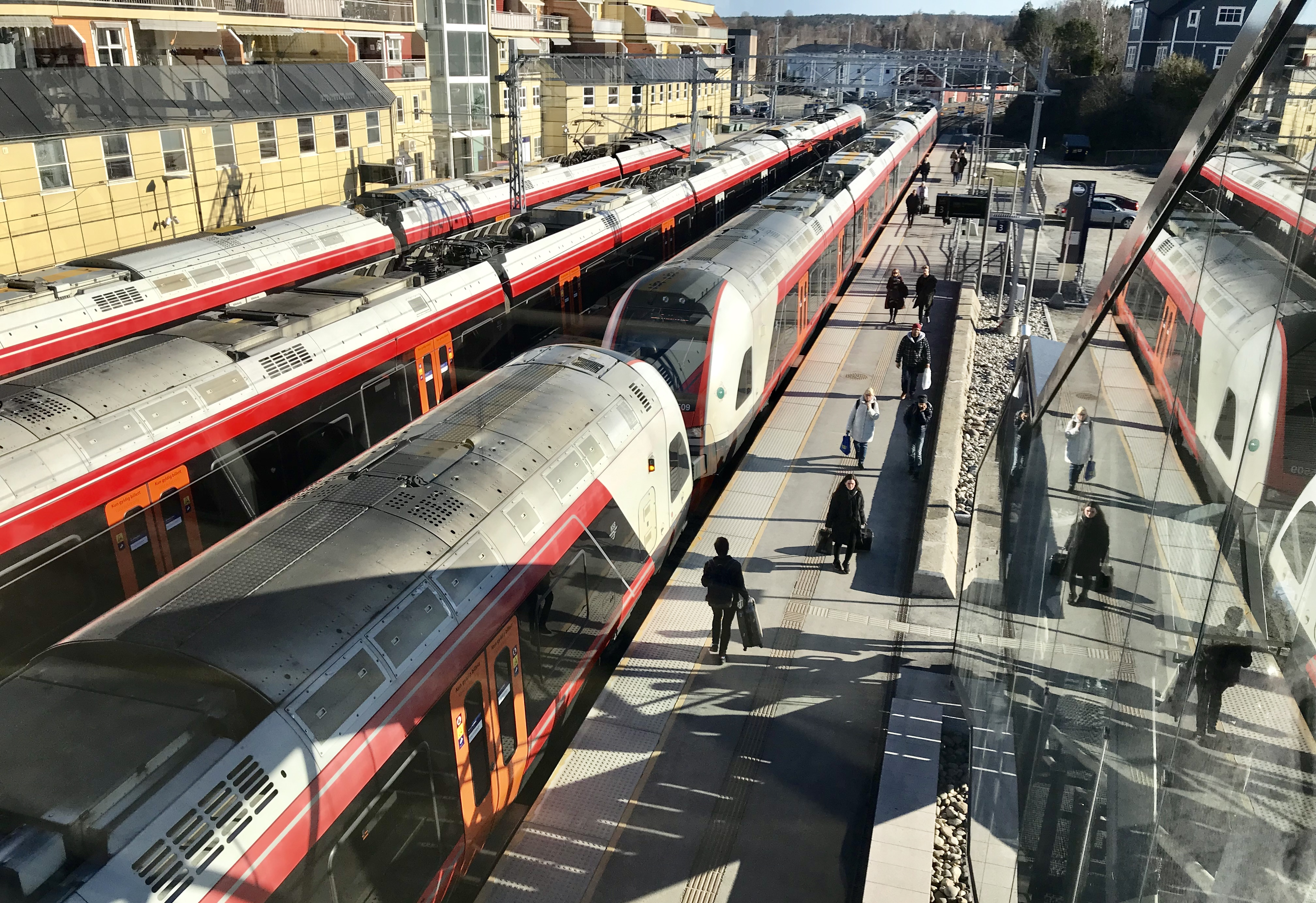

General information
- Location: Jernbanegt. 2, Mysen, Indre Østfold; Norway
- Coordinates: 59°33′15″N 11°19′25″E
- Elevation: 106.7 m (350 ft) AMSL
- Owner: Bane NOR
- Operator: Vy
- Line: Eastern Østfold Line
- Distance: 64.77 km (40.25 mi) from Oslo S
- Platforms: 2 side platforms
- Tracks: 3
- Connections: Bus: Østfold Kollektivtrafikk

Construction
- Accessible: Yes
- Architect: Balthazar Lange

Other information
- Station code: MYS

History
- Opened: 24 November 1882
- Rebuilt: 2014

Passengers
- 2012: 251,000 (boarding and disembarking annually)
Location
- Location within Østfold Location within Norway

Mysen Station (Norwegian: Mysen stasjon) is a railway station located at Mysen in Eidsberg, Norway. Situated 64.77 kilometers (40.25 mi) from Oslo Central Station (Oslo S), it is served hourly by the L22 service of the Oslo Commuter Rail. It is the terminus of most L22 services. The station had 251,000 boarding and disembarking passengers in 2012.

The station opened on 24 November 1882 with a station building designed by Balthazar Lange in Swiss chalet style. The town of Mysen grew up around the station, and soon features the municipal center, shopping and industry. A grain elevator was built in 1953. The original station was demolished in 1986 to make way for a building complex. The station platforms were modernized in 2014.

== History ==
Discussion of a railway through Eidsberg was first debated in the municipal council on 5 January 1867. The municipality approved a grant of 20,000 Norwegian speciedaler on 25 January 1873. After it was decided in 1873 that the Østfold Line was to be built, the main route controversy regarding the Eastern Line was whether it should run via Mysen, or take a straight line from Askim to Rakkestad. The railway engineers originally favored a bypass, but this was overruled by Parliament on 4 June 1874. Eidsberg was granted three stations. There was consensus about the location of Slitu Station, but both Eidsberg Station and Mysen Station were the subject of a major dispute.

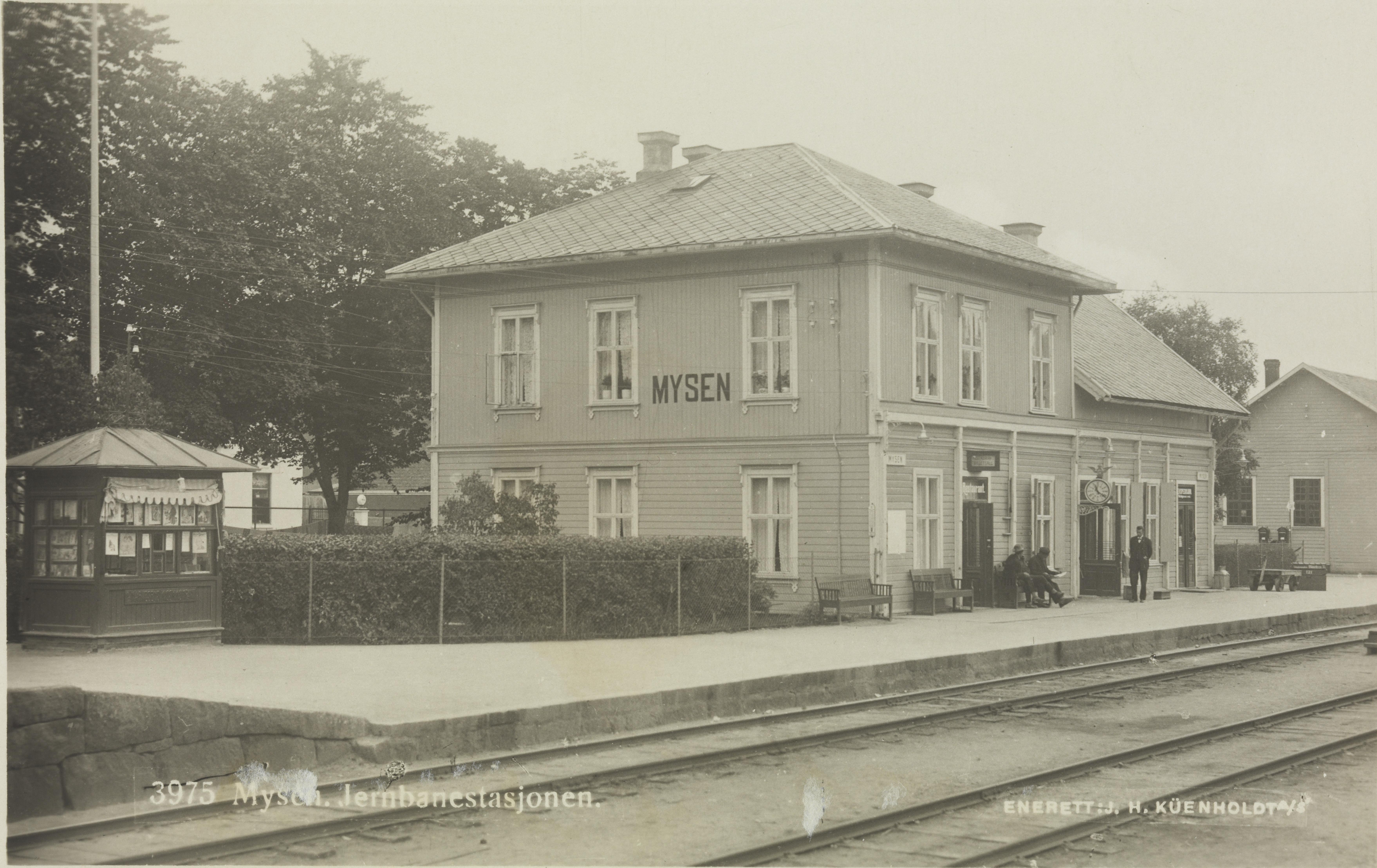
The station building

One fraction supported building the main station near Eidsberg Church. This had the added bonus of being close to the ferry quay at Grønsund and was a central transport hub in the community. These proposals called for a line traversing the municipality from Moss via Eidsberg to Ørje. Once such a route was discarded in 1873, the debate cooked down to a route to the east or to the west, close to the river Glomma. The eastern alternative was ultimately victorious. The station and line opened on 24 November 1882, although temporary traffic had taken place since July.

The establishment at Mysen had a dramatic impact on Eidsberg. With the railway Mysen received a post office and telegraph. The central areas had previously been at Folkenborg, where the municipal hall and Eidsberg Sparebank was located, and the area around Eidsberg Church. Many companies and shops moved to Mysen, and both the municipal hall and the bank moved there in 1900. The largest cargo customer with the railway was the forest industry. Also farmers benefited, as the railway made it possible to export milk to the capital. The railway caused the first dairy in Eidsberg to opened in 1883, next to Mysen Station.

Originally there was a daily morning train starting in Mysen and running to Oslo and then returning. From the 1890s this increased to two. Mysen was the main station along the Eastern Line and the only station to feature an engine shed and a turntable. During the 1910s there were discussions of extending the Urskog–Høland Line to Mysen. This would allow a direct railway between Østfold and Romerike, bypassing Oslo. The proposal never passed the idea stage. The Norwegian resistance movement carried out a sabotage at Mysen Station in 1943 in which both the switches and two locomotives were blown up.

A grain elevator was built next to the station in 1953. The line was electrified on 5 December 1958. This allowed for the retirement of steam locomotives and the closing of the roundhouse. At the same time direct services to the capital were reintroduced. An interlocking system was installed on 5 April 1968. At a later date, all ticket sales were transferred to the Narvesen kiosk at the station.

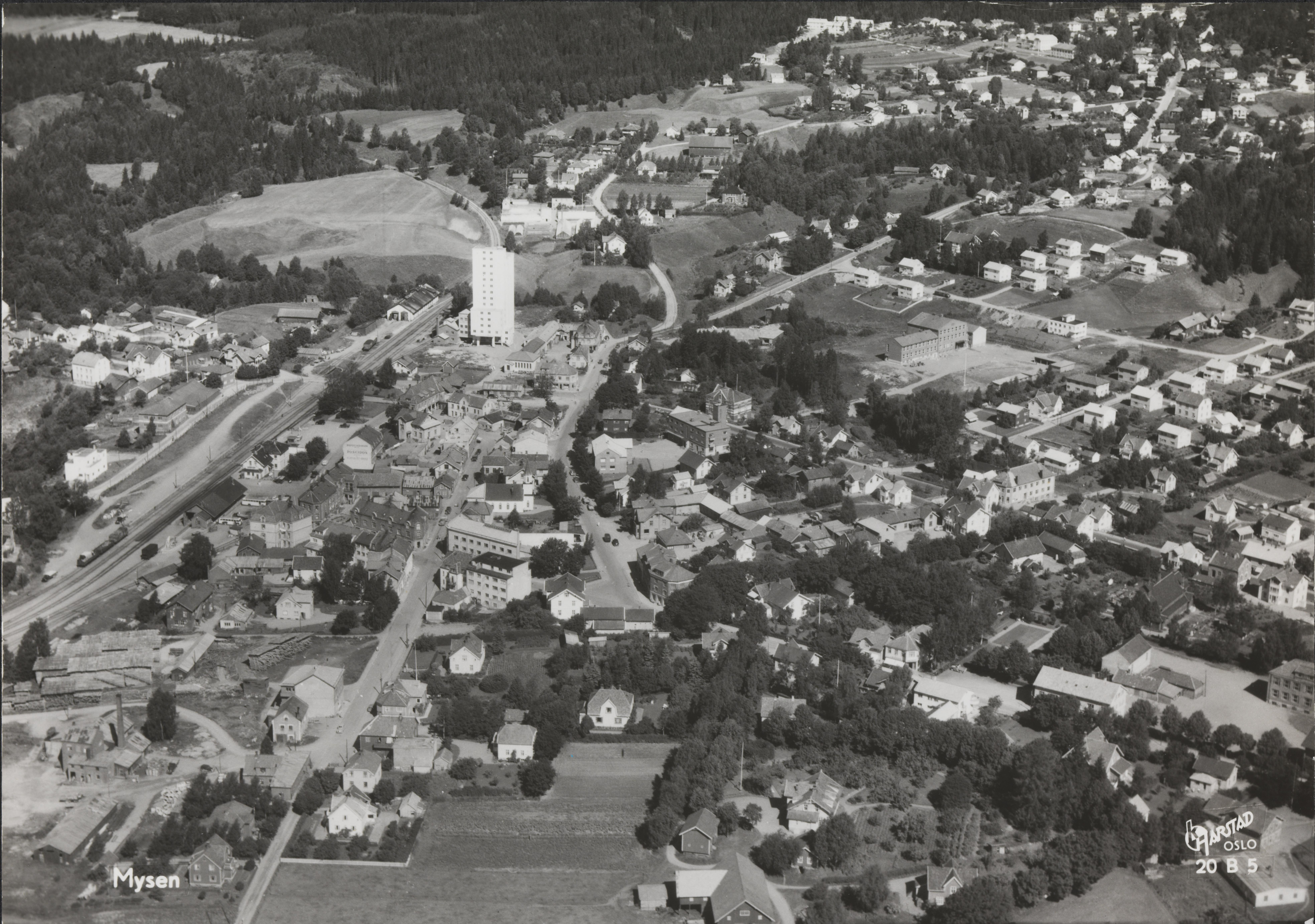
Aerial photo of Mysen sometime between 1953 and 1970. The station, tracks and grain elevator can be seen to the left.

During the 1960s there was a concern that Mysen and Eidsberg would see a shrinking population. However, instead an increasing number of people started commuting to jobs in and around Oslo. By 1970 a quarter of the workforce were commuting, almost all to the capital. This led to a major change in the traffic pattern on the Eastern Østfold Line. Mysen became the end of train services, with the extensions to Sarpsborg closed down in 1986. At the same time NSB made more intensive its commuter service.

It also demolished the original station and sold the property to allow Citadel-complex to be built. As the need for facilities for railway functions decreased, the NSB saw a decreasing need for station facilities. The move away from traditional station buildings became distinct in the 1980s. Mysen and Ski Stations were two which were demolished to make way for large complexes next to the station, in which NSB rented the space it needed.

The platform areas were renovated in 2014. Previously the two platforms were 165 and 91 meters (541 and 299 ft) long, both 49 centimeters (19 in) tall. This was changed to 250 meters (820 ft) long and 76 centimeters (30 in) tall. Two additional parking tracks were also built. The following year an overpass was completed. As one of the last commuter lines, the Eastern Østfold Line received centralized traffic control from 31 August 2015, no longer making it necessary to have a train dispatcher at the station for passing. It was the first Norwegian line to utilize European Rail Traffic Management System.

== Facilities ==
Mysen Station is situated on the Eastern Østfold Line, 39.47 kilometers (24.53 mi) from Ski Station and 64.77 kilometers (40.25 mi) from Oslo S, at an elevation of 106.7 meters (350 ft) above mean sea level. The station has two side platforms which are 250 meters (820 ft) long and 76 centimeters (30 in) tall. The main passing loop at the station is 500 meters (1,600 ft) long. Tickets are available for sale at a Narvesen kiosk and at a ticket machine. The station is there equipped with 50 parking spaces and a bicycle rack. There is transfer to bus and taxi. There is a level crossing just north of the platforms.

The overpass is built with steel trusses with glass sidings. There are elevators on each side which are heated. The rest of the overpass is not. The structure has the same design as at Råde Station. One of the purposes of the overpass is to make the station more visual, given the lack of a station building.

The now demolished original station building was designed by Balthazar Lange, who had the responsibility for all stations along the Eastern Østfold Line. The wooden building is a third-class station and has the same design as many other stations on the line, Kråkstad, Tomter, Slitu, Eidsberg, Gautestad and Ise. Mysen also featured an engine shed and a turntable.

== Service ==
Mysen is served with hourly L22 trains operated by Vy's Oslo Commuter Rail. Travel time is 65 minutes to Oslo & and 41 minutes to Ski. The trains continue onward along the Drammen Line terminating at Skøyen Station. The station had 251,000 daily boarding and disembarking passengers in 2012, second-highest on the line. There are buses to Rakkestad and Trøgstad.

== Bibliography ==
- Bjerke, Thor; Holom, Finn (2004). Banedata 2004 (in Norwegian). Hamar / Oslo: Norwegian Railway Museum / Norwegian Railway Club. ISBN 82-90286-28-7.
- Hartmann, Eivind; Mangset, Øistein; Reisegg, Øyvind (1997). Neste stasjon (in Norwegian). Gyldendal. ISBN 82-05-25294-7.
- Langård, Geir-Widar; Ruud, Leif-Harald (2005). Sydbaneracer og Skandiapil – Glimt fra Østfoldbanen gjennom 125 år (in Norwegian). Oslo: Norwegian Railway Club. ISBN 978-82-90286-29-8.
- Sandberg, Per-Øivind (1998). Eidsberg gjennom 150 år (in Norwegian). Mysen: Eidsberg Sparebank. ISBN 82-994680-0-0.
- Thorsen, Herman (1914). Eidsberg herred – bidrag til en bygds beskrivelse (in Norwegian). Kristiania: Norli.

Preceding station			Following station
Slitu; Østereng	Eastern Østfold Line		Eidsberg; Folkenborg
Preceding station	Local trains		Following station
Slitu	R22	Oslo S–Mysen	Eidsberg
